= Briarhills, Houston =

Briarhills
- Subdivision
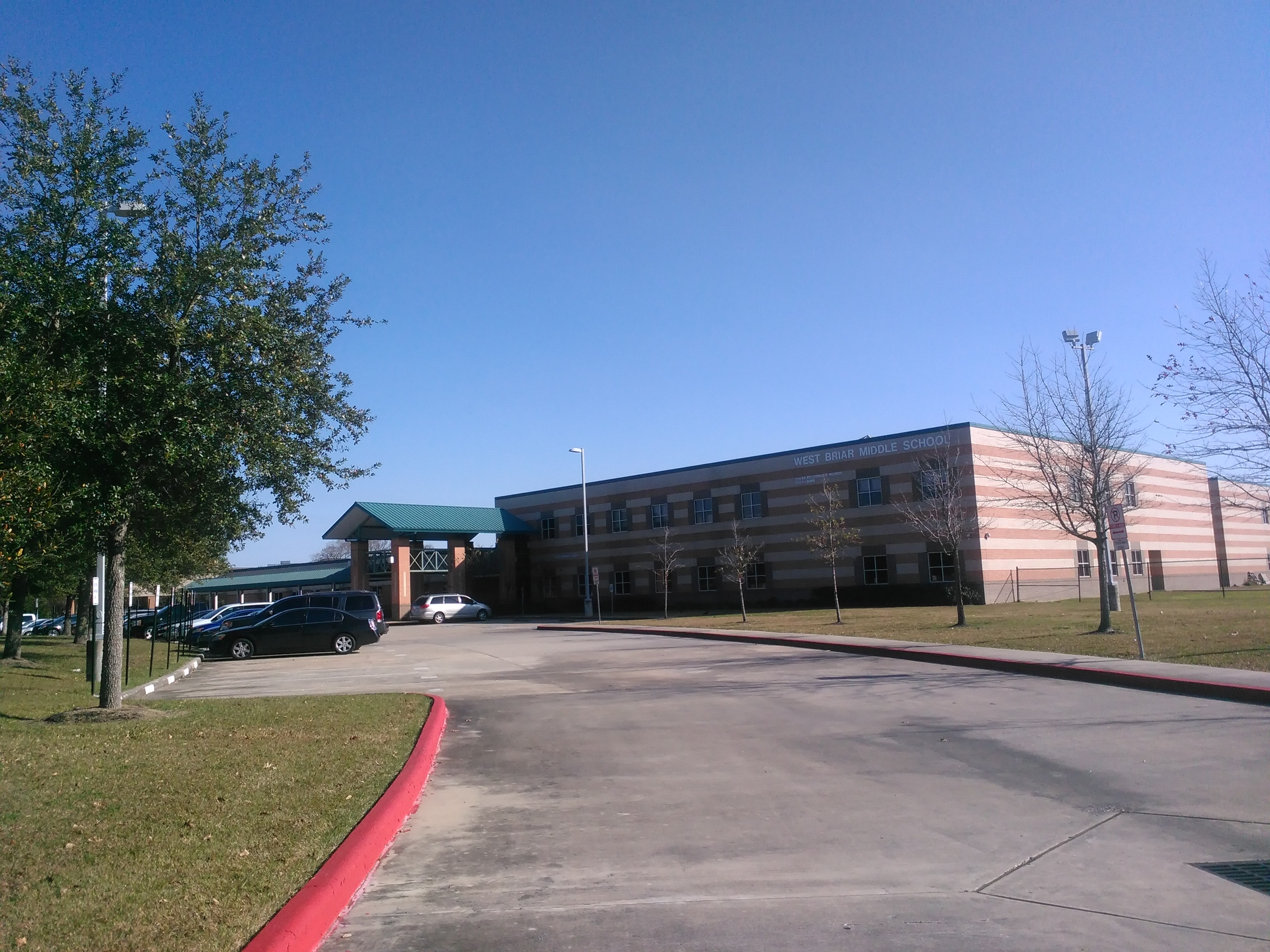
- West Briar Middle School in Parkway Villages

- Location within Texas
- Coordinates: 29.769°N 95.636°W
- Country: United States
- State: Texas
- City: Houston
- Website: Briarhills

Briarhills is a subdivision in western Houston, Texas. The Briarhills Property Owners Association (POA) and the Briarhills Home Owners Association (HOA) serve Briarhills, Meadowbriar, and Oaks of Parkway.

== History ==
In 2013 Faye Liu, a prospective homeowner quoted in a Houston Chronicle article, speculated that there were many employees at BP and Shell Oil Company who were buying houses quickly in Briarhills since they were able to pay with cash; these employees would be in the later stages of their careers.

== Cityscape ==
The community is in proximity to the intersection of Texas State Highway 6 and Briar Forest. Briarhills has 664 houses. Meadowbriar has about 125 houses. Oaks of Parkway has about 100 houses. Lakes of Parkway, Parkway Villages, retail developments, and restaurants are nearby.

As of 1996 the housing sizes are 1,800 square feet (170 m^{2}) to 3,400 square feet (320 m^{2}). In 2003, the lot sizes ranged from 5,500 square feet (510 m^{2}) to 16,000 square feet (1,500 m^{2}). The first generation houses, which were constructed in the late 1970s, include contemporary house and patio houses. In 2003 Nancy Scott, a real estate agent of John Daugherty, Realtors West Houston, stated that these houses had "more-modern kitchens and baths than most houses had" in the late 1970s and that "they were very innovative in their designs". 1980s-built houses included traditional patio and "soft contemporary houses". Houses built in the early 1990s included two-story traditional brick houses. The 1990s houses were priced from $140,000 ($287396.56 according to inflation) to $200,000 ($410566.52 according to inflation), or beginning at $70 ($143.7 according to inflation) per square foot; these houses were more inexpensive compared to those in the nearby gated "Parkway" communities. A real estate agent quoted in a 1996 Chronicle article, Rita Tucker Wright, stated that she believed that the diversity in housing styles makes Briarhills "the most unusual neighborhood in the west side of Houston."

As of 2003, according to Scott, the price range of the houses in Briarhills was $160,000 ($280028.94 with inflation) to $290,000 ($507552.46 with inflation).

== Government and infrastructure ==
The community is within the Eldridge/West Oaks Super Neighborhood (SN17).

Harris Health System (formerly Harris County Hospital District) designated Valbona Health Center (formerly People's Health Center) in Greater Sharpstown for ZIP code 77077. The nearest public hospital is Ben Taub General Hospital in the Texas Medical Center.

== Education ==
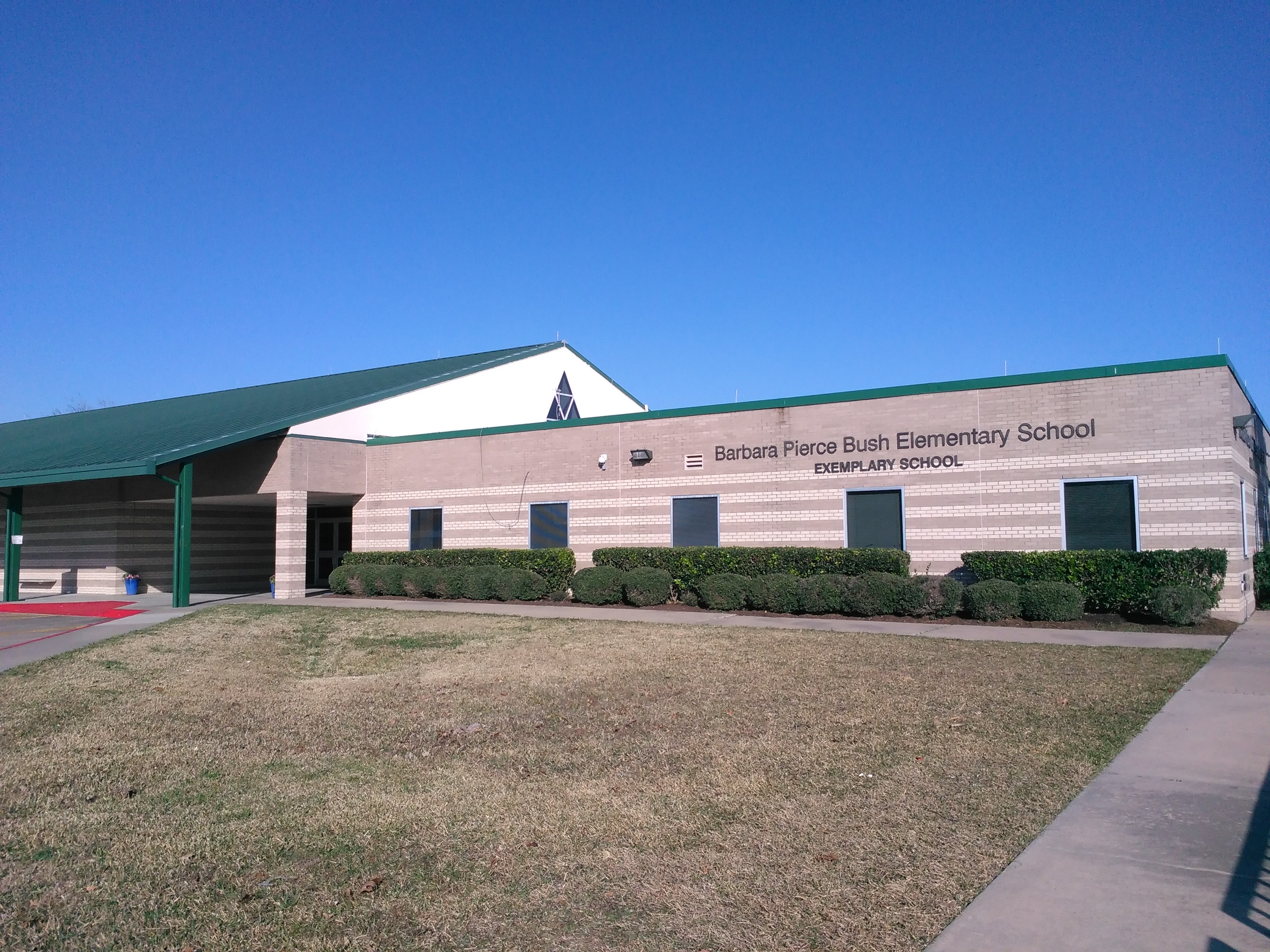
Barbara Bush Elementary School in Parkway Villages

Residents are in the Houston Independent School District. The zoned schools are Barbara Bush Elementary School, West Briar Middle School, and Westside High School.

Residents zoned to Ashford, Askew, Bush, and Daily may attend Shadowbriar Elementary School's magnet program. Residents zoned to Westside may transfer to Lamar High School.

In 1996 Bush was ranked as an "Exemplary" school, and that year Katherine Feser of the Houston Chronicle stated it was a "selling point" of Briarhills. In 2003 Feser wrote that Bush "was a key factor in buying in the neighborhood" and that it was "highly rated".

Bush opened in 1992. Westside opened in August 2000. West Briar, which was given a name combining those of Westheimer Road and Briar Forest, opened in 2002. Previously residents were zoned to Revere Middle School, and Wisdom High School (formerly Lee High School). Wisdom High School is over 10 miles (16 km) away from Briarhills. Grant Farris, a resident of Briarhills quoted in a 2003 Houston Chronicle article, stated that the openings of West Briar and Westside increased property values and increased cohesion in the community.

== Media ==
The Houston Chronicle is the citywide newspaper.

The Briarhills POA publishes the Briar Beat.

== Parks and recreation ==
Briarhills has basketball courts, a pool, tennis courts, and a 5-acre (2.0 ha) park. The park includes a clubhouse, and Meadowbriar and Oaks of Parkway residents share the facilities with Briarhills. The community is in proximity to Terry Hershey Park.

The community has a swim team called "The Dolphins".
