= Las Américas =

Las Américas may refer to:

== Population centers ==
- Playa de las Américas, a holiday resort in Tenerife, Spain
- Las Américas, a neighborhood in Ecatepec de Morelos

== Schools ==
- Las Américas Newcomer School, an alternative middle school in Houston, Texas

== Shopping centers ==
=== Mexico ===
- Plaza Las Américas (Cancún), Quintana Roo
- Plaza Las Américas (Celaya), Guanajuato state
- Plaza Las Américas (Chetumal), Quintana Roo
- Plaza Las Américas (Ecatepec), State of Mexico
- Plaza Las Américas (Lázaro Cárdenas), Michoacán
- Plaza Las Américas (Mérida), Yucatán state
- Plaza Las Américas (Metepec), State of Mexico
- Plaza Las Américas (Playa del Carmen), Quintana Roo
- Plaza Las Américas (Veracruz), Veracruz

=== Puerto Rico ===
- Plaza Las Américas (Puerto Rico), in Hato Rey, San Juan

=== United States ===
- Las Americas Premium Outlets, San Ysidro, San Diego, California, at the border with Tijuana, Mexico
- Plaza Las Americas (Georgia), Lilburn, Georgia

== Transportation ==
- Las Américas International Airport, an airport in Punta Caucedo, Santo Domingo
- Las Américas metro station, Valparaíso, Chile
- Las Américas (Mexibús, Line 1), a BRT station in Ecatepec, State of Mexico
- Las Américas (Mexibús, Line 2), a BRT station in Ecatepec, State of Mexico
- Las Américas (Mexico City Metrobús), a BRT station in Mexico City
