= Jane Long Academy =

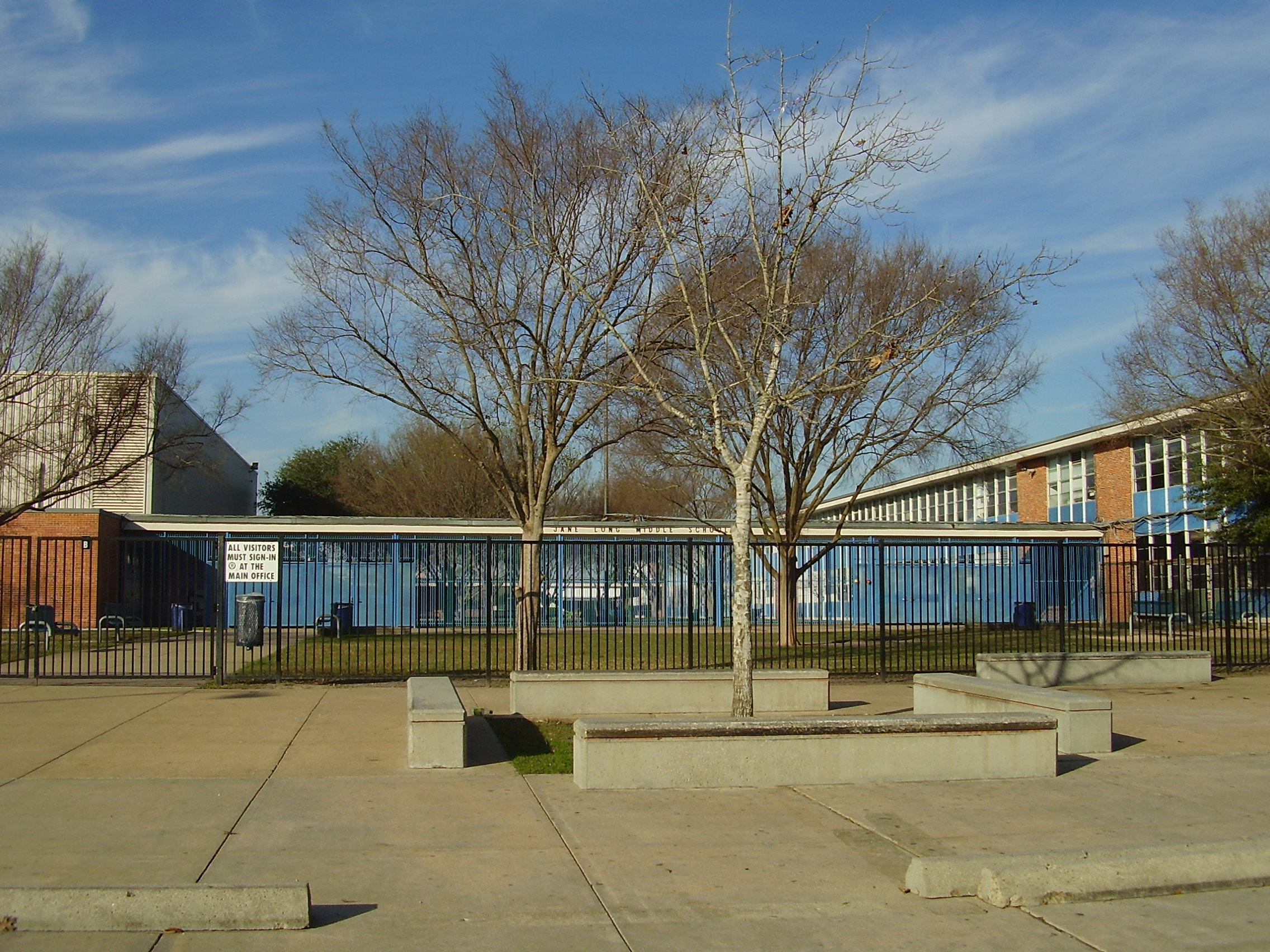

Location
- 6501 Bellaire Blvd. Houston, TX 77074-6428; Houston, Texas; United States; 29.705°N 95.498°W

Information
- Type: Public secondary school
- Website: long.houstonisd.org

Jane Long Academy, formerly Jane Long Middle School, is a public grade 6–12 middle and high school in Sharpstown, Houston, Texas. It is a part of the Houston Independent School District. Long, in Sharpstown Section 1, serves portions of Sharpstown, Gulfton, and Shenandoah for middle school. Jane Long serves Sharpstown original sections 1, 1A, and 2. The campus has a grade 6–8 neighborhood program together with a 9–12 Futures Academy, a non-zoned high school program that offers an associate degree track. Las Américas Newcomer School, a school for new immigrants, is on the Long campus.

== History ==
The school is named after Jane Wilkinson Long. It opened in 1957.

Around the early 1990s portions of the City of Bellaire west of the 610 Loop were zoned to Jane Long Middle, while portions inside the 610 Loop were zoned to Pershing Middle School. After its formation, the Bellaire Area School Improvement Committee (BASIC) installed a gifted and talented magnet at Jane Long. A 32% tax increase championed by HISD superintendent Frank Petruzielo funded the new magnet program which opened in August 1992. The new principal started work that month. Donald R. McAdams, a former HISD school board member and author of Fighting to Save Our Urban Schools... and Winning!: Lessons from Houston, wrote that the magnet program was "successful" and that the new principal was "extraordinary." McAdams stated that "In a few years Long showed dramatic improvement in appearance, discipline, and test scores."

McAdams described it as a school that was "unacceptable" to non-Hispanic White Bellaire residents since it was less than 10% white. McAdams added that even with the new program, to many parents in Bellaire, Long was "never going to be acceptable" due to the overwhelming Hispanic presence. McAdams recalled that one parent told him "I don't care how good the gifted program becomes. I don't care what you do to Jane Long, I will never place my daughter there with all those Hispanic boys."

In October 2006, Michael Marquez, president of the Hispanic Housing and Education Corporation, which operated the Las Américas apartments, announced to HISD in a letter that the organization would terminate the lease agreement between HISD and the apartment complex because of issues related to maintenance and management, affecting the HISD schools housed there. The district decided to vacate the property instead of appealing the decision. In summer 2007, the former Las Américas Education Center closed. The middle schools that were in the complex, Las Américas Middle School and Kaleidoscope Middle School, moved to the Long Middle School campus.

In 2010 Long had 700 students. The building capacity was for 1,790 students. Diana de la Rosa, the principal, stated that area charter schools attracted students who would otherwise attend Long. In the 2010–2011 school year the school had 244 sixth graders when it had been expecting 200. De La Rosa credited this to the introduction of an after-school program jointly operated by Citizen Schools, the addition of monthly parenting workshops, and the extension of the school hours of Long Middle.

In 2011 Long Middle School experimented with increasing the school day for sixth grade students by three hours as part of its partnership with Citizen Schools. For that reason, in 2011 Jane Long was selected as one of four schools to participate in the Microsoft Partners in Learning program.

In 2014 the district scheduled the elimination of the Long Vanguard program for the 2015–2016 school year.

In 2016, under the leadership of Dr. Marcela Baez, Jane Long Academy housed 1100 students, roughly 850 in middle school and an additional 250 in its high school. The Futures program had its first set of graduating students, most of whom not only received their high school diploma, but also a two-year associate degree in pharmacy technology through Houston Community College. The 57 graduates of the inaugural class earned more than $2 million in scholarships, many full-ride, to finish at four-year universities. The middle school had an allied health magnet program, wherein students studied topics relevant to the more than 100,000 jobs in the Houston Medical Center, and made preparations to attend the magnet high school. Four Jane Long Academy students were chosen to represent their generation of hope and achievement by addressing the crowd of educators and community leaders at the State of the Schools event, March 2016.

== Programs ==
In 2010 the school had a Peer Mediator Program to teach students how to resolve conflicts peacefully. More recently, the school added the CHAMPs method for successfully managing classroom expectations and behaviors. JLA offered an accelerated program of study through Pre-AP/GT classes in middle school, and college classes in high school.

Extracurricular programs included a variety of sports, including football, volleyball, basketball, soccer, and track and field. Jane Long Academy has also had competition teams in robotics, Science Olympiad, and name-that-book and math competitions. In 2016, a partnership was formed between theater arts students at Jane Long and the Theater Under the Stars. Students were hosted by TUTS and viewed In the Heights, a Lin-Manuel Miranda play about Latino life in New York. Then actors from the play travelled to Jane Long Academy to work with the students, develop stories of their own, and produce a film representative of their cultures and lives.

In partnership with the Houston Rockets, NASA, and Houston Community College, Jane Long Academy students visited Space Center Houston and learned about space exploration and the physics of flight. They were given model rockets to build, which the students later launched at the northeast campus of HCC.

== School uniforms ==
The school requires its middle school students to wear school uniforms.

The school first adopted school uniforms, called "standard mode of dress", in 1994. Robert Farquharson, the principal, stated that parents requested uniforms since many came from countries were students normally wore school uniforms. Farquharson stated that in order to ensure all students bought the specific uniform style, regardless of finances, the school did not require a specific uniform provider. According to Farquharson the faculty members were in favor of uniforms, the parents were "ecstatic", but the students had "more mixed" viewpoints on the uniforms. As the principal commented, ".... I would expect that from adolescents." The principal added "We are trying to find ways to make kids want to do things that will keep them in a mode of fashion that is not going to get them into trouble. If we are going to have a gang, we are going to have the Jane Long gang." At the time the dress required white shirts with sleeves, with plain white T-shirts being acceptable, and blue trousers or shirts, with blue jeans being acceptable.

As of 2013–2014 students were required to wear polo shirts of different shades of blue depending on grade level, and blue denim pants.

== Feeder patterns ==
Elementary schools feeding into Long's zoned middle school program include:

- Benavidez
- Braeburn
- Cunningham
- Rodriguez
- Sutton

Elementary schools partially feeding into the Long zoned middle school include:

- Herod

Residents zoned to Jane Long may attend Pin Oak Middle School in Bellaire as an option.

Portions of the Long middle school attendance boundary coincide with that of Bellaire High School, Margaret Long Wisdom High School (formerly Robert E. Lee High School), and Sharpstown High School. Students within the Margaret Long Wisdom zone have the option to attend Lamar or Westside high schools.
