= Walnut Bend, Houston =

Neighborhood of Houston, Texas

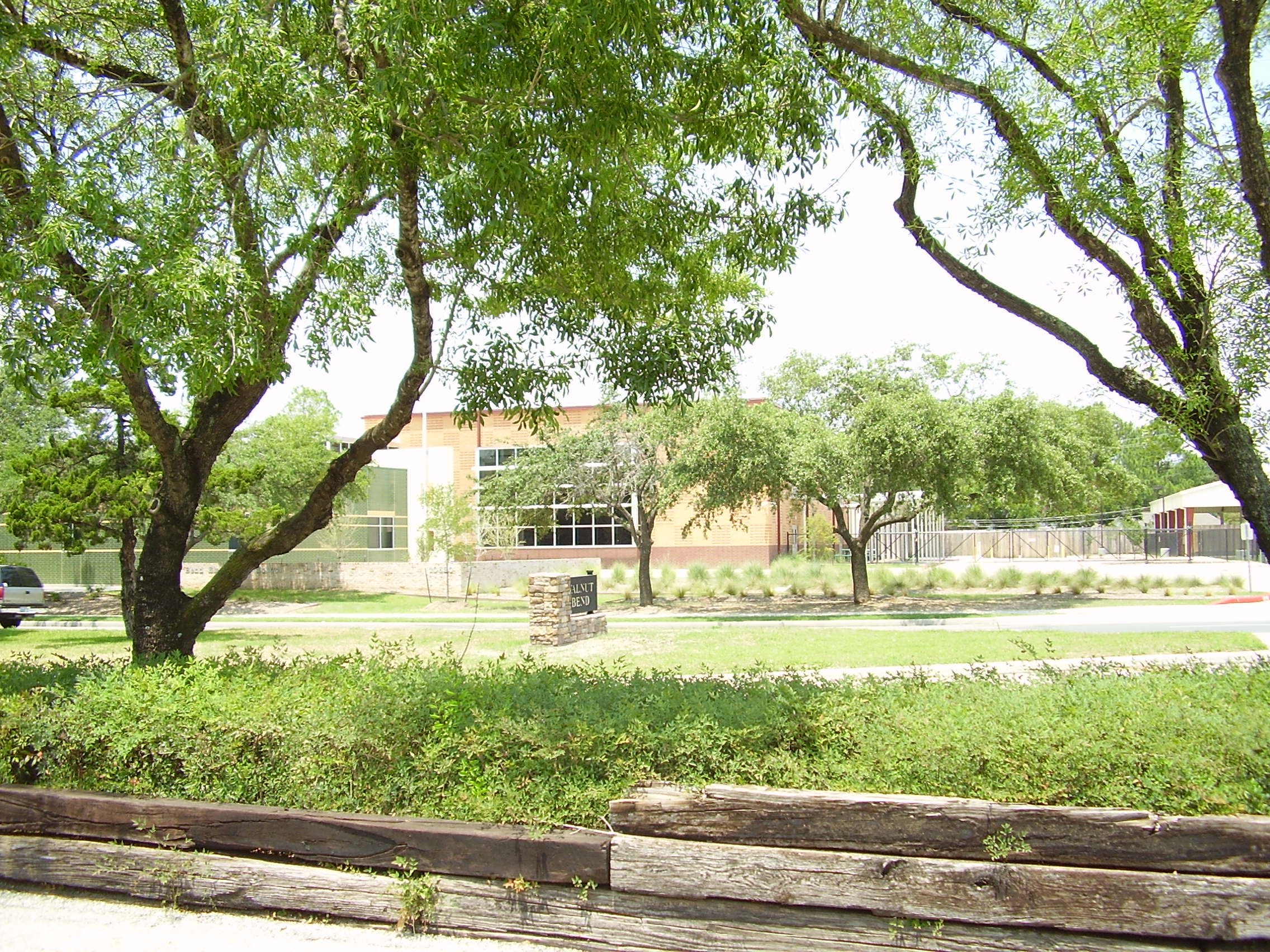
A sign indicating Walnut Bend is in the median

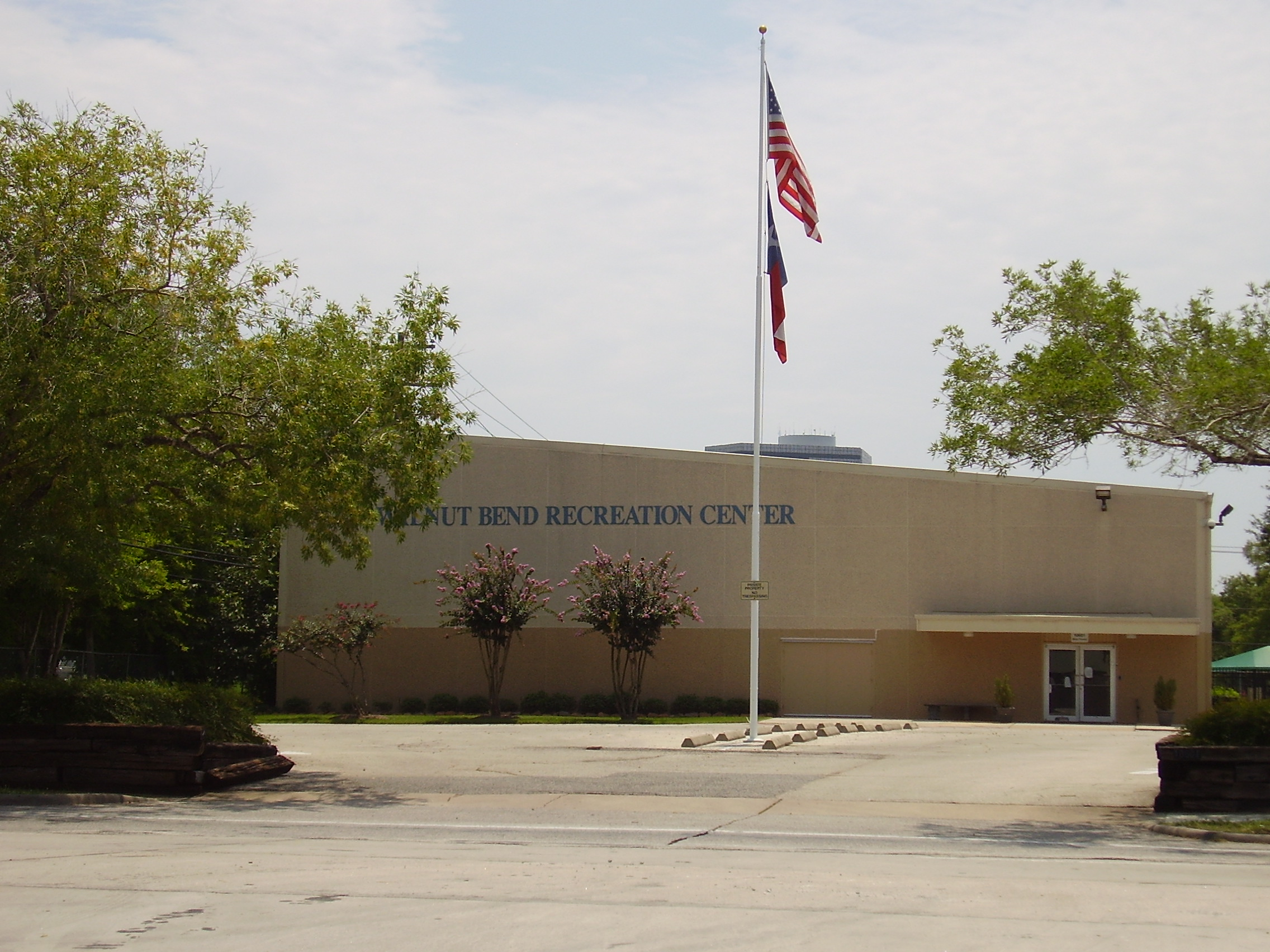
Walnut Bend Recreation Center, a facility for residents of Walnut Bend

Walnut Bend is a subdivision in Houston, Texas, United States.

Walnut Bend is located north of Westheimer Road (Farm to Market Road 1093) and outside Beltway 8. It is near Westchase.

Walnut Bend is an established neighborhood of 983 homes and townhomes located in Houston, Texas. This tranquil neighborhood was established in the early 1950s and was featured in the 1960 Parade of Homes showcasing vintage homes with tree-lined streets and beautiful landscaping. The typical residence ranges from 2,000 square feet (190 m^{2}) to 2,800 square feet (260 m^{2}).

== Government and infrastructure ==
Walnut Bend is a part of Houston City Council District G.

== Westchase Long-Range Plan ==
As a neighborhood of Westchase, the surrounding area benefits through the long-range plan developed for the area. Westchase District has a “380 Agreement” with the City of Houston which will bring tens of millions of dollars to the District to fund elements of the plan. A collaborative two-year process that involved the Westchase Board of Directors and staff, public agency representatives, numerous stakeholders, architects, engineers, and urban planners conceived Westchase District's Long-Range Plan. The plan provides a framework to help guide future development. Changing the public environment that developers can leverage, will attract investment and increase economic value in the Westchase District. We have already implemented the first part of the plan by developing a three-part trail system that connects Westchase District to the Brays Bayou trail system and Art Storey Park south of Bellaire.

== Education ==
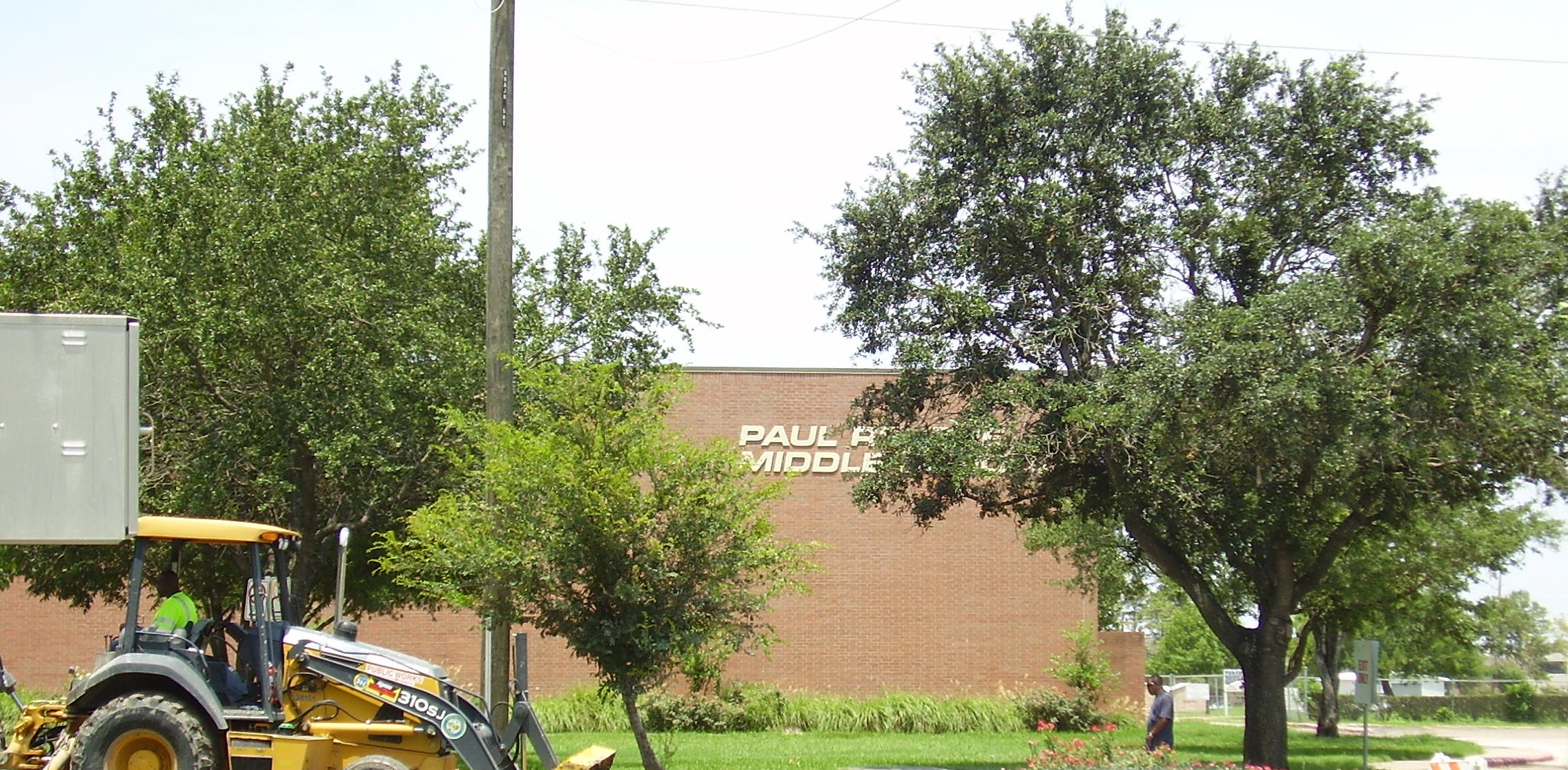
Revere Middle School

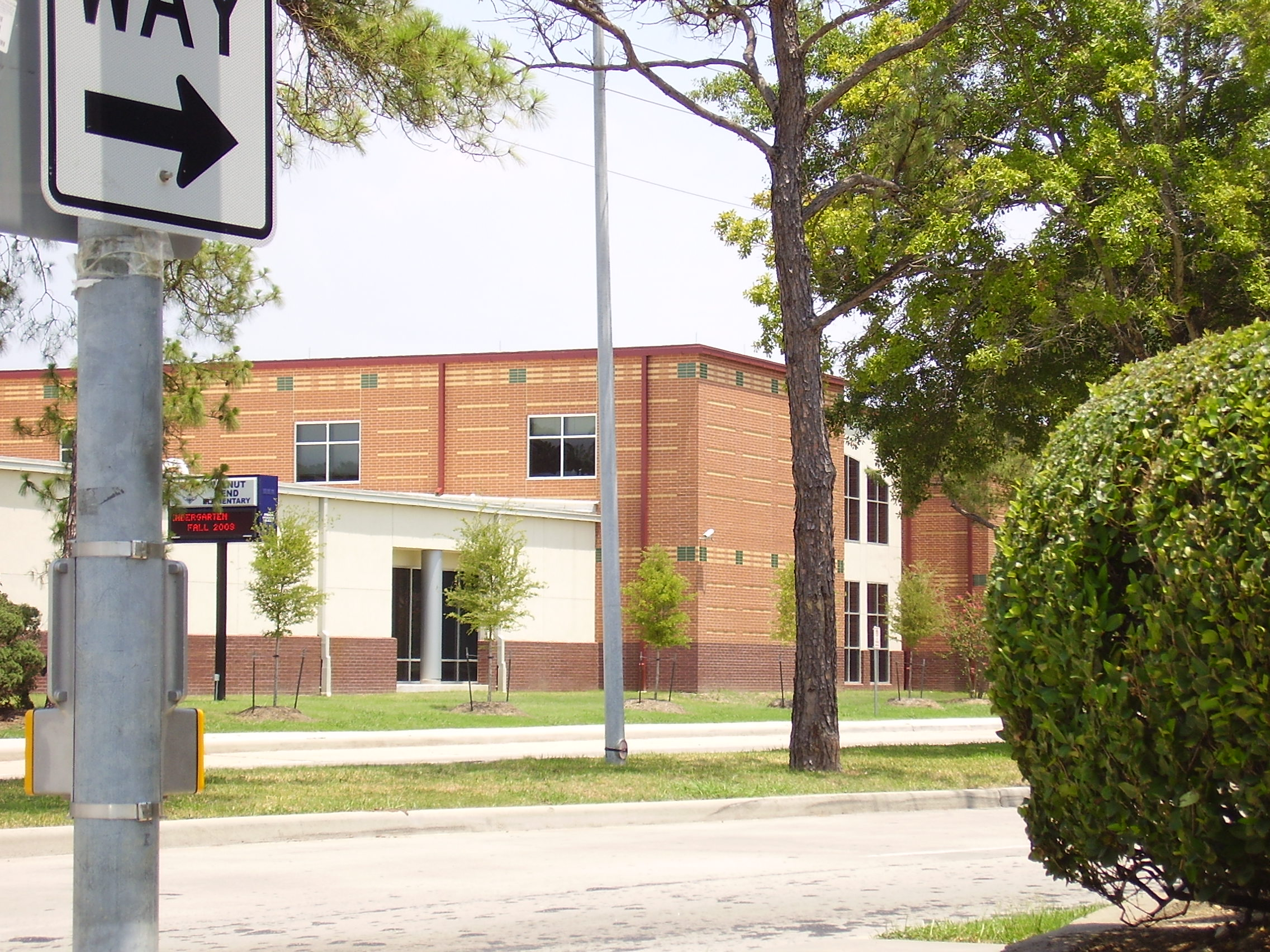
Walnut Bend Elementary School

Walnut Bend residents are zoned to Houston Independent School District schools. The community is within Trustee District VI, represented by Greg Meyers as of 2008.

Schools serving Walnut Bend include Walnut Bend Elementary School, located in Walnut Bend section six; Revere Middle School; (with West Briar Middle School as an option), and Westside High School. Residents zoned to Westside may transfer to Lamar High School.

Walnut Bend Elementary first opened in 1964 with a capacity of 350 students. It received a new campus building in 2007. Its current two-story $14 million campus was designed by VLK Architects and constructed by Heery International.

Revere opened in 1980 and Westside opened in 2000. Prior to the opening of Westside, Walnut Bend was zoned to Lee High School (now Wisdom High School). Prior to the opening of Revere Middle School, Walnut Bend was zoned to TH Rogers Junior High.

Residents zoned to Ashford, Askew, Bush, Daily, Emerson, and Walnut Bend may attend Shadowbriar Elementary School's magnet program.
