= Bellaire High School (Texas) =

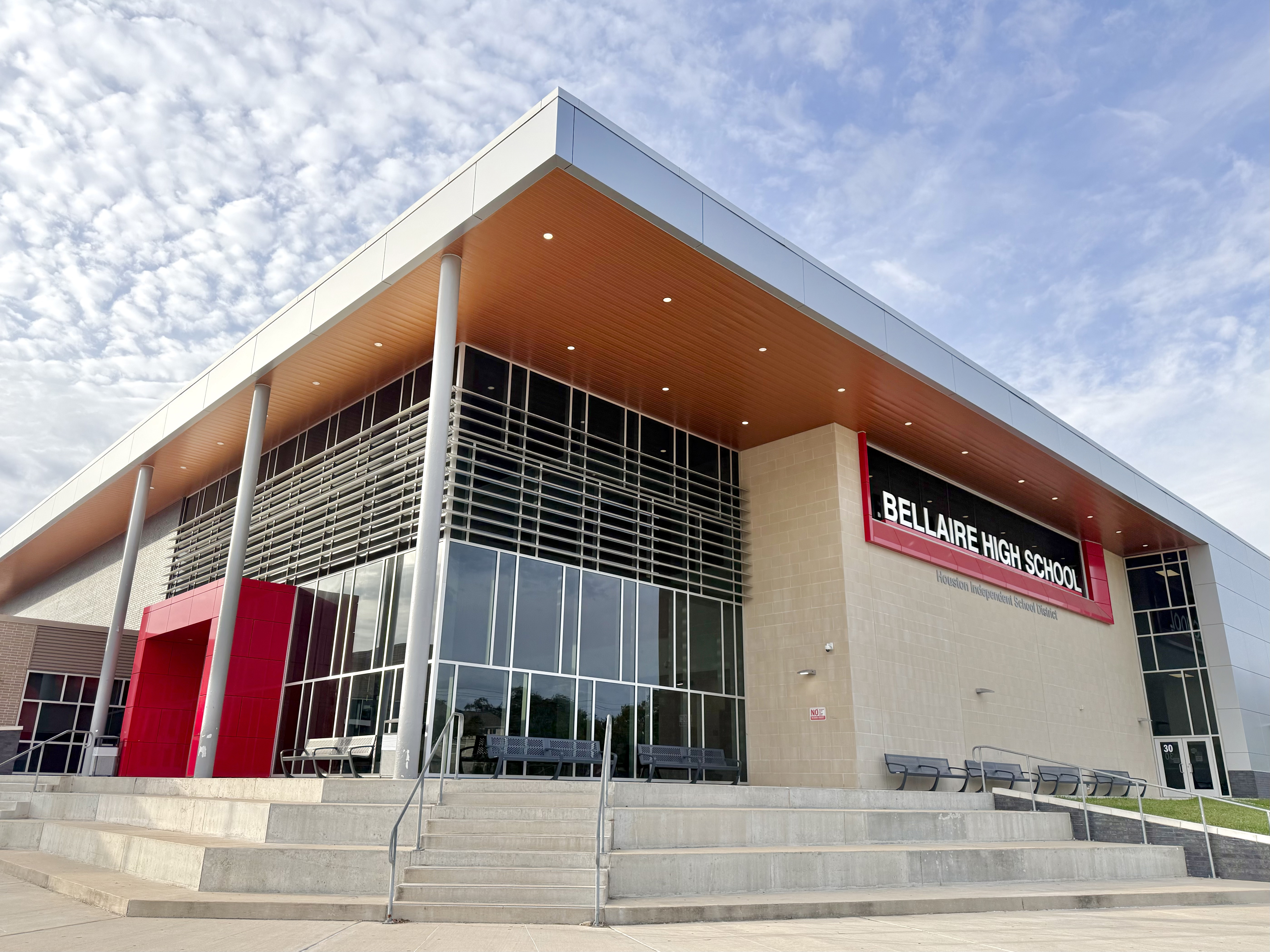
- Current campus

Location
- 5100 Maple Street; Bellaire, Texas 77401; United States; 29°41′28″N 95°28′7″W

Information
- Type: Public Secondary
- Established: 1955
- School district: Houston Independent School District
- Principal: Michael Niggli
- Staff: 179.29 (FTE)
- Grades: 9–12
- Enrollment: 3,161 (2023–2024)
- Student to teacher ratio: 17.63
- Campus type: Urban
- Colors: Cardinal Red & White
- Mascot: Cardinal
- Newspaper: Three Penny Press
- Yearbook: Carillon
- Feeder schools: Jane Long Academy; Pershing Middle School; Pin Oak Middle School; Others listed below
- Website: School website

Bellaire High School is a comprehensive, foreign language magnet, public secondary school in Bellaire, Texas. Part of the Houston Independent School District, it serves the incorporated city of Bellaire, the Houston community of Meyerland, other adjacent Houston neighborhoods, as well as magnet students from all over the city It has a racially and socioeconomically diverse student body.

== History ==
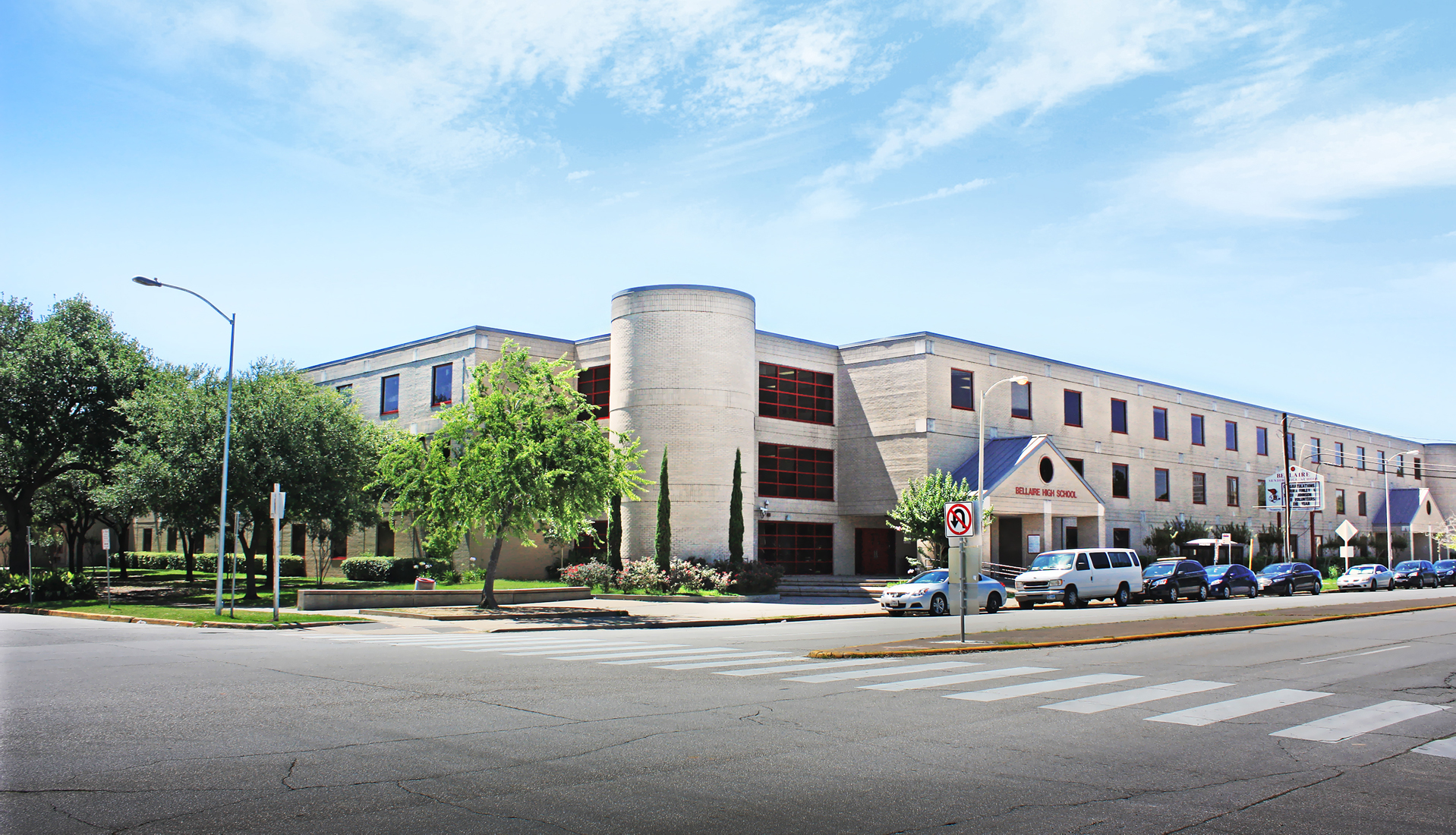
Former campus (pre-2021)

The school opened in 1955. It was originally an all-White high school. Because of the large number of Jewish students, the school had the nickname "Hebrew High".

Bellaire introduced International Baccalaureate programs in 1980.

In the mid-to-late 1980s, families began moving into Bellaire and Meyerland. These families tore down many older houses and built new ones. This gave Bellaire High School a population of wealthier students. At the same time apartments formerly housing White singles began to house low-income immigrants. Bellaire added Advanced Placement and International Baccalaureate programs to encourage White parents to send their children to Bellaire. Parents strove to get their children into the classes. Mimi Swartz of the Texas Monthly said "But these outstanding academic programs created, over time, a school within a school, in which the smartest kids with the most advantages took the IB and AP tracks, while everyone else was relegated to classes that, for various reasons—discipline problems, less talented teachers, lower standards—just weren't as good."

In January 1987, Bellaire was offering the Arabic language for the second year. In 1987 the school also offered Chinese, French, German, Hebrew, Latin, Russian, and Spanish.

In September 1991, Bellaire was one of 32 HISD schools that had capped enrollments; in other words the school was filled to capacity and excess students had to attend other schools.

Bellaire High School was remodeled in the 1992–1993 period.

By the 2000s Bellaire placed on the lists of the top performing high schools in the United States. Athletic and academic programs won national and international awards. At the same time, disciplinary infractions increased. From the 1999–2000 school year to the 2003–2004 school year, the total number of disciplinary actions increased from 441 to 1,082 and the number of in-school suspensions increased from 336 to 855. In February 2006, a stabbing involving two male freshmen occurred in a school stairwell. The victim survived the stabbing while the perpetrator was arrested and prosecuted.

During the same year Todd Spivak of the Houston Press reported about the school in the magazine's feature "These Kids Go to the Best Public High School in Houston". Spivak said that Bellaire High School had "strong, consistent leadership and a diverse student population" but that it received a lower rating due to a "surprisingly high dropout rate." Spivak said that the survey indicated that Bellaire graduated two thirds of its students. Dr. Robert Sanborn, president and CEO of the Children at Risk organization, said that at Bellaire an achievement gap existed between the top-performing students and the lowest-performing students.

In 2007, 13 percent of high school-aged children zoned to Bellaire chose to attend a different Houston ISD school.

In 2010, Magnet Schools of America, a nonprofit, released a report recommending that Bellaire's magnet program be abolished, due to overcrowding of the school.

In 2011, the Brays Oaks district expanded. A small portion of Bellaire High School attendance zone became a part of the district.

In 2014, HISD superintendent Terry Grier stated that Bellaire should reduce its enrollment to around 3,000 students.

After Chevron Corporation announced it was selling its office complex in Bellaire in 2016, HISD officials considered the idea of buying the property so a new Bellaire High School could be built there. Instead HISD decided to rebuild Bellaire High on its current site. In 2017 HISD announced plans to demolish the Gordon Elementary School/former Mandarin Immersion Magnet School campus in Bellaire so Bellaire High School's baseball practice field could be relocated there, allowing HISD to easily rebuild the high school main campus.

On January 14, 2020, there was a fatal shooting where a senior died. The suspect received a manslaughter charge. The district attorney of Harris County stated that the evidence so far supports that the suspect had no intention of committing murder. HISD interim superintendent Grenita Latham stated that the district was exploring plans for metal detectors.

Around April 2021, the school announced there would be 9 students tied in the place for valedictorian for the spring graduating class of 2021.

Plans to demolish the main building began in summer of 2021. On May 15, 2021, visitors went through a final walk-through event before demolition.

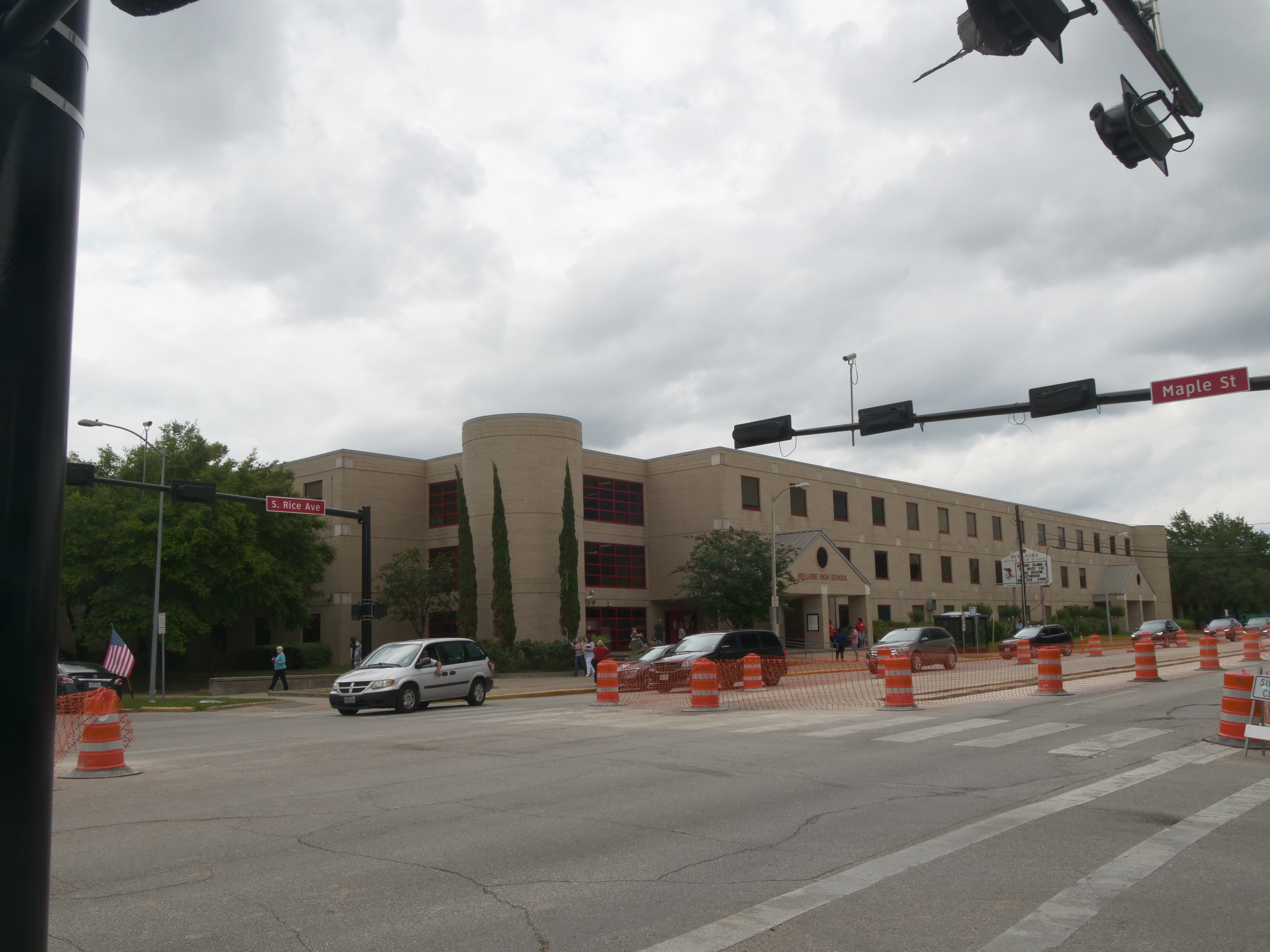
Bellaire High School building (since 1955) during final walk-through event (taken on May 15, 2021) on the intersection of S. Rice and Maple St.

== Academic programs ==
Mimi Swartz of Texas Monthly said in 2006 that Bellaire was "arguably the city's best public school" and "prestigious." Lynwood Abram of the Houston Chronicle said in 2006 that Bellaire is "academically acclaimed". Jason Spencer of the Houston Chronicle said that the current principal and formal principal said that Bellaire has a "reputation for academic excellence" because, in the words of former principal Hilbert Bludau, "Parents felt ownership of that school." Cathy Mincberg, an HISD trustee, said in 1993 that "There isn't a private school in Houston that can beat Bellaire High School."

As of 2008, each year the school has about thirty National Merit Scholars. In 2005 it had 40 National Merit Scholars. Of 3,400 students, 323 were AP Scholars in 2005. Colleges and universities which have accepted Bellaire High School graduates include all 2016–2017 U.S. News & World Report Top 10 Ranked National Universities, ranked: Princeton University, Harvard University, University of Chicago, Yale University, Columbia University, Stanford University, Massachusetts Institute of Technology, Duke University, University of Pennsylvania, and Johns Hopkins University as well as many more. As of 2008 Bellaire's yearbook, the Carillion, frequently wins high school yearbook awards. The school typically has the highest SAT scores in the district. Bludau said that some parents tried to use political connections to ensure that their children entered Bellaire.

Out of over 20,000 high schools in the United States, the school ranked number 80th, 86th, 112th, 109th, and 100th in Newsweek's 2002, 2003, 2005, 2006, 2008 lists of the top high schools in the United States, respectively. The Challenge Index ranks schools by the number of AP and IB tests taken by students at a school in 2002 divided by the number of graduating seniors. 323 students at Bellaire High School in the 2004–2005 academic year earned the designation of AP Scholar by the College Board in recognition of their achievement on the college-level Advanced Placement Program Exams.

Bellaire led the Houston Independent School District in number of National Merit Program Finalists.

Bellaire High School has Advanced Placement and IB Diploma Programme (International Baccalaureate) programs. Bellaire High School has been an IB World School since September 1979. In the last examination session, students completed the following exams (in both standard and higher levels): Biology, Chemistry, Computer Science, Economics, English A1, French B, Geography, German B, Hindi B, Italian B, Latin, Mandarin B, Mathematics, Music, Physics, Psychology, Russian B, Spanish Ab., Spanish B, Theory of Knowledge, and Visual Arts. In the 2005–2006 school year, there were 24 students who successfully received their IB Diplomas.

== Athletics ==
Bellaire's main athletic rival is Lamar High School.

== School culture ==
According to an October 2004 Whatkidscando.org report called "Students as Allies in Improving Their High Schools", in many of Houston ISD's top high schools, including Bellaire, over one half of students are enrolled in high-level courses. According to the surveys given by the organization, many of the students at the schools cited academic pressure issues. 82 percent stated that they do not miss school during illnesses, stating that the makeup work would be too difficult.

Many parents volunteer at Bellaire. The parent-teacher organization has multiple committees. In 2005 the parents opened a "college information center".

In 2006 Mimi Swartz said in Texas Monthly that the school was socially stratified. She said because drugs were "plentiful" in Meyerland, one community zoned to Bellaire, the drug culture among students "would surprise no one. Drugs were everywhere, as socially segmented and niche marketed—bars (Xanax) for the rich kids, weed for the gang bangers, meth for the goths—as the designer sneakers and expensive handbags the students coveted."

In the spring BHS hosts an open house for incoming students. Previously the open house emphasized the school's difficulty. In 2013 it was changed to a "jamboree" format that emphasized the school's social life.

== Location and campus ==
Bellaire High School is located within the city of Bellaire, an enclave of the southwest area of Houston. Bellaire City Hall, the Bellaire Police Station, Bellaire Fire Station, and the Bellaire water tower are nearby. Several parks and playgrounds are in proximity. According to Ericka Mellon of the Chronicle, the lot occupied by Bellaire High is one of the smallest used by an HISD school facility, and she stated that the district had a complication with rebuilding plans as it had the highest enrollment in the district. Bellaire area homeowners complained about potential complications from rebuilding plans.

In 2006 Mimi Swartz of Texas Monthly said that Bellaire "still looks like the only high school in a small town. The architecture is blocky and unexceptional."

== Demographics ==
In 2006 Mimi Swartz of Texas Monthly said "in the halls you see whites, blacks, Hispanics, and East and Central Asians." Bellaire also has disparate income gaps between students from wealthier families and students from poorer families.

Many students in other parts of Houston ISD transfer to Bellaire to escape home schools that do not have good academic performance, causing the attendance figures of those schools to suffer.

As of 12 June 2020 most students at the school are within the Bellaire attendance zone.

In the 2022–2023 school year, the racial demographics of the student body consisted of:

- 42.4% Hispanic American
- 19.2% African American
- 21.4% White American
- 13.9% Asian American
- 0.2% Native American
- 2.7% Multiracial

== Neighborhoods served ==
All pupils in the city of Bellaire are zoned to Bellaire High School. Several parts of Houston that are around the city of Bellaire, including Meyerland, Braesmont, parts of Braeswood Place that are west of Stella Link and parts that are south of South Braeswood (including the subdivisions of Ayrshire and Braes Terrace), Linkwood, Knollwood Village, Woodshire, Woodside, Westridge, Maplewood, Maplewood North, about half of Westwood, a small portion of Westbury, Flack Estates, and a small portion of Willow Meadows, are zoned to Bellaire High School. In addition a section of the city of Houston-defined Gulfton Super Neighborhood is zoned to Bellaire High. A small portion of Southside Place is zoned to Bellaire High School.

== Transportation ==
Houston ISD provides school buses for students who live more than two miles away from the school or who have major obstacles between their houses and the school. Students are eligible if they are zoned to Bellaire or are in the Bellaire magnet program. A METRO bus stop (Maple at South Rice) is located at the school's entrance. Bus line 33 (Post Oak Crosstown) stops at Maple at South Rice.

== Feeder patterns ==
Elementary schools that feed into Bellaire include:

- Lovett

Partial:

- Braeburn
- Condit
- Cunningham
- Herod
- Horn
- Kolter
- Longfellow
- Red
- Roberts
- Shearn
- Twain
- Whidby

Middle schools that feed into Bellaire include parts of Cullen, Fondren, Meyerland Performing and Visual Arts (formerly Johnston), Long, and Pershing, All pupils zoned to Meyerland Middle, Long, and Pershing Middle Schools may apply to Pin Oak Middle School's regular program; therefore Pin Oak also feeds into Bellaire High School.

Many pupils who are in the Vanguard program and attend middle school at Lanier or T.H. Rogers choose to go to Bellaire High School. Some students who are enrolled in private schools in the 8th grade choose to go to Bellaire for high school.

== Notable alumni ==
- Jon Bass (actor, known for roles in She-Hulk: Attorney at Law and Super Pumped)
- Ed Blum (activist)
- John Carter (member of United States Congress)
- Bubba Crosby (athlete, Major League Baseball outfielder)
- José Cruz Jr. (athlete, Gold Glove outfielder for Houston Astros)
- Leemore Dafny (American Economist, Bruce V. Rauner Professor of Business Administration at Harvard Business School)
- Jeff DaVanon (athlete, Major League Baseball outfielder)
- Tyler Duffey (baseball player for Minnesota Twins)
- Gary Elkins (Class of 1974), member of the Texas House of Representatives from District 135 in Houston since 1995
- Justin Furstenfeld (singer, songwriter)
- Larry Hardy, (athlete, Major League Baseball pitcher)
- Mya Hollingshed (basketball player)
- Janet Hsieh (Class of 1997) (television host and model based in Taiwan)
- Annalee Jefferies (stage actress)
- Chuck Knoblauch (Class of 1986) (MLB All-Star second baseman)
- Harvey Kronberg (Texas political journalist)
- Richard Linklater (director of Boyhood, Dazed and Confused, Before Sunrise)
- Jai Lucas (class of 2007) (head basketball coach at the University of Miami)
- John Lucas III (class of 2001) (athlete, National Basketball Association)
- Sheldon Mac (class of 2011) (former NBA player)
- Jackie Moore (MLB player, coach, and manager)
- Emeka Okafor (class of 2001) (athlete, Washington Wizards center; 2005 NBA Rookie of the Year for Charlotte Bobcats)
- Cindy Pickett (actress, best known for film Ferris Bueller's Day Off and television series St. Elsewhere)
- Dennis Quaid (actor, best known for his roles in feature films like Inner Space, The Right Stuff, and The Big Easy)
- Randy Quaid (actor, best known for his roles in films like Kingpin, The Last Detail and Independence Day)
- Anessa Ramsey (actress, known for roles in The Signal and Footloose)
- Thomas Schlamme (Emmy-winning television director and producer of The West Wing)
- Mike Sowell (sports historian and journalist)
- Brent Spiner (actor, played Data from Star Trek: The Next Generation)
- Gary Tinterow (Class of 1972), art historian and director of the Museum of Fine Arts, Houston
- Ngozi Ukazu (American cartoonist, author/illustrator of the webcomic Check, Please!)
- Sheng Wang (Comedian)
- Marianne Williamson (author, spiritual teacher)
- Trey Wilson (actor, best known for films like Bull Durham and Raising Arizona)
- Kelly Wunsch (athlete, MLB pitcher for Chicago White Sox)
- Cindy Yen (Taiwanese pop singer)
- Chris Young (athlete, outfielder for Boston Red Sox)
- John Zerwas (physician, member of Texas House of Representatives)
