= Briargrove Park, Houston =

Subdivision in western Houston, Texas, United States

Coordinates: 29.75°N 95.55°W

Briargrove Park (BGP) is a subdivision in western Houston, Texas, United States. It has about 1,480 houses. It is bounded by Beltway 8, the Buffalo Bayou, Gessner Road, and Westheimer Road.

Briargrove Park is located north of Westheimer Road and inside of Beltway 8.

It is partially surrounded by Westchase.

== History ==
It was established in 1962. Mayor of Houston Jim McConn and J. R. "Jim" McConnell participated in the groundbreaking; they were both real estate developers. Houses initially sold in the range $30,000 (according to inflation$, 311848.18)-$50,000 (according to inflation$, 519746.97). From 2005 to 2006 the prices of houses in Briargrove Park increased by 10%.

In May 2008, the Rivercrest subdivision pressured the City of Houston to block some streets leading into the neighborhood to end high traffic into the neighborhood. Afterwards the traffic moved into Briargrove Park. Briargrove Park residents began political rallying to remove the blocks of Rivercrest. Kristi Thibaut, a Texas state representative and Briargrove Park resident, sponsored a bill that would require cities to hold hearings before implementing a similar traffic alteration.

== Government and infrastructure ==
As of 2011 Briargrove Park residents are a part of Houston City Council District G.

== Education ==
Briargrove Park residents are zoned to Houston Independent School District schools. The community is within Trustee District VI, represented by Greg Meyers as of 2008.

The community is zoned to Walnut Bend Elementary School, Revere Middle School (with West Briar Middle School as an option), and Westside High School.

Residents zoned to Westside may transfer to Lamar High School.

Walnut Bend opened in 1964, Revere opened in 1980, and Westside opened in 2000. Walnut Bend received a new campus building in 2007. Prior to the opening of Westside, Walnut Bend was zoned to Lee High School.
