= Shenandoah, Houston =

Subdivision in Houston, Texas, United States

Coordinates: 29.711°N 95.485°W

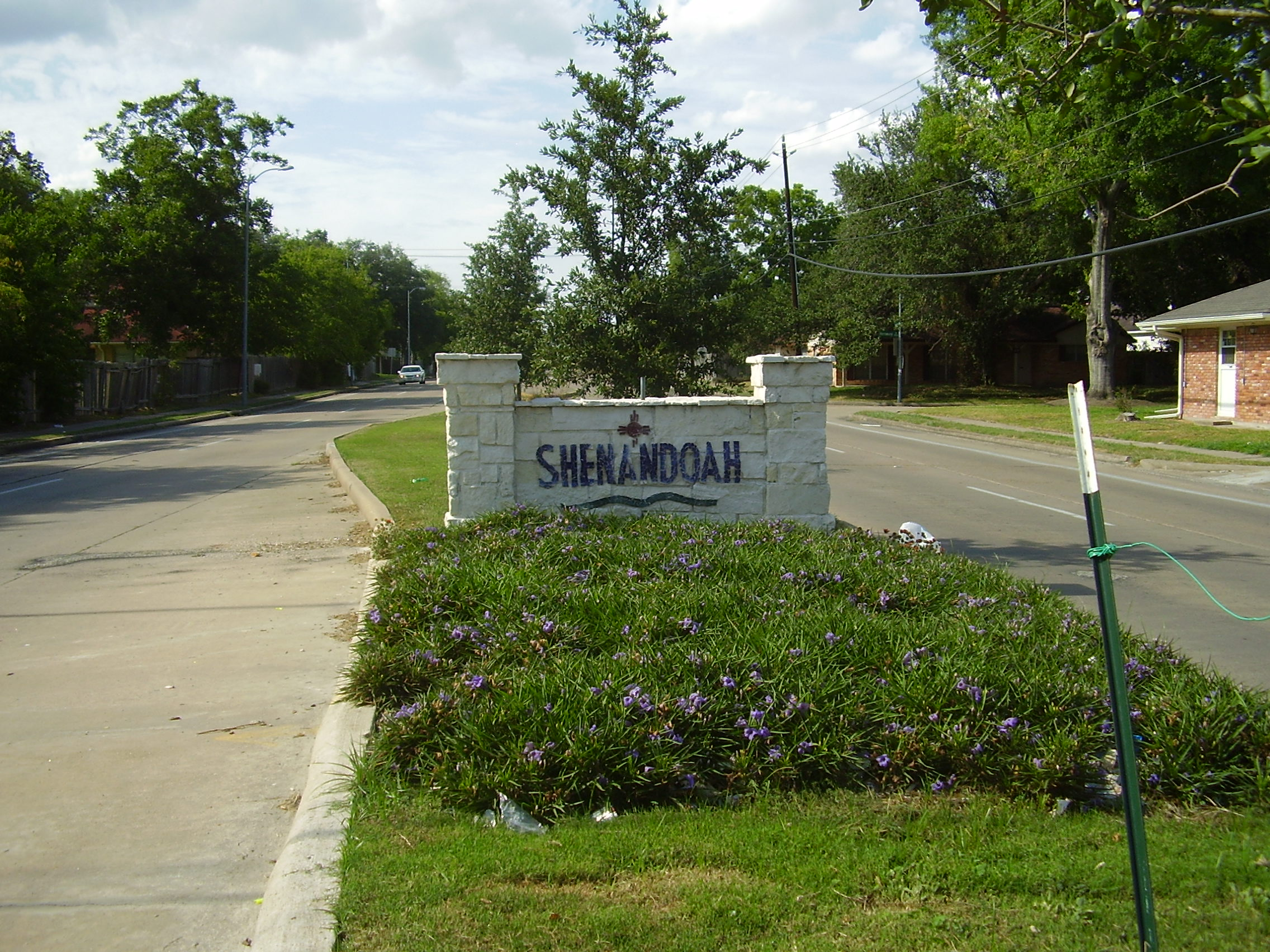
Shenandoah

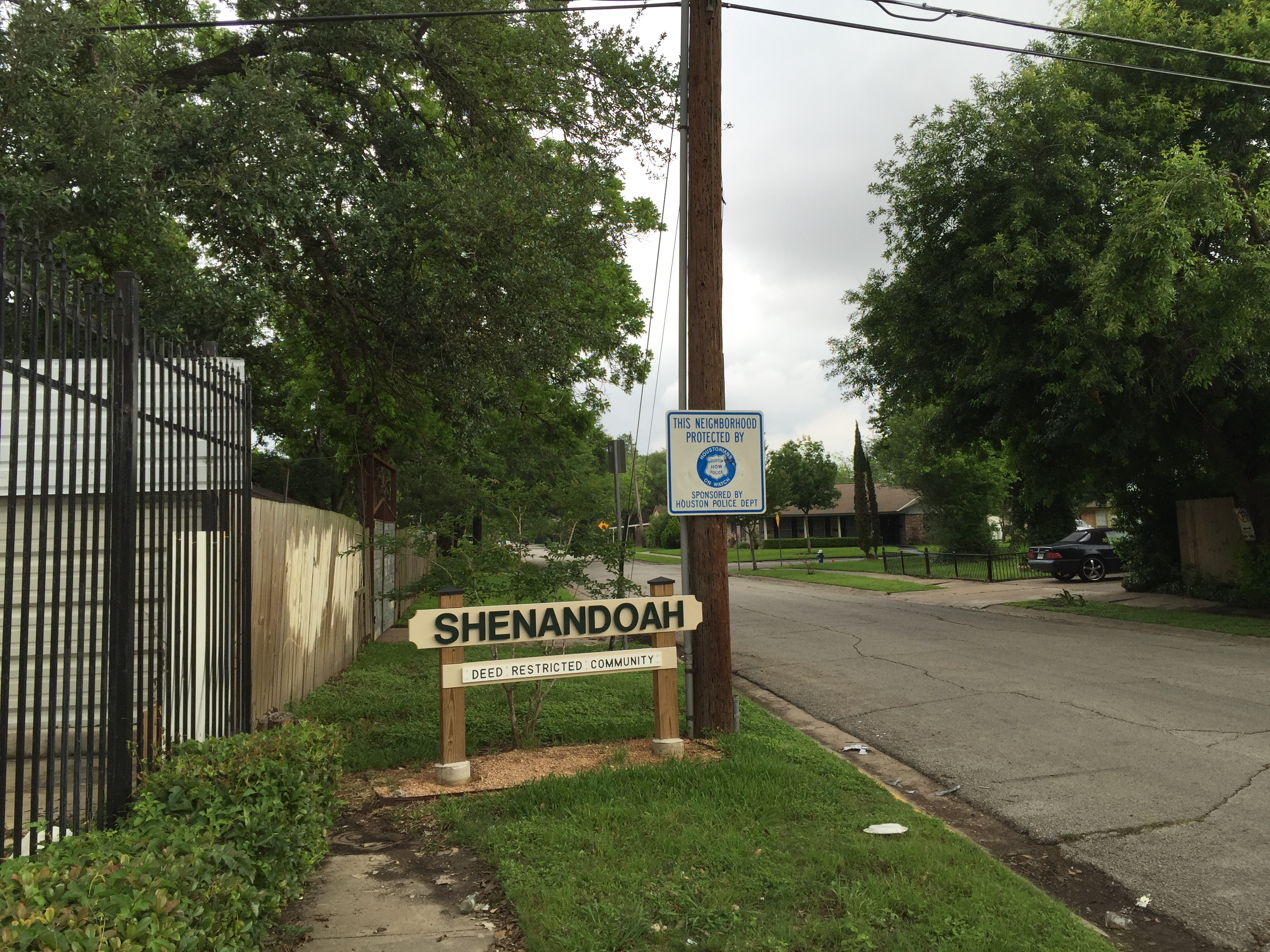
Shenandoah

Shenandoah is a subdivision in Houston, Texas, United States.

Shenandoah, located outside the 610 Loop, inside Beltway 8, and south and east of U.S. Highway 59 (Southwest Freeway), is surrounded by a community of apartment complexes called Gulfton. Shenandoah's sections include Shenandoah Section 1, Shenandoah Section 2, Shenandoah Section 3. The Shenandoah Civic Association has control over all of these sections and also controls a portion of the neighboring Sigrid subdivision.

== History ==
Shenandoah, the first subdivision in the area, opened in the mid-1950s on former greenfield. Shenandoah had 16 blocks of ranch-style homes. The Shenandoah Civic Association opened in 1956; since the City of Houston has no zoning, the Shenandoah Civic Association's main goal is to enforce deed restrictions which regulate construction of housing and prevent businesses being operated from homes.

Robert Fisher and Lisa Taafe, authors of the 1997 article Public Life in Gulfton: Multiple Publics and Models of Organization, said that the sudden demographic shifts in the late 1970s and 1980s "profoundly affected" Shenandoah as bars, warehouses, and nightclubs appeared next to Shenandoah houses. Many area apartment owners let their units decay from a lack of maintenance. The factors threatened Shenandoah property values, therefore the Shenandoah Civic Association added a security patrol, lobbied for the Houston City Council to end liquor licenses of bars adjacent to Shenandoah, engaged in neighborhood beautification, and supported the establishment of a Houston Police Department storefront in Gulfton. Generally the Shenandoah Civic Association did not involve itself in matters related to the apartments surrounding the subdivision.

In April 1992 Bob Lanier, the Mayor of Houston, named Gulfton as one of ten Houston neighborhoods targeted by a city revitalization program. One aspect of Lanier's project consisted of building barricades around the Shenandoah subdivision to reduce traffic and crime; the Shenandoah Civic Association supported and pursued the street closures. The Gulfton Area Neighborhood Organization (GANO) opposed Shenandoah's barricading. All of the other advocacy groups, except for some GAAC members, opposed the closure. Members of the community groups said that the closure has racist motives, that the closures would not effectively control crime, that the city was not using funds wisely, and that the closures would harm local businesses.

Fisher and Taafe that the Shenandoah Civic Association was a conservative organization made of mostly middle class residents that aimed to maintain the neighborhood and its property values. Fisher and Taafe said that after Central American Refugee Center (CARECEN) merged into GANO, the combined organization was unlikely to cooperate with the Shenandoah Civic Association. In November 1995, when the Texas State Legislature established a juvenile crime prevention grant for Gulfton, GANO cooperated with the Shenandoah Civic Association to accomplish the goal.

== Education ==
=== Primary and secondary schools ===
Shenandoah is within the Houston Independent School District.

Cunningham Elementary School serves Shenandoah Section 1, Shenandoah Section 2, and Shenandoah Section 3. Braeburn Elementary School serves Sigrid. Shenandoah is zoned to Jane Long Middle School, with Pin Oak Middle School as an option, and Margaret Long Wisdom High School (formerly Robert E. Lee High School), with Lamar and Westside high schools as options.

Cunningham Elementary School opened in 1953, Braeburn Elementary School opened in 1956, Long Middle School opened in 1958, and Lee High School opened in 1962. In the early 2000s, Braeburn served portions of Shenandoah Section 1 and Shenandoah Section 2, while serving all of Shenandoah Section 3 and Sigrid. Cunningham served the parts of Shenandoah Section 1 and Shenandoah Section 2 not covered by Braeburn. When Westside opened in 2000, residents of the Lee attendance boundary gained the option to attend Westside instead of Lee, with no free transportation provided.
