= Walnut Bend Elementary School =

Elementary school in Houston, Texas

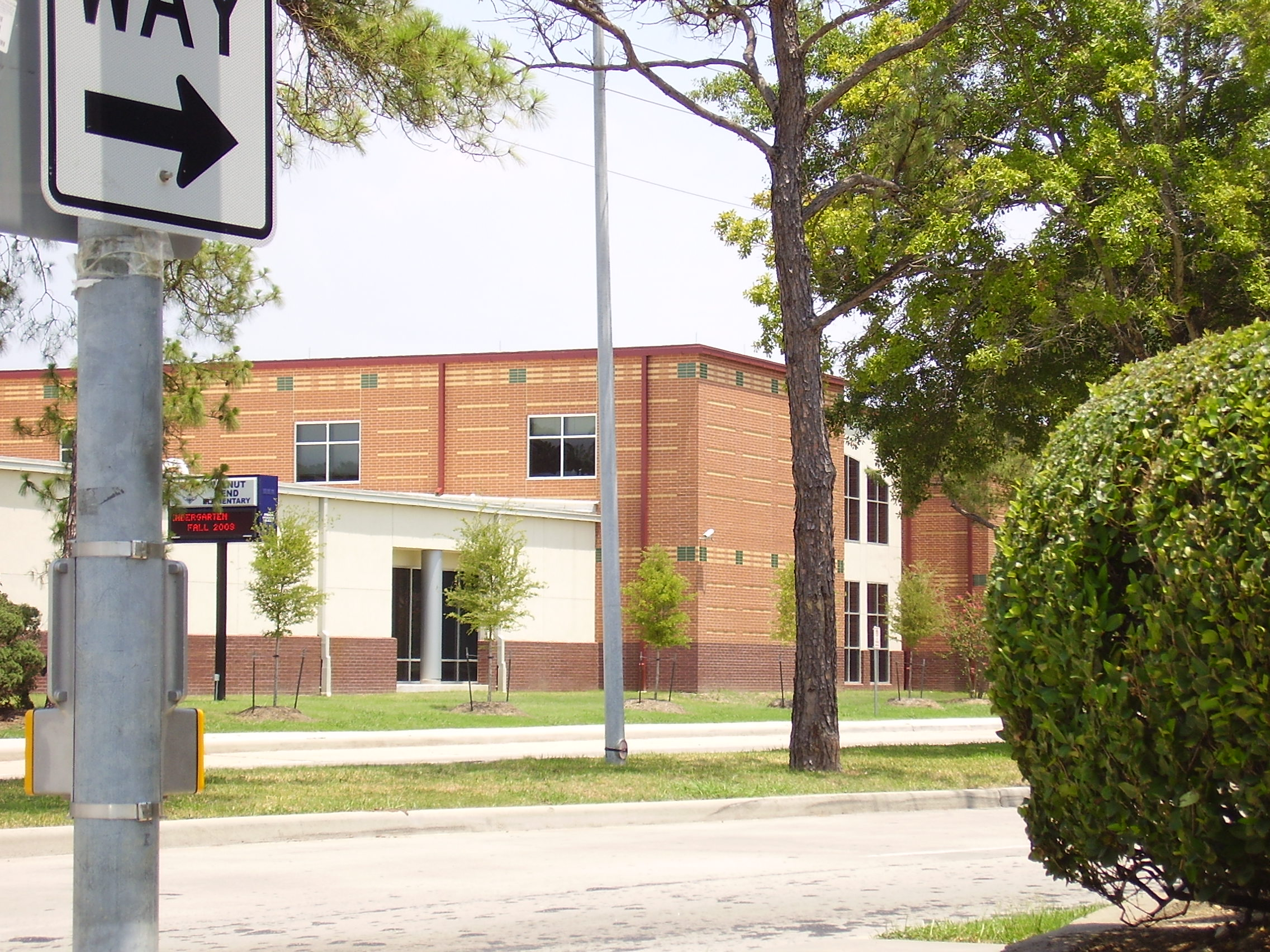

Location
- 10620 Briar Forest Drive; Houston, TX 77042
- Coordinates: 29°44′51″N 95°33′49″W

Information
- School type: Public, Elementary School
- Founded: 1960
- School district: Houston Independent School District
- Principal: Alecia McMillian
- Grades: PreK-5
- Enrollment: 796
- Language: English
- Colors: Orange and Blue
- Team name: The Eagles
- Website: www.houstonisd.org/domain/21633

Walnut Bend Elementary School is a primary school located in Houston, Texas. As a result of a bond proposal passed in 2002, it has been completely rebuilt over the old school; it was the first LEED "Green School" in the Houston Independent School District (HISD).

The school serves the Walnut Bend and Briargrove Park areas and a portion of Rivercrest, Lakeside Estates and Lakeside Forest.

== History ==
Walnut Bend opened in 1964. On Tuesday, January 21, 1992, Barbara Bush Elementary School opened, relieving Walnut Bend and two other area elementary schools. Sands Point Elementary School, an unzoned reliever school in the Westchase district, opened in 1998 to relieve Walnut Bend and some other area schools.

In 2002, Houston voters approved an $808.6 million bond issue to "Rebuild HISD", which included a $13.2 million allocation to the old Walnut Bend Elementary. The original school was built in 1960 and could not sustain all of the elementary-grade students in its attendance zone. The original school was demolished, making way for a new school that could handle more students. At the same time, it was the first HISD school to apply for LEED certification.

After Hurricane Katrina occurred, Walnut Bend Elementary School's enrollment increased from around 600 to around 800 with the addition of 184 hurricane refugees; Walnut Bend, out of all of the Houston-area elementary schools, took the most Katrina victims. Five years after Katrina, however, the population and testing scores of the school have returned to pre-Katrina levels.

== Vanguard Program ==
Walnut Bend Elementary Vanguard Program students participate in the Houston Independent School District Exploration Expo. Each student conducts a research project on a particular topic. Each student answered questions during the exposition. Each grade level focused on a different subject ranging from Texas History to geography and are required to give presentations on those topics.

== School Activities ==
Walnut Bend Elementary offers a number of activities that children may participate. These activities include Art Club, Basketball Team, Chess Club, Choir, Eagles Nest, Name That Book, Orchestra, Running Club, and Tennis Club.

== School uniforms ==
Walnut Bend requires its students to wear school uniforms.

== Attendance Zone and Feeder Patterns ==
Walnut Bend Elementary School Attendance Zone is bounded:

- on the South by Westheimer Road
- on the East by East Rivercrest between Westheimer Road and Buffalo Bayou
- on the North by Buffalo Bayou from Walnut Bend to Westheimer Road, on Cranbrook from Lakeside to Walnut Bend, and on Lynbrook from Wilcrest to Lakeside

and

- on the West by Wilcrest from Westheimer Road to Lynbrook, on Lakeside from Lynbrook to Cranbrook, and on Walnut Bend from Cranbrook to Buffalo Bayou.

The school serves the Walnut Bend and Briargrove Park areas and a portion of Rivercrest.

All residents of the Revere attendance boundary are zoned to Paul Revere Middle School (or West Briar Middle School as an option ) and Westside High School .
