= Westside High School (Houston) =

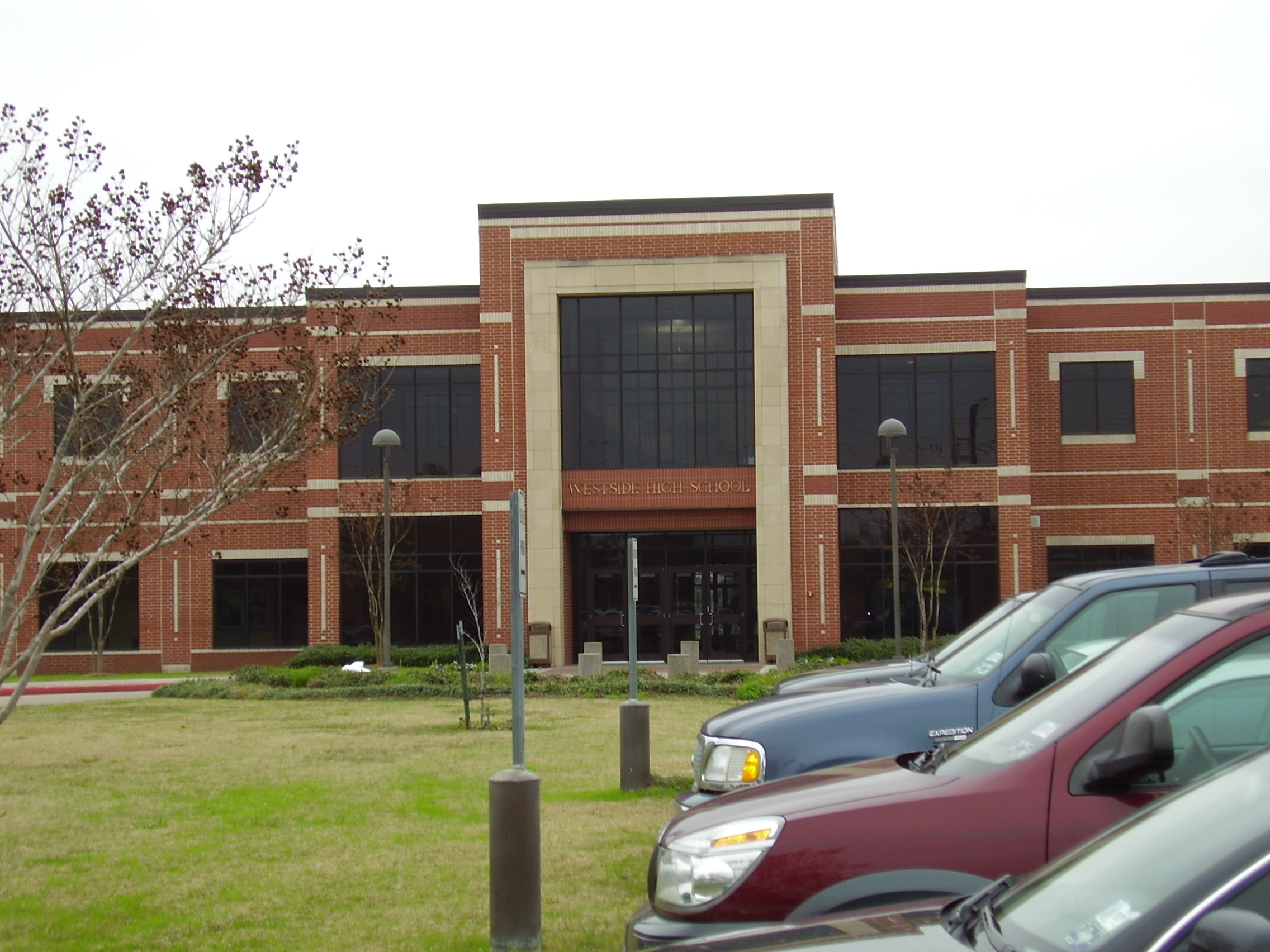
- Front of Westside High School

Location
- 14201 Briar Forest Drive; Houston, Texas 77077; 29°45′34″N 95°38′16″W

Information
- School type: Suburban public secondary school
- Founded: 2000; 26 years ago
- School district: Houston Independent School District
- NCES District ID: 4823640
- Educational authority: Texas Education Agency
- Superintendent: Mike Miles
- CEEB code: 443522
- NCES School ID: 482364008816
- Principal: Alisa C. Zapata
- Teaching staff: 145.61 (FTE)
- Grades: 9-12
- Enrollment: 2,729 (2024-2025)
  - Grade 9: 826
  - Grade 10: 669
  - Grade 11: 626
  - Grade 12: 608
- Student to teacher ratio: 18.74
- Language: English
- Colors: Blue, black, and silver
- Mascot: Westley The Wolf
- Team name: Wolves
- Newspaper: The Howler
- Yearbook: Canidae
- Communities served: portions of the Westchase District, South Eldridge Parkway portion of the Houston Energy Corridor, Walnut Bend, Briargrove Park, Lakes of Parkway, Parkway Villages, and Briarhills
- Website: westside.houstonisd.org

Westside High School is a secondary school in Houston, Texas, United States. It serves grades 9 through 12 and is part of the Houston Independent School District.

The school is located at 14201 Briar Forest in Houston, Texas, in the 77077 zip code. Westside High School is outside of Beltway 8, east of State Highway 6, inside State Highway 99 (Grand Parkway), and south of Interstate 10 (Katy Freeway) in the Briar Forest area.

Westside is HISD's Magnet School for Integrated Technology. The program allows students to look at technology from one of five aspects: Fine Arts, Business, Media Relations, Applied Science/Health Science, and Computing Sciences. During the first year, all Magnet students take a technology survey course, a modular course that introduces them to the five strands of the program. The second year, students are asked to choose one of the five strands on which to focus their elective courses.

The school's academic programs, ranked #463, #196, #230, #245, and #1,958th in Newsweek magazine's 2005, 2006 2007, 2008, and 2013 lists, respectively, of the top 2,000 high schools in the United States.

As of 2006, many students in other parts of Houston ISD transferred to Westside to escape high schools that do not have a good academic performance, causing the attendance figures of those schools to suffer.

Westside athletics compete as the Westside Wolves, and the school's mascot is Wesley the Wolf.

== History ==
Westside opened in 2000 as a brand-new fifty-million-dollar building, taking about 1,000 students from Lee High School (now Margaret Long Wisdom High School), which was experiencing overcrowding. Westside planned to compete with Bellaire and Lamar high schools in Houston ISD for "premier" status. It initially had a reputation as a school that could attract private school students to a public school. When Westside opened, residents of the Lee attendance boundary were given the option to attend Westside instead of Lee, with no free transportation provided. The school at first had 1,772 students, including 340 students who, in the previous school year, were not enrolled in HISD. Westside is so-named because it is located in western Houston.

Scott Van Beck was the first principal of Westside. In 2005 he was promoted to being the West District head. Later in that year, Paul Castro became Westside principal; he was 29 at the time he had his first school principal job. That year about 300 students from New Orleans, displaced by Hurricane Katrina, enrolled at Westside, causing overcrowding and making the overall student population over 3,000. According to the October 2006 HISD "For Your Information" newsletter, Westside was one of four high schools that took the most refugees from Hurricane Katrina.

By March 2006, Westside had posted slightly lower SAT and graduation rates than Lamar and Bellaire. In a March 2006 Houston Press article, Dr. Robert Sanborn, the president and CEO of the organization Children at Risk, said that Westside's "slow progress", as paraphrased by the article's author Todd Spivak, was more disappointing than Lamar and Bellaire's dropout rates.

In fall of the 2008–2009 school year, a petroleum academy by the name of Westside Engineering and Geosciences Academy was opened at Westside High School.

In 2007, 6% of high school-aged children zoned to Westside chose to attend alternative Houston ISD schools.

In 2010, Richard Connelly of the Houston Press said that Westside became "something of a success story for HISD."

In 2010, Castro was transferred to become the new principal of Lee High School (now Margaret Long Wisdom High School).

Westside won the Division II State Lacrosse title in 2004. Westside High School's rugby team incorporated with a public high school in the Houston Independent School District. The Westside Wrestling program has won Districts for the past 10 years and has had four individual state champions.

Westside High School won its first SECME State Competition in 2008.

== Campus ==
Westside is on a 50-acre (20 ha) campus, located along Briar Forest Road, near Texas State Highway 6. Several gated communities are in proximity to the school.

The school was built for $50 million. The school has one auditorium, two theaters, four athletic fields, 11 music practice rooms, an orchestra hall, a band hall, a broadcast studio, a ceramics studio, and computer labs. Melissa Hung of the Houston Press wrote in 2000 that "The eating area resembles a college food court more than a high school cafeteria."

== Athletics ==
Westside High School athletics logo

Westside High School's sports' mascot is the "Wolf". The girls' teams are sometimes known as the "Lady Wolves". Sports at the school include:

- American football
- Baseball
- Basketball (boys & girls)
- Cheerleading
- Cross-country (boys & girls)
- Golf (boys & girls)
- Lacrosse (boys & girls)
- Rugby (boys)
- Soccer (boys & girls)
- Softball
- Swimming/diving (boys & girls)
- Tennis (boys & girls)
- Track & field (boys & girls)
- Volleyball
- Water polo (boys & girls)
- Wrestling (boys & girls)

== Organizations and clubs ==
Westside has about 50 clubs and organizations in addition to its athletic programs.

=== Special interest ===
Asian Cultural Society, Black Student Union, BSA Advancement, BPA, Chinese Club, , Close Up, Drone Club, Ecology Club, EOE Step Club, Fellowship of Christian Athletes, Fitness Club, FRC, French Club, Friends Club, Future Farmers of America, Future Teachers of America, Gaming/Anime Club, Gay-Straight Alliance, Guitar Hero Club, History Club, HOSA, Hot Air Balloon Club, Howlin' Respect, Humanities, Investment Club, Key Club, Korean Pop Culture Club (K-Pop), Latin Club, Math Club, Mental Health Awareness Club, Movie Buffs, Muslim Student Alliance, Theatre Production, Technical Theatre, Playwrighting They Say Literacy Magazine Club, SECME, Skills USA, Young Democrats, VEX robotics, Young Liberal Minds of America Young Republicans, Wolf of Wall Street, W.O.R.D.

=== Performing arts ===
Art Club (2D and 3D Animation, Drawing and Painting), National Thespian Honor Society, Orchestra, Band, Speech and Debate Team, Tri-Music Honor Society, Westside Choir, Westside Pride Dance Team, JV Inertia Dance Company, Inertia Dance Company, Colorguard, and Marching Band.

=== Academics and honors ===
Asian Honor Society, National Honor Society, Spanish National Honor Society, Quiz Bowl, Westside Engineering and Geosciences Academy, and the Academic Scientific Demonstration Club

=== Service and spirit ===
Cheerleaders, Drill Team, Ecology Club, Interact Club, Key Club, JROTC, L.I.F.E, Recycling Club, S.A.V.E. Club, SADD, Marching Band and Colorguard

=== News ===
Canidae (yearbook), The Howler (newspaper)

== Outback program ==
Westside has a three-year entrepreneurship program designed by the National Restaurant Education Foundation to teach students about how businesses run. Outback Steakhouse sponsors the program and helped build a full-scale commercial kitchen and dining hall directly into the school.

The school utilizes the restaurant as part of an entrepreneurship course, titled "Entrepreneur 101: Realizing the American Dream." The course, using a curriculum designed by the Texas Restaurant Association Education Foundation (TRAEF), involves classroom study for first year (freshmen) students and restaurant operation performed by second year (sophomore) and third year (junior) students, supervised by Outback general managers and teachers. As of 2003 there were six classes with a combined total of 140 students.

Students learn the production aspect of the restaurant business in addition to basic business principles and cooking methods in the first year of the program, culminating in ServSafe certification by the end of the second year.

Aside from the program itself, the restaurant is open to students and the general public during lunchtime hours in the school year. Outback also caters exclusively for school functions.

== Areas served ==
When Westside opened in 2000, it relieved Margaret Long Wisdom High School, then known as Lee High School, of about 1,000 students that year.

The Westside High School zone covers small portions of the Westchase district that are north of Westheimer Road and the South Eldridge Parkway portion of the Houston Energy Corridor. Westside also covers several other neighborhoods, including Ashford Hill, Ashford West, Ashford South, the Houston ISD part of Ashford Forest, Walnut Bend, Briar Oaks, Briargrove Park, Briar Village, Briarhills, Lakeside Enclave, Lakeside Forest, Lakeside Landing, Lakeside Place, Parkway Villages, Reflections, Shadowbriar, and April Village.

Several gated communities, including Lakes of Parkway, are zoned to Westside High School.

Students residing in the Margaret Long Wisdom (formerly known as Lee) attendance zone, including the Uptown district, the neighborhoods of Briargrove, Briarcroft, Larchmont, Briar Meadow, Tanglewood, Gulfton, Tanglewilde, Shenandoah, Sharpstown Country Club Estates, Woodlake Forest, West Oaks, Jeanetta, and St. George Place (Lamar Terrace) and small portions of Westchase east of Gessner, may go to Lamar High, Margaret Long Wisdom High, or Westside High School. Small portions of the city of Hunters Creek Village and Piney Point Village are zoned to Margaret Long Wisdom with Lamar and Westside as options.

In late 2005, the school absorbed more than 200 refugees from Hurricane Katrina who had moved into the Westside zone.

As of 2017, residents of the Westside zone are eligible for a transfer to Lamar High School.

== Feeder patterns ==
=== Feeding from the Westside boundary ===
Elementary schools that directly feed into Westside include:

- Ashford (Pre-K through 2)
- Askew (Kindergarten through 5)
- Barbara Bush
- Daily
- Walnut Bend
- Emerson (partial) (the rest of Emerson indirectly feeds into Westside)

Middle schools that directly feed into Westside include all of West Briar and parts of Revere. Residents of the Westside attendance zone and the Revere attendance zone may apply to West Briar.

Residents zoned to Ashford, Askew, Bush, Daily, Emerson, and Walnut Bend may attend Shadowbriar Elementary School; therefore it is a feeder school for Westside.

Residents of the Emerson Elementary School attendance zone may apply for the Briarmeadow Charter School, so the K-8 school feeds into Westside.

=== Feeding from the Margaret Long Wisdom boundary ===
Other schools also feed into Westside, since students zoned to Margaret Long Wisdom High School have the option to go to Westside High School or Lamar High School.

- Briargrove
- Benavidez
- Piney Point
- Rodriguez

(portions)

- Braeburn
- Condit
- Cunningham
- Emerson
- St. George Place
- Sutton

Middle schools that feed into Lee (and therefore also feed into Westside) include:

- Grady

Partial:

- Long
- Pershing
- Revere

K-8 schools that feed into Lee (and therefore also feed into Westside) include:

- Pilgrim

All pupils zoned to Long and Pershing Middle Schools may attend Pin Oak Middle School. Accordingly, Pin Oak also feeds into Lee High School.

Residents of the Briargrove, Emerson, Pilgrim, and Piney Point elementary attendance zones may apply for the Briarmeadow Charter School, so the K-8 school feeds into Lee.

Residents zoned to Emerson may attend Shadowbriar Elementary School; therefore it is a feeder school for Wisdom (and therefore, Westside).

=== Feeding from magnet schools ===
Some students who graduate from T. H. Rogers School in the 8th grade choose to go to Westside.

=== Feeding from private schools ===
Students of some private schools, such as Grace School, John Paul II School, and Presbyterian School, matriculate to Westside.

== Transportation ==
Houston ISD provides school buses for students who live more than 2 miles (3.2 km) away from the school or who have major obstacles between their houses and the school. Students are eligible if they are zoned to Westside or are in the Westside magnet program.

A METRO bus stop (Briar Forest Drive @ Briar Home Drive) is located next to the school. Bus line 153 (Downtown/Galleria) stops at Briar Forest and Briar Home.

== Notable people ==
- Warith Alatishe - Ontario Clippers forward
- Wesley Van Beck - basketball player
- Sydney Colson - WNBA player and NCAA national champion with Texas A&M Aggies women's basketball
- Ian Gunther - gymnast and member of the United States men's national artistic gymnastics team
- Germain Ifedi - NFL offensive lineman
- Martin Ifedi- NFL player
- Jeffrey Louis - Olympic athlete in breakdancing in the 2024 Summer Olympics
- Daniel Mengden - MLB pitcher
- Cierra Ramirez - actress on hit TV show The Fosters
- Shannon Shorter - basketball player
- Payton Turner - NFL defensive end
- Daniel Utomi - professional basketball player
- Jordan Elliott - NFL defensive tackle

== See also ==
- List of Houston Independent School District schools
