= Harvey Kronberg =

American journalist and political figure in Texas

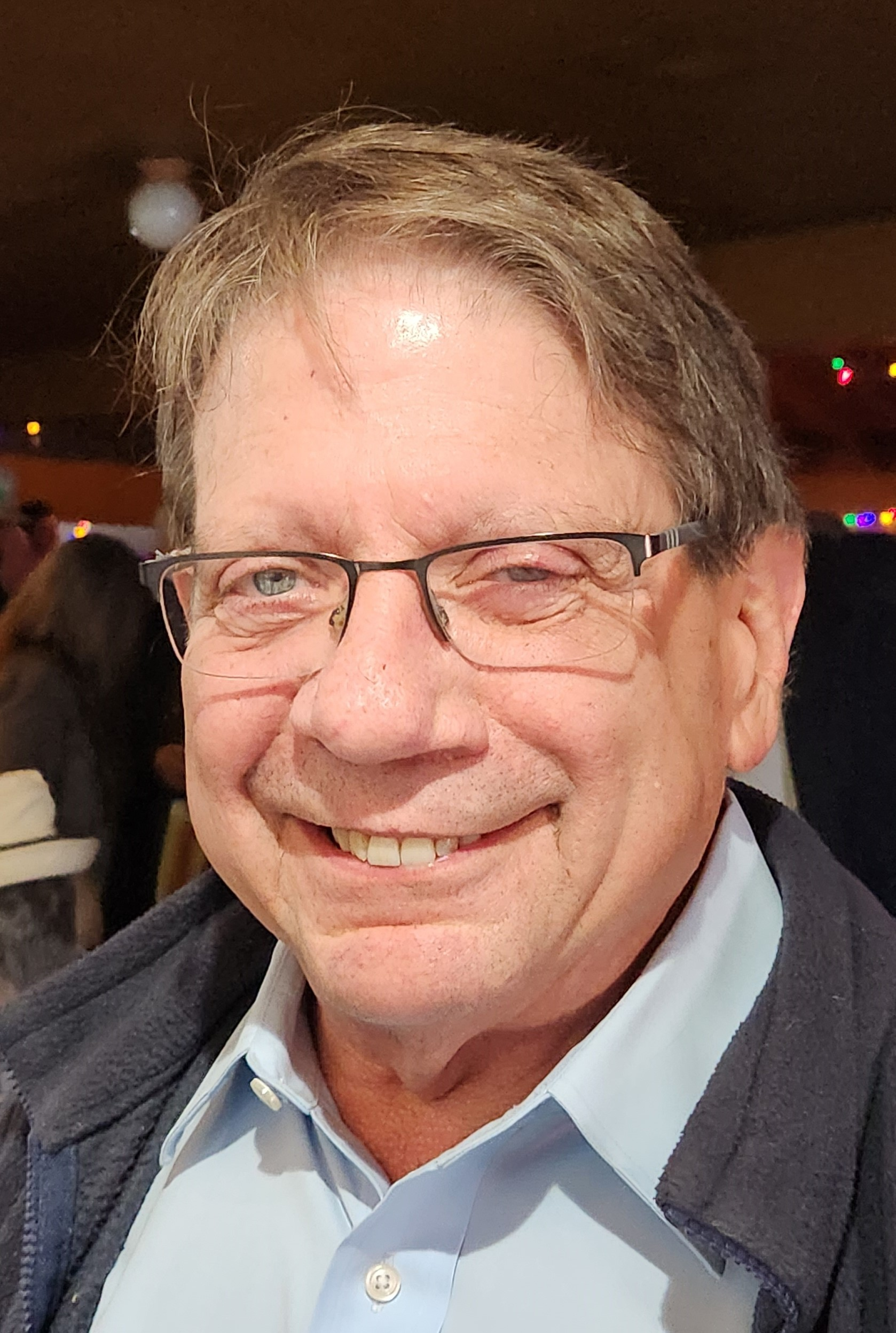
Harvey Kronberg, Texas political journalist

Harvey Kronberg (born 1950) is an American journalist who owns and edits the Quorum Report, an online publication covering Texas politics. In 2005, Texas Monthly named Kronberg as one of the 25 most powerful people in Texas politics.

== Early life and education ==
Kronberg is from Houston and graduated from Bellaire High School in 1968, then went to the University of Texas at Austin, graduating in 1972. After graduation, he worked for several years as a licensed auctioneer and by his own account he "worked really hard at being a hippie", reading Marx, and peddling clothes at flea markets. However, within a few years he had become a committed businessman with a strong interest in politics. He and his wife Michele have been together since 1975.

== Quorum Report ==
Kronberg began his Texas politics career as a contract writer for the Quorum Report in 1989. Founded in 1983, the publication is Texas's oldest political insiders newsletter. In 1998, Kronberg acquired the Quorum Report, converting into an exclusively online subscriber based publication covering Texas politics and government, targeted to the political professional. By 2005, Texas Monthly declared Kronberg one of the 25 most powerful people in Texas politics and dubbed him the "Capitol's scribe", stating that the Quorum Report had "become required reading for Austin politicos". The publication has long been the preferred publication of insider Texas politics, and Kronberg the insider's insider.

Harvey Kronberg and his team at the Quorum Report were early Internet news pioneers. Within a year of purchasing the Quorum Report, then a print-only political newsletter, they had turned it into a successful all-web news operation. Although much of the online content was given away for free, Kronberg kept more valuable content behind a limited paywall, inducing political junkies to subscribe.

The Quorum Report has been quoted in publications such as The Wall Street Journal, The New York Times, The Dallas Morning News, the Houston Chronicle, Congressional Quarterly, and The Christian Science Monitor, among others.

== Professional life ==
In addition to owning and operating the Quorum Report, Kronberg launched a sister site, The Texas Energy Report, an online publication focused on politics and Texas's energy industry.

Kronberg is also a political analyst for Spectrum News. Kronberg makes regular appearances on the channel's Capital Tonight program and also appeared on the weekly political commentary show, "On the Agenda", when the network was owned by TimeWarner.

Kronberg conducts the annual auction for the Wine and Food Foundation of Texas and serves on their board. He also conducts auctions for the Heartgift Foundation and the Austin Lyric Opera. He and his wife, Michele, started the Austin Flag and Flagpole company in 1986. It is the largest full service flagpole company in Central Texas.
