= Leemore Dafny =

American economist

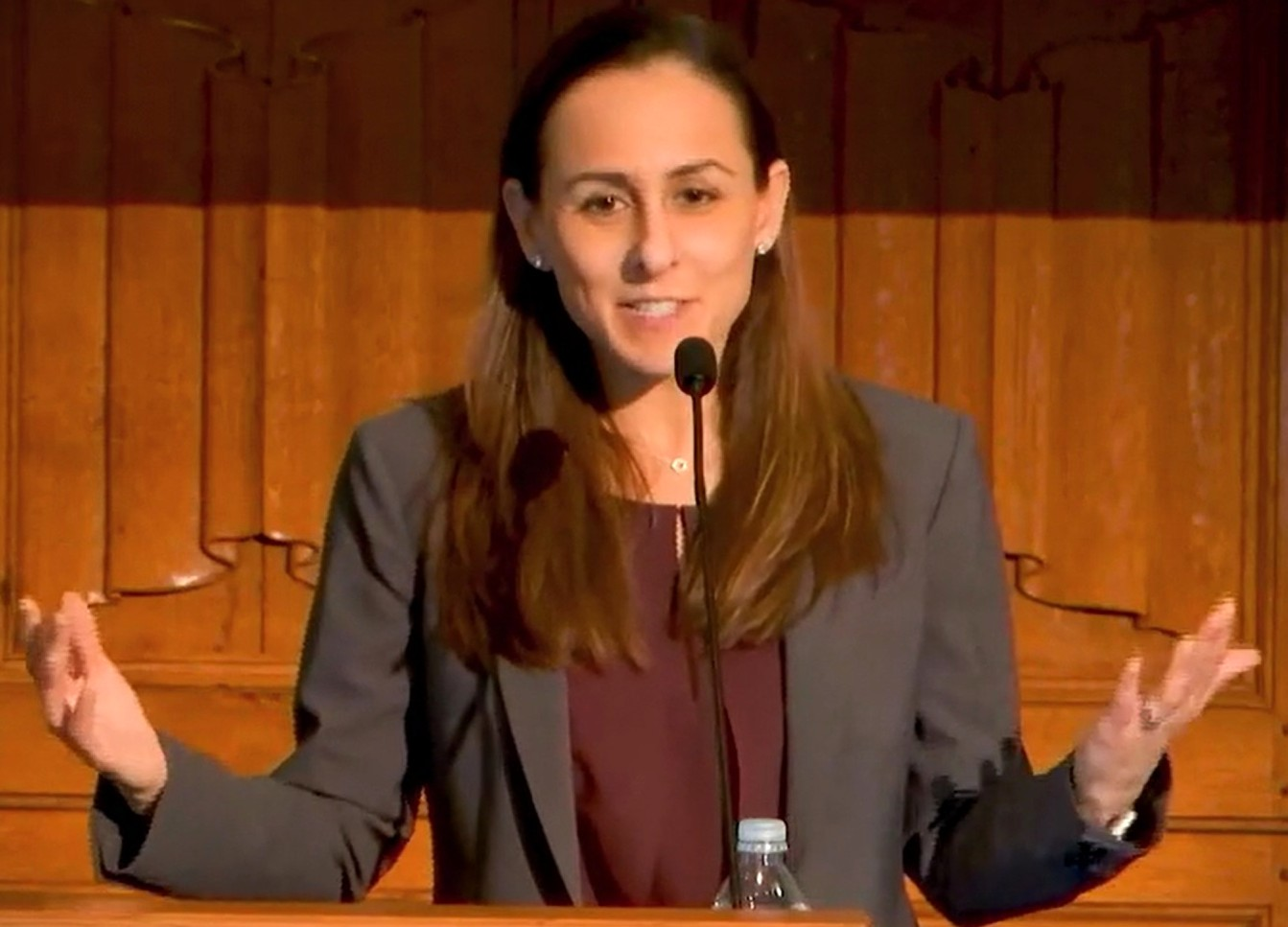
Dafny in 2019

Leemore S. Dafny is an American economist currently the Bruce V. Rauner Professor of Business Administration at Harvard Business School and a member of the faculty at John F. Kennedy School of Government. She graduated from Harvard College and received a PhD in Economics from Massachusetts Institute of Technology.

Between 2012 and 2013, Dafny was deputy director for healthcare and antitrust in the Bureau of Economics at the Federal Trade Commission. She was elected a Member of the National Academy of Medicine in 2024.
