= Lakes of Parkway, Houston =

Community in Texas, United States

Coordinates: 29.748°N 95.633°W

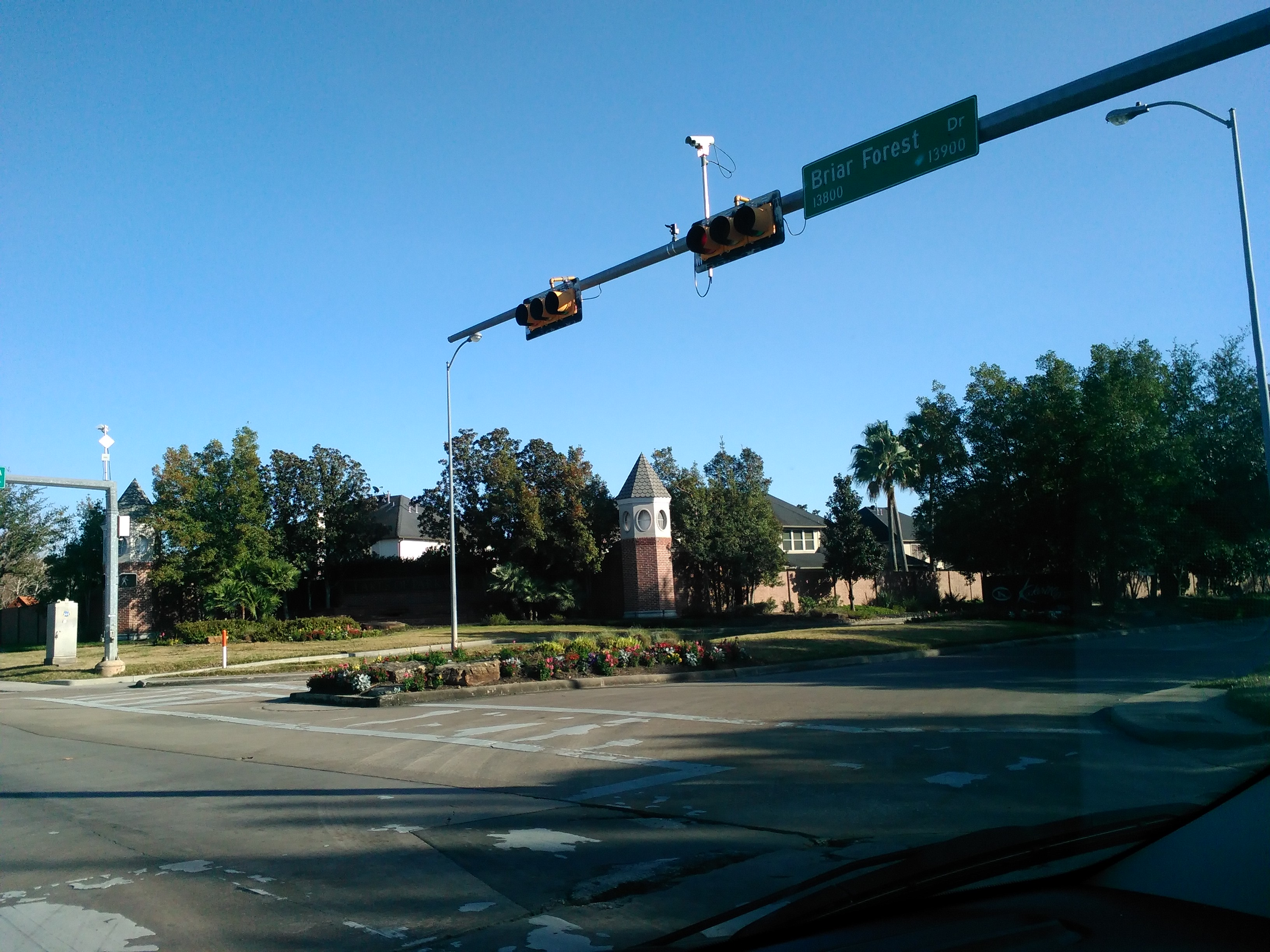
Subdivision entrance

Lakes of Parkway is a gated community in western Houston, Texas, also the most southern community in the Energy Corridor. It has 888 lots. Peggy O'Hare of the Houston Chronicle stated in 2002 that the houses were "upscale".

== History ==
It was developed by Sueba USA Corp. and Kickerillo Cos., a homebuilder. The Hypo-Bank of New York, a branch of Hypo-Bank in Munich, financed the development of the subdivision.

Sueba USA, a subsidiary of Süba Freie Baugesellschaft, acquired a 330-acre (130 ha) tract from the Paul Barnhart family for $9.6 million in order to build a residential subdivision. This area was previously used as a cattle ranch. In 1993 Ralph Bivins of the Houston Chronicle stated that "The Barnhart tract is one of the biggest tracts of vacant land inside the Houston city limits." Barnhart owed $1 million in property taxes; because the purpose of the land was changing to commercial uses instead of agricultural uses, Sueba paid off the debt as part of the deal.

Kickerillo agreed to purchase half of the home sites in the tract to develop houses. Development began in 1995. By 1996 Kickerillo agreed to spend $60 million to purchase all of the homesites within the subdivision. Construction in Lakes of Parkway, built on the Barnhart tract, began in 1996. That year, Bivins wrote that Lakes on Parkway was "one of the largest upscale communities to be started inside the Houston city limits in years."

Peggy O'Hare of the Houston Chronicle wrote that in 2002, when adult entertainment businessperson Evan Howard Loewenstein moved to Lakes of Parkway, "he immediately drew attention" by installing security equipment and materials at his house and having a frequent entourage. Residents complained to the homeowners association because many cars were parked in front of the house, while they were required to be in the driveway. On May 12, 2005, federal agents and Houston Police Department (HPD) SWAT officers served a search warrant and arrested Loewenstein and his ex-wife, and a bank bought the foreclosed house for $700,000 ($1126989.27 when adjusted for inflation) at an auction in June 2005.

Development of new houses in Lakes of Parkway ended in 2009.

== Cityscape ==
The community, on 315 acres (127 ha) of land between Texas State Highway 6 and Eldridge Parkway and south of Briar Forest Drive, is in proximity to the southwest corner of Briar Forest Drive and Eldridge Parkway. It is south of and across from Parkway Villages, another subdivision developed by Sueba USA.

The plans for Lakes on Parkway stated that there would be 800 custom-built houses. For beautification reasons and for increasing drainage capabilities, plans included building seven lakes, placing them on 50 acres (20 ha) of the community's land.

As of 1993 the plans stated that the housing prices would range at the $200,000s ($435337.48 with inflation) to the $700,000s ($1523681.18 with inflation). By 1996 the planned price range was $225,000 ($451098.03 with inflation) to over $1 million ($2004880.12 with inflation).

Security guards monitor automobile traffic going into and out of the community.

== Government and infrastructure ==
Harris Health System (formerly Harris County Hospital District) designated Valbona Health Center (formerly People's Health Center) in Greater Sharpstown for ZIP code 77077. The nearest public hospital is Ben Taub General Hospital in the Texas Medical Center.

== Education ==
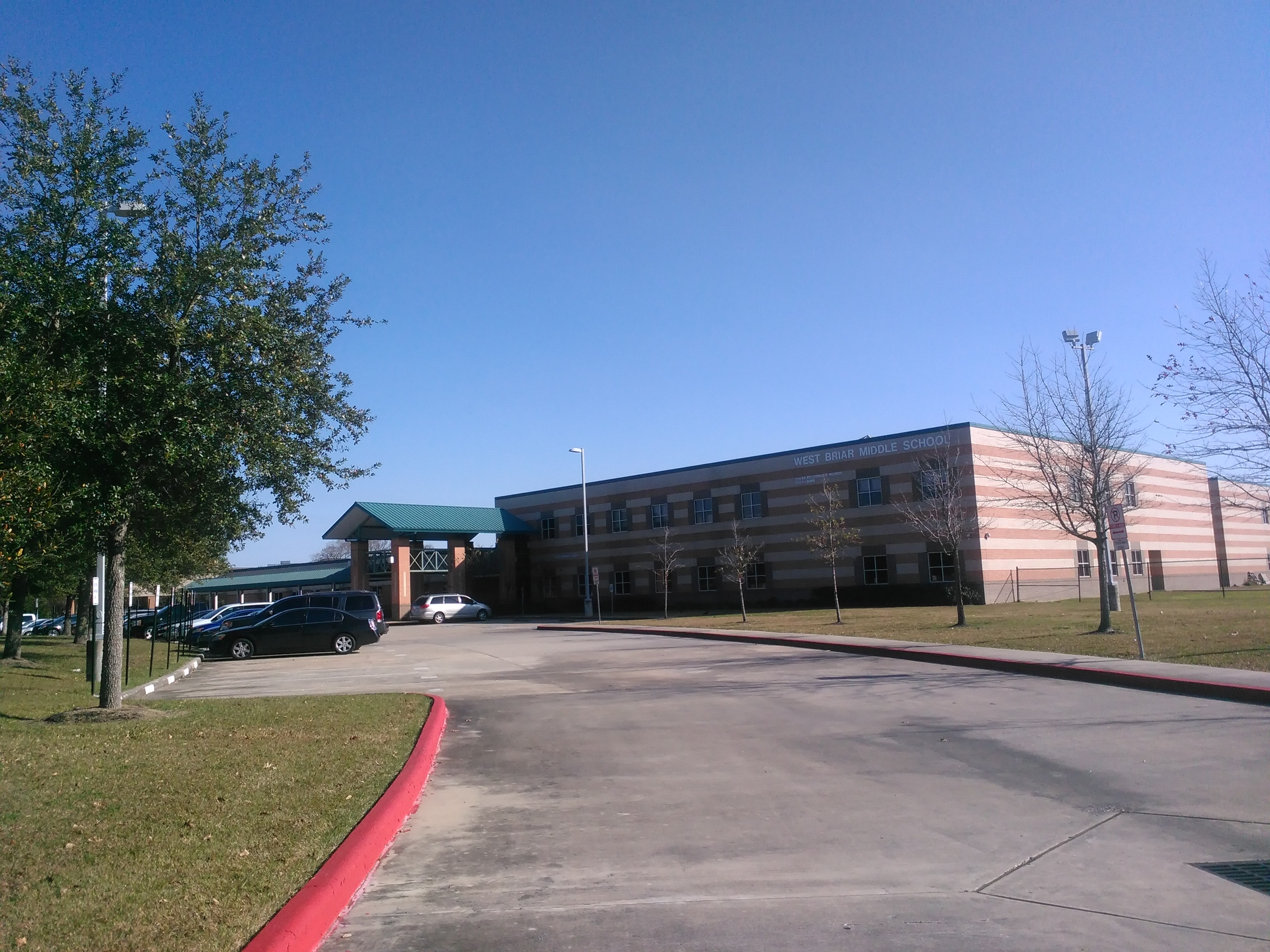
West Briar Middle School in Parkway Villages

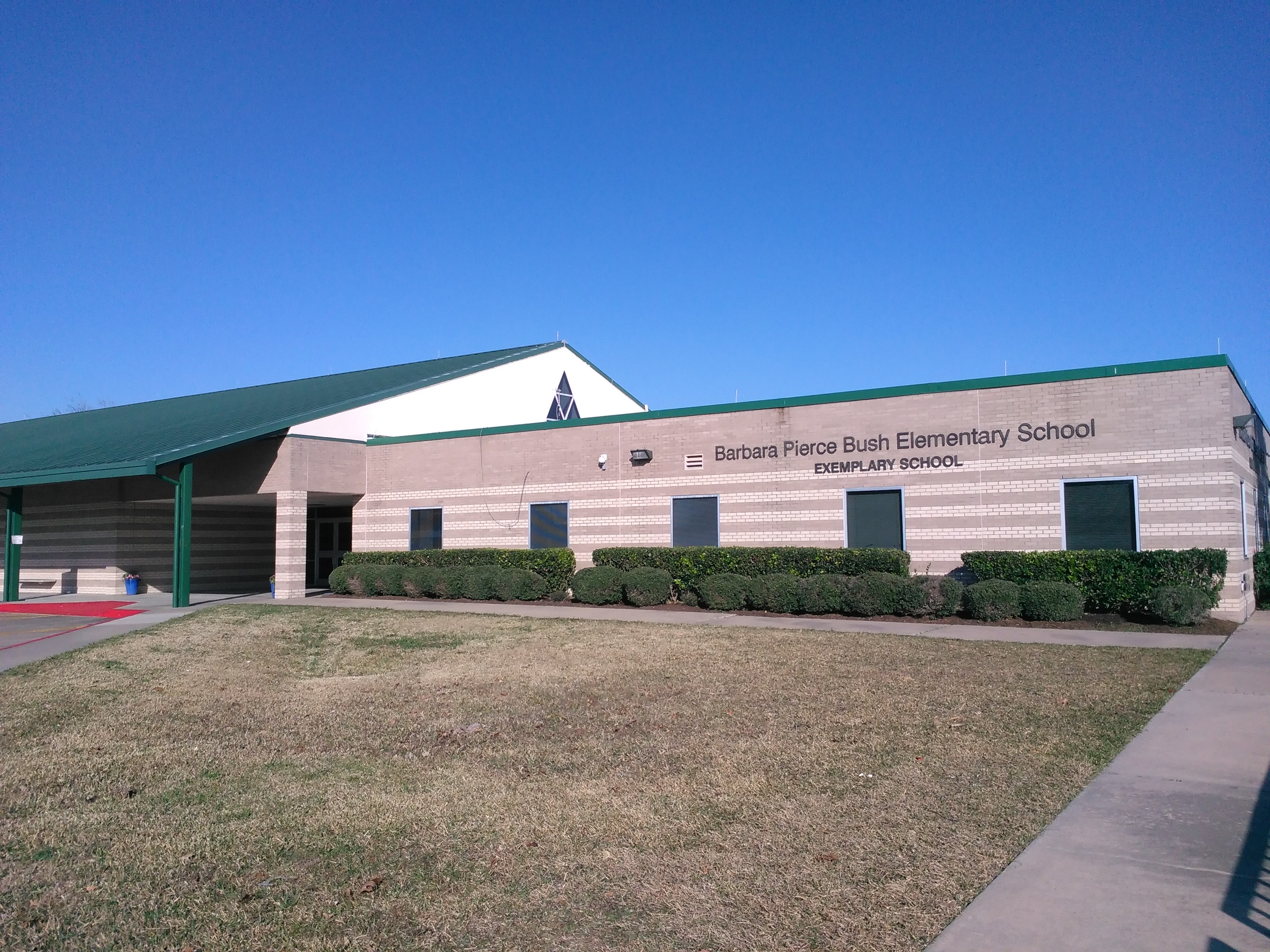
Barbara Bush Elementary School in Parkway Villages

Residents are zoned to the Houston Independent School District. The zoned schools are Barbara Bush Elementary School (in Parkway Villages), West Briar Middle School (in Parkway Villages), and Westside High School.

Residents zoned to Ashford, Askew, Bush, and Daily may attend Shadowbriar Elementary School's magnet program.

Bush opened in 1992. Westside opened in August 2000. West Briar, a name combining those of Westheimer Road and Briar Forest, opened in 2002. Previously residents were zoned to Revere Middle School, and Lee High School (now Margaret Long Wisdom High School).

In 2015 residents protested a plan to rezone the community to Daily Elementary School, which has not performed as well as Bush Elementary.

== Parks and recreation ==
One club is the Lakes of Parkway Women's Club. As of 2014 the club annually sends stockings to the Child Advocates organization.

== Notable residents ==
- John V. Singleton Jr. (retired federal judge)
