= Parkway Villages, Houston =

Subdivision in Texas, United States

Coordinates: 29.762°N 95.634°W

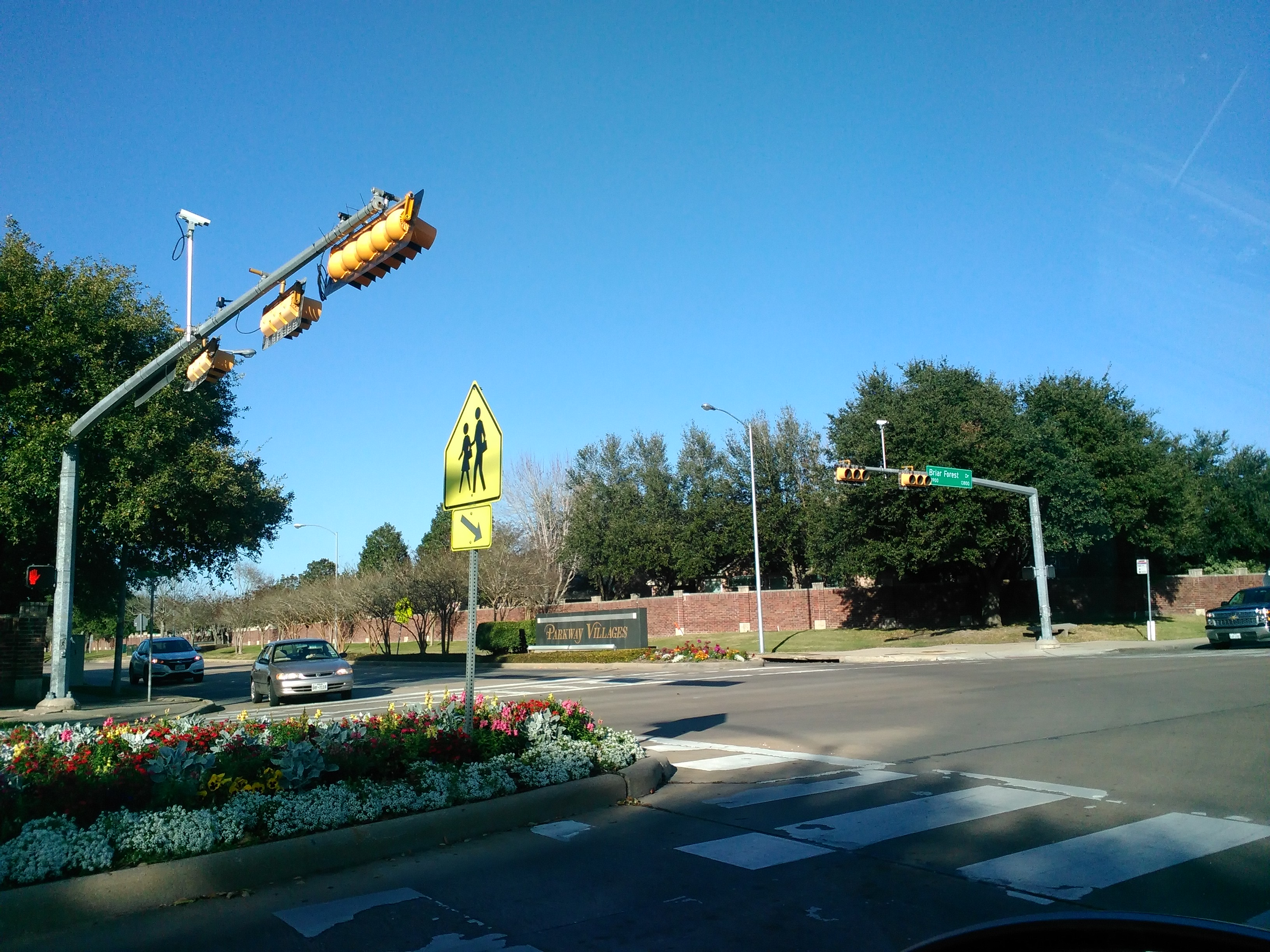
Subdivision entrance

Parkway Villages is a 577-lot, 224-acre (91 ha) subdivision in western Houston, Texas. It is located north of Lakes of Parkway, the former Barnhardt land tract. It was the first single family housing development by Sueba USA, a subsidiary of Süba Freie Baugesellschaft.

== History ==
The project's development began in 1993. It was developed in a joint venture between Sueba USA and Hypo-Bank of Munich. It was built in an area that was originally supposed to have a 563-acre (228 ha) office park. That office park, which had been developed for about $70 million, was not built due to the 1980s oil bust. Michael Baldwin of Sueba stated that originally, the buyers of houses in Parkway Village were retirees. The original plan called for 464 lots. From February to October 1993, the first 43 houses in the development were sold.

Ralph Bivins of the Houston Chronicle wrote that this subdivision "was key to Sueba's winning the Developer of the Year award from the Greater Houston Builders Association." By 2002 the building of houses was almost complete. In 2002 Bivins stated that Lakes of Parkway was "one of the largest communities to be developed inside city limits in recent years." Development of houses in the subdivision ended in 2003.

== Cityscape ==
In 1993 Michael W. Baldwin, the sales manager, stated that the housing prices will have the range $200,000 ($440,000 with inflation) to $800,000 ($1,740,000 with inflation).

== Government and infrastructure ==
Harris Health System (formerly Harris County Hospital District) designated Valbona Health Center (formerly People's Health Center) in Greater Sharpstown for ZIP code 77077. The nearest public hospital is Ben Taub General Hospital in the Texas Medical Center.

== Education ==
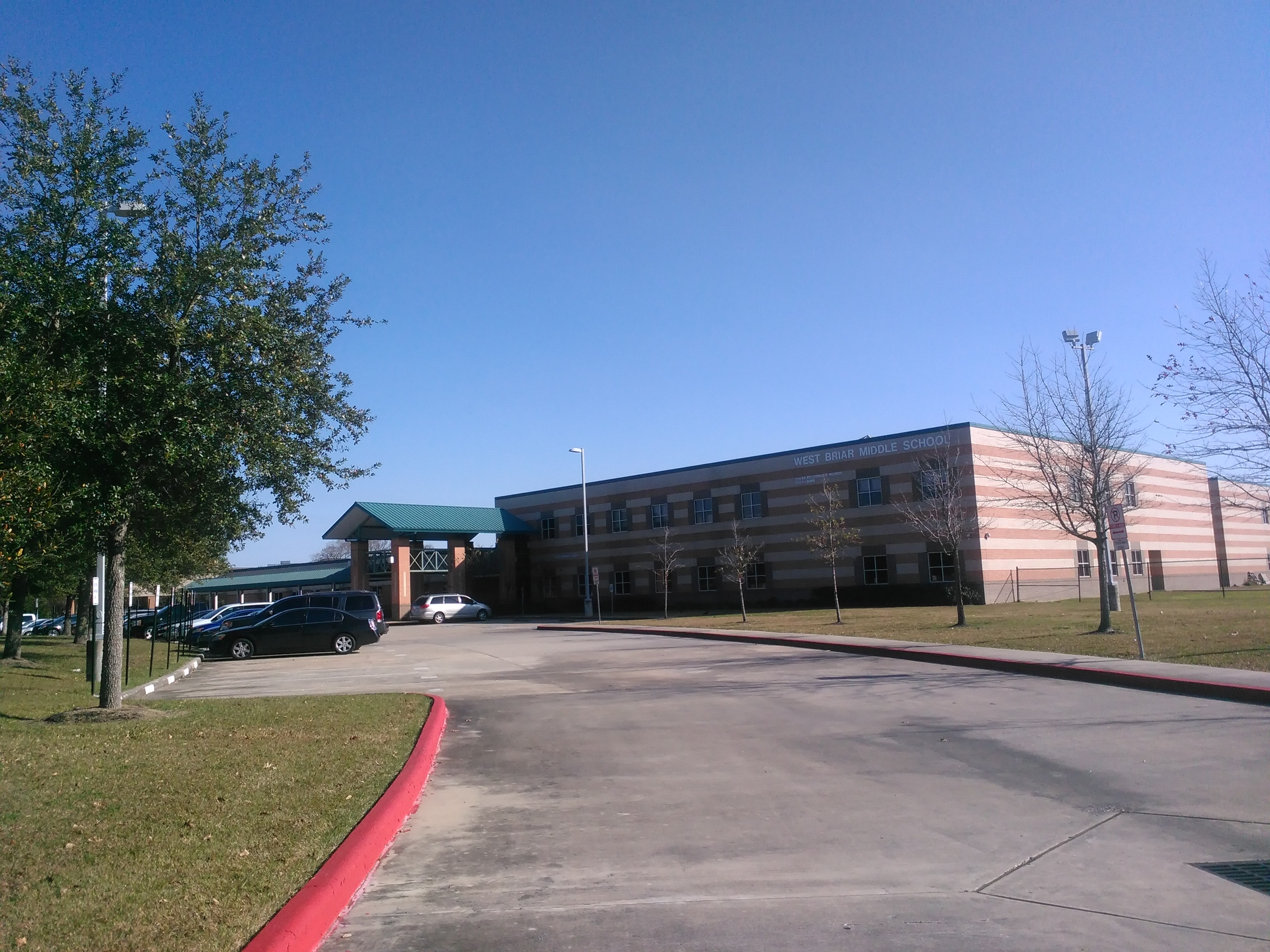
West Briar Middle School

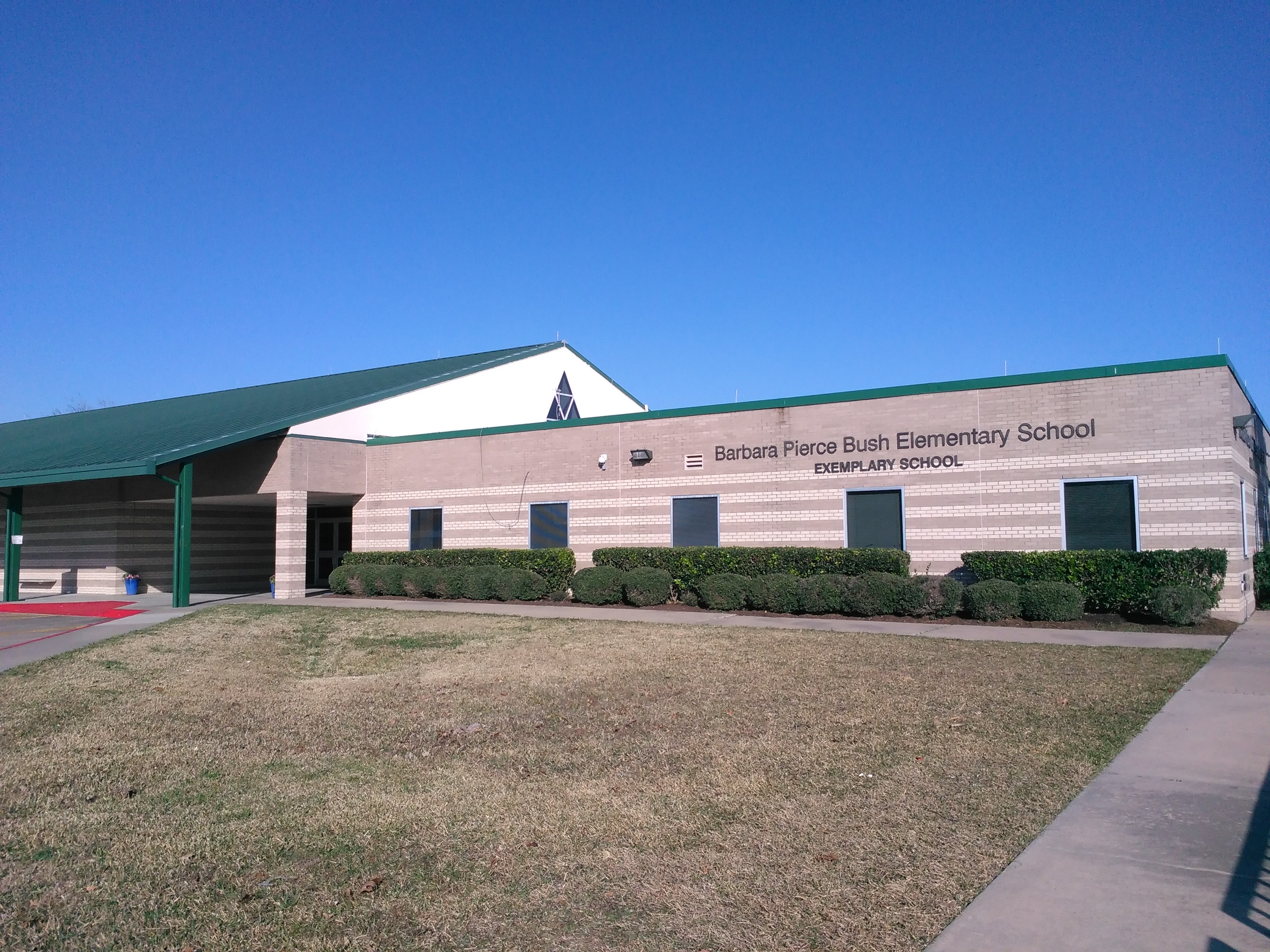
Barbara Bush Elementary School

The community is located in the Houston Independent School District (HISD). Two schools, Barbara Bush Elementary School and West Briar Middle School, are located in the community. Residents are zoned to Bush, West Briar, and Westside High School. Residents zoned to Ashford, Askew, Bush, and Daily may attend Shadowbriar Elementary School's magnet program. At one time residents zoned to Westside were allowed to automatically transfer to Lamar High School.

In 2003 Baldwin stated that the typical buyer in Parkway Villages is a family attracted to the area schools.

Bush opened in 1992. Westside opened in August 2000. West Briar, a name combining those of Westheimer Road and Briar Forest, opened in 2002. Previously residents were zoned to Revere Middle School, and Lee High School (formerly Margaret Long Wisdom High School).
