= Las Américas Newcomer School =

Middle school in Houston, Texas

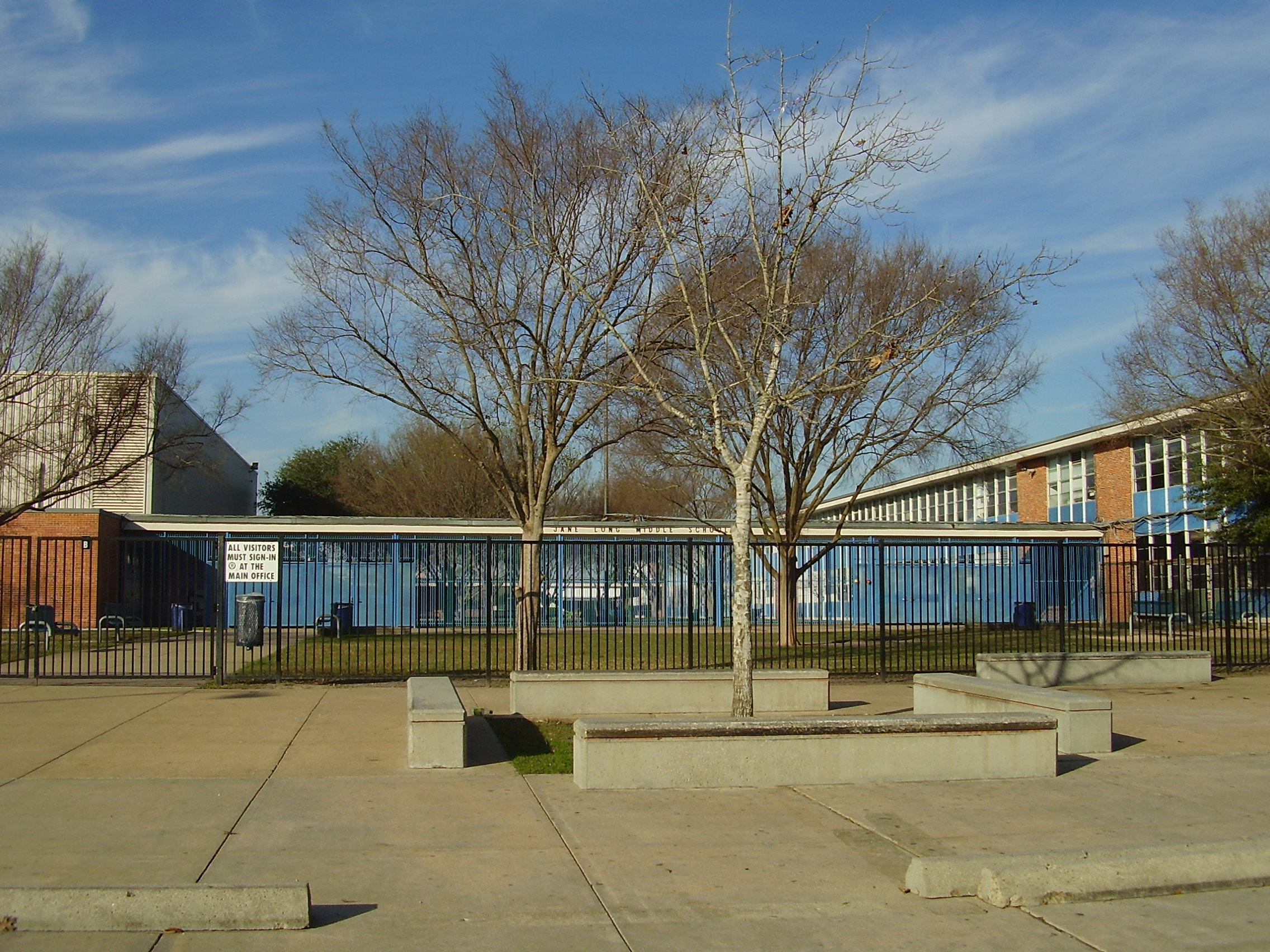
Las Américas Newcomer School is on the campus of Jane Long Middle School, pictured here

Las Américas Newcomer School, also Las Américas Middle School, is an alternative middle school in Sharpstown, Houston, Texas. It is a part of the Houston Independent School District. The school serves grades 6-8 and is on the site of Jane Long Academy.

Las Américas serves newly arrived refugees and other immigrants, aiming to adjust them to the American lifestyle and educational system. Many students reside in the Gulfton area, and other schools and refugee agencies refer students to Las Américas. As of 2015 the principal is Marie Moreno; she worked as the school's principal since 2005.

Las Américas has hosted school administrators inside and outside the United States who also work with refugee populations. Patrick Michels, a staff writer for the Texas Observer, wrote in Politico that the school "has become a model for the holistic education a large newcomer population requires, challenges cities all over the country are facing", and that Las Américas is the school that most "embodies" "That Houston is where so much of the world makes its American arrival is the city’s great challenge and its great opportunity."

== History ==
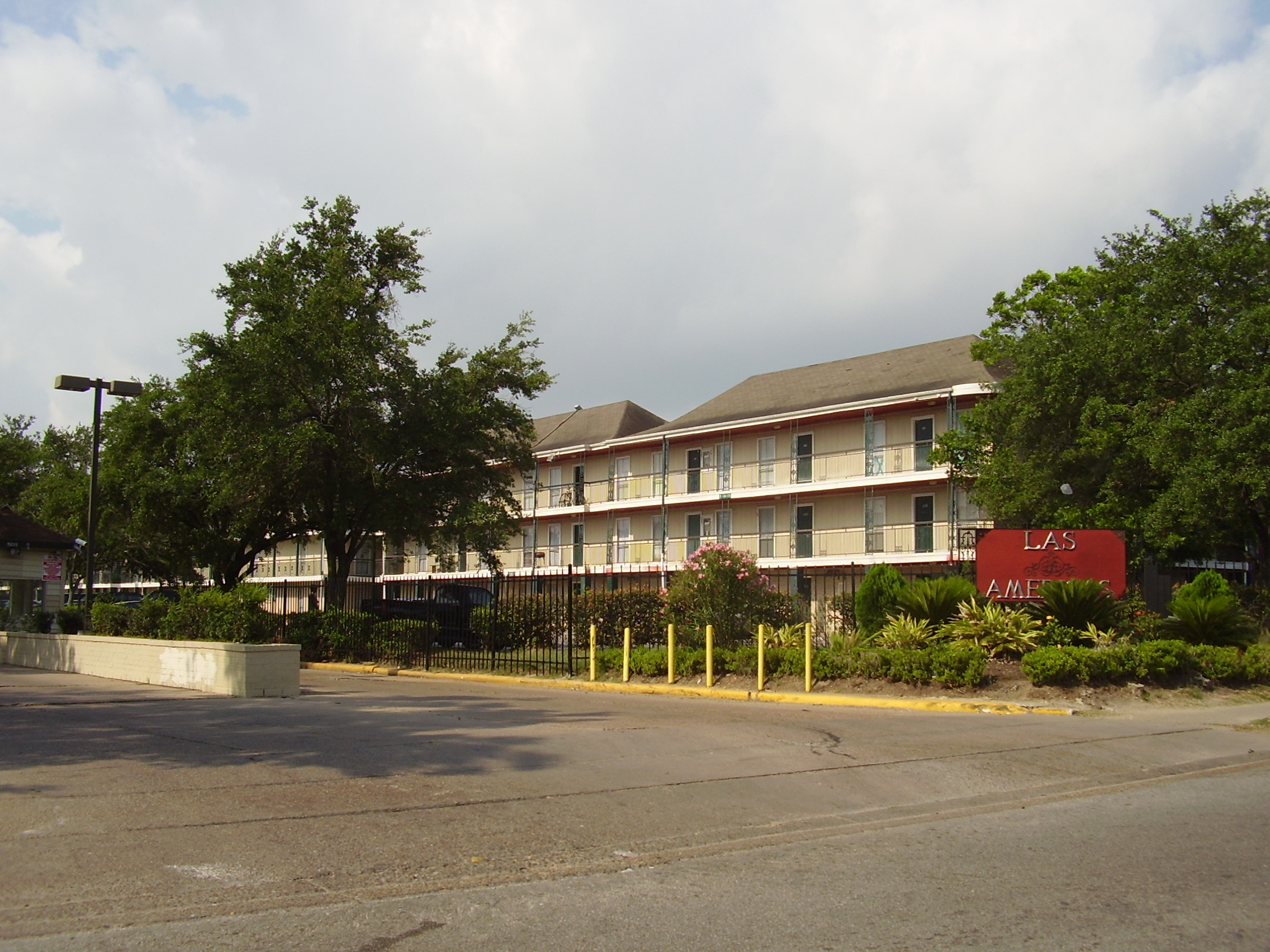
Las Américas Apartments, the former home of the Las Américas Education Center

Las Américas Middle School was originally one of the schools of the Las Américas Education Center in Gulfton, which also included a preschool named Las Américas Early Childhood Development Center and Kaleidoscope Middle School. The education center started in 1995 as a reliever campus for Cunningham and Benavidez elementary schools in Gulfton. The reliever school was established with funds from the "Weed and Seed" program established by City of Houston officials. In 2000, the center moved into the Las Américas Apartments in Gulfton.

In October 2006, Michael Marquez, president of the Hispanic Housing and Education Corporation, which operated the Las Américas apartments, announced to HISD in a letter that the organization would terminate the lease agreement between HISD and the apartment complex because of issues related to maintenance and management, affecting the HISD schools housed there. The district decided to vacate the property instead of appealing the decision. In summer 2007, the former Las Américas Education Center closed. The middle schools that were in the complex, Las Américas Middle School and Kaleidoscope Middle School, moved to the Long Middle School campus.

== Campus ==
Las Américas, residing on the campus of Jane Long Academy (formerly Jane Long Middle School), uses a series of temporary buildings, and will do so until it gets a permanent campus. It has been on the Long campus since 2007.

== Demographics ==
As of the 2010s the school normally has around 108 students. In the 2014-2015 school year Las Américas Newcomer had 325 students, three times the normal enrollment, because 4,000 children who had fled El Salvador, Guatemala, and Honduras settled in the Houston area in the summer of 2014.

As of 2015 countries of origins of the students included: Afghanistan, Azerbaijan, Bhutan, Burma (Myanmar), Burundi, Colombia, Chile, China, Cameroon, Congo, Cuba, El Salvador, Equatorial Guinea, Eritrea, Ethiopia, Guatemala, Honduras, Iran, Iraq, India, Kenya, Liberia, Mexico, Mozambique, Nepal, Nicaragua, Pakistan, Somalia, South Africa, Sudan (including the Darfur region), Tanzania, Turkey, Uganda, Venezuela, Vietnam, and Zambia.

As of 2015 students who have been enrolled in the school have spoken the following languages natively: Amharic, Arabic, Burmese, Cantonese, Dzongkha, French, Fur, Hindi, Kanuri, Karen, Kibembe, Kʼicheʼ (Quiché), Kinyarwanda, Kirundi, Kunama, Lingala, Luganda, Mandarin Chinese, Mandinka (Mandingo), Nepali, Oromo, Persian, Punjabi, Russian, Somali, Spanish (Castellano), Swahili, Tigrinya, Urdu, and Vietnamese.

== Academic performance ==
In the Texas state performance index of early 2014 the school had a six out of 100; a 30 would be a passing score.
