= Rebranding =

Marketing strategy

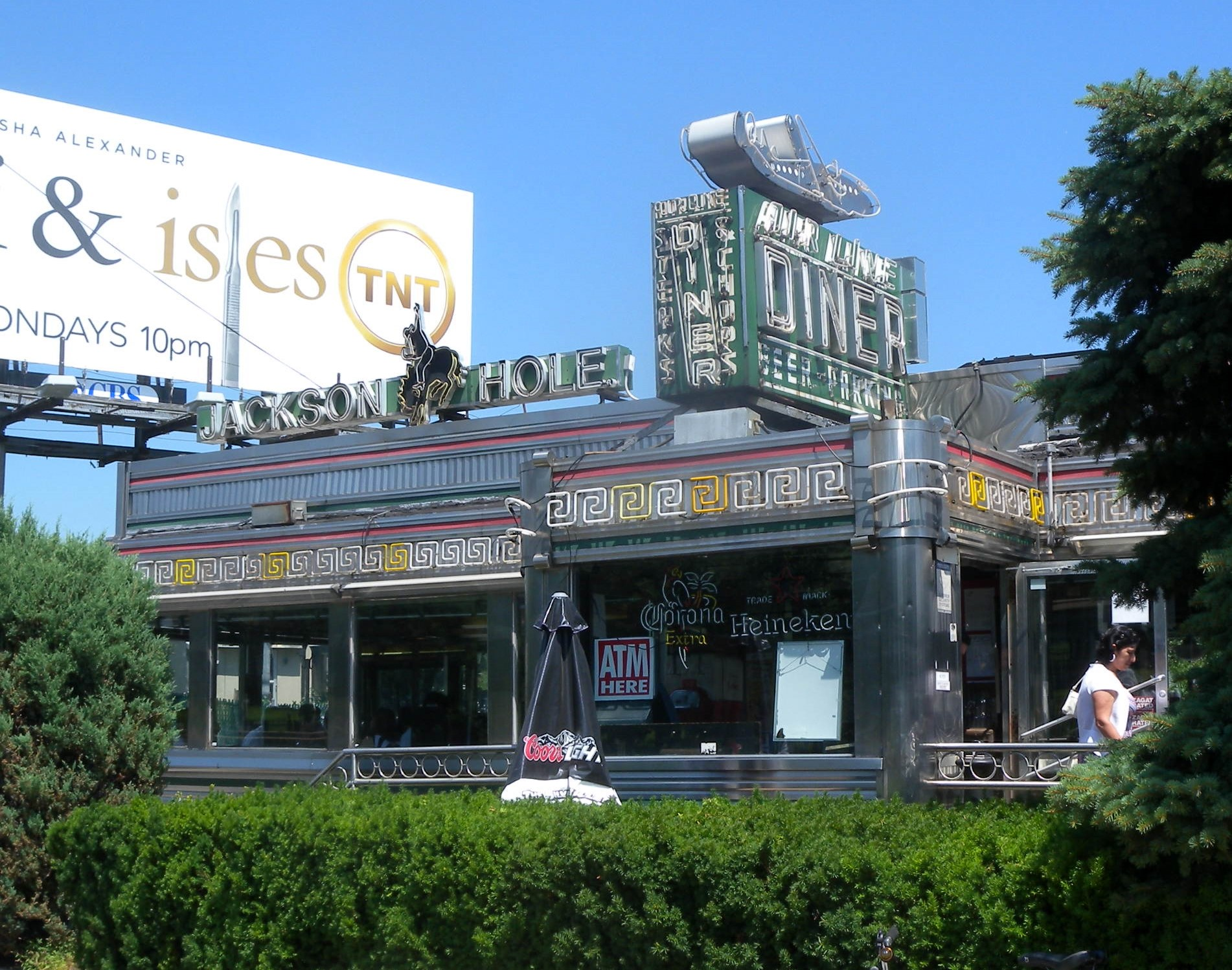
Air Line Diner on Astoria Boulevard, Queens, New York City, partially rebranded as Jackson Hole Diner

Rebranding is a marketing strategy (often called relabeling) in which a new name, term, symbol, design, concept or combination thereof is created for an established brand with the intention of developing a new, differentiated identity in the minds of consumers, investors, competitors, and other stakeholders. Often, this involves radical changes to a brand's logo, name, legal names, image, marketing strategy, and advertising themes. Such changes typically aim to reposition the brand/company, occasionally to distance itself from negative connotations of the previous branding, or to move the brand upmarket; they may also communicate a new message a new board of directors wishes to communicate.

Rebranding can be applied to new products, mature products, or even products still in development. The process can occur through a change in marketing strategy or in various other situations such as Chapter 11 corporate restructuring, union busting, or bankruptcy. Rebranding can also refer to a change in a company or corporate brand that may own several sub-brands for products or companies.

== Corporations ==
Rebranding became something of a fad at the turn of the millennium, with some companies rebranding several times. The rebranding of Philip Morris to Altria was done to help the company shed its negative image. Other rebrandings, such as the British Post Office's attempt to rebrand itself as Consignia, have proved such a failure that millions more had to be spent going back to square one.

In a study of 165 cases of rebranding, Muzellec and Lambkin (2006) found that, whether a rebranding follows from corporate strategy (e.g., mergers & acquisitions) or constitutes the actual marketing strategy (change the corporate reputation), it aims at enhancing, regaining, transferring, and/or recreating the corporate brand equity.

According to Sinclair (1999:13), businesses all over the world acknowledge the value of brands. Brands, alongside ownership of copyright and trademarks, computer software and specialist know-how, are now at the heart of what investors value in a company. Companies in the 21st century may find it necessary to relook their brand in terms of its relevance to consumers and the changing marketplace. Successful rebranding projects can yield a brand better off than before. Marketing develops the awareness and associations in the memory of customers so they know (and are reminded) of brands to serve their needs. Once in a lead position, it is marketing, consistent product or service quality, sensible pricing and effective distribution that will keep the brand ahead of the pack and provide value to its owners (Sinclair, 1999:15).

=== Motivation ===
Corporations often rebrand in order to respond to external and/or internal issues. Firms commonly have rebranding cycles in order to stay current with the times or set themselves ahead of the competition. Companies also utilize rebranding as an effective marketing tool to hide malpractices of the past, thereby shedding negative connotations that could potentially affect profitability.

Corporations such as Citigroup, AOL, American Express, and Goldman Sachs all utilize third-party vendors that specialize in brand strategy and the development of corporate identity. Companies invest valuable resources into rebranding and third-party vendors because it is a way to protect them from being blackballed by customers in a very competitive market. Dr. Roger Sinclair, a leading expert on brand valuation and brand equity practice worldwide stated, “A brand is a resource acquired by an enterprise that generates future economic benefits.” Once a brand has negative connotations associated with it, it can only lead to decreased profitability and possibly complete corporate failure.

==== Differentiation from competitors ====
Companies differentiate themselves from competitors by incorporating practices from changing their logo to going green. Differentiation from competitors is important in order to attract more customers and an effective way to draw in more desirable employees. The need to differentiate is especially prevalent in saturated markets such as the financial services industry.

==== Elimination of a negative image ====
Organisations may rebrand intentionally to shed negative images of the past. Research suggests that "concern over external perceptions of the organisation and its activities" can function as a major driver in rebranding exercises.

In a corporate context, managers can utilize rebranding as an effective marketing strategy to hide malpractices and avoid or shed negative connotations and decreased profitability. Corporations such as Philip Morris USA, Blackwater and AIG rebranded in order to shed negative images. Philip Morris USA rebranded its name and logo to Altria on January 27, 2003 due to the negative connotations associated with tobacco products that could have had potential to affect the profitability of other Philip Morris brands such as Kraft Foods.

In 2008, AIG's image became damaged due to its need for a Federal bailout during the 2008 financial crisis. AIG was bailed out because the United States Treasury stated that AIG was too big to fail due to its size and complex relationships with financial counterparties. AIG itself is a huge international firm; however, the AIG Retirement and AIG Financial subsidiaries were left with negative connotations due to the bailout. As a result, AIG Financial Advisors and AIG Retirement respectively rebranded into Sagepoint Financial and VALIC (Variable Annuity Life Insurance Company) to shed the negative image associated with AIG.

==== Lost market share ====
Brands often rebrand in reaction to losing market share. In these cases, the brands have become less meaningful to target audiences and, therefore, lost share to competitors.

In some cases, companies try to build on any perceived equity they believe still exists in their brand. Radio Shack, for example, rebranded itself as "the Shack" in 2008 but the rebranding never realized into an increase of market share in the retail industry. By 2017, Radio Shack had significantly reduced its physical retail presence, closing over 1,000 stores and shifted to a primarily online retail business model.

==== Emergent situations ====
Rebranding may also occur unintentionally from emergent situations such as “Chapter 11 corporate restructuring,” or “bankruptcy.” Chapter 11 is rehabilitation or reorganization used primarily by business debtors. It’s more commonly known as corporate bankruptcy, which is a form of corporate financial reorganization that allows companies to function while they pay off their debt. Companies such as Lehman Brothers Holdings Inc, Washington Mutual and General Motors have all filed for Chapter 11 bankruptcy.

On July 1, 2009 General Motors filed for bankruptcy, which was fulfilled on July 10, 2009. General Motors decided to rebrand its entire structure by investing more in Chevrolet, Buick, GMC, and Cadillac automobiles. Furthermore, it decided to sell Saab Automobile and discontinue the Hummer, Pontiac, and Saturn brands. General Motors rebranded by stating they are reinventing and rebirthing the company as “The New GM” with “Fewer, stronger brands. Fewer, stronger models. Greater efficiencies, better fuel economy, and new technologies” as stated in their reinvention commercial. General Motors' reinvention commercial also stated that eliminating brands “isn’t about going out of business, but getting down to business.”

==== Product line ====
Companies like Dunkin' Donuts, Joann Fabrics, and Weight Watchers, have removed or abbreviated parts of their company names to suggest a larger product line offering than what their names solely imply. It is also used to cater to different demographics who may be interested in different products of the same industry. In a 2018 marketing stunt, pancake restaurant chain IHOP announced a rebranding to "IHOb" to promote a line of hamburgers, but did not follow through with the rebranding.

==== Staying relevant ====
Companies can also choose to rebrand to remain relevant to its (new) customers and stakeholders. This could occur when a company's business has changed, for example its strategic direction and industry focus, or its brand no longer fits its (new) customer base. For example, a company might rebrand so that its name works in new market it enters, for reasons of culture or language, such as to make it easier to pronounce.

Rebranding may also serve to update a brand's image to maintain relevance among current customers and stakeholders, as visual and conceptual associations that were considered current at one time may lose their resonance over time.

== Products ==
2020: King Arthur Flour rebrands as King Arthur Baking

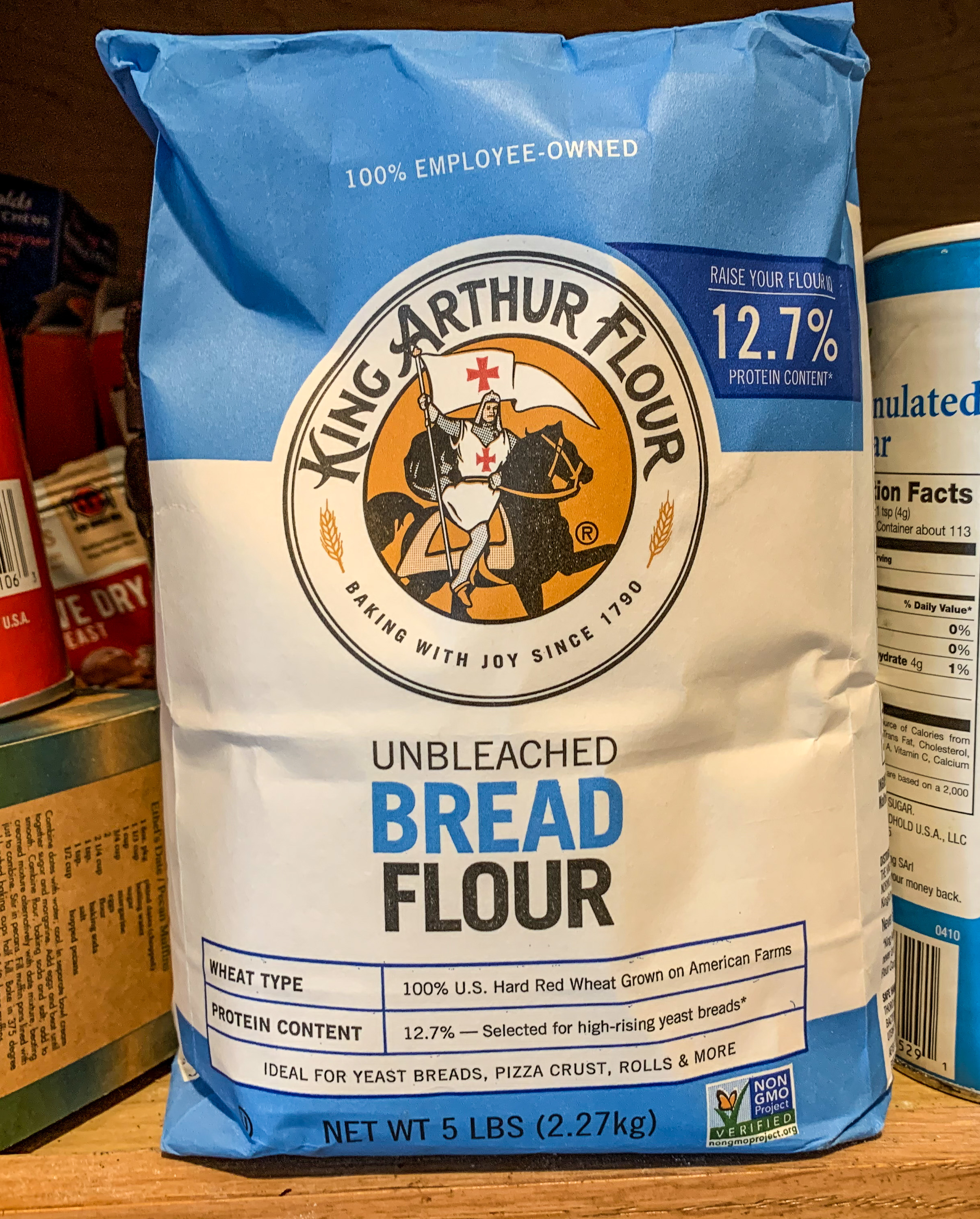
Bread flour packaging before rebranding, featuring a Crusader-esque knight

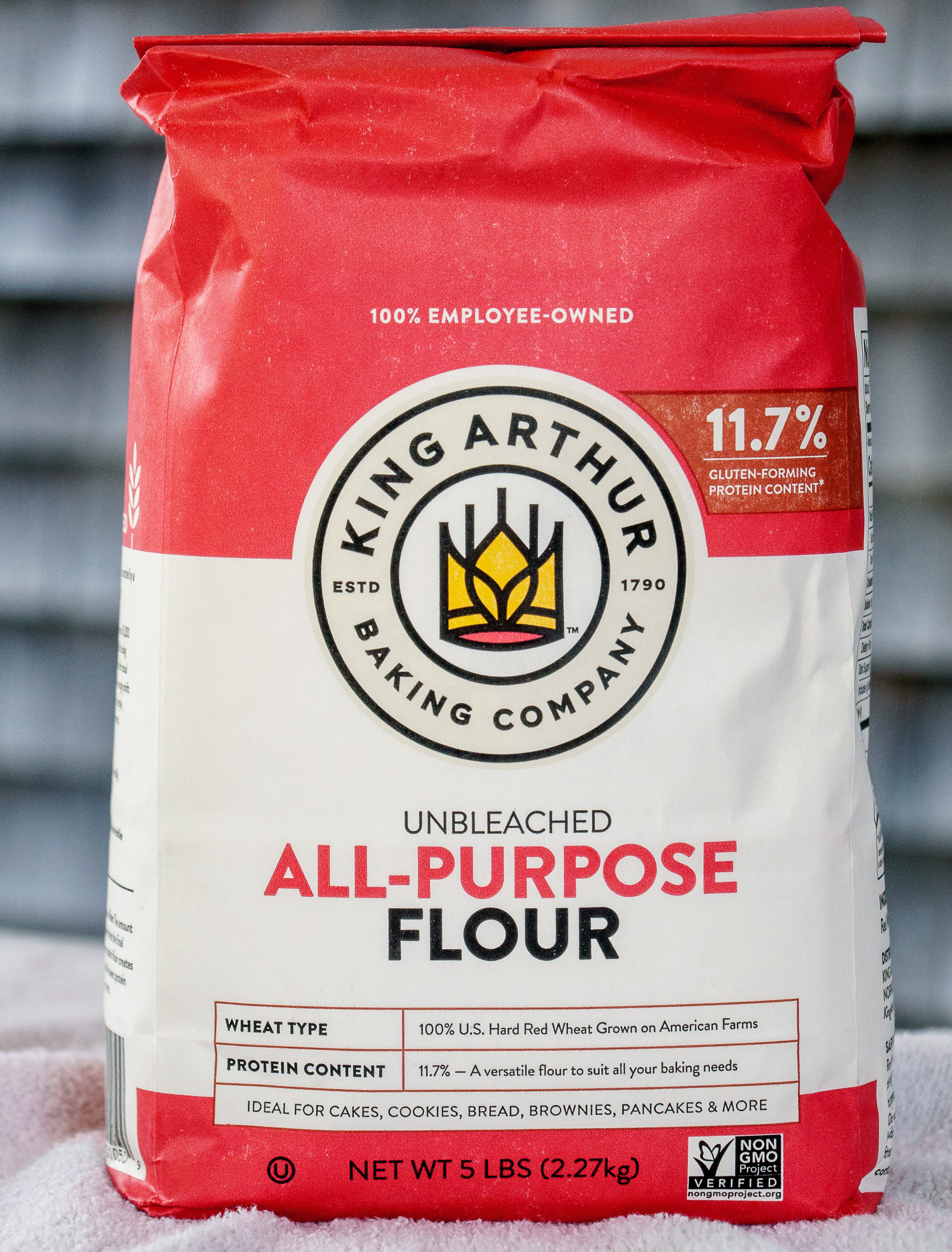
All-purpose flour after rebranding; the knight (and Crosses even on crown) disappears.

As for product offerings, when they are marketed separately to several target markets this is called market segmentation. When part of a market segmentation strategy involves offering significantly different products in each market, this is called product differentiation. This market segmentation/product differentiation process can be thought of as a form of rebranding. What distinguishes it from other forms of rebranding is that the process does not entail the elimination of the original brand image. Rebranding in this manner allows one set of engineering and QA to be used to create multiple products with minimal modifications and additional expense. Another form of product rebranding is the sale of a product manufactured by another company under a new name: an original design manufacturer is a company that manufactures a product, often in a location with lower operating costs, which is eventually branded by another firm for sale.

Following a merger or acquisition, companies usually rebrand newly-acquired products to keep them consistent with an existing product line, such as Symantec placing acquired security and utility software under its Norton brand (itself an offshoot of flagship product Norton Antivirus). This can also happen in reverse if an acquired brand has wider recognition in the market than that of the purchaser, such as Chemical Bank taking on the Chase branding after its merger with the company.

== Hospitality and tourism ==
In the hospitality and tourism sector, rebranding is applied to hotels, resorts, restaurants and tourism destinations, including cities and regions that market themselves to visitors. It is distinctive in this field because brands are closely tied to lived experiences of service and place, and are shaped by multiple stakeholder groups such as owners, operators, public authorities and residents. As a result, rebranding typically involves changes to service design, facilities and the guest or visitor experience, as well as to names, symbols and marketing communications.

Individual hotels may rebrand to reposition in a different market segment, to reflect major renovation or rescaling, or following changes in ownership, management or brand affiliation, such as joining or leaving a hotel chain. Empirical studies report that such initiatives can be associated with changes in occupancy, average daily rate (ADR) and revenue per available room (RevPAR), although outcomes vary by context and by how well the new brand matches the asset and its competitive environment.

Tourism destinations also undertake rebranding in order to update their image, reach new source markets or communicate sustainability and quality-of-life objectives. Research on residents’ engagement with place branding suggests that local communities can support, reinterpret or resist a new destination brand, and that their involvement is important for the long-term credibility of such initiatives.

== Small businesses ==
Small businesses face different challenges from large corporations and must adapt their rebranding strategy accordingly. Rather than implementing change gradually, small businesses are sometimes better served by rebranding their image in a short timeframe – especially when existing brand notoriety is low. “The powerful first impression on new clients made possible by professional brand design often outweighs an outdated or poorly-designed image’s weak brand recognition to existing clients”. A change of image in a large corporation can have costly repercussions (updating signage in multiple locations, large quantities of existing collateral, communicating with a large number of employees, etc.), while small businesses can enjoy more mobility and implement change more quickly. While small businesses can experience growth without necessarily having a professionally designed brand image, "rebranding becomes a critical step for a company to be considered seriously when expanding to more aggressive markets and facing competitors with more established brand images".

== Impact ==
The ubiquitous nature of a company/product brand across all customer touchpoints makes rebranding a heavy undertaking for companies. According to the iceberg model, 80% of the impact is hidden. The level of impact of changing a brand depends on the degree to which the brand is changed.

There are several elements of a brand that can be changed in a rebranding these include the name, the logo, the legal name, and the corporate identity (including visual identity and verbal identity). Changes made only to the company logo have the lowest impact (called a logo-swap), and changes made to the name, legal name, and other identity elements will touch every part of the company and can result in high costs and impact on large complex organizations.

Rebranding affects not only marketing material but also digital channels, URLs, signage, clothing, and correspondence.

== See also ==
- Original design manufacturer (ODM)
- Original equipment manufacturer (OEM)
- Electronics manufacturing services (EMS)
- Ayds
- Brand implementation
- Product naming
- List of companies involved in the Holocaust
- List of politically motivated renamings
