= San Felipe Plaza =

Skyscraper in Houston, Texas

Coordinates: 29.7495°N 95.4819°W

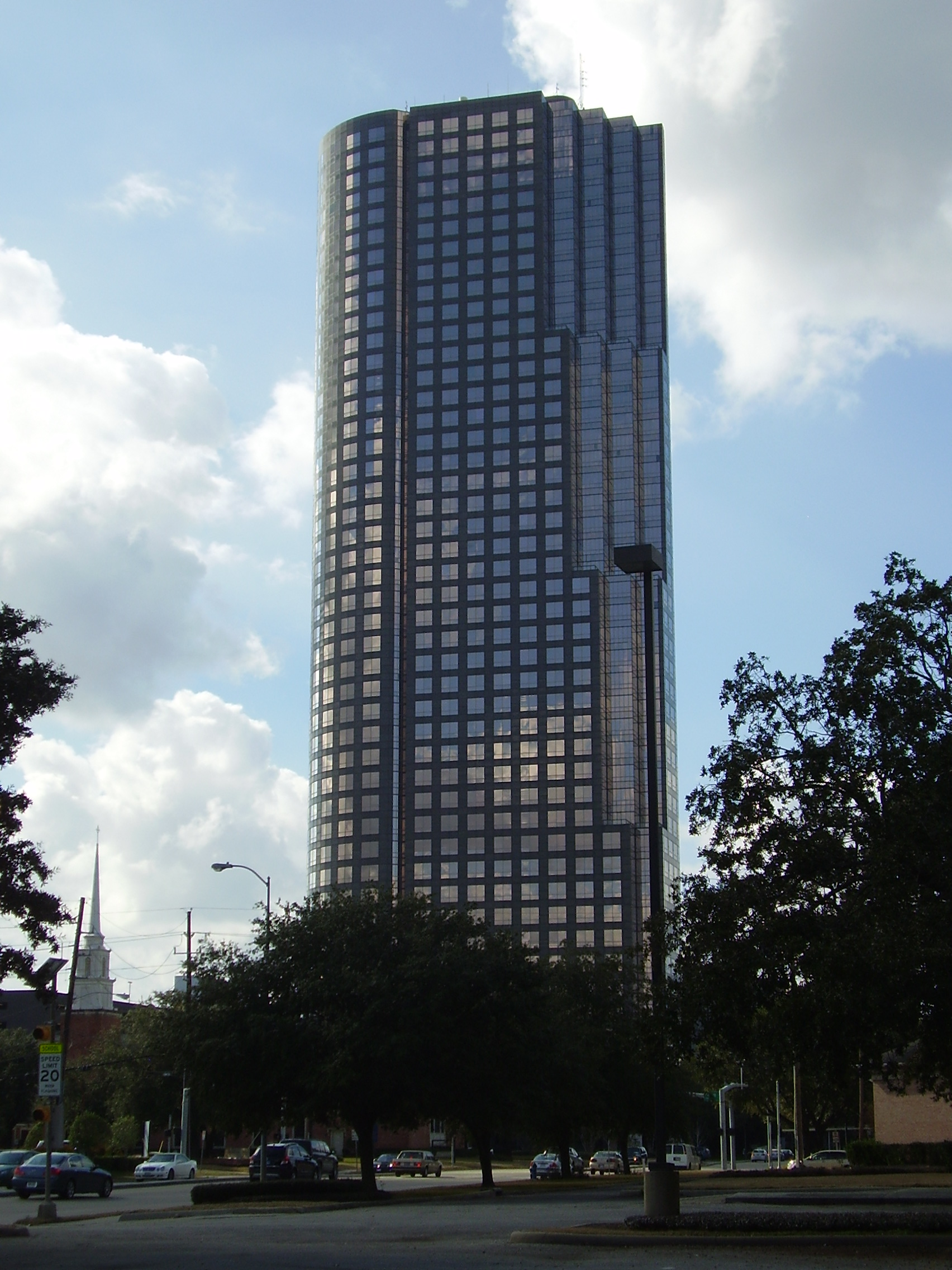

General information
- Status: Completed
- Architectural style: Modernism
- Location: 5847 San Felipe Street, Houston, TX 77057
- Construction started: 1982; 44 years ago
- Completed: 1984; 42 years ago
- Owner: Sovereign Partners

Height
- Height: 625 ft (191 m)

Technical details
- Structural system: Curtain wall
- Floor count: 45
- Floor area: 959,466 sq ft (89,137.3 m^{2})
- Lifts/elevators: 32

Design and construction
- Architect: Skidmore, Owings & Merrill

San Felipe Plaza is a 46-story tower west of the Uptown Houston district in Houston, Texas, United States. Designed by architect Richard Keating, the building was constructed in 1984 by Linbeck Construction Corporation and contains 959,466 square feet (89,137.3 m^{2}) of leaseable space. The building is the 16th tallest in the city and is the second-tallest building outside of Downtown Houston. It is 2 miles from the Houston Galleria.

== History ==
The building was completed in 1984.

In 1993, Sanchez-O'Brien Oil & Gas leased an additional 21,828 square feet (2,027.9 m^{2}) of space in the building. During that year other tenants included BHP Petroleum (the U.S. subsidiary of BHP), Maxxam, and Texas Commerce Bank-Tanglewood. The building had served as the U.S. headquarters of BHP. Later in 1993, BHP announced that it was moving its U.S. headquarters, including 200 clerical and professional employees, from San Felipe Plaza to the Cigna Tower in Four Oaks Place. The Consulate of Canada in Houston opened in the building in 2003.

In 2014, AkinMears leased the entire 45th floor of the building.

In 2016, Deutser signed a lease in the building.

In 2018, Encino Energy signed a lease in the building for 76,048 square feet.

== Tenants ==
- Avelo Airlines (Suite 1900) (Corporate headquarters)
- Deutser
- Encino Energy
- AkinMears (Suite 4500)
- Canadian Trade Commissioner Service Office in Houston (Suite 1700)
- Valaris Limited (Suite 3300)
- Westmont Hospitality Group (Suite 4600/4650)

== See also ==
- Architecture of Houston
- List of tallest buildings in Houston
