= American General Center =

Office complex in Houston, Texas

America Tower
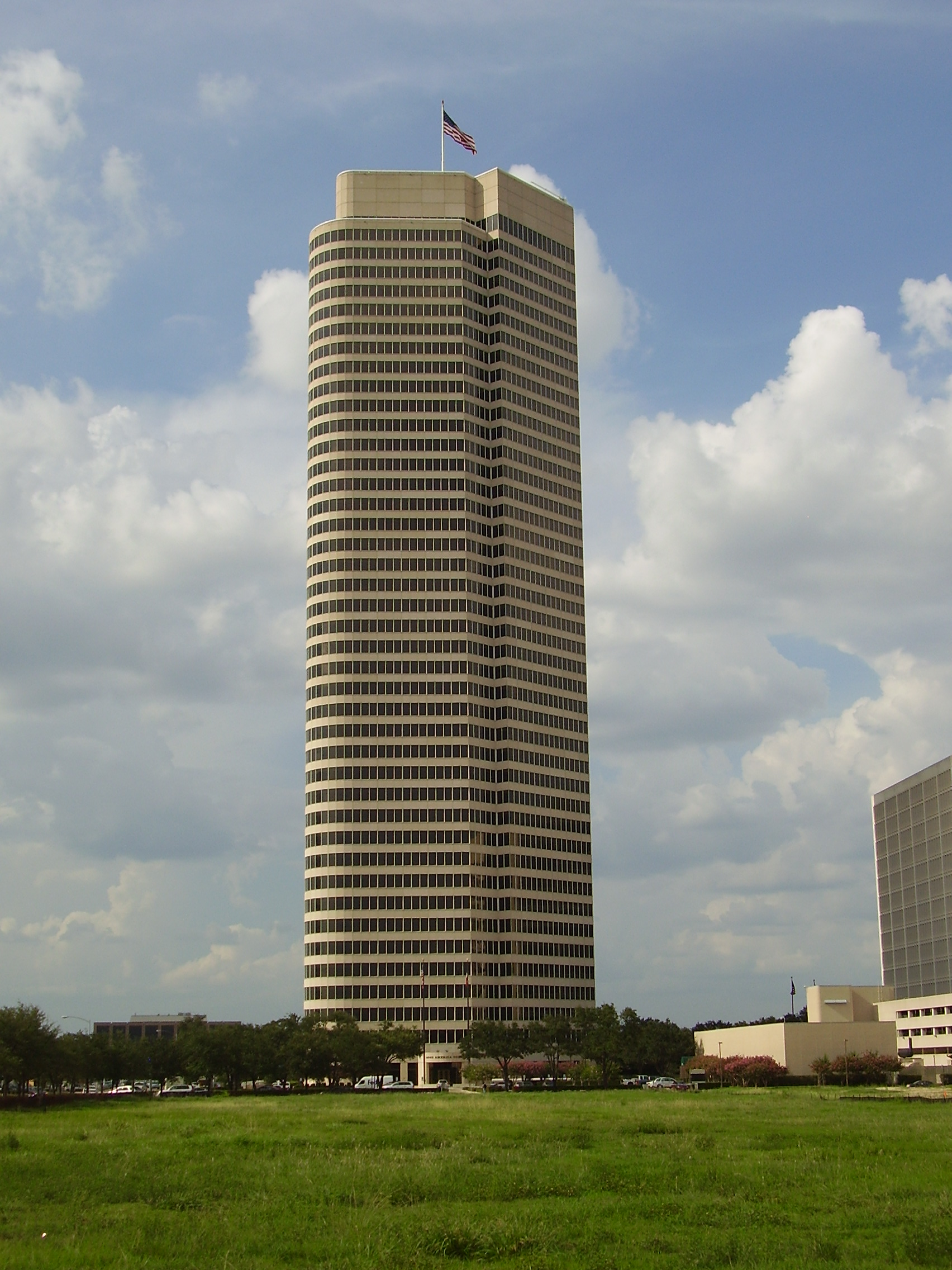
- Interactive map of the America Tower area

General information
- Location: 2929 Allen Parkway, Houston, Texas
- Coordinates: 29°45′39″N 95°23′51″W
- Completed: 1983
- Owner: AIG American General

Height
- Roof: 590 ft (180 m)

Technical details
- Floor count: 43

Design and construction
- Architects: Lloyd Jones Brewer and Associates
- Main contractor: W.S. Bellows Construction Corporation

The American General Center is a complex of several office buildings in Neartown Houston, Texas located along Allen Parkway. The America Tower building of the complex became the global headquarters for Corebridge Financial, formerly American General, in 2024.

The America Tower is a 590 ft (180m) tall skyscraper. It was completed in 1983 and has 43 floors. It is the 21st tallest building in the city. It serves as the headquarters of Baker Hughes. It served as the former headquarters of Continental Airlines; it now houses AIG American General and BDO USA, LLP. The other buildings include the Life Building, the Wortham Tower, the Woodson Tower (a.k.a. the Liberty Tower), and the Riviana Building.

== History ==
On July 1, 1983 Continental Airlines's headquarters were located at the America Tower, and would remain there until relocation to Downtown Houston in 1998 and 1999. Stephen M. Wolf, the president of Continental said that the company moved its headquarters because Houston became the largest hub for Continental. During the existence of Texas Air Corporation in the 1980s, its headquarters were in the America Tower. In September 1997, Continental announced that it would move its headquarters to Continental Center I. Continental had occupied approximately 250,000 square feet (23,000 m^{2}) in space in the America Tower before its lease expired in July 1998.

In 1998 Andersen Consulting, now Accenture, announced that it would consolidate its existing Downtown Houston and suburban workforces into 153,000 square feet (14,200 m^{2}) in the America Tower, with more than 1,100 employees based in the space. Lynn Cook of the Houston Business Journal described this as "an astonishing number for the size of Andersen Consulting's lease." In 1999, realty firm Cushman & Wakefield moved its Houston office into the America Tower from the Wells Fargo Tower of Four Oaks Place in Uptown Houston. As of 1999 the building was 99% leased.

The Corebridge Financial name replaced AIG on the America Tower, where it has its headquarters, in September 2024.

== Tenants ==
American General Life Companies has offices in the America Tower.

American General Life Insurance Company is headquartered in the Life Building.

Ebro Foods North America Riviana & New World Pasta is in the Riviana Building. The Consulate-General of Norway in Houston was in Suite 1185 in the Riviana Building. It has since relocated in another building in Neartown.

== Gallery ==
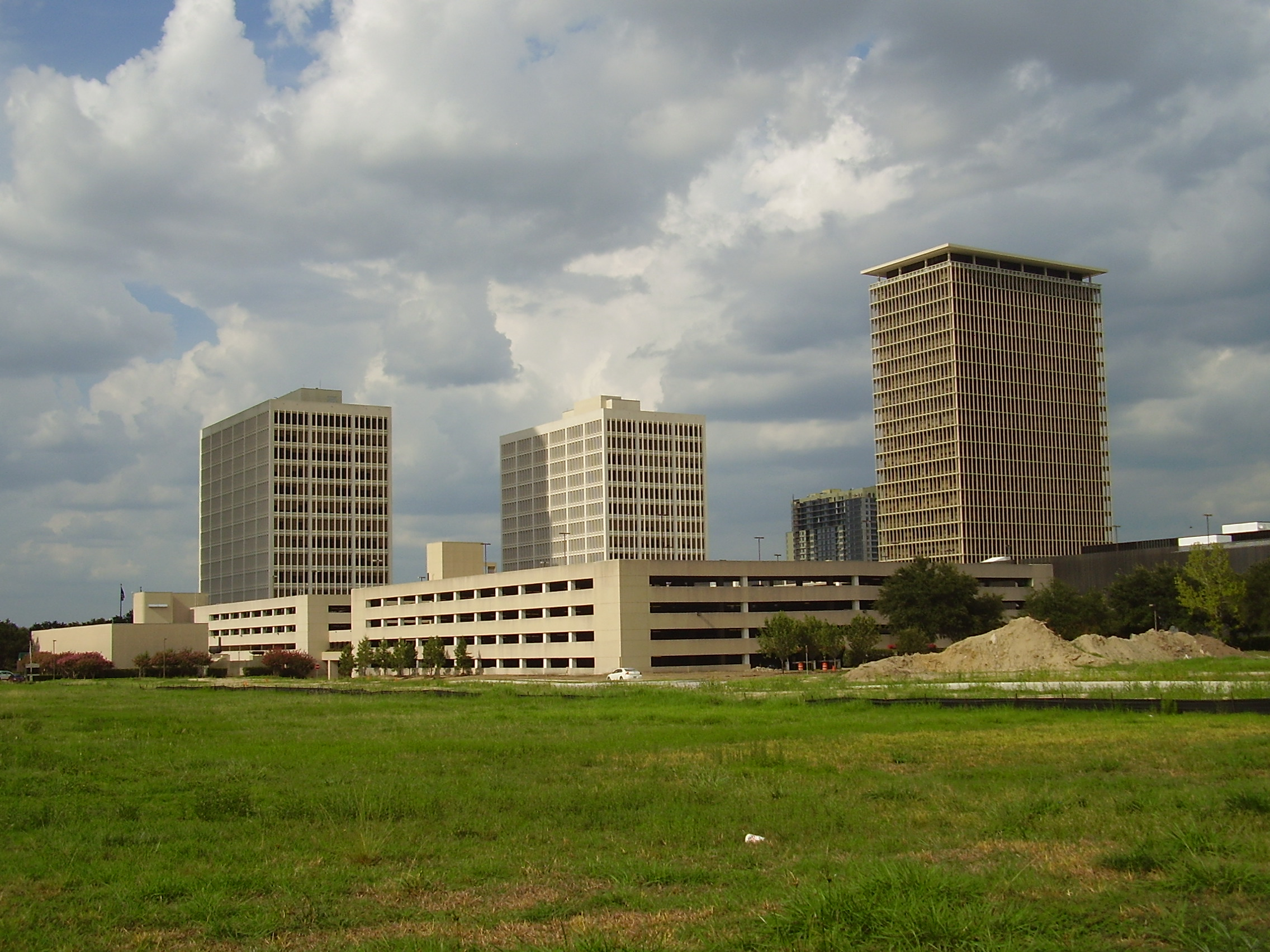
Four of the towers of the American General Center

== See also ==
- List of tallest buildings in Houston
