= Corebridge Financial =

American financial services company

Corebridge Financial, Inc.

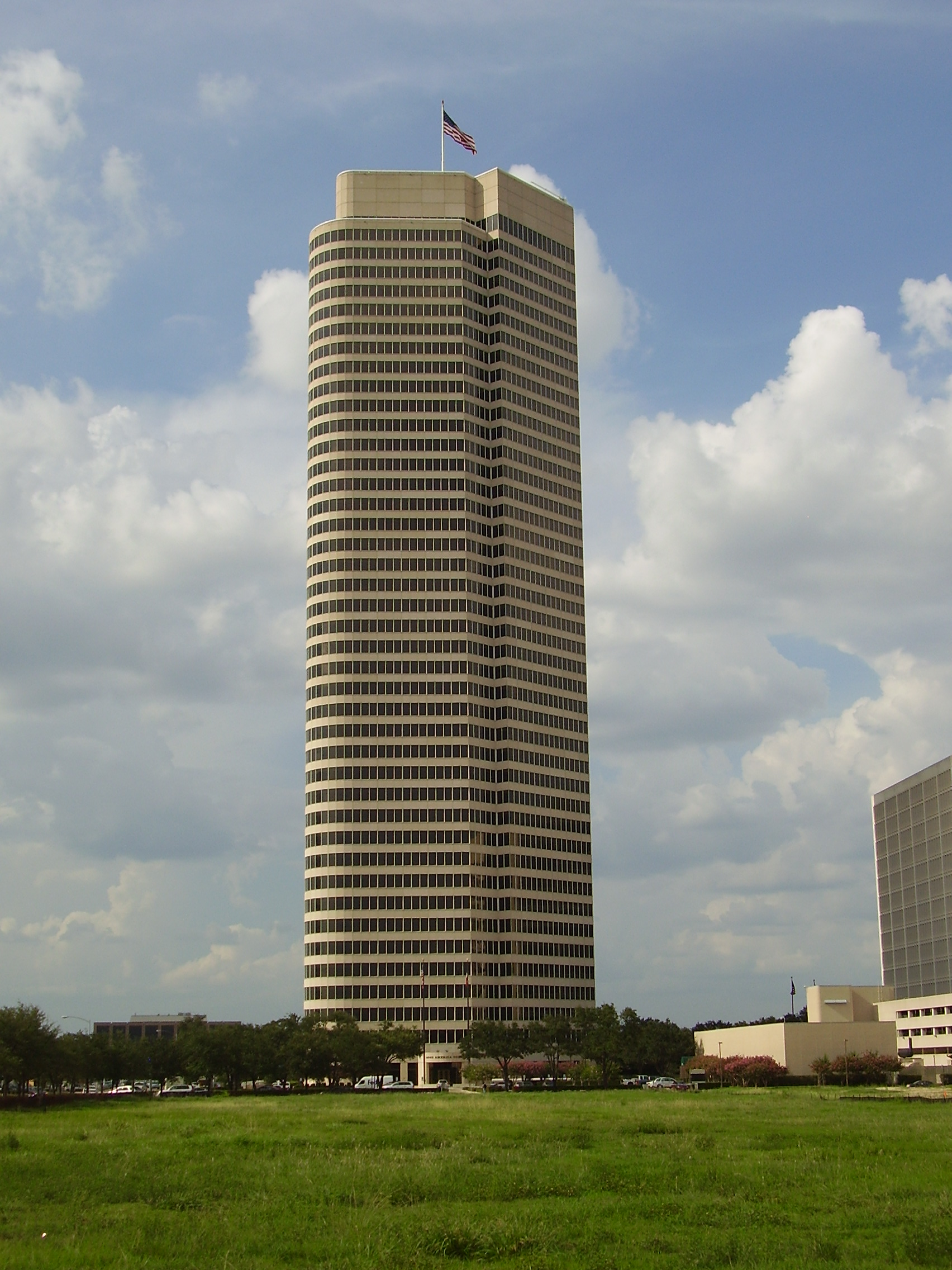
- Corebridge headquarters
- Type: Public
- Traded as: NYSE: CRBG; S&P 400 component
- Industry: Financial services
- Predecessors: American General; AIG Life Insurance
- Founded: March 8, 1926; 100 years ago as American General Corp. September 15, 2022; 3 years ago as Corebridge Financial
- Headquarters: American General Center, Houston, Texas, United States
- Area served: Worldwide
- Key people: Marc Costantini (President and CEO)
- Products: Annuity; Life insurance; Wealth management; Employer retirement plans
- Revenue: US$18.48 billion (2025)
- Operating income: US$2.97 billion (2025)
- Net income: -US$366 million (2025)
- AUM: US$386 billion AUMA (2025)
- Owner: Nippon Life; Blackstone Inc., AIG
- Number of employees: 4,800 (2025)
- Subsidiaries: American General Life Insurance Company; United States Life Insurance Company in the City of New York; Variable Annuity Life Insurance Company; (VALIC)
- Website: corebridgefinancial.com

Corebridge Financial, Inc. is an American financial services company. It provides annuities, life insurance, retirement plans, wealth management, and other financial services through its four core businesses—individual retirement, life insurance, retirement services, and institutional markets.

Corebridge was formed by an AIG spin-off of the company via IPO in 2022. In 2024, Nippon Life Insurance Company acquired an equity interest in Corebridge Financial from AIG. In 2025, the company joined the Fortune 500.

== History ==
Corebridge Financial was formed when AIG spun off the company in September 2022. In September 2024, the Corebridge brand name replaced AIG on the America Tower of the American General Center, its headquarters. In May 2026, AIG agreed to sell its remaining shares in Corebridge Financial, the culmination of a five-year separation process.

=== Early history ===
The American General Insurance Company was formed on May 8, 1926 by Gus Sessions Wortham in Houston, Texas. Wortham worked for the Texas Fire Rating Board in Austin, Texas before moving to Houston in 1912. Before starting American General, he worked at his father's insurance company, John L. Wortham & Son Agency, until his death in 1924. Following his father's death, Wortham began the company in response to a Texas Commissions of Appeal ruling allowing that insurance companies may merge several lines of business.

In 1953, American General hired life insurance veteran Benjamin N. Woodson as president. Woodson previously served at Mutual Trust Life Insurance Company, the National Association of Life Underwriters, and various other roles. Woodson would eventually succeed Wortham as CEO of the company in 1972 where he remained until retiring in 1978.

In 1995, the company was the subject of Unitrin, Inc. v. American General Corp. American General tendered an offer for a controlling block of shares of Unitrin. The Board of Directors of Unitrin, who held 23% of the shares, did not think the price offered was adequate and so initiated a poison pill and offered a buyback to increase their holdings to 28% of the total shares. It became the leading case on a board of directors' ability to use defensive measures, such as poison pills or buybacks, to prevent a hostile takeover.

=== NLT Corporation ===
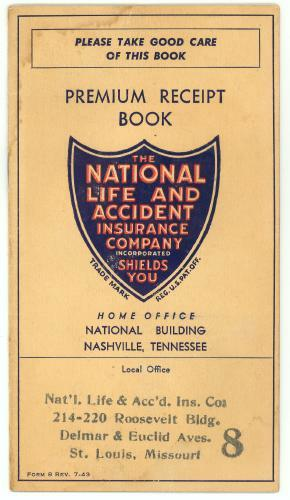

The NLT Corporation was formed in 1900 as the National Sick and Accident Association. The Nashville, Tennessee firm became one of the country's largest life insurance companies. American General (AGC) announced a hostile takeover bid for NLT, which made a counter-offer to buy out AGC. In 1982, AGC, which had owned Nashville rival L&C since the 1960s, prevailed. Having acquired NLT, AGC merged the former rivals over the next decade and spun off the non-core assets of NLT, particularly its entertainment properties. The Grand Ole Opry, Opryland theme park, WSM, and then fledgling cable television network The Nashville Network (TNN) were sold to what became Gaylord Entertainment Company.

=== Acquisitions ===
In 1977, American General acquired The Variable Annuity Life Insurance Company (VALIC), a provider of tax-deferred retirement plans for employees in education, healthcare, government, and non-profit organizations. VALIC companies include VALIC Financial Advisors, Inc. and VALIC Retirement Services Company, which operate as Corebridge Financial subsidiaries within Corebridge Retirement Services.

In 1983, American General acquired Gulf United's insurance operations.

AIG agreed to acquire annuity provider SunAmerica Inc. in 1998, with the $18 billion stock transaction then reported as the second-largest in the history of the insurance industry.

In 2001, it was announced that American General would be acquired by Prudential plc in a deal worth $26.6 billion. The deal was later called off after negative Prudential shareholder reaction. After the deal failed to go through, AIG announced plans to acquire American General for $23 billion in stock. American General would continue to operate under AIG as their life insurance and retirement services subsidiary. In 2003, Old Line Life Insurance merged with American General.

=== IPO and spin-off from AIG ===
Corebridge was formed as a result of a spin-off of AIG's retirement, life insurance, and wealth management segments. In 2020, AIG announced plans to perform the spin-off with a 2022 IPO. In July 2021, the company announced that Blackstone Group would acquire 9.9% of the new unit for $2.2 billion cash. Blackstone and AIG also entered a long-term asset management agreement for about one quarter of AIG's life and retirement portfolio, set to increase in subsequent years. The new company was launched on September 15, 2022, in the largest IPO of 2022 to date, which raised a total of $1.68 billion.

In September 2023, it was announced Corebridge would sell its subsidiary, the London-headquartered life insurance company AIG Life Limited (AIG Life UK) to the British multinational insurance company, Aviva for £460 million. Corebridge sold subsidiary Irish health insurer Laya Healthcare to AXA, for €650 million, on October 31, 2023.

In 2024, Nippon Life Insurance Company acquired an equity interest in Corebridge Financial from AIG. On December 31, 2025, Nippon became the company's largest shareholder, with a 24.6% stake.

In June 2025, Corebridge entered into an agreement with Venerable Holdings subsidiary Corporate Solutions Life Reinsurance Company to reinsure all variable annuities of its individual retirement business, valued at $51 billion as of March 31, 2025. The transaction was valued at $2.8 billion and closed in stages, in August 2025, and in January 2026.

In March 2026, Corebridge Financial announced a merger with Equitable Holdings through an all-stock merger worth $22 billion, which would create a combined company with $1.5 trillion in assets under management and over 12 million clients.

Corebridge was included among the Fortune 500 and the S&P 400 in 2025.

The company was ranked first among annuity providers in the JD Power 2026 Life & Annuity Distribution Partner Experience Study.

== PGA of America ==
The company is the official life insurance and retirement partner of the PGA of America, as originally formed in 2019 under AIG. The Corebridge Financial team is a group of PGA of America golf professionals that qualify to play in the PGA Championship by placing in the Top 20 of the PGA Professional Championship. Michael Block has been a consistent member of this team, including when he famously hit a hole-in-one at the 2023 PGA Championship at Oak Hill.
