= Pride International =

Oil drilling company from Texas, US

Pride International, Inc.
- Industry: Offshore drilling
- Founded: 1966
- Defunct: May 31, 2011
- Fate: Acquired by Ensco (now Valaris Limited)
- Successor: Valaris Limited
- Headquarters: Houston, Texas, United States
- Number of employees: 3,900 (2010)

Pride International, Inc. was an offshore oil drilling company headquartered in Houston, Texas. As of February 2011, it operated 26 drilling rigs. In May 2011, it was acquired by Ensco (now Valaris Limited).

== History ==
The company was founded in 1966 in Alice, Texas as Pride Oilwell Service Company.

In 1978, the company was acquired by Dekalb Corporation.

In August 1988, the company was spun out as a public company.

In 1996, the company acquired Quitral-Co. Saic, the largest drilling contractor in Argentina, for $140 million. It also acquired Forasol-Foramer. It also sold its land based operations.

In 1997, the company acquired 12 rigs from Noble Corporation.

In 2001, the company acquired Marine Drilling.

In 2006, the company put executives on leave due to bribery allegations for rig contracts in Mexico and Venezuela.

In August 2009, the company spun off Seahawk Drilling, which owned 20 jackup rigs.

On May 31, 2011, the company was acquired by Ensco (now Valaris Limited).
