= Lakes on Post Oak =

Commercial complex in Houston, Texas

Coordinates: 29.734°N 95.463°W

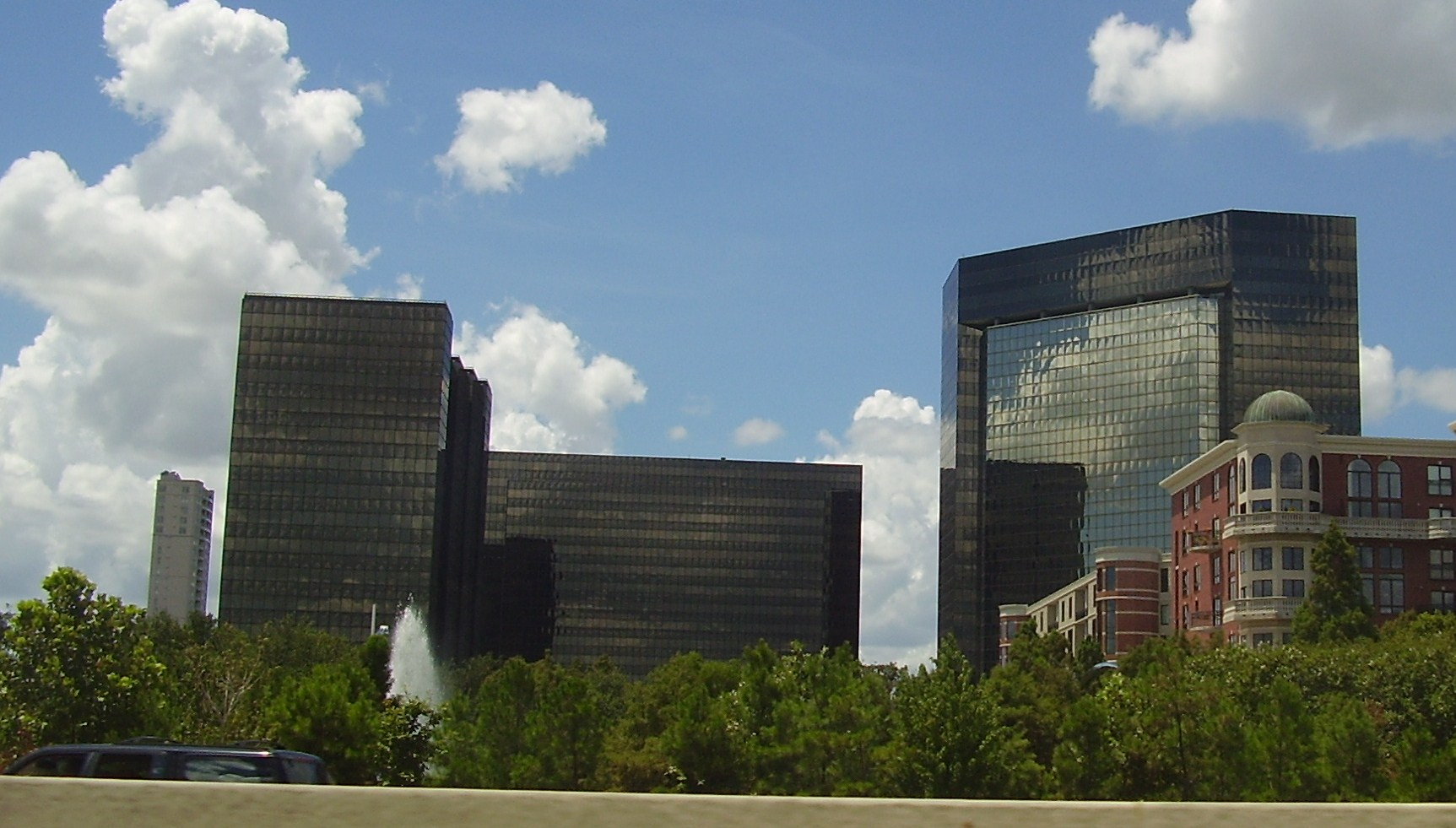
Lakes on Post Oak

Lakes on Post Oak is a commercial complex located in Uptown Houston, Texas, United States.

The complex includes the 19-story 3000 Post Oak Boulevard, the 22-story 3040 Post Oak Boulevard, and the 17-story 3050 Post Oak Boulevard. Each building has a dedicated parking garage. Together the buildings, on a 23-acre (93,000 m^{2}) site, have 1,200,000 square feet (110,000 m^{2}) of Class A office space.

== History ==
Hines Interests Limited Partnership developed Lakes on Post Oak as an integrated office project between 1979 and 1981. The 44,200-square-foot (4,110 m^{2}) 3040 Post Oak Boulevard building opened in 1982. The buildings were originally owned by Hines.

In 1997 Cottonwood Partners, a Dallas-based company, bought a portion of Lakes on Post Oak, consisting of 3000 Post Oak Boulevard and 3050 Post Oak Boulevard In 1997 the combined value of all of the buildings in Lakes of Post Oak were between $138 million to $150 million ($110–120 per square foot). Logan Brown, an office broker of Grubb & Ellis, said that the complex's "unique views of the lake, proximity to the Galleria and the fact that the lakes have become a gathering place during the day and in the evenings" make the complex "the only one in Houston that is widely appealing to office and non-office users."

Before 2002, 3040 Post Oak Boulevard was owned by Nippon Life. In 2002 Koger Equity, Inc. acquired the entire Lakes on Post Oak project for $102 million ($85 per square foot) from Cottonwood and Nippon Life, reunifying the complex. Thomas Crocker, the chief executive officer of Koger Equity, said Its 'suburban in-fill' characteristics combined with the fact that the properties were purchased at a significant discount to replacement cost integrates perfectly with our long-term investment strategy." As of 2002 the Lakes on Post Oak complex was 75% occupied. In 2003 Koger announced that Trammell Crow would manage and lease units in the complex.

In 2010, Thomas Crocker's firm Crocker Partners, now CP Group, reacquired the asset from a distressed buyer. The firm capitalized on the opportunity of re-acquiring the asset at a time of perceived market risk due to a pending 50% anchor tenant lease expiration, which had substantially driven down pricing. CP Group increased occupancy to over 90% due to increased demand from the building and road improvements and sold the buildings again in 2014 at a 2.7x multiple.

== Buildings ==
=== 3000 Post Oak Boulevard ===
3000 Post Oak has about 450,000 square feet (42,000 m^{2}) of space. In 1997 3000 Post Oak Boulevard was 100% occupied and housed Bechtel.

=== 3040 Post Oak Boulevard ===
3040 Post Oak has about 450,000 square feet (42,000 m^{2}) of space. In 1997 3040 Post Oak Boulevard was 95% occupied. The Consulate-General of Angola is in Suite 780. In 2009 Opicoil Houston renewed and expanded its lease at 3040 Post Oak Boulevard.

=== 3050 Post Oak Boulevard ===
3050 Post Oak has about 350,000 square feet (33,000 m^{2}) of space. In 1997 3050 Post Oak Boulevard was 97% occupied. In 2009 Galway Group renewed and expanded its lease in 3050 Post Oak Boulevard. The Consulate-General of Argentina was formerly located in Suite 1625; by 2009 it was located in a different facility in Uptown.

== Gallery ==
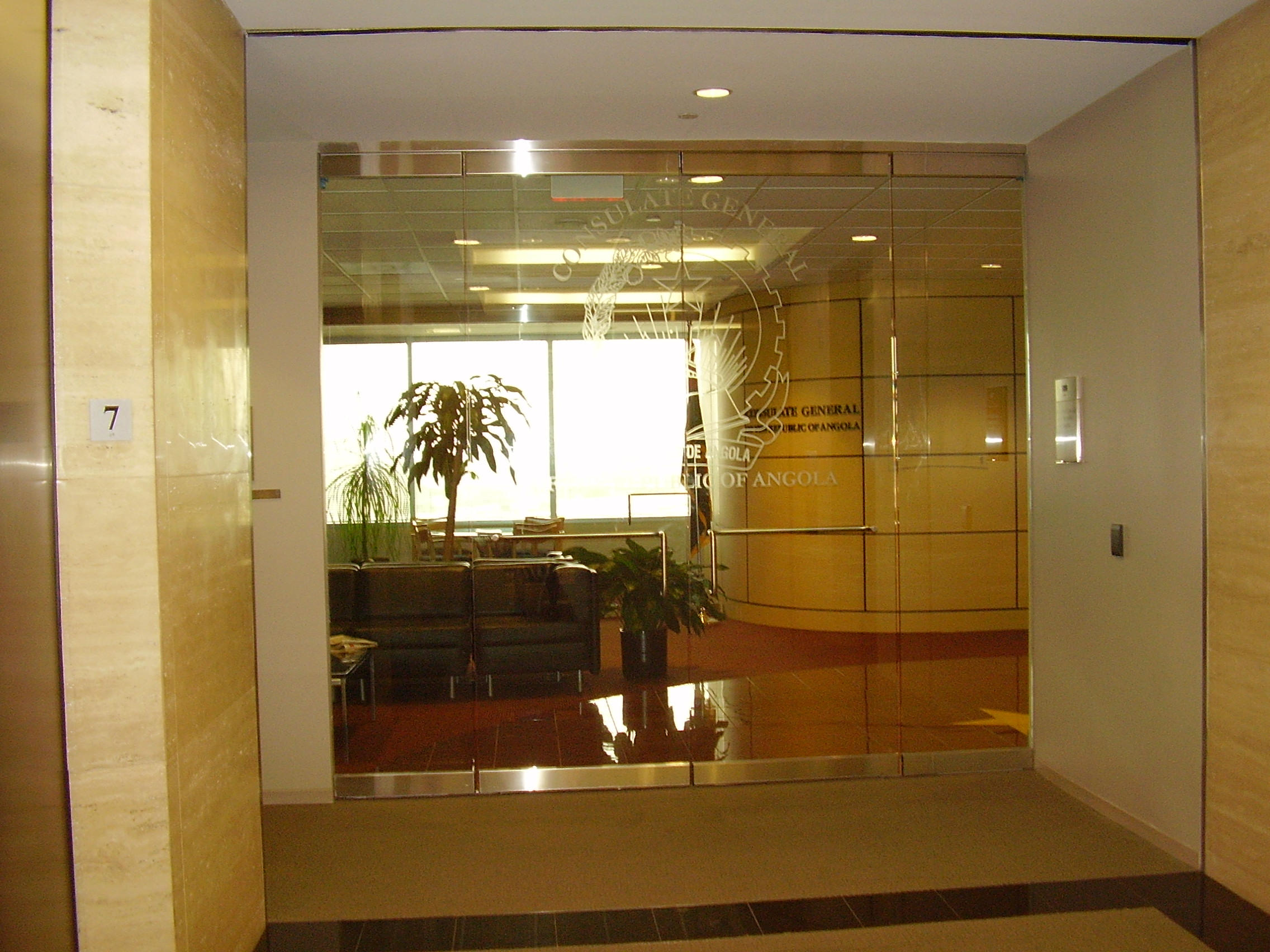
Consulate-General of Angola, Suite 780 in 3040 Post Oak Boulevard

== See also ==
- List of tallest buildings in Houston
- List of tallest buildings in Texas
