= Four Oaks Place =

Complex of skyscrapers

Coordinates: 29.754°N 95.461°W

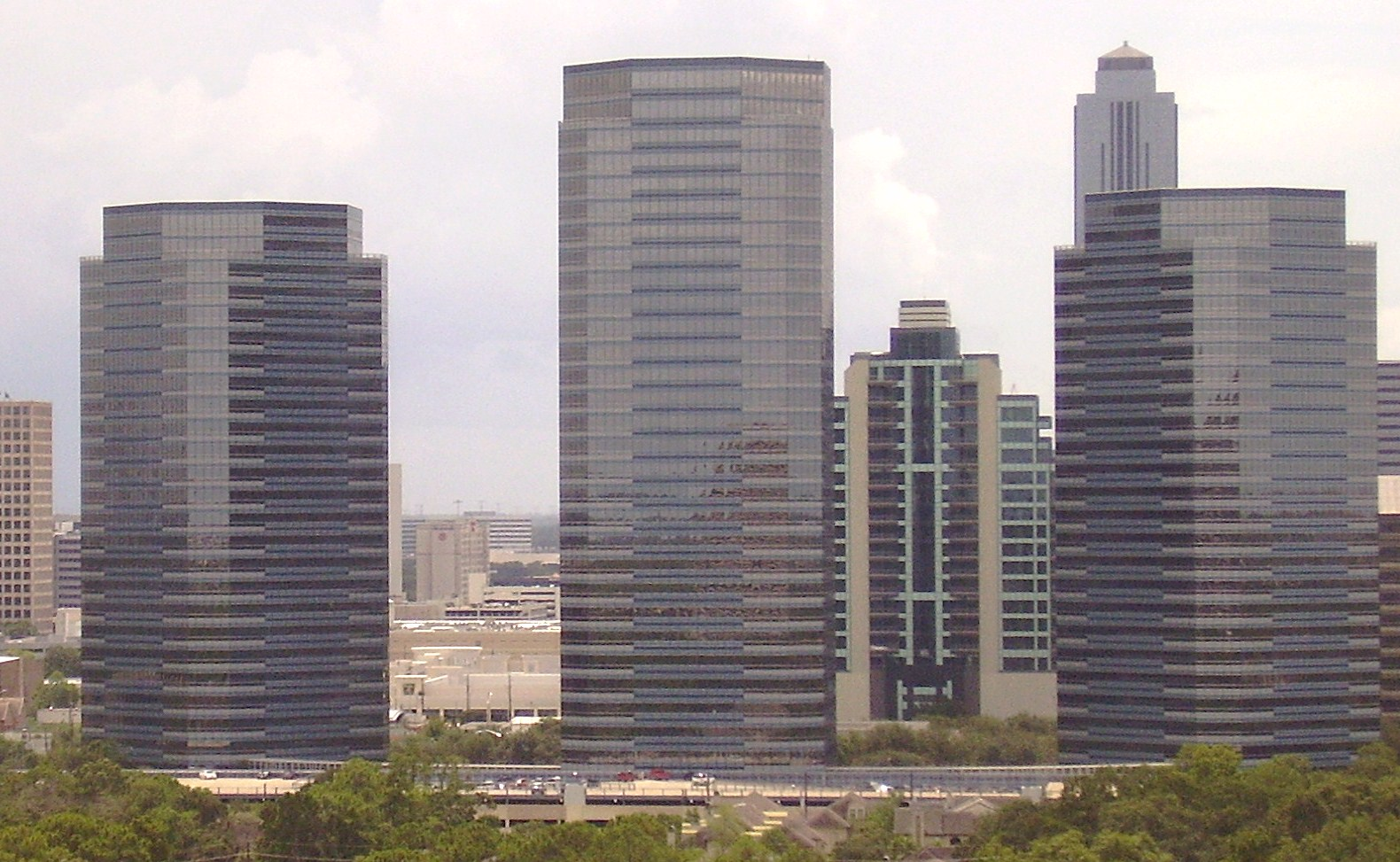
Three of the four buildings of Four Oaks Place

Four Oaks Place is a complex of skyscrapers in Uptown Houston, Texas, United States. Managed by CBRE, the complex includes the 420 ft (128 m) 1330 Post Oak Boulevard, the 25-story 351 ft (107m) BHP Billiton Tower (1360 Post Oak Boulevard), Wells Fargo Tower (1300 Post Oak Boulevard), and 1400 Post Oak Boulevard.

Four Oaks Place buildings were designed by Cesar Pelli & Associates Architects. The property also has newer addition 1500 Post Oak Boulevard housing Woodside Energy.

== History ==
In 1993 BHP Petroleum, the US subsidiary of BHP, announced that its U.S. headquarters was moving from San Felipe Plaza to the Cigna Tower (1360 Post Oak Blvd.). Two hundred clerical and professional employees moved into the building.

In the 1990s Weatherford Enterra (now Weatherford International) had its corporate headquarters in 1360 Post Oak. By 2000 Weatherford moved to a new location in Houston.

In 1999 Cushman & Wakefield, a realty firm, moved its Houston office from the Wells Fargo Tower into the America Tower in the American General Center in Neartown. By 2008 and as of 2009 Cushman & Wakefield's Houston office is now in the 1330 Post Oak building.

As of 2007 the owner of Four Oaks Place is considering plans to develop a fifth tower for the complex.

As of Feb 22, 2014, the foundation was poured for Five Oaks Place. The foundation consists of 2.5 million pounds of reinforcing steel and over 8,000 cu. yards of concrete.

== Tenants ==
The property houses three consulates: Chile, Italy, and the General of Germany.

== Gallery ==
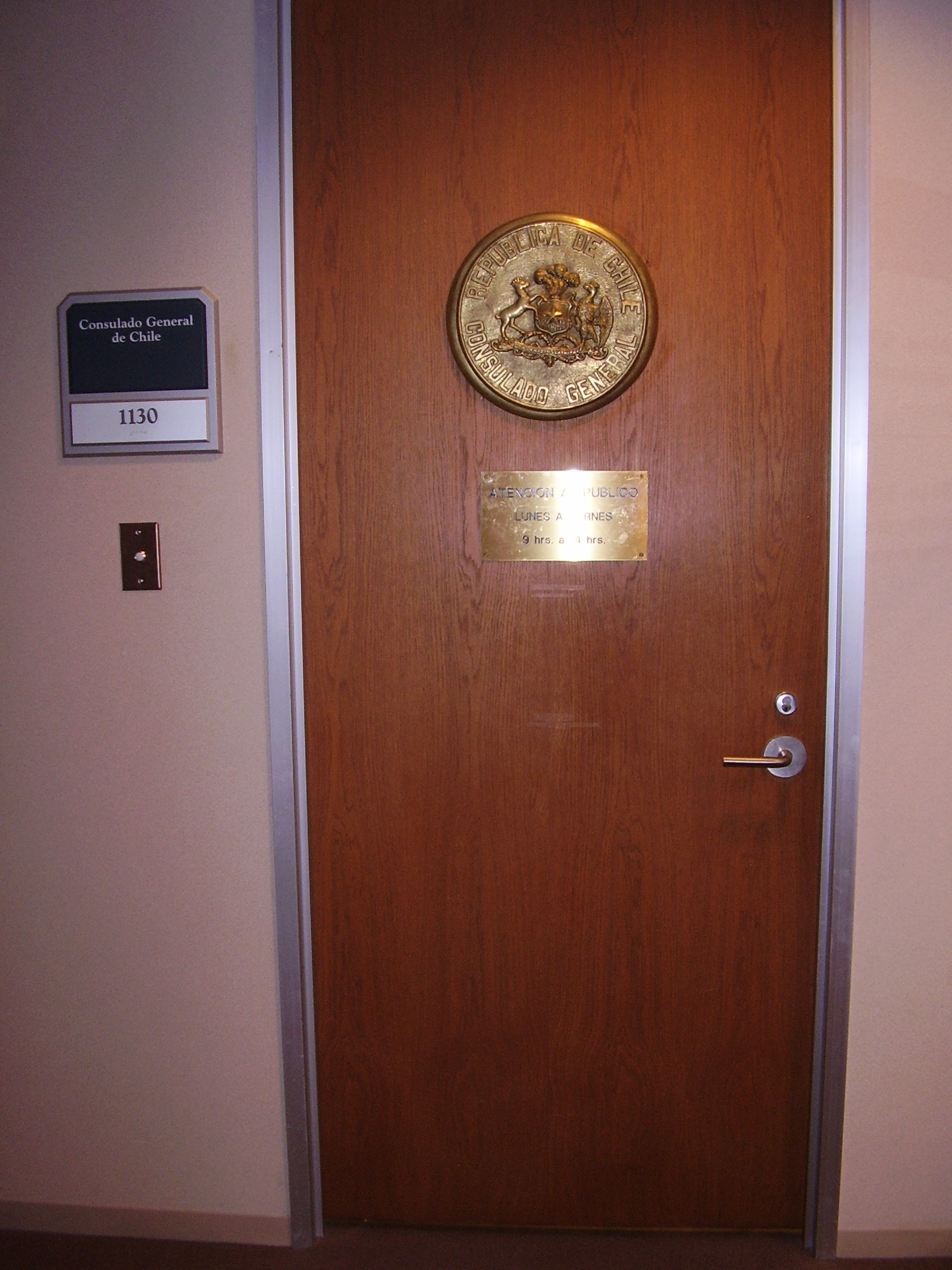
Consulate-General of Chile in Houston at Suite 1130 at the Wells Fargo Tower

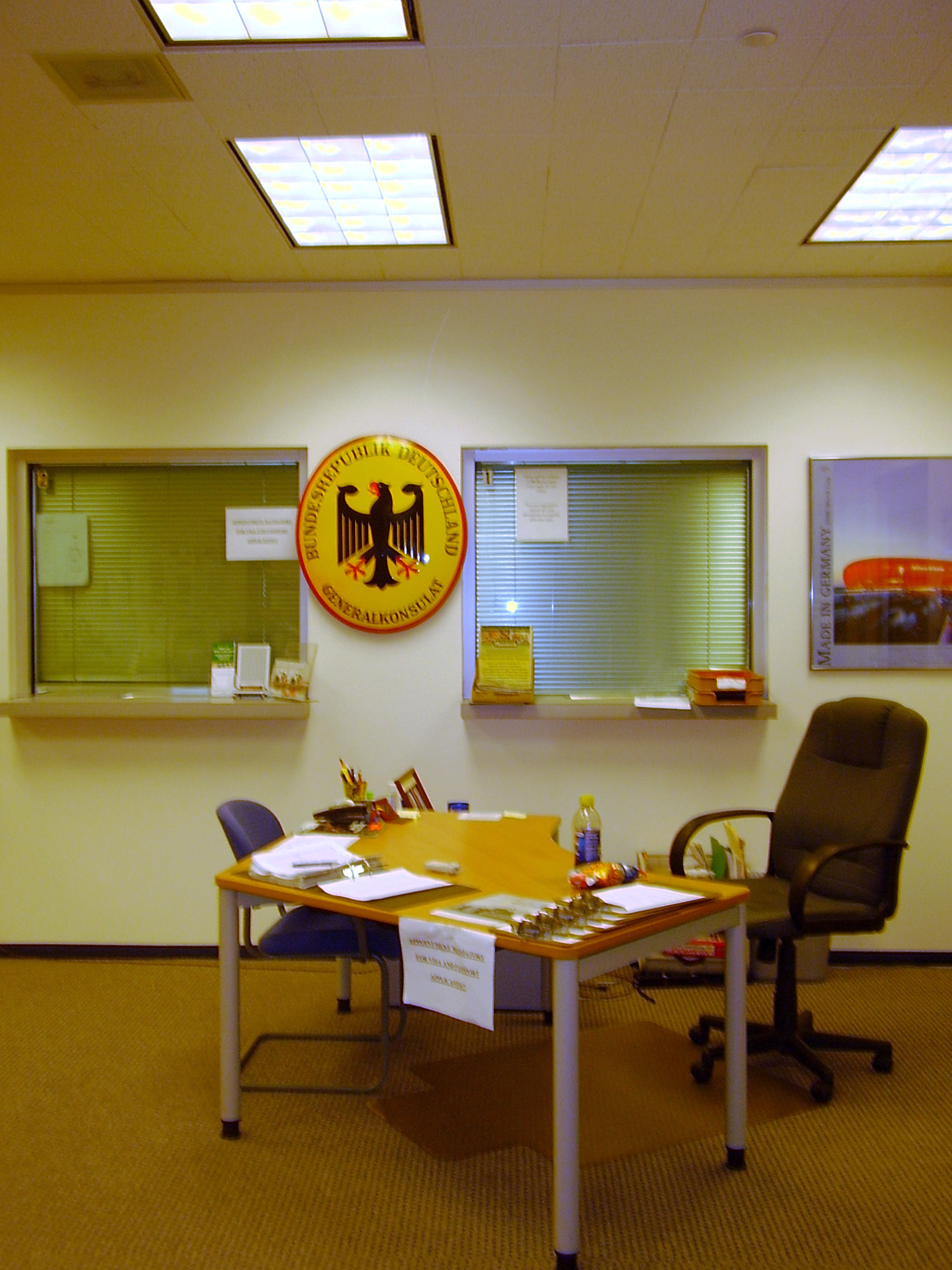
Consulate-General of Germany in Houston - Suite 1850 of 1330 Post Oak Boulevard

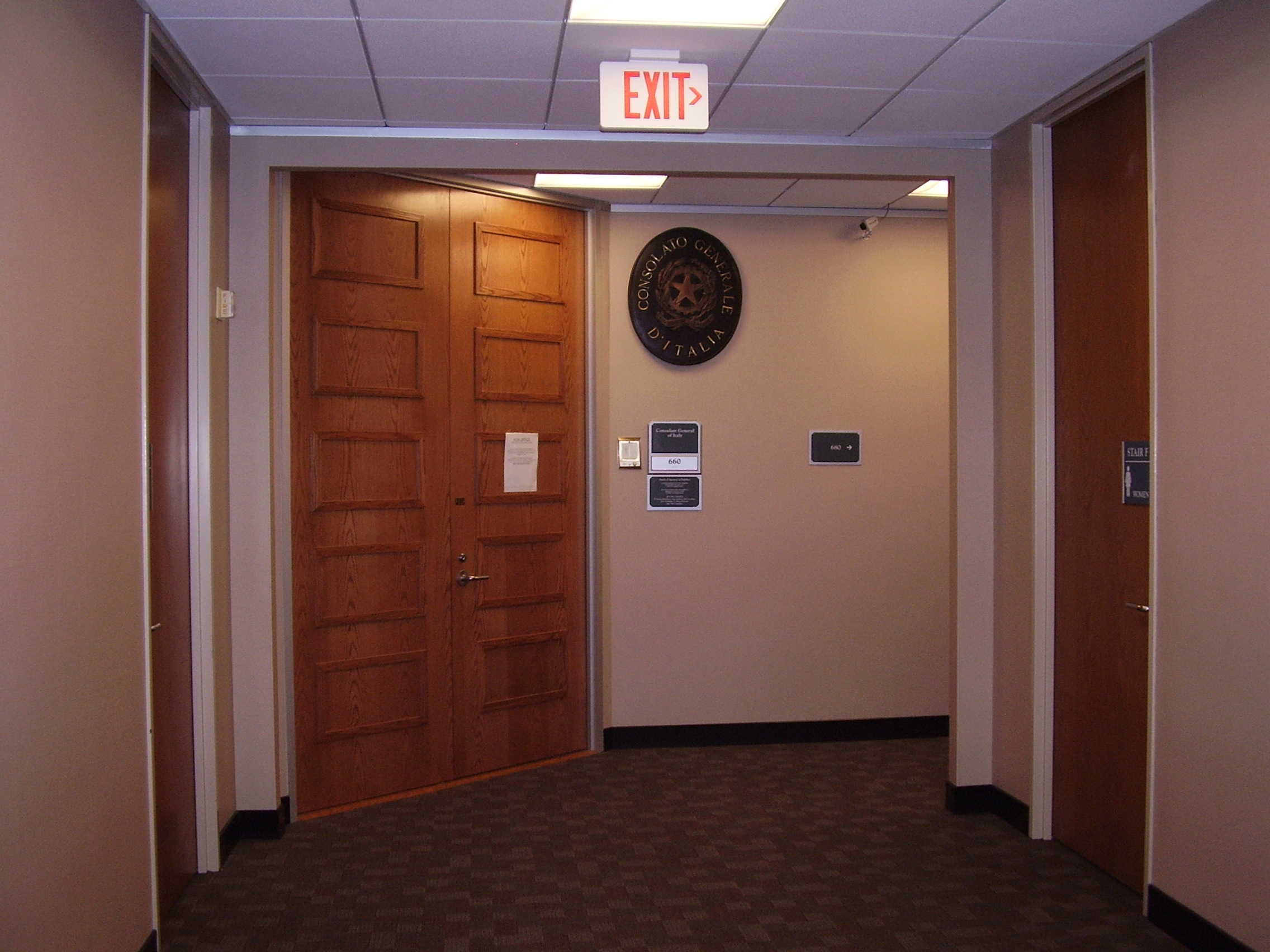
Consulate-General of Italy in Houston - Suite 660 at the Wells Fargo Tower
