= Valaris Limited =

Offshore drilling contractor

- Formerly: EnscoRowan plc
- Type: Public
- Traded as: NYSE: VAL; S&P 400 component
- Industry: Petroleum industry
- Founded: 1975; 51 years ago
- Headquarters: Hamilton, Bermuda (incorporation); San Felipe Plaza; Houston, Texas, U.S. (operational)
- Key people: Anton Dibowitz (CEO & President); Chris Weber (CFO)
- Services: Offshore drilling Well drilling
- Revenue: ▲US$2.37 billion (2025)
- Net income: ▲US$983 million (2025)
- Number of employees: 5,642, including contract personnel (2024)
- Website: www.valaris.com

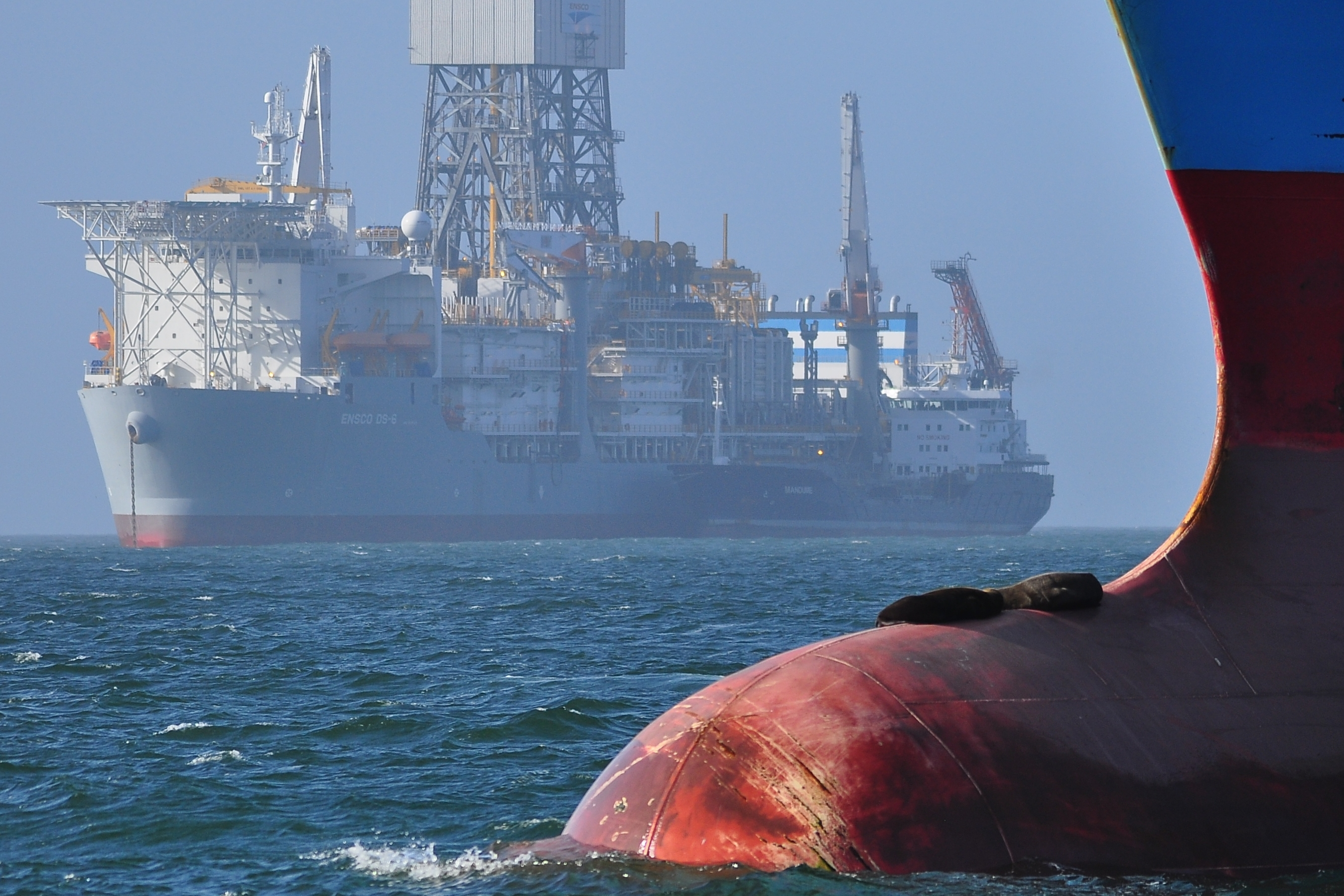
DS-6 Drillship taking on fuel bunkers in Walvis Bay, Namibia during the transit to Angola and start of a contract with BP.

Valaris Limited (previously ENSCO-Rowan plc) is an offshore drilling contractor headquartered in Houston, Texas, and incorporated in Bermuda. It is the largest offshore drilling and well drilling company in the world. As of February 2025, it owned 52 rigs, including 36 offshore jackup rigs, 11 drillships, and 5 semi-submersible platform drilling rigs.

In 2024, the company's largest customer was BP (17% of revenues) and the company's 5 largest customers accounted for 49% of revenues.

== History ==
In 1975, after the 1973 oil crisis, John R. Blocker bought Choya Energy, a six-rig contract drilling company based in Alice, Texas, and renamed the company Blocker Energy.

In 1980, the company became a public company via an initial public offering.

In 1981 and early 1982, the company borrowed heavily to expand its fleet to 54 rigs.

However, in late 1982, the price of oil plunged and, to avoid bankruptcy, Blocker Energy restructured, giving 64% of the company to its banks in exchange for $240 million in debt forgiveness. By 1983, the company was only operating 6 rigs, although that number increased to 24 in 1984. By 1985, the worldwide employee count of the company was down to 500.

Richard Rainwater's BEC Ventures made an investment in the company in 1986 and chose Carl F. Thorne to run the company, which he did until his retirement 20 years later.

In 1987, the company changed its name to Energy Service Company (Ensco).

In 1990, in a transaction orchestrated by Rainwater, who owned 21% of the company, the company acquired Penrod, previously controlled by Ray Lee Hunt, which added 19 rigs to its fleet.

In 2010, the company moved its headquarters to London and became a UK-registered company.

In May 2011, the company acquired Pride International. The company closed its Dallas office and consolidated it into its Houston office.

In October 2017, the company acquired Atwood Oceanics for $860 million and became the largest owner of jackup fleets worldwide.

In 2019, the company merged with Rowan Companies and changed its name to Valaris plc.

In August 2020, the company filed for a prearranged bankruptcy. It emerged from bankruptcy in May 2021.

== See also ==
- List of oilfield service companies
