= Atwood Oceanics =

American energy company

Atwood Oceanics, Inc.
- Industry: Petroleum industry
- Founded: 1968; 58 years ago
- Defunct: October 6, 2017; 8 years ago
- Fate: Acquired by Ensco plc
- Headquarters: Houston, Texas
- Products: Offshore drilling
- Revenue: ▲$1.395 billion (FY 2015)
- Operating income: ▲$531 million (FY 2015)
- Net income: ▲$432 million (FY 2015)
- Total assets: ▲$4.809 billion (FY 2015)
- Total equity: ▲$2.947 billion (FY 2015)
- Number of employees: 1,868 (2015)

Atwood Oceanics, Inc. was an offshore drilling contractor headquartered in Houston, Texas. In October 2017, the company was acquired by Ensco plc.

The company owned and operated 4 ultra-deepwater drillships, 2 ultra-deepwater semisubmersibles (can drill in water up to 12,000' deep), 2 deepwater semisubmersibles, and 5 high-specification jackup rigs.

In fiscal 2015, 5 customers accounted for a total of 63% of revenues: Noble Energy, Royal Dutch Shell, Woodside Petroleum, Chevron Corporation, and Kosmos Energy.

In fiscal 2015, the company derived 76% of its revenue from its 6 deepwater drillships and semisubmersibles.

In fiscal 2015, 71% of the company's revenues were derived outside of the United States. The company derived more of its revenues in Australia than in any other country.

== History ==
The company was founded in 1968 by John Atwood.

The company began operation by 1970. In 1972, the company became a public company.

In October 2017, the company was acquired by Ensco plc (now Valaris Limited).

== See also ==
- 100 Fastest-Growing Companies 2010: All Stars - FORTUNE
- 100 Fastest-Growing Companies 2008: Atwood Oceanics - ATW - from FORTUNE
- Atwood Oceanics’ John Irwinto lead IADC into 21st Century
- Offshore career no ‘walkabout’for 2000 IADC Chair John Irwin
- Generations: a changing industry
- Exception
- GOODWYN ‘A’ DRILLING FACILITIES
- New Atwood jackup utilizes proven technology
- May 05 Connect IADC
- James Holland - Atwood Oceanics Inc (atw)
- Atwood Presentation - Credit Suisse Feb 8
- May 04 Connect IADC
- Derek Morrow, Atwood Oceanics: From Scotsman to Aussie, he’s never looked back
- Atwood’s Holloway receives Exemplary Service Award
- Mark Childers awarded for service, innovation
- HBJ 2006 EOY
