= VALIC =

The Variable Annuity Life Insurance Company
- Industry: Insurance
- Headquarters: Houston, Texas
- Products: Mutual funds; Fixed and variable annuities; Wealth management; Life insurance; Brokerage accounts; Employer retirement plans
- Parent: Corebridge Financial

The Variable Annuity Life Insurance Company, or VALIC, is a subsidiary of Corebridge Financial, Inc., (CRBG) that specializes in tax-qualified retirement plans, supplemental tax-deferred and after-tax investments. It is headquartered in Houston, Texas.

== Organization ==
Corebridge's VALIC subsidiary serves nearly 21,000 plan sponsors across 50 US states.

VALIC companies include The Variable Annuity Life Insurance Company, VALIC Financial Advisors, Inc. and VALIC Retirement Services Company.

The company has co-sponsored the AASA National Superintendent of the Year Award for over a decade.

== Products ==
VALIC offers a variety of products, including:

- Mutual fund programs
- Fixed, variable and income annuities
- Asset management programs
- Life insurance
- Brokerage accounts
- College savings plans
- Group and Individual retirement accounts—Traditional IRA, Roth IRA, Spousal IRA, Money Market Consolidator

== See also ==
- American International Group
