= Four Leaf Towers =

Residential complex in Houston, Texas

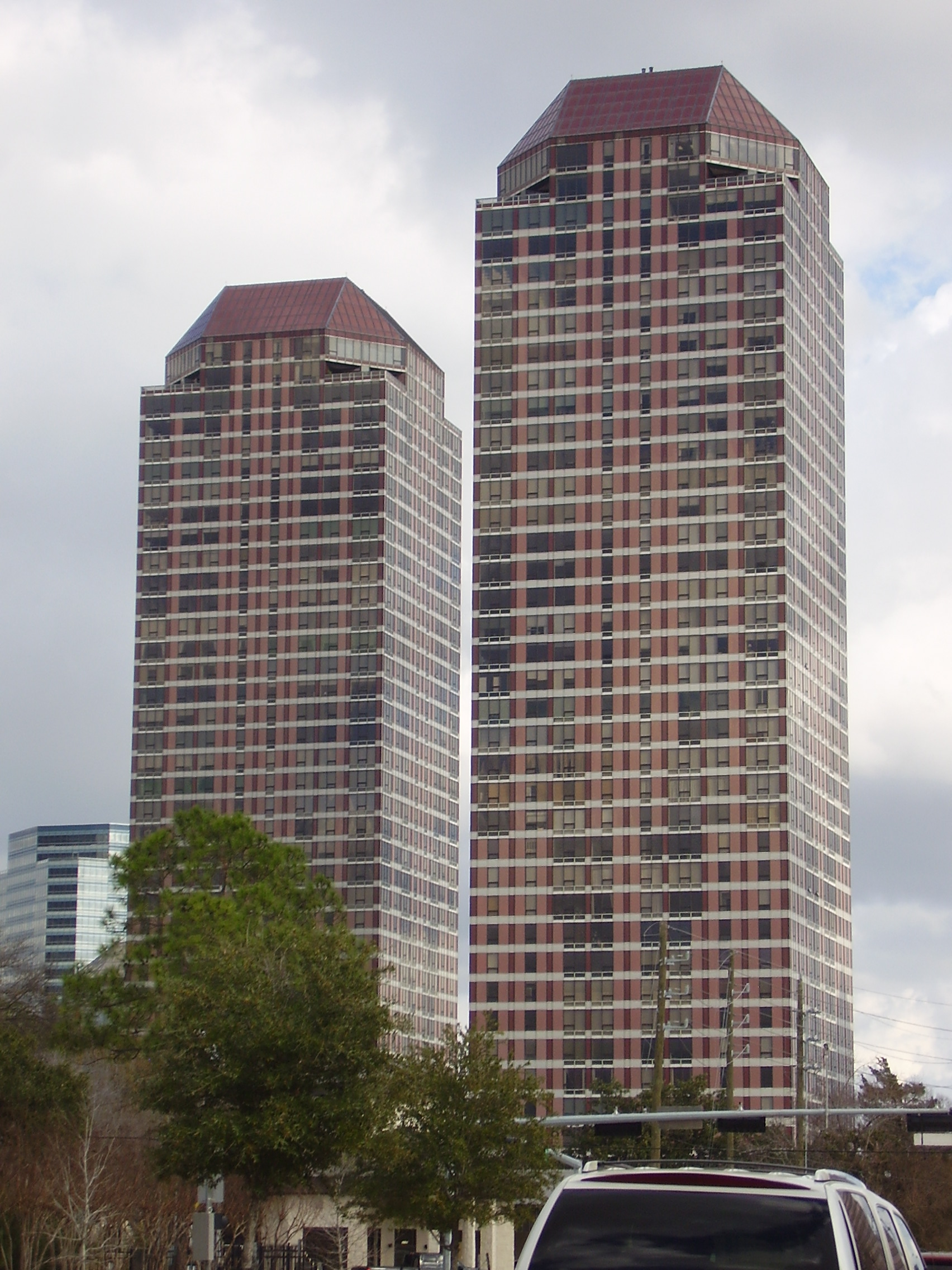

General information
- Status: Completed
- Type: Residential
- Location: 5100 San Felipe, Houston, Texas
- Coordinates: 29.751°N 95.464°W
- Opening: 1982

Technical details
- Floor count: 40

Design and construction
- Architect: Cesar Pelli

Four Leaf Towers is a high-rise residential complex located in Houston, Texas, United States, on San Felipe Street adjacent to the Uptown Houston district. They were designed by architect Cesar Pelli.

== Description and history ==
Designed by architect Cesar Pelli and constructed in 1982, the two towers in the complex each contain 200 condominium units. The 40-story condominium towers are situated in park-like setting. The outdoor sculpture, "Polygenesis" by Beverly Pepper is located at the front of the complex.

At 4:15 AM on October 13, 2001, a fire occurred in a fifth floor unit in the west tower. Houston Fire Department firefighter Captain Jay Jahnke died while fighting the fire. Resident, Charles Harrison Dill, also died. Over 175 firefighters extinguished the fire. It is believed under staffing and mistakes led to the deaths.

== Zoned schools ==
The Four Leaf Towers are within the Houston Independent School District.

Residents are zoned to Briargrove Elementary School, Tanglewood Middle School (formerly Grady Middle School), and Wisdom High School (formerly Lee High School) with Lamar and Westside high schools as options.

== See also ==
- List of tallest buildings in Houston
- List of tallest buildings in Texas
