= Retirement planning =

Allocation of savings or revenue for retirement

Retirement planning, in a financial context, refers to the allocation of savings or revenue for retirement. The goal of retirement planning is to achieve financial independence. In the Federal Reserve's October 2025 Survey of Household Economics and Decisionmaking, 35 percent of U.S. adults who were not retired said their retirement savings plan was on track. This was unchanged from 2024 and up from 2022 and 2023, but below the 40 percent recorded in 2021.

The process of retirement planning aims to:

- Assess readiness-to-retire given a desired retirement age and lifestyle, i.e., whether one has enough money to retire
- Identify actions to improve readiness-to-retire
- Acquire financial planning knowledge
- Encourage saving practices

== Obtaining a financial plan ==
Producers such as a financial planner or financial adviser can help clients develop retirement plans, where compensation is either fee-based or commissioned contingent on product sale; see Professional certification in financial services. Such an arrangement is sometimes viewed as in conflict with a consumer's interest, and that the advice rendered cannot be without bias, or at a cost that justifies its value. Consumers can now elect a do it yourself (DIY) approach. For example, retirement web-tools in the form of a calculator, mathematical model or decision support system are available online. A web-based tool that allows client to fully plan, without human intervention, might be considered a producer. Key motivations of the DIY trend are many of the same arguments for lean manufacturing, a constructive alteration of the relationship between producer and consumer.

A good retirement plan should consider:

- Financial Planning
  1. Savings and Investments: Enough savings and a well-thought-out investment plan are crucial. This includes retirement accounts like 401(k)s, IRAs, and other investment vehicles.
  2. Income Streams: Consideration of various income streams in retirement, such as Social Security benefits, pensions, annuities, and earnings from investments.
  3. Budget and Expenses: A realistic budget that accounts for daily living expenses, leisure activities, and unforeseen costs.
  4. Inflation and Tax Planning: Strategies to mitigate the impact of inflation and optimize tax liabilities.
- Healthcare Planning
  1. Medicare and Supplemental Insurance: Understanding Medicare coverage and whether supplemental insurance is needed.
  2. Long-term Care Insurance: Considering the potential need for long-term care and how to finance it.
  3. Health Savings Account (HSA): Utilizing an HSA for future healthcare expenses, if available.
- What lifestyle the person seeks to achieve in retirement: their needs and wants
- The country the person may seek to retire to, sometimes different from where they accumulated their retirement savings.
- A projection of all significant assets, liabilities, incomes and spending at the household level (including social security pensions)
- The person's ability to save for retirement while working, and an assessment of whether this will indeed be enough to cover their needs
- All issues that will have a material impact on future outcomes - to allow informed decisions to be made e.g. the person's chosen retirement age
- The potential variability of future unknowns such as investment returns, inflation rates and the lifespan of each spouse
- The link between health, lifestyle factors and life expectancy. Lifespan assessments should be appropriate for the retiree and allow for longevity improvement trends

== Modeling and limitations ==
Retirement finances touch upon distinct subject areas or financial domains of client importance, including: investments (i.e., stocks, bonds, mutual funds); real estate; debt; taxes; cash flow (income and expense) analysis; insurance; defined benefits (e.g., social security, traditional pensions).

There is often a complex interaction between the things that the person can control over time (like their investment mix, saving level while working, spending level in retirement and, to an extent, the timing of retirement and part time work undertaken) and things that are outside their control (like market performance, inflation, tax and social security rules and the length of their lifespan).

From an analytic perspective, each domain can be formally characterized and modeled using a different class representation, as defined by a domain's unique set of attributes and behaviors. Domain models require definition only at a level of abstraction necessary for decision analysis. Since planning is about the future, domains need to extend beyond current state description and address uncertainty, volatility, change dynamics (i.e., constancy or determinism is not assumed). Together, these factors raise significant challenges to any current producer claim of model predictability or certainty. Volatility in investment markets raises questions for everyone, participants, and fiduciaries alike. With the growth of 401(k) and other individual account retirement plans, many participants are responsible for investing their retirement savings.

== Stochastic modelling ==
Retirees often face significant financial risk in retirement (unless they have guaranteed products like defined benefit pensions or lifetime annuities). Each individual doesn’t know how long they will live or what sequence of market returns they will experience in retirement.

Ideally, retirement models should calculate the probability of achieving the person’s required living standard for as long as they live, and calculate the probability of achieving various other goals. Quantitative specialists and actuaries will fit a statistical distribution to key random variables that impact results - such as market returns, human lifespans and inflation rates. These can be used to generate probability weighted scenarios of what a retiree could experience over the decades in retirement.

The Monte Carlo method is a common form of a mathematical model that is applied to predict long-term investment behavior for a client's retirement planning. Its use helps to identify adequacy of client's investment to attain retirement readiness and to clarify strategic choices and actions. It's important to note the investment domain is only a financial domain and therefore is incomplete on its own. Depending on client context, the investment domain may have very little importance in relation to a client's other domains—e.g., a client who receives a guaranteed annuity or social security pension.

Modern retirement models are starting to applying similar techniques at household level too – projecting all significant assets, liabilities, and incomes of the household and stress testing a full range of market sequences and lifespan scenarios (for each spouse). The approach can deal with the complex interdependencies between subject areas (domains) mentioned above as well as tax and legislative provisions.

== Other models ==
Contemporary retirement planning models have yet to be validated in the sense that the models purport to project a future that has yet to manifest itself. The criticism with contemporary models are some of the same levied against Neoclassical economics. The critic argues that contemporary models may only have proven validity retrospectively, whereas it is the indeterminate future that needs solution. A more moderate school believes that retirement planning methods must further evolve by adopting a more robust and integrated set of tools from the field of complexity science. Recent research has explored the effects of the elimination of capital income taxes on saving-for-retirement opportunities and its impact on government debt.

== See also ==
- Individual retirement account
- Retirement plans in the United States
