= Uptown Houston =

Uptown Houston The Galleria area
- Neighborhood of Houston
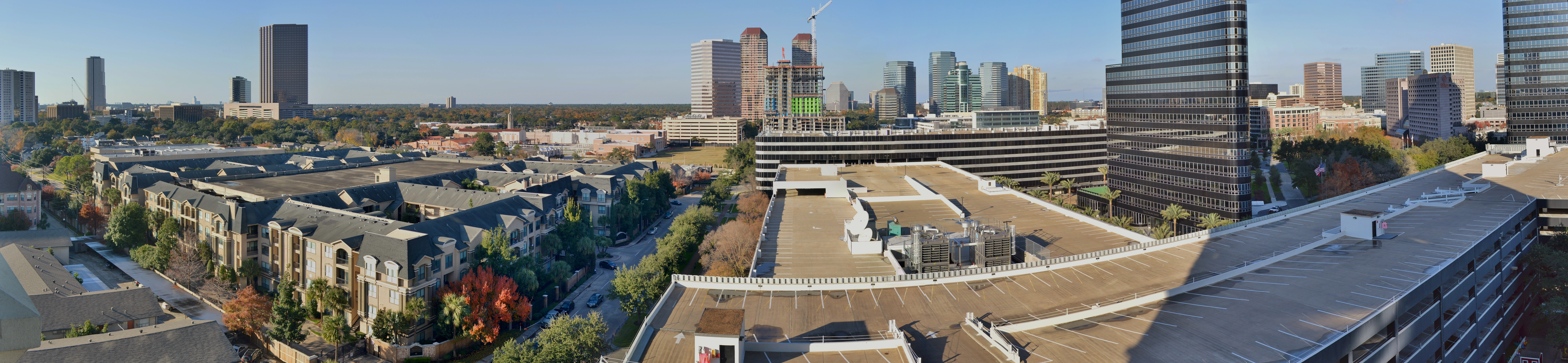
- Uptown Houston Skyline

- Interactive map of Uptown Houston
- Coordinates: 29°44′46″N 95°27′50″W
- Country: United States
- State: Texas
- County: Harris
- City: Houston
- Website: uptown-houston.com

Uptown (more commonly called The Galleria Area) is a business district in Houston, located 6.2 miles (10.0 km) west of Downtown and is centered along Post Oak Boulevard and Westheimer Road (Farm to Market Road 1093). The Uptown District is roughly bounded by Woodway Drive to the north, I-610 (West Loop) to the east, Richmond Avenue to the south, and Yorktown Street to the west. It covers 1,010 acres (410 ha).

At 23.6 million square feet (2.19 million square meters) of office space, the Uptown District is the 17th-largest business district in the United States, comparable in size to the downtowns of Denver and Pittsburgh. The district is home to approximately 2,000 companies and represents more than 11 percent of Houston's total office space.

== History ==
In 1948, what is now Uptown was 3 miles (5 km) outside the city limits of Houston. A local reporter described the roads as "lonely, unlit, pockmarked booby trap for nocturnal animals and boozed up motorists." Development increased after Gerald D. Hines and other individuals began to develop properties in Uptown in the 1960s.

By 1987, the Uptown area had more hotel rooms and retail shopping centers than Downtown Houston had. The Uptown area, with 55,000 employees, also had more office space than Downtown Atlanta and Downtown Denver.

== Overview ==
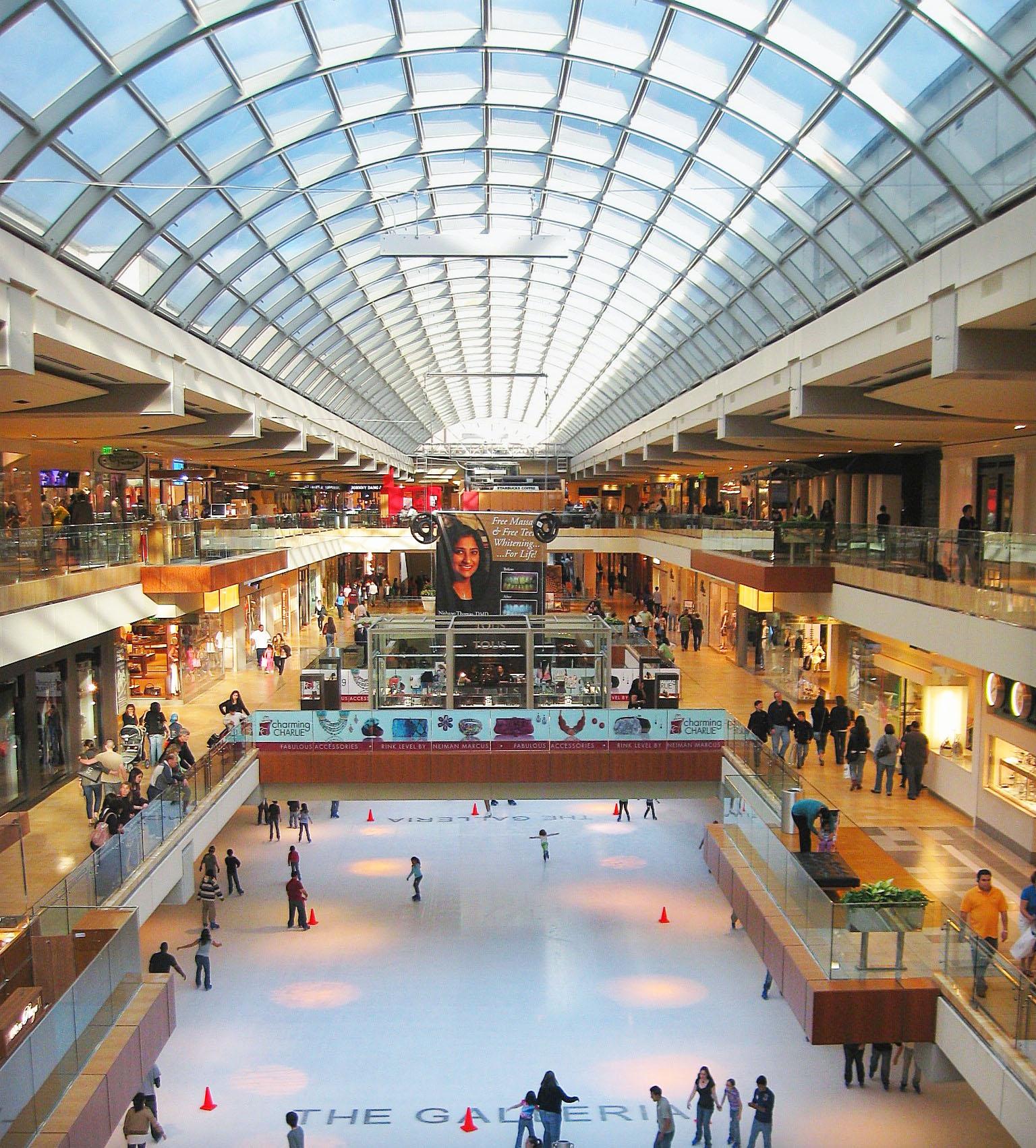
The Galleria in the Uptown District is the largest mall in Texas.

The Uptown District measures about 5 million square feet (500,000 m^{2}) of retail space, and is the center for Houston's high-fashion retail. Various trendy shopping centers, eateries, and other sorts of entertainment venues exist in the district. Uptown is home to many upscale boutiques, as well as many Houston-based and local high-fashion designers and stores. Uptown is also host to Houston's largest hotels, which host about 20 million visitors a year.

A major feature of Uptown Houston is The Galleria, the largest shopping mall in the state of Texas and the seventh-largest in America. The Galleria hosts many of the upscale shops of the area as well as citywide chain stores that appear in many Houston-area malls. It also includes several well-regarded restaurants and a large indoor ice skating rink.

== Cityscape ==
The Uptown District is bounded by Woodway Drive to the north, the I-610 (West Loop) to the east, Interstate 69/U.S. Highway 59 to the south, and Yorktown Street to the west.

Several subdivisions, including Afton Oaks, Briarcroft, Briargrove, Broad Oaks, Briarmeadow, Del Monte, Larchmont, St. George Place, Tanglewood, and Westhaven Estates border Uptown Houston.

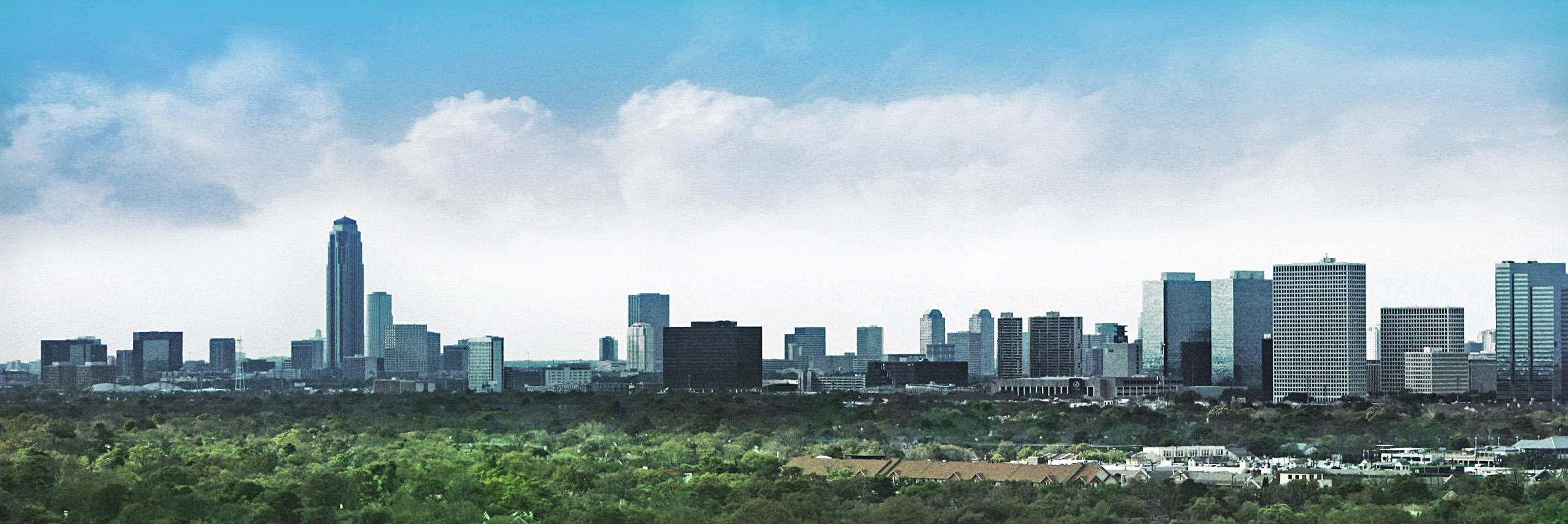
Uptown Houston

== Economy ==
Uptown, the 17th largest business district in the United States, has 23,600,000 square feet (2,190,000 m^{2}) of office space, representing 11% of all of Houston's office space and 22% of Houston's Class A office space. Major employers include 3D/International, Air Liquide, Aon, Apache Corporation, BBVA Compass, BHP, Bechtel Corporation, Beirne, Maynard & Parsons, Bindview Corporation, CBRE, Dow Chemical, Duke Energy, General Electric, Hines, iHeartMedia, Inoapps, Litton Loan Servicing, Marathon Oil Corporation, MWH Americas, Net IQ Corporation, Nextira One, Panhandle Pipeline Co, Schlumberger, Stewart Title Guaranty Company, Telecheck International, The Lab Consulting, GDF Suez Energy Resources NA, and Williams Companies. Around 2,000 companies maintain operations in Uptown.

Numerous radio studios are located in Uptown. Two of the four major English-language commercial radio broadcasters have studios here. Three radio stations owned by Urban One, which are KKBQ, KGLK, and KHPT, is in 3 Post Oak Central. The IHeartMedia Houston cluster of KBME, KODA, KQBT, KPRC (AM), KTBZ-FM, and KTRH is located in 2000 West Loop South. Spanish-language Univision Communications Houston TV studio (KXLN-DT and KFTH-DT) and radio cluster (KLTN, KAMA-FM, KLAT, KOVE-FM and KQBU-FM) is located near the Southwest Freeway and Loop 610 interchange.

Cushman & Wakefield's Houston office is in Four Oaks Place.

In the 1990s Weatherford Enterra (now Weatherford International) had its corporate headquarters in Four Oaks Place. By 2000 Weatherford moved to a new location in Houston. Before its dissolution Stanford Financial Group had its headquarters in Uptown.

Many international hotel chains have locations in Uptown.

== Diplomatic missions ==
Several consulates-general are located in Uptown. The consulates of Angola, Australia, Argentina, Chile, Denmark, France, Germany, India, Italy, Peru, Qatar, South Korea, Spain, Turkey, and Vietnam are in Uptown.

From its founding on May 25, 1982, to April 1988, the Consulate-General of Indonesia in Houston was located in Post Oak Central in Uptown. The Consulate-General of Egypt in Houston was located in Suite 1750 at 2000 West Loop South and later in Suite 2180 in Post Oak Central. As of 2008 the consulate is now at 5718 Westheimer Road, outside Uptown.

The Consulate of the Netherlands was in Uptown.

== Architecture ==
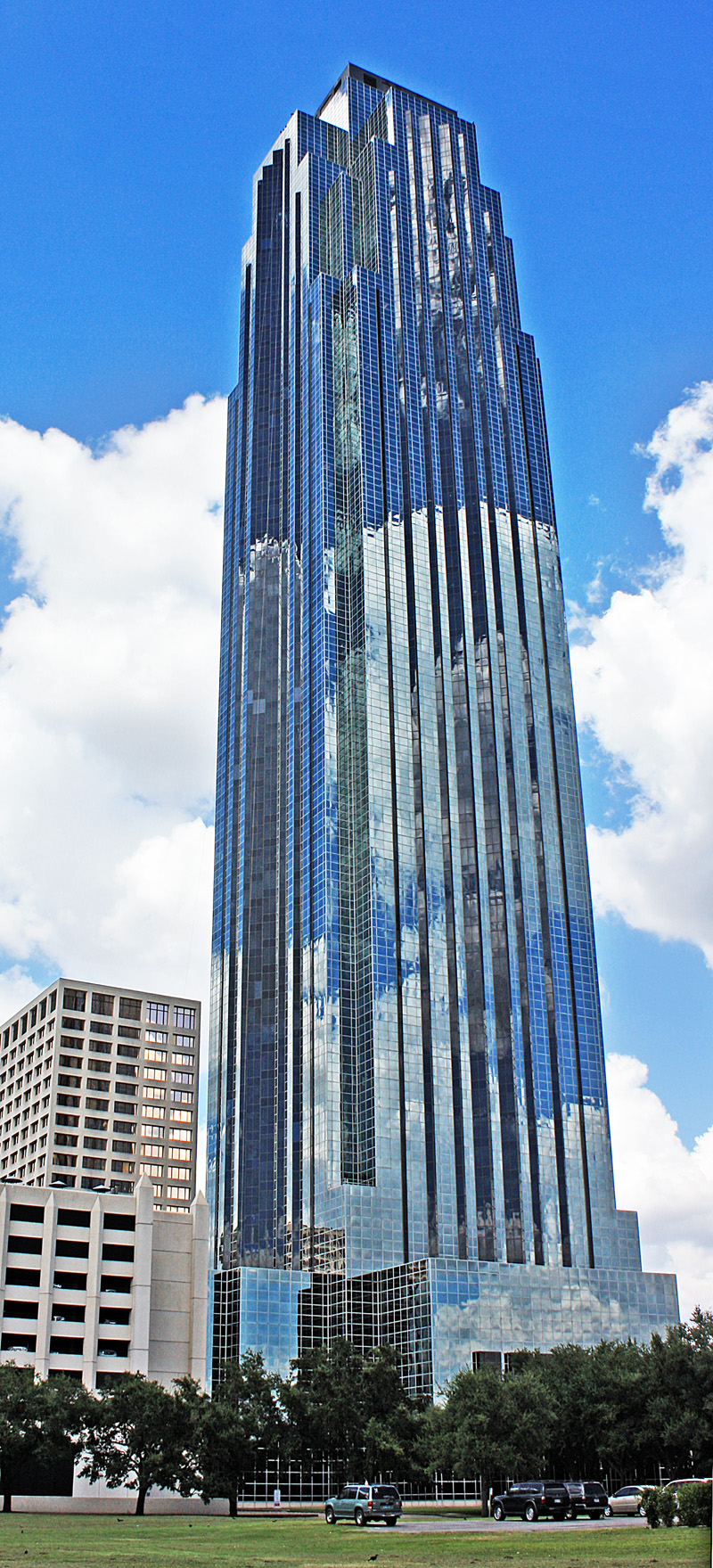
Williams Tower

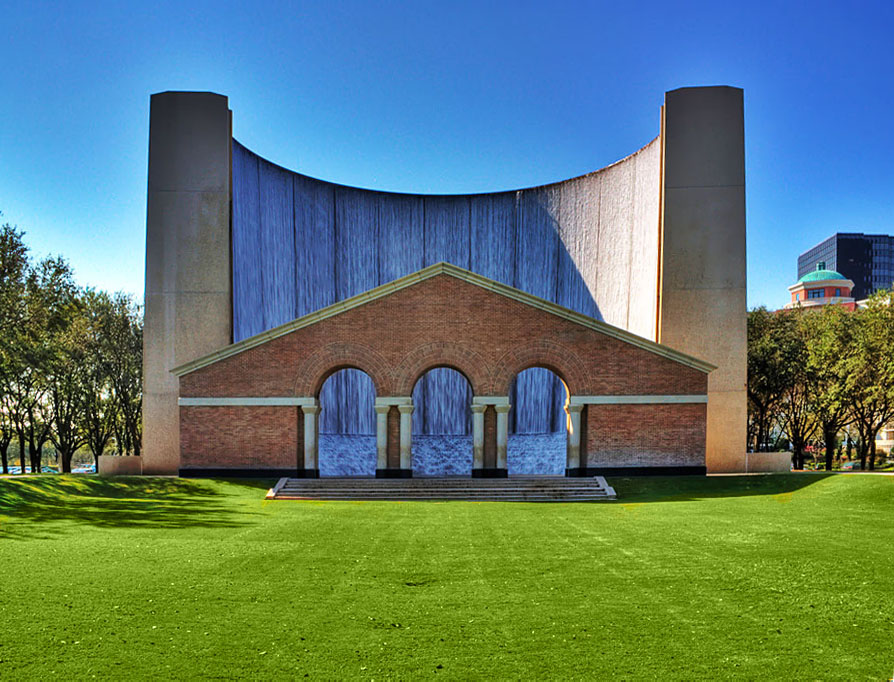
The Williams Waterwall

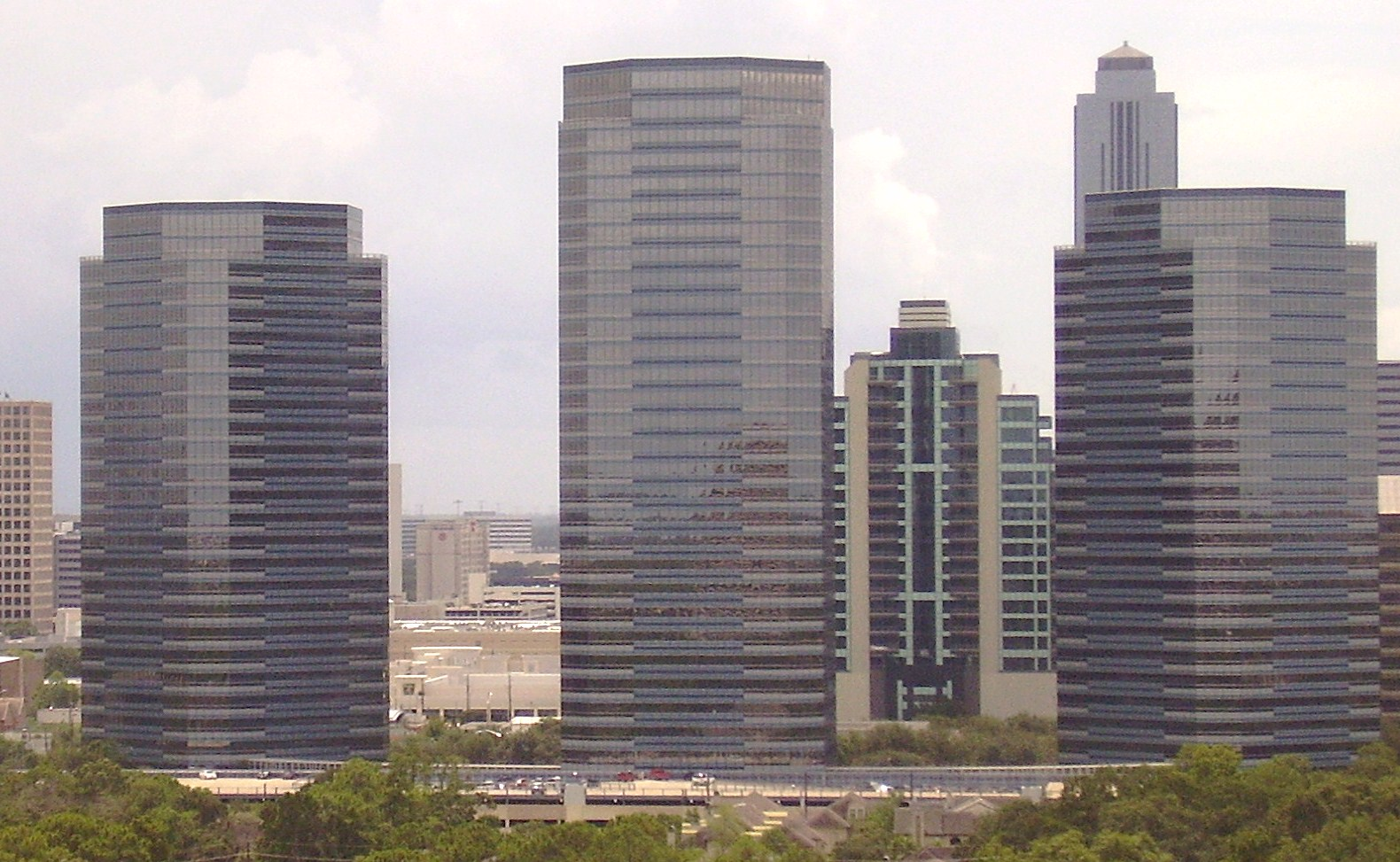
Three of the four buildings of Four Oaks Place

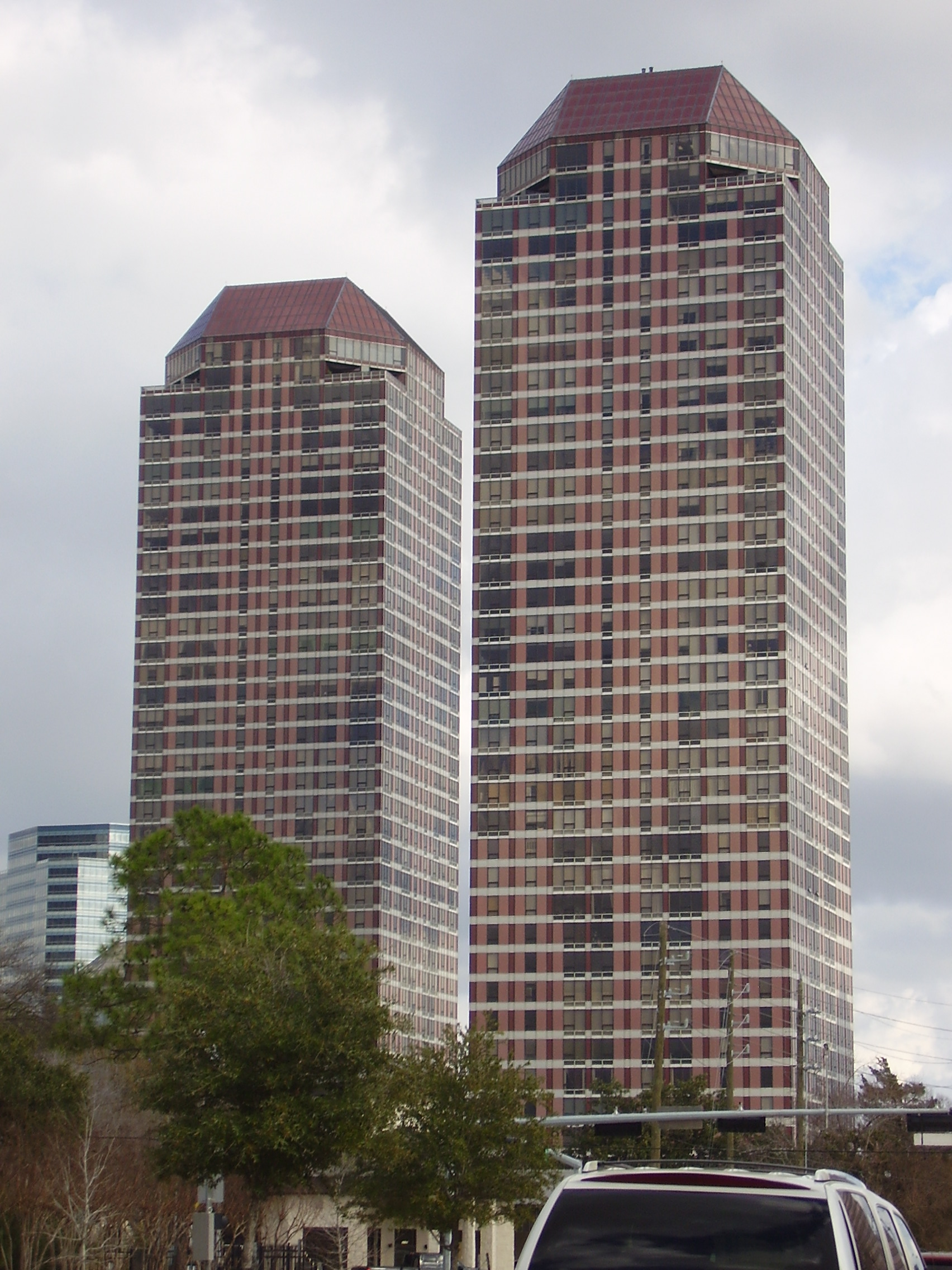
Four Leaf Towers

The Uptown District boomed along with Houston during the 1970s and early 1980s. A collection of mid-rise office buildings appeared along the Interstate 610 west (or simply "West Loop"). It became one of the most impressive instances of the edge city. The highest achievement of Uptown was the construction of the 901-foot-tall (275 m) landmark Williams Tower, designed by Philip Johnson (known as the Transco Tower until 1999). At the time, it was believed to be the world's tallest skyscraper outside of a central business district. The Williams Tower was the product of a unique era in Houston: energy companies were highly profitable entities and they sought impressive, monumental structures to broadcast their power. The Williams Waterwall is a multi-story sculptural fountain which sits at the south end of Williams Tower in Uptown. It and its surrounding park were built as an architectural amenity to the adjacent tower. Both the fountain and tower were designed by Pritzker Prize winning architect Philip Johnson. Construction of the complex was completed in 1983. The semi-circular fountain is 64 feet (20 m) tall and sits among 118 Texas Live Oak trees. Approximately 11,000 US gallons (42,000 L; 9,200 imp gal) of water flow over both sides of the wall every minute. The Uptown District is also home to other buildings designed by noted architects such as I. M. Pei and César Pelli among others also designed by Philip Johnson; Pelli designed the Four Oaks Place complex. Large-scale office construction in Uptown came to an end with the collapse of energy prices and the meltdown of Houston's economy in the mid-to-late 1980s. Uptown had 23.8 million square feet (2,210,000 m^{2}) of office space in 2001, whereas Downtown Houston had about 40 million square feet (4,000,000 m^{2}). In the late 1990s, there was a mini-boom of mid-rise residential tower construction, typically about 30 stories tall. Uptown has accumulated a large concentration of high-rise residential structures.

Four Leaf Towers, a high-rise residential complex consisting of two 40-story buildings located on San Felipe Street was constructed in 1982. The towers were designed by architect César Pelli.

Completed in 2004, Saint Martin's Episcopal Church (with spires and antennae reaching 188 feet (57 m) into the sky), designed by Jackson & Ryan Architects, was featured on the covers of three national magazines: Civil Engineering magazine (April 2005), Modern Steel Construction magazine (May 2005) and Structure magazine (December 2005).

== Government and infrastructure ==
=== Local government ===
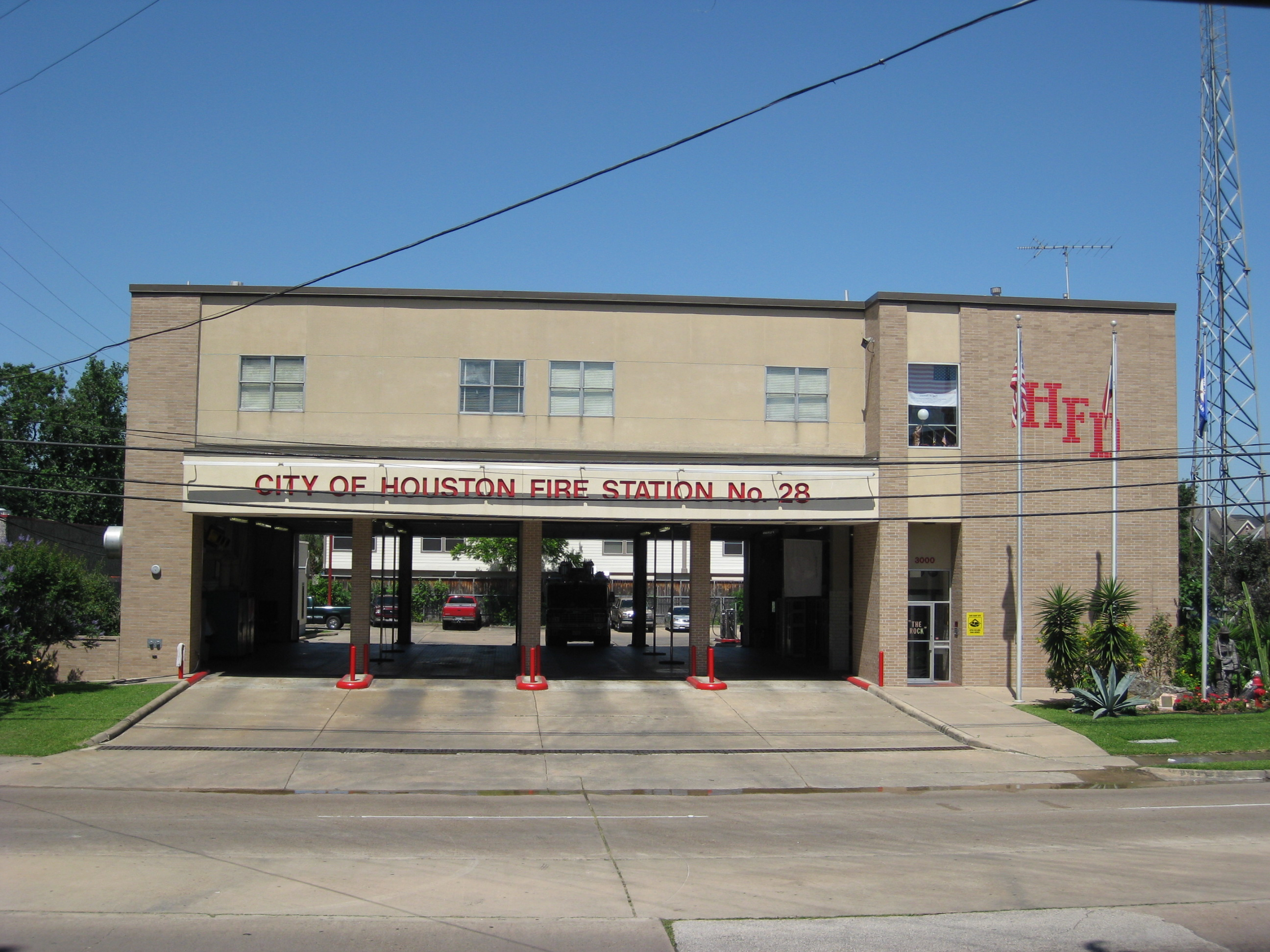
Fire Station 28

Uptown Houston is a Tax Increment Reinvestment Zone (TIRZ), which is a self-imposed taxing entity created by property owners in economically challenged areas in order to fund improvements and encourage development within the zone. The area was designated as a TIRZ by city council. The Uptown District has used the funds for landscaping and mobility improvements as well as specialty street lamps, signage and stainless steel gateways and halos over major streets and intersections.

Houston Fire Department operates Fire Station 28, a station in District 28, west of Uptown. Station 28 moved to a location at Westheimer Road at Sage in what is now Uptown in 1953. The station moved to Chimney Rock at Dolores in 1987. The station received a minor renovation in the fiscal year of 2006.

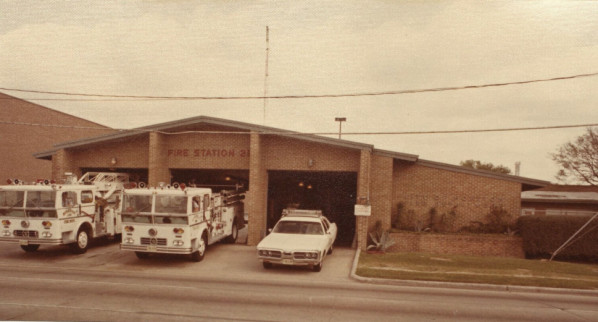
Fire Station 28, 1976

The neighborhood is served by the Houston Police Department's Midwest Patrol Division, headquartered in Greater Sharpstown.

Residents are a part of Houston City Council District G. In the first 1991 Mayor of Houston election most voters within and around Uptown voted for Bob Lanier.

The Uptown Management District is headquartered in Suite 1580 in 2 Post Oak Central at 1980 Post Oak Boulevard in the Post Oak Central complex.

=== County, state, and federal representation ===
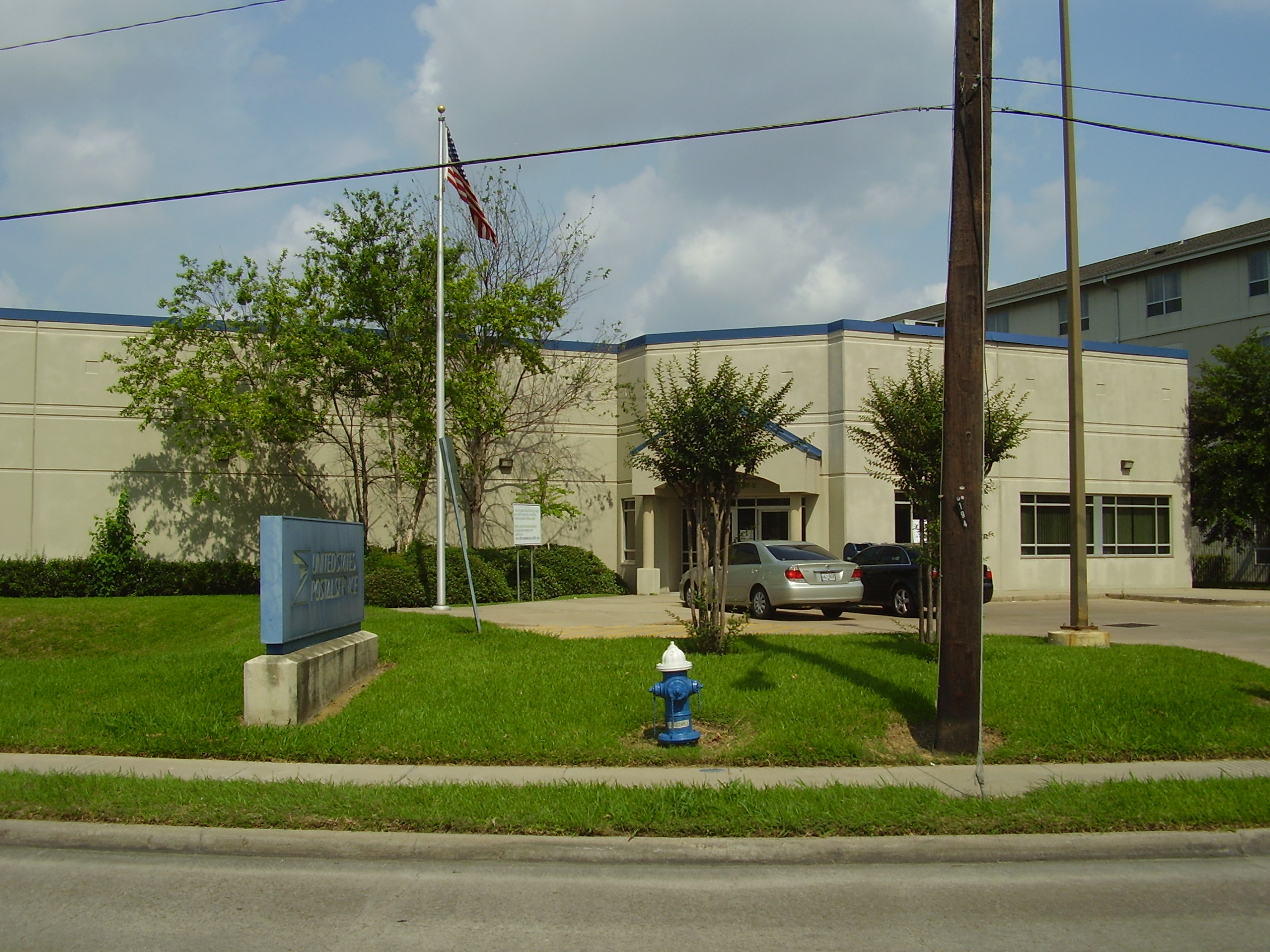
Sage Post Office

Uptown Houston is located in Texas's 7th congressional district and Harris County Precinct 3.

The United States Postal Service operates the Galleria Post Office in Suite 1200 at 5015 Westheimer Road, in Uptown Houston.

== Parks and recreation ==
The City of Houston announced in December 2008 that it would purchase the Williams Tower Park and Fountain from Hines REIT for approximately $8.5 million. The city will operate the site as a public park protecting the popular park and landmark waterwall fountain from the threat of future development. Hines and the city will share maintenance and upkeep costs of the park and fountain.

In addition the City of Houston operates the Post Oak Park at the intersection of Post Oak Drive and the 610 Loop.

In 2007 the city seized land from James and Jock Collins via eminent domain in order to widen San Felipe and convert the rest into a park. The city planned to build the Post Oak Lane Park, a 0.09-acre (0.036 ha) pocket park in Uptown. The pocket park is so small that it will not have a basketball court. City of Houston officials, including the Mayor of Houston Bill White and the Houston City Council, said that there was a public need for the park. The City of Houston operates the 4.7-acre (1.9 ha) Grady Park, which is located outside Uptown and two blocks away from the site of the Post Oak Lane Park.

According to Carolyn Feibel and Bradley Olson of the Houston Chronicle, the Houston Chronicle obtained documents that show that the city eminent domain helped Ed Wulfe, the developer of the BLVD Place complex adjacent to the park, complete a $12.5 million land sale related to the development. Wulfe was a major donor to White. As of December 2008 the city had not created any plans for the Post Oak Lane Park. Houston Parks and Recreation Director Joe Turner said in a sworn disposition in November 2008 that his department did not create the idea of the park and that he opposed the usage of eminent domain. The Collins brothers said that the city government had used eminent domain to seize land only for the purposes of private development, which is not legal in Texas.

On December 8, 2006, the Uptown District and the Texas Department of Transportation opened the Hidalgo Park, located south of the Galleria. The 3-acre (1.2 ha) park, previously a vacant plot of land, has 650 trees and shrubs and 240,000 square feet (22,000 m^{2}) of sod. The park includes a pond with a lighted fountain; the fountain was first activated on the day of the park's opening.

== Media ==
Prior to 1998, the Houston Press was located in Suite 1900 of the 2000 West Loop South building in Uptown. In 1998, it moved to a new location in Downtown Houston.

== Transportation ==
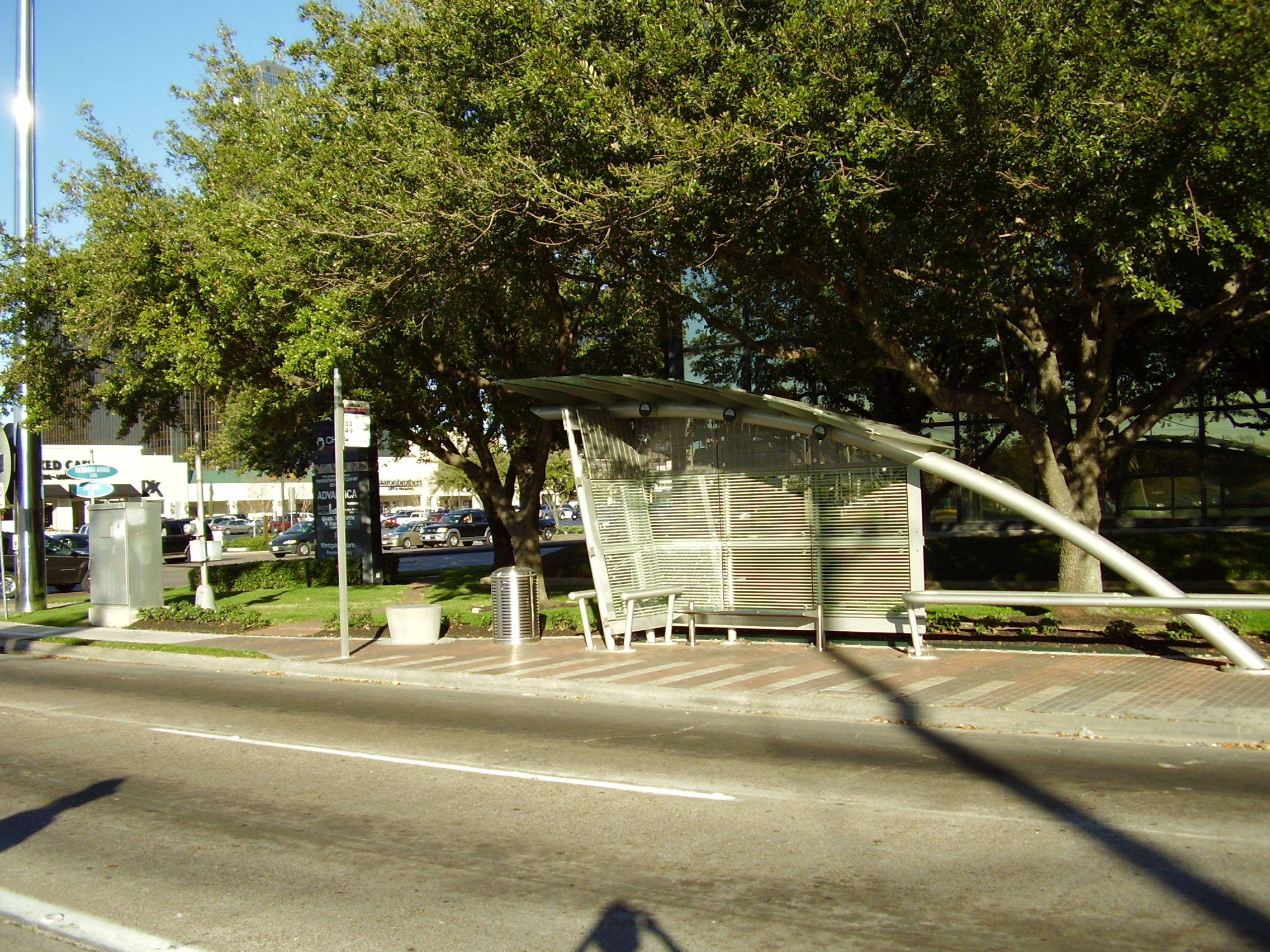
A METRO bus stop in Uptown Houston

=== Bus ===
The Metropolitan Transit Authority of Harris County, Texas, provides public bus service to Uptown. Bus routes that serve the Uptown area include:

Local routes

- 20 Canal/Memorial
- 25 Richmond
- 35 San Felipe
- 47 Hillcroft
- 49 Chimney Rock/South Post Oak
- 70 Memorial
- 82 Westheimer

=== Rapid transit ===
METRORail expansion plans include the Uptown/Gold Line which will serve the Uptown Houston area and run primarily down the median strip of Post Oak Boulevard. In 2010, Houston Mayor Annise Parker announced that there were no available funds to construct the rail line, although it still remains in METRO's future expansion plans. In 2013, it was announced that the line will be constructed initially as a bus rapid transit line, but with the capability to convert to light rail in the future. The bus rapid transit line could be functioning as early as 2017.

== Education ==
=== Public schools ===
Children living in Uptown are zoned to schools in the Houston Independent School District. The community is within Trustee District VII, represented by Harvin C. Moore as of 2008.

Uptown elementary school pupils located north of Westheimer Road are zoned to either Briargrove Elementary School (in Briargrove), while pupils located south of Westheimer Road are zoned to St. George Place Elementary School (in St. George Place). Residents of the Briargrove Elementary School attendance zone may apply for the Briarmeadow Charter School. Mark White Elementary School is scheduled to open in August 2016. Residents of the Briargrove Elementary zone, along with those of the Pilgrim, Piney Point, and Emerson zones, will be allowed to apply to this school.

Middle and high school pupils living in Uptown are zoned to Tanglewood Middle School (formerly Grady Middle School) and Margaret Long Wisdom High School (formerly Robert E. Lee High School) attendance boundaries, although students in the Lee attendance area may choose to attend Lamar High School or Westside High School.

==== Histories of schools ====
Grady Elementary opened in 1929 and moved to its present location in 1950. In 1979 it was no longer an elementary school. In 1992 it was converted into a middle school. When Westside opened in 2000, residents of the Lee attendance boundary gained the option to attend Westside instead of Lee, with no free transportation provided.

=== Private schools ===
St. Michael School, a K-8 Catholic school that is a part of the Archdiocese of Galveston-Houston, is in the area.

Al-Hadi School of Accelerative Learning, a private K–12 Islamic school, is in the area.

Two Catholic high schools, Strake Jesuit College Preparatory and Saint Agnes Academy, are located in Sharpstown, southwest of Uptown. Other nearby private schools include The Awty International School, St. John's School, and The Kinkaid School. The Awty school moved to 1615 Garrettson Street in Uptown in 1960. In moved to its current location in Spring Branch in 1979. As of 2019 The Village School in the Energy Corridor area has a bus service to an area along Westpark, via Royal Oaks Country Club. This stop serves students living in the Galleria area.

=== Public libraries ===
Houston Public Library operates the Jungman Neighborhood Library at 5830 Westheimer Road.

=== Colleges and universities ===
The Texas Legislature designated Houston Community College System (HCC) as serving Houston ISD (including Uptown).

The Houston Weekend College of Our Lady of the Lake University previously operated at the Art Institute of Houston in the Galleria area.

== See also ==
- List of leading shopping streets and districts by city
- Houston Galleria
- Four Oaks Place
- Post Oak Central
- Lakes on Post Oak
