= Cupertino Language Immersion Program =

Mandarin immersion program in California, U.S.

Cupertino Language Immersion Program (CLIP) is an alternative K-8 education program located at John Muir Elementary School (K-5) and Joaquin Miller Middle School (6-8) in the Cupertino Union School District (CUSD). CLIP is the oldest public Mandarin Immersion program in California and the second oldest in the country.

Employing a two-way language immersion model, CLIP’s goals are to develop biliteracy, enrich culturally and achieve academic proficiency that meet or exceed the district guidelines. It is one of four alternative programs in the district where enrollment is decided by lottery.

Starting in the 1998–1999 school year with a single kindergarten class, CLIP’s Mandarin Immersion Program has grown to expand through eighth grade in 2006. In 2007, the first class of immersion students graduated middle school. Starting in fall 2010, the middle school portion moved from Sam H. Lawson Middle School to Joaquin Miller Middle School. Starting in fall 2022, the elementary school portion moved from R. I. Meyerholz Elementary School to John Muir Elementary School. The district has also prioritized giving CLIP its own distinctive campus in the future.

CUSD supports CLIP with teachers, facilities, and English curriculum. All aspects of the Mandarin curriculum are financed by grants and donations. Donations are routed through the CLIP Community Organization (CLIPCO), a non-profit fundraising organization.

== Milestones ==
- March, 1998: Presentation to CUSD trustees.
- May 12, 1998: CUSD Trustees approve language program.
- August, 1998: Pilot Mandarin enrichment program, 10% of school day at L.P. Collins Elementary School.
- August, 1999: Expanded to two-way Mandarin immersion.
- 2003: Received US Department of Education Grant $500k over 2003-06.
- August, 2004: Relocated to R.I. Meyerholz Elementary School.
- August, 2006: Expanded to Sam H. Lawson Middle School.
- June, 2007: First language immersion class graduates Sam H. Lawson Middle School.

== Organizational structure ==
- CLIP Program Director coordinates with the School Site Principal and District CLIP Advisory Committee (DCAC), as well as updating the School's CLIP Advisory Committee (CAC). The Director develops and oversees execution of the CLIP strategic plan.
- The School Principal coordinates with the School's Parent Teacher Association (PTA), School Site Council (SSC), and School CAC.
- The DCAC Coordinates with the School CAC(s) and in turn submits budgets to CLIPCO for fundraising. CLIP Advisory Committees constitute a group of teachers, administrators, and parent representatives charged with advising on the implementation of the CLIP strategic plan.

== Academics ==
=== Curriculum ===
Delivered in both Mandarin and English, CLIP students receive the same curriculum as all CUSD students. The program integrates both native English speakers and native Chinese speakers to achieve a language balance for 2-way language immersion.
Instructional time during the day is split between English and Chinese as follows: kindergarten and first grade students receive 70% Mandarin/30% English instruction; second and third grade students receive 60%/40% Mandarin/English instruction; fourth and fifth grade students receive 50%/50% Mandarin/English instruction. Middle school students receive 30% Mandarin/70% English instruction - they take two periods each day in Mandarin and five periods in English.

CLIP students are a part of their host school's student body and participate in school-wide activities and events. Middle School CLIP students at Miller Middle School are required to attend 2 school periods in Mandarin. To fulfill this requirement, students must attend an early morning "0 period" and surrender an elective period.

=== Teachers ===
CLIP teachers consists of English teachers, with Multiple Subject Credential with emphasis on Cross-cultural, Language and Academic Development (CLAD) credentials and Mandarin and bilingual teachers with Multiple Subject credential with Bilingual, Cross-cultural, Language and Academic Development (BCLAD) certification in addition to the California required subject certification. Teachers visit other bilingual schools in the Bay Area. CLIP has also provided additional professional development and training by Dr. Ji-Mei Chang, professor at San Jose State University and consultant to CLIP.

=== Assessment ===
- California Standardized Testing and Reporting (STAR).
- California English Language Development Test (CELDT).
- Standards-based Measurement of Proficiency. This test determines placement level for students continuing into the Fremont Union High School District (FUHSD). Four levels are available in which the fourth level is Advanced Placement (AP), in preparation for the AP Chinese Exam.
- Program Evaluator: Dr. Kathryn Lindholm-Leary. Findings are not available to the public per agreement with CUSD.

== Cultural enrichment ==
- CLIP After School Enrichment Program (ASEP) is a parent organized and participant funded program to provide cultural enrichment classes to Meyerholz Elementary School students. Starting in Fall, 2006, classes offered include Chinese Wushu (sport), Chinese flute, erhu, dance, Chinese calligraphy, Chinese brush painting, and Lion dance.
- San Francisco Chinese New Year Festival and Parade: Since 2004, Meyerholz Elementary School has participated in the parade. Meyerholz was awarded 2nd place in the school marching category in 2008. The school was awarded 1st place in 2012 and 2013.
- Middle school student exchange program with school in Cupertino's sister city of Hsinchu, Taiwan
- Chinese Language Contest: Held annually, students elect to participate in a language contest where winners advance to regional competitions organized by the Association of Northern California Chinese Schools (ANCCS). Categories include speech, read-aloud, reading comprehension, penmanship, and bilingual translation.

== Opposition ==
Opponents of CLIP have voiced the following concerns:

- Funding: During proposals for implementation of CLIP, opponents urged the school board to instead fund other much needed "programs and services including music and arts."
- Ethnic Bias: Concern was voiced that proposals were ethnically motivated and would only serve a minority of the population.
- Santa Clara Grand Jury Inquiry: As a result of citizens' complaints about CLIP funding, a Grand Jury inquired into the practices of the CUSD. No recommendations were made.

== See also ==
- Shuang Wen School – English-Chinese K-8 school in New York City
- Mandarin Immersion Magnet School – English-Chinese K-8 school in Houston, Texas
- Pioneer Valley Chinese Immersion Charter School – K-12 English-Chinese charter school in Hadley, Massachusetts
