= Dalian No. 24 High School =

Location
- 217 Jiefang Road, Zhongshan District

Information
- Type: Public
- Motto: Virtue (明德)，Focus (笃志)，Erudition (博学)，Caution (慎行)
- Established: 1949
- Principal: Tian Jukun (田巨坤)
- Staff: 123
- Enrollment: over 1500
- Campus: 29,440 square metres (7.27 acres)
- Information: 0411-82307507
- Website: dlhs24.com.cn

Dalian No. 24 High School (Chinese: 大连市第二十四中学; pinyin: Dàlián Shì dì Èrshísì Zhōngxué or 大连第24中学) is a public high school in Dalian, Liaoning province, China. It has a great reputation around Northeastern China and is highly ranked among all high schools in China also the best one in Dalian. It was known as the "Small Tsinghua in Northeastern China". It has a reputation for encouraging students to develop leadership skills and having a less pressing studying environment. The school is also keenly supported by the Dalian Municipal Education Bureau.

== School Badge ==
Dalian No. 24 High School’s badge consists of three colored ribbons. They are in blue, red and yellow, respectively representing dignity, enthusiasm, and vitality. The three colored ribbons are in three directions. In a clockwise rotation, it symbols transcendent students from various middle schools gather in Dalian No. 24 High School, a place to strive for their dreams. In an anticlockwise rotation, three ribbons mean students who graduate from Dalian NO. 24 High School are capable of building up their reputations in numerous domains.

== History ==
The official establishment of Dalian No. 24 Middle School was in September 1958, and its history can be traced back to the Dalian No. 5 Ordinary Primary School established by the Japanese during the Japanese occupation in 1920. In 1920, Dalian Fifth Ordinary Primary School was established. In 1925, it was renamed Dalian Chunri Primary School. In 1941, it was renamed Dalian Chunri National School. In 1946, Japan surrendered and withdrew from Dalian, becoming the seventh school of Dalian Japanese Overseas Elementary School. In 1949, it was renamed as Yucai School (the then principal was Mao Daxun, the first secretary of the Municipal Party Committee of Lvda City, and the first education director was Yang Kaiying, the cousin of Yang Kaihui). In 1951, Dalian Fourth Middle School was established. In 1956, Yucai School merged with Dalian Fourth Middle School, and the school name was used as Dalian Fourth Middle School. In 1960, it was renamed Dalian 24th Middle School. In 1962, it was designated as a key high school in Liaoning Province. In 2004, the school was rated as a demonstration high school in Liaoning Province

== International Department ==
The International Department is a part of Dalian No.24 High School established in July, 2011. The international department provides Cambridge IGCSE and A-Level courses. In 2011, Dalian No.24 High School becomes CIE Exam Centre (CN572). Peter Chai (柴思原), currently a researcher and writer, graduated from the International Department with the highest grade in A-Level Business Studies in China in 2017.

== Domestic Department-Admission Rates to Chinese Key Universities in the National Higher Education Entrance Examination ==
In the three consecutive years from 2015 to 2017, Dalian No. 24 high school’s admission rates to Tsinghua University and Peking University, both in China, ranked first in Liaoning Province.

In 2015, three hundred and seventy-five graduates took part in the National Higher Education Entrance Examination. In total thirty-eight graduates were admitted to Tsinghua University and Peking University.

In 2016, a total of forty-four graduates are admitted to Tsinghua University and Peking University and two graduates were admitted to University of Hong Kong. Students who were admitted by these three universities occupied ten percent of the whole graduates.

In 2017, a total of thirty-nine graduates were admitted to Tsinghua University and Peking University in China, approximately nine percent of the whole graduates.

== Competitions in Five Disciplines ==
Dalian No. 24 high school has laid emphasis on cultivating students’ potentials and provided training courses for the competition in five disciplines, covering Physics, Biology, Math, Chemistry and Computer domains. Students who participate in these courses have made remarkable achievements in these five types of competitions.

== Light Show ==
Before the approach of National Higher Education Entrance Examination every year, a light show will be displayed by 10th and 11th grade students and organized by No. 24 Students’ Union. The aim of the light show is to encourage 12th students of Dalian No. 24 High school to work to their best of abilities in the National Higher Education Entrance Examination. Students from Junior grades, by turning on and off the lights periodically in the classrooms, present different patterns with different meanings. Two hosts from the No. 24 campus radio will give the corresponding commentary in order to combine with the whole light effect of different patterns. Different years have different patterns along with different commentaries. Moreover, the designation of patterns is all originally created by No 24 students. In 2016, the light show was given a video webcast by Dalian No 24 campus TV station for the first time and online viewers were about 10 thousand people.

== Sister School ==
Lamar High School in Houston, Texas, United States has been No. 24's sister school since 2000. Dalian is one of Houston's sister cities.

== International Exchange ==
Dalian No.24 high school has established relationships with high schools at home and abroad, including Lamar High School of the United States, Colo High School of Australia, St. Bees School of UK, Hwa Chong Institution of Singapore, St. Paul’s Co-educational College of Hong Kong, Ritsumeikan Uji Senior High School of Japan, Taipei Municipal Fuxing Senior High School of Taiwan, High School attached to Tsinghua University of China, High School Affiliated to Renmin University of China, Liaoning Province Shiyan High School, and Northeast Yucai school.
