= Larchmont, Houston =

Neighborhood in Houston, Texas

Coordinates: 29.7469°N 95.4353°W

Larchmont is a neighborhood of single family residences located in Houston (Texas, USA). It is located between Richmond Avenue and Interstate 69/U.S. Route 59 (Southwest Freeway).

Originally built in the mid-1950s, by 2003 the existing single story ranch style homes have begun to be replaced by new construction 2 story homes. The neighborhood is bordered by Richmond Avenue, Chimney Rock, the Southwest Freeway, and South Rice. Larchmont is located very close to major shopping and business centers such as The Galleria and Greenway Plaza, and is approximately 6 miles (9.7 km) from downtown Houston.

As of 1997 several streets that used to have through traffic are now dead-ended at Chimney Rock.

== Education ==
=== Public schools ===
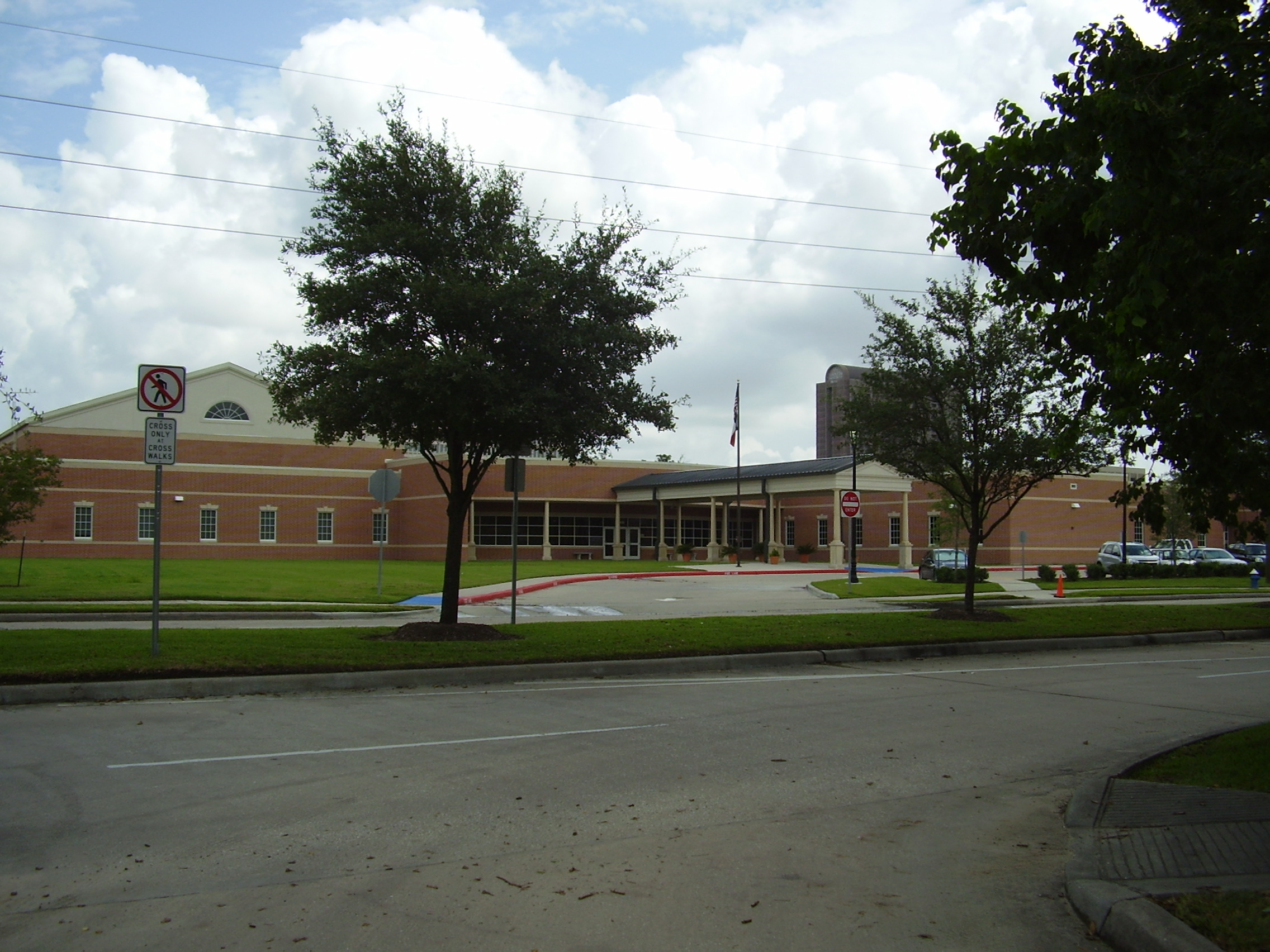
St. George Place Elementary School

Larchmont is served by the Houston Independent School District. Larchmont is zoned to St. George Place Elementary School, a school which first opened for the 2007 - 2008 school year. The attendance zone was adjusted at that time to include children living in St. George Place, Afton Oaks, and Larchmont.

Larchmont middle school children are zoned to Tanglewood Middle School (formerly Grady Middle School).

Larchmont high school students are zoned to Margaret Long Wisdom High School (formerly Lee High) and may choose to attend Lamar High School or Westside High School.

=== Public libraries ===
The closest library is the Jungman Branch of the Houston Public Library.

== See also ==
The Larchmont Civic Association maintains a website here. Also available is the Larchmont email list for residents on Google Groups.
