= History of the Hmong in California =

The Hmong population in California is the largest in the United States. Most fled to the United States as refugees in the late 1970s due to their cooperation with the Central Intelligence Agency operatives in northern Laos during the Vietnam War, or are a descendant.

As of 2017 it has about 100,000 people of Hmong ancestry.

== History ==
Vang Pao was venerated as a leader by the large Hmong refugee populations who immigrated to the United States when the communists seized power in Laos. Arriving in 1975, Vang Pao originally settled in Montana but moved to Southern California. In the 1980s and 1990s, many Hmong moved to California due to his presence. Arriving from many states including Minnesota, Oregon, and Wisconsin, some tried farming in the Central Valley. Many Hmong who arrived in California decided not to farm due to a lack of capital, English skills, and overall education; the lack of English meant they were unable to develop the required marketing and technological skills to succeed in farming in the United States.

In the 2010s Hmong from the Central Valley and from other parts of the United States began moving to Northern California, with several coming to farming marijuana. By 2017 Siskiyou County officials stated opposition to the influx of Hmong marijuana farmers, stating that many of them were farming in manners against California law. Evacuation efforts were complicated for the Lava Fire in 2021 by the ongoing tensions between local authorities and the Hmong communities that operate cannabis farms in the area. One man was shot and killed by police after brandishing a firearm at authorities while "defending his farm". Additionally, 14 people were arrested in the Mount Shasta Vista subdivision after refusing to leave amid the evacuation order. By 2017, according to Thomas Fuller of The New York Times, " in Trinity, Hmong are gaining acceptance."

== Demographics ==
As of 1999 and 2000 California has the largest Hmong population in the United States by state. As of the 2000 U.S. census the state had 71,471 ethnic Hmong. As of 2010, there are 91,244 Hmong Americans in California, 0.3% of the state's population.

As of around 2013, 16% of California Hmong owned their houses.

== Economy ==
Due to the state's higher living expenses, a Hmong median income of around $25,000, the fact that over half of the state's Hmong are on public assistance, and competition for social services and unskilled jobs, as of around 2013 Mai Na Lee, the author of an encyclopedia article titled "Hmong of Minnesota and California," concluded that Hmong in California had lower economic success compared to Hmong of other states. California has higher living expenses than other states, and therefore compared to other states it is more difficult to purchase an automobile, maintain a certain standard of living, or establish a business. The California Hmong median income that was half of the median income of an average California household.

Some Hmong families in the Central Valley grow vegetables to sell at farmer's markets and to Hmong communities in other parts of the United States. Compared to Hmong in other U.S. states, as of 2013 California Hmong had less of a likelihood to take manufacturing jobs. Compared to Hmong in other states, California Hmong had a higher likelihood of having lower-paid jobs in management, sales, service, and office positions.

== Politics ==
As of around 2013 Mai Na Lee argued that compared to Hmong in other states, the Hmong in California had fewer political accomplishments.

The first Hmong elected to a political office in the state was Tony Vang, who became a Fresno Unified School District board member after a 2002 election. The Fresno Hmong had advocated for California bill AB78 which established a requirement for Southeast Asian history education in the California school system; this bill passed in 2003. The first Hmong in the state elected to a California city council was Blong Xiong, who was elected to the Fresno city council in 2006.

== Geography ==
As of 2000 the majority of the Hmong in California were in the Central Valley region. An area ranging from Fresno to Chico contains the bulk of the California Hmong. The two largest Hmong populations in the state are in Fresno and Sacramento, and other cities with Hmong included Merced and Stockton. As of 2000 there were 24,442 Hmong in Fresno and 18,121 Hmong in Sacramento, giving those cities the second and third largest Hmong populations of any U.S. city.

From early 2015 to 2017 about 1,500 Hmong farmers came to Siskiyou County, California for the marijuana business. By 2017 about 1,000 Hmong came to the Trinity Alps area to farm marijuana, and that year about 1,500 Hmong lived in Trinity County. By late 2016 about 33% of the land parcels at Mount Shasta Vista were owned by people with Hmong family names.

== Education ==
As of around 2013 Mai Na Lee stated that, of all Asian ethnic groups in California, the Hmong had the lowest educational attainment. In addition, compared to Hmong in other states, the Hmong in California had fewer educational accomplishments. As of the 2010 U.S. census, 7% of Hmong had a bachelor's degree and higher qualifications and over 50% had not achieved a high school diploma.

Mai Na Lee stated that the California public may incorrectly perceive Hmong as conforming to the model minority stereotype.

=== Primary and secondary education ===
In 2002, the State of California counted about 35,000 students of Hmong descent in schools. According to Jay Schenirer, a member of the school board of the Sacramento City Unified School District, most of the students resided in the Central Valley, in an area ranging from Fresno to Marysville. Fresno County and Sacramento County combined have almost 12,000 Hmong students. Hmong language speakers were the third largest English as a second language group in California schools in the 1995-2005 period. As of 2010 there were about 30,000 students of Hmong descent. The Sacramento City USD and the Fresno Unified School District have large numbers of Hmong students.

As of 2002, of the Hmong students who took the California English Language Development Test, which measures English fluency in students who are learning English, 15% of Hmong scores at the "advanced" or "early advanced" classifications, while 30% of Vietnamese English learning students and 21% of all of California's over 1.5 million English learning students scored at those levels. Suanna Gilman-Ponce, the multilingual education department head of Sacramento City Unified, said that the Hmong students had lower rates due to having parents who spoke little English; therefore they entered American schools with few English skills. In addition their culture was not literate, so Hmong history was not written down and history books did not discuss Hmong history.

In 2011, Susan B. Anthony Elementary School in Sacramento established a Hmong-language immersion program. It is the only Hmong immersion program in a California public school, and is one of two Hmong immersion school programs in the United States.

By 2017 the influx of Hmong in northern California gave those communities their first visible minority groups; that year the 280 student Mountain Valley Unified School District had 30 Hmong students. Superintendent Debbie Miller stated that the influx of Hmong had reversed a previous trend of enrollment decline and that the district administration wishes for more Hmong to move to the district. She added that "We’ve scrambled to figure out how we can incorporate their traditions."

== See also ==
- The Spirit Catches You and You Fall Down
- Hmong American

== Notes ==
- Some content originates from Hmong Americans
