= Lamar High School (Houston) =

American public high school

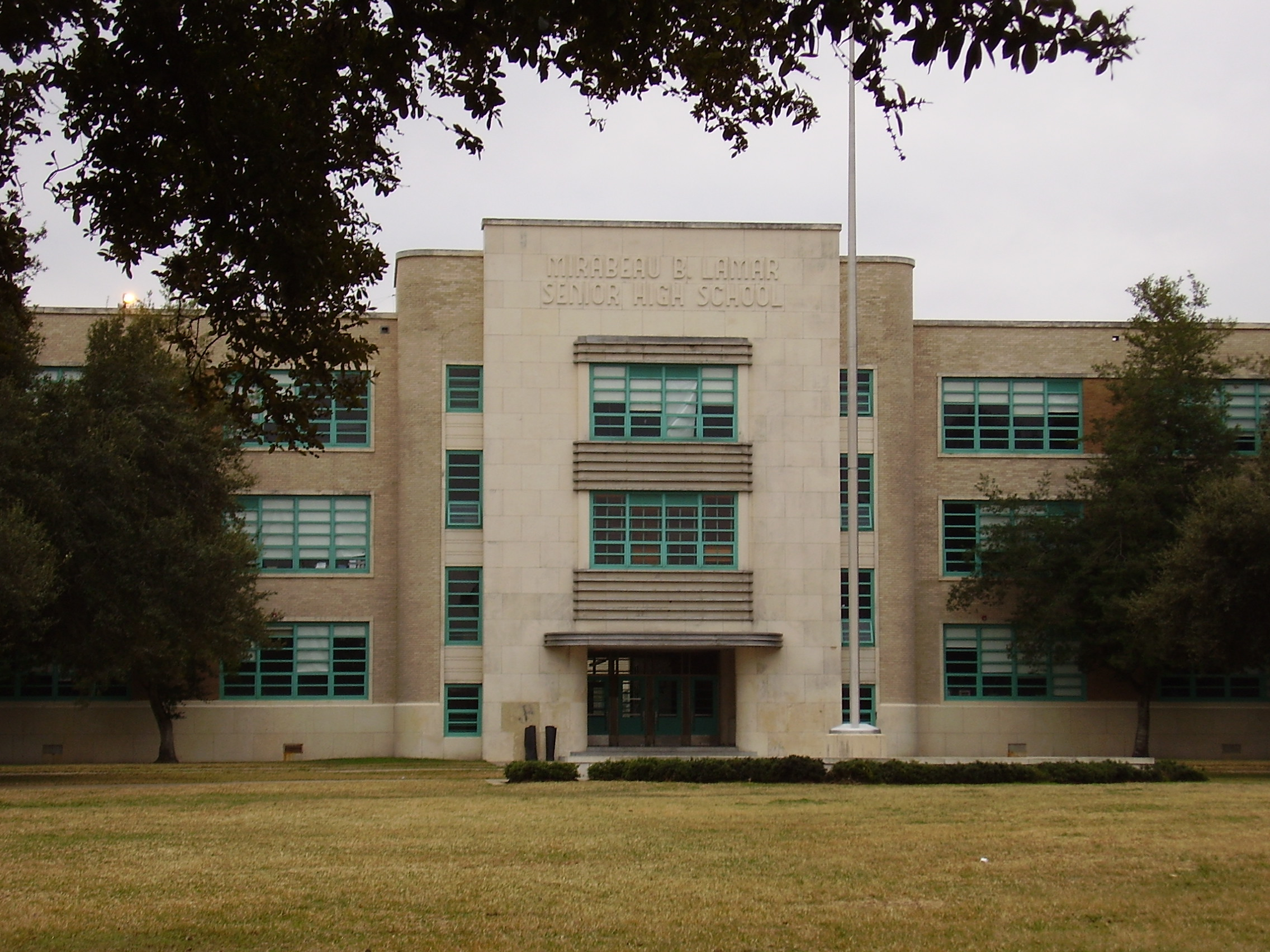

Location
- 3325 Westheimer Road; Houston, Texas 77098; United States; 29.74074°N 95.42655°W

Information
- Type: Public
- Motto: French: Va t'en aux étoiles (Reach for the Stars)
- Established: 1936
- School district: Houston Independent School District (Houston ISD)
- Principal: Rita Graves
- Teaching staff: 156.74 (FTE)
- Grades: 9–12
- Enrollment: 3,078 (2023-2024)
- Student to teacher ratio: 19.64
- Campus: Urban
- Colors: Red, Blue, White
- Athletics conference: University Interscholastic League (UIL)
- Mascot: Texans
- Newspaper: Lamar Life
- Yearbook: Orenda
- Communities served: West University Place, most of Southside Place, various neighborhoods in Houston; Wisdom zone w/ Lamar option: Parts of Houston, small sections of Hunters Creek Village and Piney Point Village
- Feeder schools: Baker Montessori School (K-8); Gregory-Lincoln Education Center (K-8); Wharton Dual Language Academy (K-8); Lanier Middle School; Pershing Middle School; Poe Elementary School; River Oaks Elementary School; Others listed below
- Website: Lamar's Home Page

Lamar High School is a comprehensive public secondary school located in Houston, Texas, United States. It is a part of the Houston Independent School District (HISD). Lamar High School, was established in 1936 in memory of Mirabeau B. Lamar (1798–1859), a leader in the Texas Revolution and the second President of the Republic of Texas. Lamar has a four-year program, serving grades 9 through 12.

The school is located in the Upper Kirby district, serving the Houston neighborhoods of River Oaks and Montrose, the incorporated city of West University Place, a portion of the city of Southside Place, and other Houston subdivisions. Lamar offers neighborhood, Advanced Placement, and IB Diploma (International Baccalaureate) programs. It also hosts a business magnet program offering business management courses that works in conjuncture with the Houston business community to provide internships and university scholarships. Lamar's IB Diploma programs is one of six in HISD, and consistently graduates the largest number of IB Diploma diploma candidates in Texas.

== History ==
=== Founding and early history ===
In the 19th century Michael Louis Westheimer, a German immigrant who arrived in Houston in 1859, bought a 640-acre (2.6 km^{2}) farm at an auction for $2.50 per acre. On his property Westheimer established a school for local children, including some of his relatives from Germany. The path to the school became "Westheimer's Road," now called Westheimer Road.

The Houston Independent School District built and established Lamar on the former site of Westheimer's farm. Earlier the Southampton Civic Club attempted to persuade Houston ISD to build Lamar at a lot along Kirby Drive and West Alabama Ave.; the attempt failed and Lamar was built across from River Oaks Boulevard.

Lamar officially opened in 1937 as "Southwest High School" along Westheimer Road before changing its name soon after. The opening relieved pressure on San Jacinto High School in what is now Midtown. When the school opened it had 1,310 students, mostly from Bellaire, West University Place, Montrose, Southampton, and Southgate. In 1938 10% of the students resided in River Oaks.

William Broyles of the Texas Monthly wrote that in its pre-desegregation history Lamar was the public equivalent of an exclusive prep school and Houston's "society school". In that period Lamar was the designation of children of Houston's most prominent families who attended public high schools. Many students in the 1950s had referred to River Oaks Boulevard as the only street with a country club at both ends: one being the River Oaks Country Club, and the "other" was Lamar High School. Gregory Curtis of the Texas Monthly wrote that "Lamar has always had a reputation as a school of snobs" within Houston's public school system.

Lamar grew rapidly to the point where Robert E. Lee High School (now Margaret Long Wisdom High School) was built in 1962 to relieve Lamar. After its opening, Lee became Lamar's primary athletic rival.

=== Integration and IB era ===
Lamar racially integrated in the 1970s. Broyles wrote that Lamar integrated quietly and "not so much as an experiment in integration but simply as a school, a place where adolescents learn many things, some of them in the classroom." Due to integration many of the wealthier families instead sent their children to private schools.

Lamar became an IB school in 1982 and this program would later be complemented by the Business Administration Magnet Program established in 1989. In 1987 the school had held its 50th anniversary. It had sent invitations to Tommy Tune, Robert Foxworth, Jaclyn Smith, Tommy Sands, Carlin Glynn, Paula Prentiss, and Candy Tovar, all Lamar graduates. The festivities included appearances from Mayor of Houston Kathy Whitmire, Lamar alum and former Governor of Texas Mark White, Lamar alum and former Mayor of Houston Fred Hofheinz, Superintendent of HISD Joan Raymond, and others who were scheduled to give special presentations.

In September 1991 Lamar was one of 32 HISD schools that had capped enrollments: The school was at capacity and excess students had to attend other schools. Fran Callahan, a resident of the Old Braeswood neighborhood of Houston, founded the Lamar Alumni Association in 1998 and became its executive director. She decided to create an alumni association after she inquired about making a large-scale fundraising campaign and learned that Lamar, which had many famous individuals as alumni, had no alumni association.

In 2003 the class of 1953, which included business owners, a film producer, a Nobel prize winner, a nominee for U.S. Secretary of State and a former assistant of the U.S. Secretary of Defense, lawyers, engineers, and an architect, held its 50th reunion. A tour of the Lamar campus and a formal buffet and dance at the Houston Country Club was scheduled for Saturday, November 8, 2003. A brunch was scheduled at the University Club in the morning of Sunday, November 9, 2003. In 2004, Tune performed at Lamar. Foxworth and Jaclyn Smith attended the performance.

=== Expansion of facilities and renovation ===
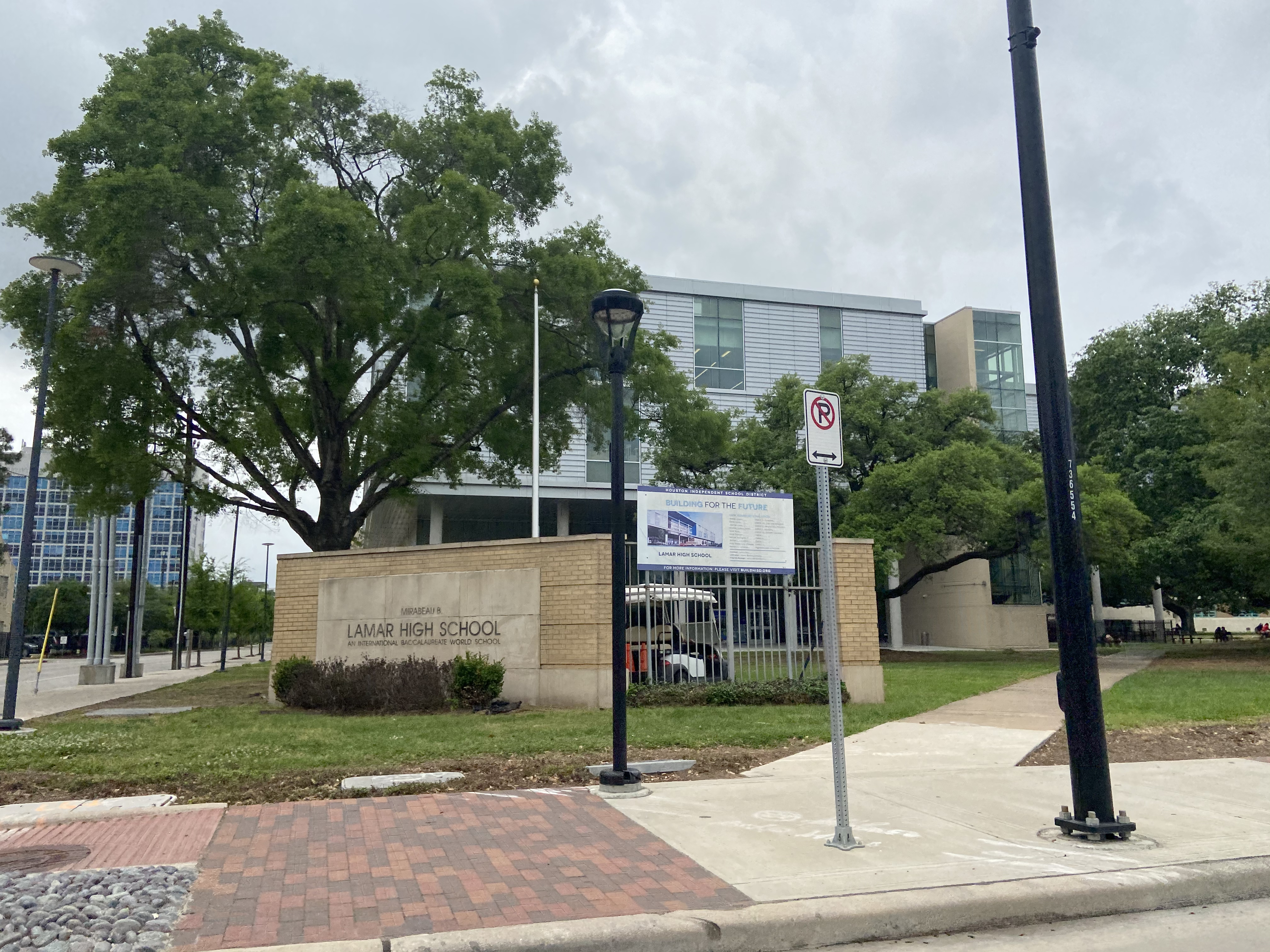
Completed addition

The 2000s would bring speculation about Lamar's overcrowding and new attention to the school's need for new facilities. In 2007, 22% of high-school-age children zoned to Lamar chose to attend a different Houston ISD school. In 2010 Lamar, which has a capacity of 2,525, was 740 students over capacity. In 2010 Magnet Schools of America, a nonprofit, released a report recommending that Lamar's magnet program be abolished, due to overcrowding. In 2014 Terry Grier stated that Lamar should reduce its enrollment to around 3,000 students.

Rita Graves, previously principal at Roberts Elementary and Pin Oak Middle School, became the principal of Lamar in August 2018 arriving as the transition to the construction of the new building began.

In 2018, the HISD Bond project announced a $108 million construction and renovation plan for the building. The plan includes major renovations to the existing historically significant portions of the north building and an entirely new classroom and instructional facility. As of 2019 the construction is near completion.

== Campus ==
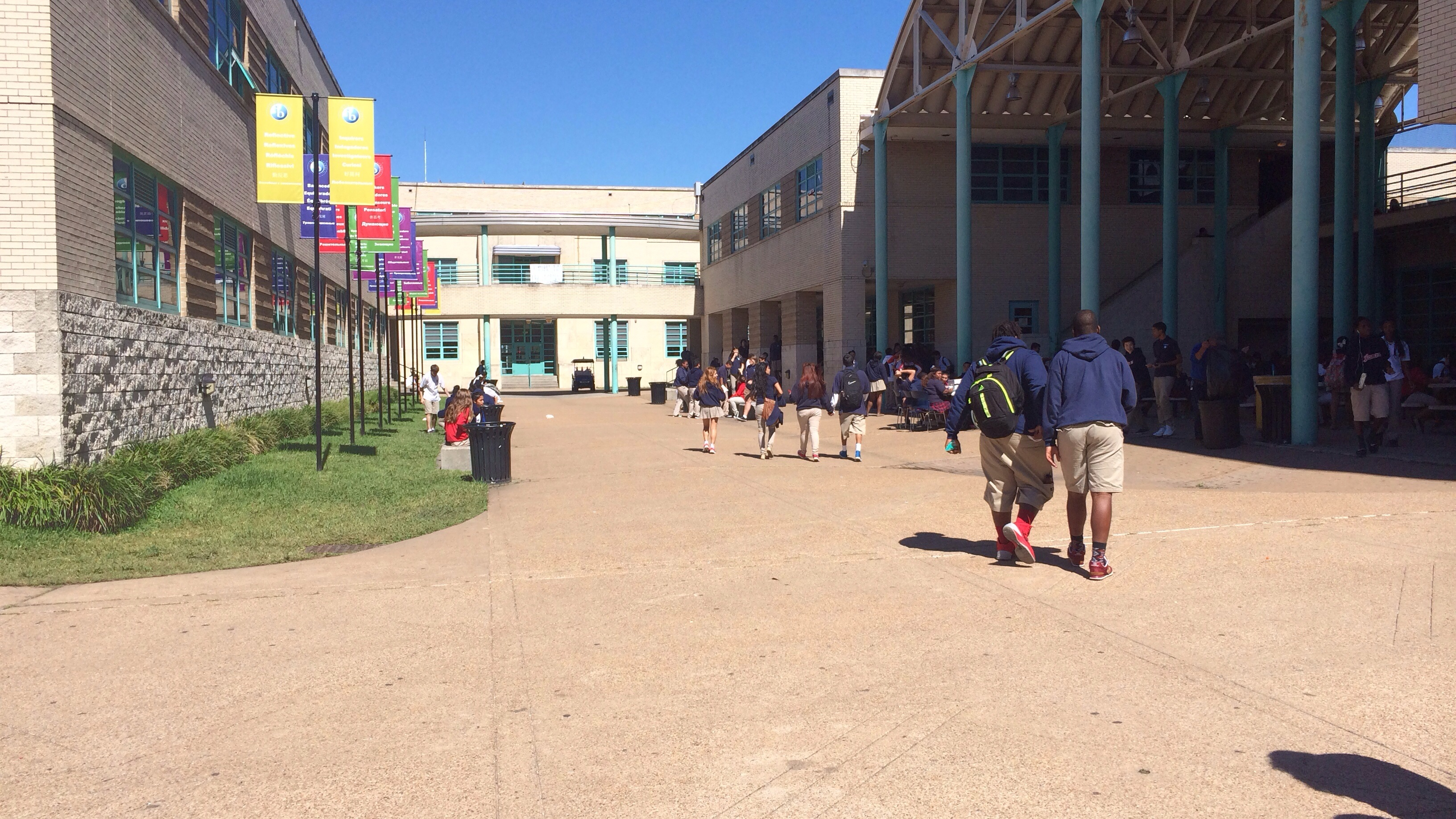
Courtyard of Lamar High School. Lamar students wearing school uniforms are visible in this picture.

Entrance to the Lamar JROTC Building

The campus is located on the southern end of River Oaks Boulevard. The Lamar High School campus consists of four buildings, a baseball field, a football field, and tennis courts.

The North Building is a four-story building (including the basement level) which was the original building built in 1936. It consists of many classrooms, the main office, attendance office, magnet office, International Baccalaureate office, special education office, auditorium, band room, cooking room, and the choir room. It was built in a distinctive Art Deco style. The building was made of Texas limestone and the windows are the steel ribbon style. It consists of a single central block with the Ned S. Holmes Auditorium at the western end. The entrance to the theater is decorated by a relief map of Texas that indicates the state's mountain ranges and escarpment John F. Staub and Kenneth Franzheim designed it, while Lamar Q. Cato, Louis A. Glover, and Harry D. Payne assisted. An Italian American, Eraclito "Nino" Lenarduzzi, designed the map on the auditorium. Anna Mod, author of Building Modern Houston, wrote that the theater entrance uses "a more monumental and severe Moderne style".

The current addition began construction in 2017 and opened in 2020, with classrooms divided into eight "neighborhoods" a.k.a. "cohorts" and a snack bar which students may use at any time. This is in lieu of a central cafeteria. The addition has an atmosphere of a corporate work environment.

In 2012 Greg Groogan of KRIV noted that the campus, prior to the late 2010s renovation, had experienced disrepair. The school at the time had insufficient facilities for its now larger student body. The 2019 renovation brought the destruction of the West and East buildings that served Lamar since the 1980s. The new instructional building on Babel Street include completely redone educational facilities and premier sports facilities.Lamar HS construction plans focus on facilitating new instructional model

The school has a large map of Texas on the wall of the performance hall. In 2012 Richard Connelly of the Houston Press ranked Lamar as the seventh most architecturally beautiful high school campus in Greater Houston, saying that it is "[d]efinitely one of the most distinctive schools in town."

=== Architectural style ===
John F. Staub and Kenneth Franzheim, two architects, designed Lamar's original buildings with Louis A. Glover, Lamar Q. Cato, and Harry D. Payne. The design uses a "Z-plan" which has the auditorium and shop wings on opposite ends of the academic block. Jay C. Henry, the author of Architecture in Texas: 1895-1945, write that the construction had "a more avant-garde expression."

=== Research center ===
In 2010 the school announced that it would replace its traditional school library with a coffee bar and electronic research center. The coffee bar is operated by LHS's culinary program.

=== As a filming location ===
The school is seen in the movie Rushmore. In Rushmore the campus is used as the setting for Grover Cleveland High School. Richard Connelly of the Houston Press said that the Lamar building "was ghetto'd up to look like a dilapidated inner-city school." The school was also featured in the Chuck Norris film: Sidekicks.

Lamar's 50th anniversary time capsule

=== 50th anniversary time capsule ===
On October 17, 1987, Lamar High School and its students celebrated its 50th anniversary by creating a time capsule to teach the students in the future how high school life was like in the 1980s. The time capsule was buried in front of Lamar's main entrance where it lies today. The plaque that marks where the time capsule lies is made from marble donated by the community of River Oaks and fundraising events held at Lamar at the time.

The plaque of Lamar's time capsule reads...

Lamar High School

Fiftieth Anniversary Time Capsule

HEREIN LIES MEMENTOS SELECTED BY STUDENTS AND GRADUATES OF LAMAR HIGH SCHOOL IN COMMEMORATION OF THE FIFTIETH ANNIVERSARY, SEALED ON OCTOBER 17TH, 1987. THE CAPSULE IS TO BE OPENED ON THE 50th ANNIVERSARY, THE YEAR 2037

=== 2019 New Campus ===
In 2017, ground was broken for the building of a new $108 million state-of-the-art campus. Construction is expected to be completed in 2019 and will preserve the significant architectural building structures of the old campus.

== Demographics ==
Lamar High ethnic breakdown 2022-23
1. White (22.8%)
2. Hispanic (40.5%)
3. Black (27.8%)
4. Asian/Pacific Islander (5.30%)
5. American Indian or Alaskan (0.30%)
6. Two or more (3.20%)

For the 2022–23 school year:

- African American: 27.8%
- Hispanic: 40.5%
- White: 22.8%
- American Indian: 0.3%
- Asian: 5.3%
- Pacific Islander: 0.1%
- Two or More Races: 3.2%
- Economically Disadvantaged: 49.3%

In 2016 about 60% of the students attending Lamar live outside of the Lamar attendance boundary.

In 2018 more than 50% of the student body was considered to be at risk of becoming school dropouts.

=== Historical demographics ===
In the Lamar's early history, students were segregated into different schools by race. In 1967 the school had 2,040 students. Until 1970 HISD categorized Hispanic students as being White, so Jay P. Childers, author of The Evolving Citizen: American Youth and the Changing Norms of Democratic Engagement, wrote that in terms of ethnic ratios, "Exact numbers for the late 1960s are impossible to calculate" for that reason. As evidence that non-Hispanic White students were the vast majority at that time, he used images from the school newspaper, The Lancer.

Childers wrote that ethnic change "seemed" to have quickly occurred after desegregation, citing the fact that in Spring 1974 African Americans made up six of twelve of the class officers and that in 1972 the cover of one issue of the Lancer showed a black male. Curtis wrote that the racial integration did not cause "unfortunate incidents" at the school. In 1975 there were 1,900 students. Due to the outflow of the very wealthy the school was increasingly made up of middle-class students, and some students were of lower income backgrounds: 100 of them rented their own apartments.

As of 1975 about 33% of Lamar's students were black. Many black parents sent their children to Lamar because of the school's strong academic reputation. By 1975 black students became members of clubs and the cheerleader corps of Lamar, and the student council president and "Lady of Lamar" was black. Curtis wrote that black students who did not wish to associate with whites often did not participate in the social environment while whites who did not wish to associate with blacks were still able to participate in that environment. Some black students emphasized with friends attending other schools who criticized them for going to Lamar that they only attended the school. Curtis wrote that some Lamar white students felt that "going to school with blacks [was] a duty they must perform, a quirk of history they must indulge."

In 2006 Lisa Viator from the Houston Chronicle stated that between the 1950s and 2006 the school had transitioned from "an exclusive suburban institution" to a multiethnic urban high school. As of 2010 the Lamar campus was built to accommodate 2,525 students but housed an additional 740 students as of the 2010–2011 school year. It is one of the most popular high schools for transferring in HISD and is one of the most ethnically diverse in the city.

== Academics and student performance ==
In 2008 William G. Ouchi, author of Making Schools Work: A Revolutionary Plan to Get Your Children the Education They Need, stated that Lamar was one of the two "elite" public high schools in Houston along with Bellaire High School. In 1979, Al Reinert of Texas Monthly stated that Lamar was historically one of the two elite public high schools in all of Texas, along with Highland Park High School near Dallas. Laura Nathan-Garner, author of the second edition of the Insiders' Guide to Houston (2012), wrote that Lamar was "considered one of the area's best public high schools."

In January 2015 the school began issuing laptop computers to all students. Several classes now use the "flipped classroom" model where the teacher uploads lectures that may be viewed over the internet at any time, while hands-on work is done in the classroom.

In the pre-desegregation period just about all Lamar students matriculated to colleges and universities. After desegregation in the 1970s and the resulting social class changes, the percentage of students moving on to colleges and universities was down to about 66% by 1975. At that time there were declines in the National Merit Qualifying Exam and SAT test scores.

In 2007, Lamar was ranked as in Jay Mathews Newsweek's lists of the top high schools in the United States. Many students in other parts of Houston ISD transfer to Lamar to escape home schools that do not have a good academic performance, causing the attendance figures of those schools to suffer.

In 2007 Todd Spivak of the Houston Press reported about the magazine's feature "These Kids Go to the Best Public High School in Houston." Spivak said that Lamar High School, which he described as "well-regarded," received a lower rating due to a 66% graduation rate. Dr. Robert Sanborn, president, and CEO of the Children at Risk organization said that there was an achievement gap at Lamar between the top-performing students and the lowest-performing students.

== Transportation ==
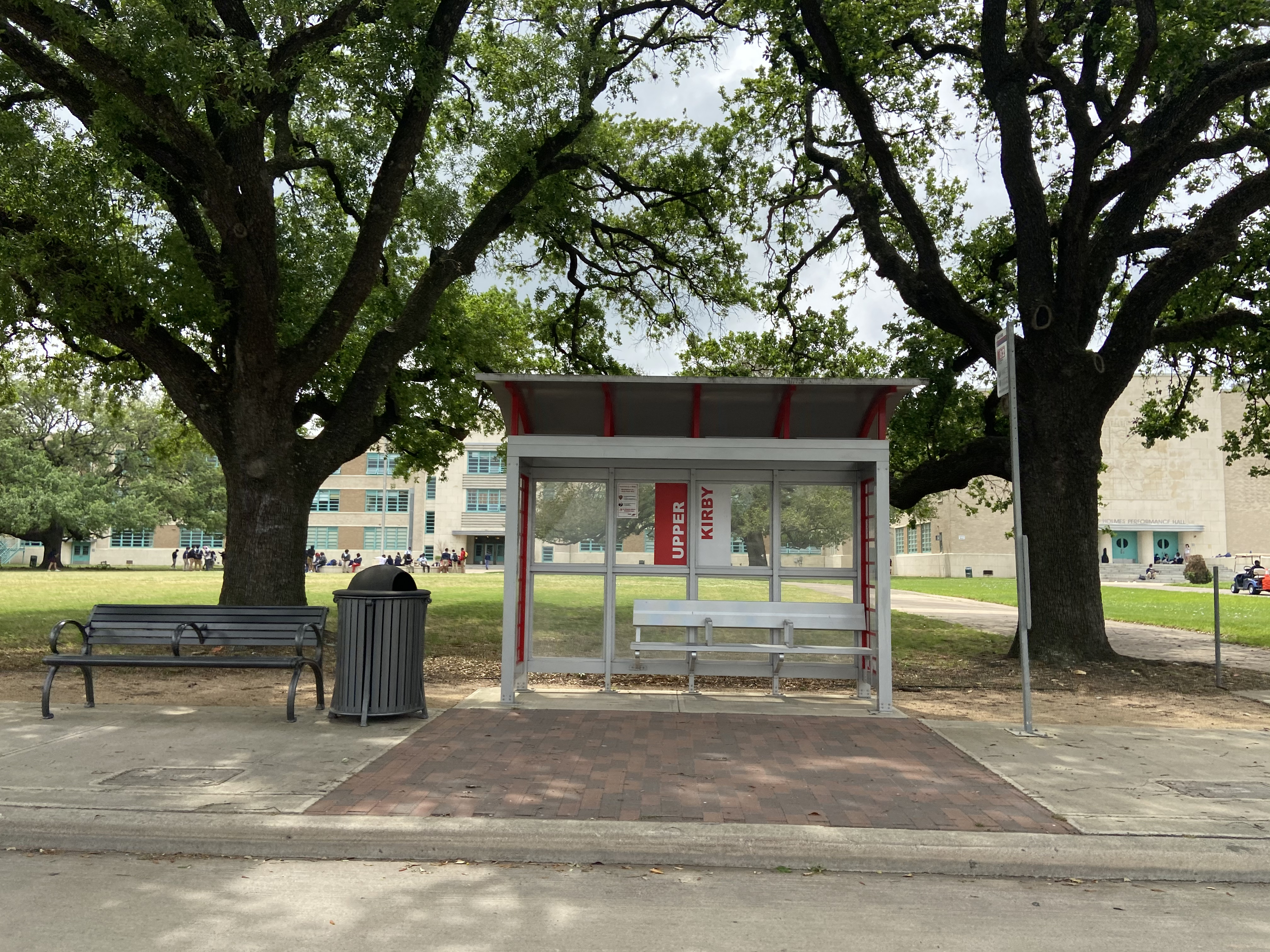
METRO bus stop outside of the school

Houston ISD provides school buses for students who live more than two miles (3 km) from the school or who have major obstacles between their houses and the school. Students are eligible if they are zoned to Lamar or are in the Lamar magnet program.

A METRO bus stop (Westheimer Road @ River Oaks Boulevard) is at the school's entrance. Bus lines 81 & 82 (Westheimer) stop at Westheimer @ River Oaks.

== Seal and motto ==
The school seal includes the coat of arms of the family of Mirabeau B. Lamar. The school motto "Va t'en aux étoiles", featured on the seal, was the Lamar family's motto.

== Uniforms ==
Before fall 2006, Lamar maintained a dress code allowing for students to wear most types of clothing. Starting in the 2006–2007 school year, the school requires school uniforms. Uniforms consist of monogrammed navy or white Lamar polo shirts and khaki bottoms. All shoe types are permitted, including flip-flops; female students are allowed to wear plaid skirts. The Texas Education Agency specifies that the parents and/or guardians of students zoned to a school with uniforms may apply for a waiver to opt out of the uniform policy so their children do not have to wear the uniform; parents must specify "bona fide" reasons, such as religious reasons or philosophical objections. Alice Davidson, a Lamar student who wrote the "Screaming in the Halls" column in the "Yo! Houston" section of the Houston Chronicle, said that the Lamar uniform is similar to that of the St. John's School.

Of the more than twenty HISD high schools that, as of 2007, had a standardized dress code or uniforms, Lamar was the only one that had a White plurality. The principal, James McSwain, cited safety concerns with a world after the Columbine High School massacre and the September 11, 2001 attacks as the reason for the school's adoption of uniforms. The newly created policy received opposition from some students and parents; the policy was criticized in the May 16, 2006 Houston Chronicle by Davidson in her column. The Houston Chronicle printed a feature about the Lamar uniform policy in the August 22, 2006 edition of the Yo! section; the feature was written by Jessica Silverman, a student at Lamar as of 2006.

In summer 2009, summer school students at Lamar were required to buy a uniform that differed from the regular Lamar uniform.

== Neighborhoods served ==
=== Within Lamar attendance boundary ===
Many parts of Houston west of Downtown that are inside the 610 Loop are zoned to Lamar. River Oaks, Afton Oaks, Upper Kirby, Avalon Place, Avondale, Southgate, Morningside Place, Highland Village, Shadyside, West Lane Place, Lynn Park, Oak Estates, Royden Oaks, Old Braeswood, Boulevard Oaks, Southampton Place, most of Cottage Grove, Sunset Terrace, Broadacres, Ranch Estates, Rice Village, Rice Military, Crestwood/Glen Cove, Weslayan Plaza, the portions of Braeswood Place east of Stella Link and north of South Braeswood (including Braes Heights and Braes Oaks), most of Midtown, a small portion of Riverside Terrace, and the Neartown area (including Montrose, Cherryhurst, Westmoreland, Courtlandt Place, Hyde Park, Richwood, Lancaster Place, Castle Court, and North Montrose) are also zoned to Lamar. Laura Nathan-Garner, author of the second edition of the Insiders' Guide to Houston (2012), wrote that "Many children in [River Oaks] attend [Lamar]".

In addition, all pupils in the city of West University Place and the majority of pupils in the city of Southside Place (areas east of Stella Link Road) are zoned to Lamar.

Rice Village Apartments, the Rice University graduate housing complexes that admit families, is zoned to this school; Morningside Square, a Rice University complex which was formerly in operation and also housed families, was also zoned to Lamar. 7900 Cambridge and 1885 El Paseo, the student housing properties of the University of Texas Health Science Center at Houston, are also zoned to Lamar. Other notable apartment and condominium complexes zoned to Lamar include 2727 Kirby, The Driscoll at River Oaks, The Huntingdon, Isabella Court, The Residences at La Colombe d'Or, and Sheridan Apartments. The Texas Medical Center (TMC) employee housing complex, Laurence H. Favrot Tower Apartments, was also zoned to Lamar; On August 31, 2012 the complex closed.

In the 1970s most of the neighborhoods in Lamar's attendance zone were middle and upper middle class, with the exception of the very wealthy River Oaks. As of 1975 the boundaries were roughly Interstate 10 (Katy Freeway) to the North, the Brays Bayou to the South, Montrose Boulevard to the East, and the 610 Loop to the west.

=== with Lamar as an option ===
Students residing in the Margaret Long Wisdom attendance zone, including the Uptown district and the neighborhoods of Briarmeadow, Briargrove, Briarcroft, Gulfton, Larchmont, Tanglewilde, St. George Place (Lamar Terrace), Shenandoah, Tanglewood, West Oaks, Woodlake Forest, Jeanetta, Sharpstown Country Club Estates, and small portions of Westchase east of Gessner, may go to Lamar, Margaret Long Wisdom High, or Westside High. Small portions of the cities of Hunters Creek Village and Piney Point Village are zoned to Margaret Long Wisdom with options for Lamar and Westside.

== Athletics ==
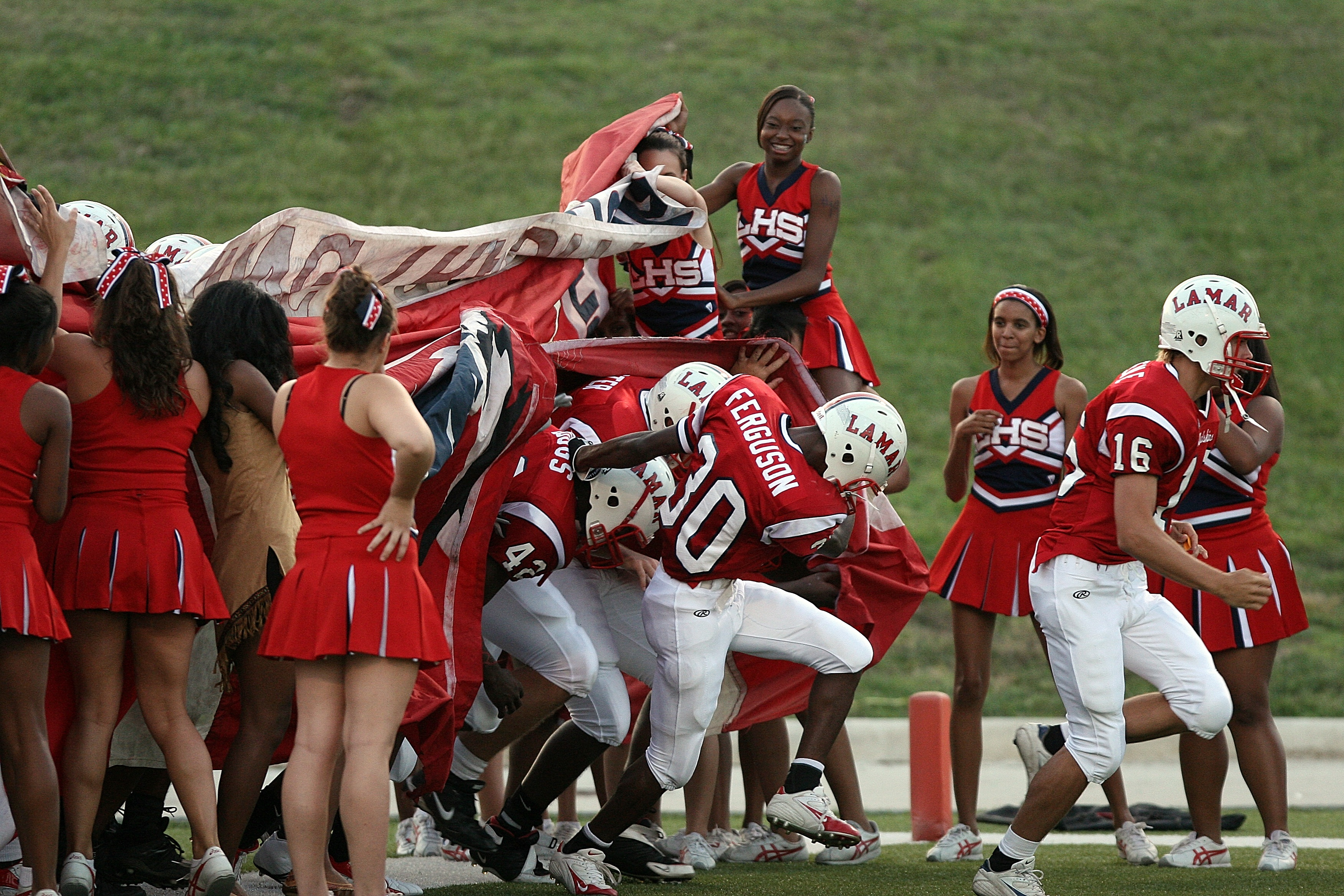
Lamar High School football game in 2006

Lamar High School teams are Lamar Texans. Prior to this, they were Redskins; this nickname was phased out and replaced with the "Texans," as "Redskins" is considered by some to be derogatory to the Native American population.

In 1999 a student proposed to retire the Redskin mascot. The teacher in charge of the student poll included a question on whether the students were willing to pay for the change; the student body voted against it, with every six students voting to retain and every one voting to keep. The student wanted to create his own poll but the Lamar administration did not permit this.

In April 2014 the HISD school board decided to rename remaining sports team names of Confederate and Native American mascots owing to fears of appearing culturally insensitive. Each school submitted its main choices to the HISD administration. The majority of Lamar students voted for Texian, but the school adopted "Texan" because HISD board members believed "Texan" was better than "Texian" since the latter could be culturally insensitive. During the Redskin era, the school had a statue called "Big Red," a depiction of a Native American.

Lamar Texans' archrivals are the Bellaire High Cardinals from Houston suburb Bellaire, Texas. Their main competitions are soccer and baseball. In previous eras the primary athletic rival was Lee High School. American football games were the primary outlet of this rivalry, but it manifested itself in other ways; in 1975 Gregory Curtis of the Texas Monthly wrote that "the respective Key Clubs know year by year which club has sold more grapefruit in the Christmas drive and more tickets to the spring Pancake Breakfast." According to Curtis, the rivalry "is as natural as it is intense" because the schools had students from the same social class and general geographic area.

=== Athletic programs ===
Historically the cheerleading program at Lamar was very prominent. In the 1970s female and male students aspired to become cheerleaders. Curtis stated that being a cheerleader gave students the popularity needed to be elected in student government and club positions, such as the student body president, Key Club president, president of the Ramal club, and the president of the Pow Wow club. A male student interviewed by Curtis stated that cheerleaders had more status than American football players.

Lamar won the 1953 4A State Football Championship beating Odessa 33–7.

Lamar won the 1969 State Baseball championship.

The men's lacrosse team won the state championships in 1989 and 1995 and were state runner-ups in 1999 and 2001. The women's lacrosse team won the state championship in 1999 and 2011. The 2011 Women's Varsity team had five players named to the US Lacrosse Academic American Team.

The Lamar Redskins American football program teams have reached the playoffs 30 times, which ties Baytown Lee for the highest-ranking team in Greater Houston area. In 2012, the Redskins reached the Texas 5A Division 1 Football Championship and lost to the Allen High School (Allen, Texas) Eagles, 35–21. Lamar's football program has regularly advanced to state eliminations rounds, meeting teams from more rural areas of Texas. As of 1979 the team has historically received large booster support and was made up of sons of oil businessmen. Al Reinert of Texas Monthly described the team as one of two "on-and-off football powers".

Other sports at the school include:

- Baseball
- Basketball
- Cross-Country
- Field Hockey
- Golf
- Ice Hockey
- Soccer
- Softball
- Swimming/Diving
- Tennis
- Track & Field
- Volleyball
- Lacrosse
- Water Polo
- Wrestling

== Organizations and clubs ==
Lamar FFA Show & Auction at LHS Front Lawn

Lamar High School has several organizations and clubs.
Special Interest American Field Service, Amnesty International, Animal Welfare Society, Asian Cultural Society, Automotive Innovative Installation Design, Best Buddies, Bike Club, Biology Club, Breakfast Club, Black Student Union, Chess Club, Beyoncé Club, Christian Student Union, Culinary Arts, Computer Service Club, Drama Club, Debate Club, Entrepreneurs of America, Field Hockey, Fellowship of Christian Athletes, Film Club, French Club, Frolf (Frisbee Golf/ Disc Golf) Club, Future Farmers of America (FFA), Gay-Straight Alliance, German Club, Hispanic Club, Golf, Ice hockey, Industrial Technology Club, Italian Club, Japanese Club, La Vida Dulce, Loading Dock Productions, Lacrosse, PACE, Photography Club, Ping Pong Club, Pokémon Club, Russian Club, RAMAL Scrabble Club, Skateboarding Club, Sub Log Indian Club, Technology Student Association, Ultimate, Yu-Gi-Oh! Trading Card Game Club, Young Ladies of Distinction, Young Democrats Young Libertarians, Young Republican Club of America, Wichocolate, Pow-Wowerade, Robotics ( FRC, VEX)

Performing Arts Band – Marching & Concert, Concert Women, Choir, Choraliers, Concert Band, Dance / Dance Theatre, Drama Club/Thespians, Jazz Studio, Madrigals, Orchestra, Poets Alive, Rangerettes Drill Team.

Academics and Honors Academic Decathlon, Arrowhead (4.0 + GPA), Debate, DECA (Marketing Club), French National Honor Society, German National Honor Society, Russian Club, IB Diploma Candidates, Latin Honor Society, Magnet School, Math Club (Mu Alpha Theta), National Honor Society, Odyssey of the Mind, Quill and Scroll, Quiz Bowl, Spanish National Honor Society.

Service and Spirit Cheerleaders, Diamonds, Interact, Junior Reserve Officers' Training Corps, Key Club, Muslim Student Association, Arrowettes Drill Team, Senior Class, Wakonda (Freshmen Club), Warriors.

News Lamar Life (Newspaper), Orenda (Yearbook).

Leadership Lamar Student Council.

Technology Lamar Robotics Club

Lamar Life is a full-color quarterly news magazine. Childers described it as resembling "a strange blending of Newsweek and Teen Vogue." The school newspaper was previously The Lancer. Childers wrote that the Lancer during the mid-1990s "took a decidedly downward turn" and in 2000 was ended. Lamar Life began in its place. Lamar High School has its own news broadcast station called Lamar Cable Television.

=== Historical clubs ===
In the 1970s the school had various social clubs, some intended for boys and some intended for girls. The Lamar administration did not permit the establishment of fraternities and sororities. In 1975 Mirabeau, Niwauna, and Wachaka were the active girls' clubs while two others were inactive. The main boys' clubs were Pow Pow and Ramal.

At the time the clubs had a membership capacity; those with more prospective members than slots held lotteries that randomly determined who is permitted to join. Many clubs at the time had a tradition of hazing new members. Several clubs engaged in charitable events and fundraisers, and they also sponsored parties. Curtis wrote that "But what they do is really secondary, just as what fraternities and sororities do is secondary. It is the belonging that counts."

Curtis added that the clubs "have an aura of exclusivity; kids can tell whether or not they're really wanted there." Due to the demographic changes in the 1970s, according to Curtis, interest in these social clubs decreased, with the two boys' clubs not having full membership rosters and two girls' clubs being inactive in 1975.

== Sister schools ==
Dalian No. 24 High School in Dalian, People's Republic of China has been Lamar's sister school since 2000. Dalian is one of Houston's sister cities as designated by Sister Cities International.

Inage Senior High School in Chiba City, Chiba Prefecture, Japan is also one of Lamar's sister schools. Chiba has been Houston's sister city through Sister Cities International since 1973.

== Feeder patterns ==
=== Schools that feed into Lamar ===
Elementary schools that feed into Lamar include:

- Baker (formerly Woodrow Wilson)
- MacGregor
- Poe
- River Oaks
- West University
- Wharton
- Gregory-Lincoln Education Center (partial)
- Horn (partial)
- Longfellow (partial)
- Memorial (partial)
- Roberts (partial)
- St. George Place (partial) (the rest of the zoning area indirectly feeds into Lamar)
- Thompson (partial)
- Mark Twain (partial)

Middle schools that feed into Lamar include:

- Lanier
- Cullen (partial)
- Gregory-Lincoln Education Center (partial)
- Hogg (partial)
- Pershing (partial)
  - As of 2008 many students matriculate from Pershing to Lamar.

All pupils zoned to Pershing Middle School may apply to Pin Oak Middle School's regular program; therefore Pin Oak also feeds into Lamar High School.

=== Schools that have Lamar as an option ===
More schools feed into Lamar as all students zoned to Margaret Long Wisdom High School may instead choose to go to Lamar High School or Westside High School.

Elementary schools that feed into Margaret Long Wisdom (and therefore feed into Lamar) include:

- Briargrove
- Benavidez
- Piney Point
- Rodriguez
- Braeburn (partial)
- Condit (partial)
- Cunningham (partial)
- Emerson (partial)
- St. George Place (partial) (the rest directly feeds into Lamar)
- Sutton (partial)

Middle schools that feed into Margaret Long Wisdom (and therefore also feed into Lamar) include:

- Grady
- Long (partial)
- Pershing (partial)
- Revere (partial)
- All pupils zoned to Long and Pershing Middle Schools may attend Pin Oak Middle School; therefore Pin Oak also feeds into Wisdom High School and Lamar High School.

K-8 schools that feed into Margaret Long Wisdom (and therefore also feed into Lamar) include:

- Pilgrim
- Residents of the Briargrove, Emerson, Pilgrim, and Piney Point elementary attendance zones may apply for the Briarmeadow Charter School, so the K-8 school feeds into Wisdom.

== Notable alumni ==
- Lauren Anderson – prima ballerina with Houston Ballet from 1990 to 2006
- Rod Babers- Former UT and NFL football player
- Herring B. Bailey – part-time NASCAR racer
- Bill Bentley – music executive and record producer
- Jack S. Blanton – former CEO and chairman of Scurlock Oil
- Larry Blyden – actor, The Twilight Zone, Route 66
- John G. Cramer – nuclear physicist, author of Transactional interpretation of quantum mechanics (graduated in February 1953)
- John Culberson – U.S. Congressman (R-TX 7)
- David Dewhurst – Texas Lieutenant Governor, Class of 1963
- Lars Eighner – author of Travels with Lizbeth, memoir of homelessness in American Southwest during late 1980s
- Linda Ellerbee – television journalist, former NBC News anchor and Nickelodeon personality
- James H. Fields – WW2 Medal of Honor Recipient
- Robert Foxworth – actor, Falcon Crest, Six Feet Under – Class of 1960
- A. J. Foyt, Jr. – auto racing champion (also attended Pershing and Hamilton middle schools and San Jacinto High School)
- Ian Gibaut – MLB pitcher
- Carlin Glynn – actress
- Mike Godwin – Wikimedia Foundation general counsel, founding counsel of Electronic Frontier Foundation, author of Godwin's law
- Josh Gordon – NFL wide receiver
- John Gray – author of Men Are from Mars, Women Are from Venus
- Ben Guez – professional baseball player
- Ty Hardin – actor, Bronco, ABC/Warner Brothers western television series
- Lisa Hartman-Black - actress, Knots Landing (later attended and graduated from HSPVA)
- Ron Henley – International Grandmaster at Chess
- Fred Hofheinz - former Mayor of Houston
- Johnny Holloway – former NFL cornerback
- Randolph W. House – US Army lieutenant general
- Bram Kohlhausen – former college football player
- Liza Koshy – social media star and actress
- Brandon LaFell – Former NFL wide receiver
- James Lee Burke – novelist
- I. D. McMaster – former District Judge
- Harriet Melendy - actress known professionally as Melendy Britt
- Max Neuhaus - sound artist
- Jeff Niemann – Former baseball player, Tampa Bay Rays
- Brian Orakpo – Former defensive lineman for Texas Longhorns and NFL's Washington Redskins and Tennessee Titans
- Marjorie Paxson – Newspaper editor and publisher
- Paula Prentiss – Emmy-nominated actress and film star
- Anthony Rendon – MLB player for the Los Angeles Angels
- Will Rhymes - former MLB player for the Detroit Tigers and Tampa Bay Rays
- Lawrence Roberts – basketball player
- Kelly Rowland – Grammy Award-winning member of Destiny's Child
- Tommy Sands – American pop music singer and actor
- Gerome Sapp – Former NFL safety
- Joe Savery – baseball player NCAA Freshman of the Year, 2005; drafted #19 overall by Philadelphia Phillies in 2007
- Gilbert Shelton – Cartoonist and creator of The Fabulous Furry Freak Brothers
- Bob Smith – Former football player
- Jaclyn Smith – Golden Globe-nominated actress, Charlie's Angels
- James Marcus Smith – actor
- Columba Stewart, OSB — Benedictine Monk, Rescuer of Endangered Manuscripts, 2019 Jefferson Lecturer in the Humanities
- Tommy Tune – dancer, choreographer and actor, 10-time Tony Award winner
- Glenn Vaughan - former MLB player for the Houston Colt .45s
- Mark Wells White – former Governor of Texas
- James E. White – Texas State Representative from Tyler County
- Robert Woodrow Wilson – physicist and winner of the Nobel Prize
- Gene Wolfe – science-fiction writer (class of 1949)
- Jimmy Wooley - two-time Olympian in Judo, Class of 1968.
- Bill Worrell - Sportscaster for the Houston Rockets and formerly the Houston Astros

== See also ==
- Henry Grover, former history teacher at Lamar High School, member of both houses of the Texas State Legislature and Republican gubernatorial nominee in 1972
