= La Colombe d'Or =

Hotel and residential complex

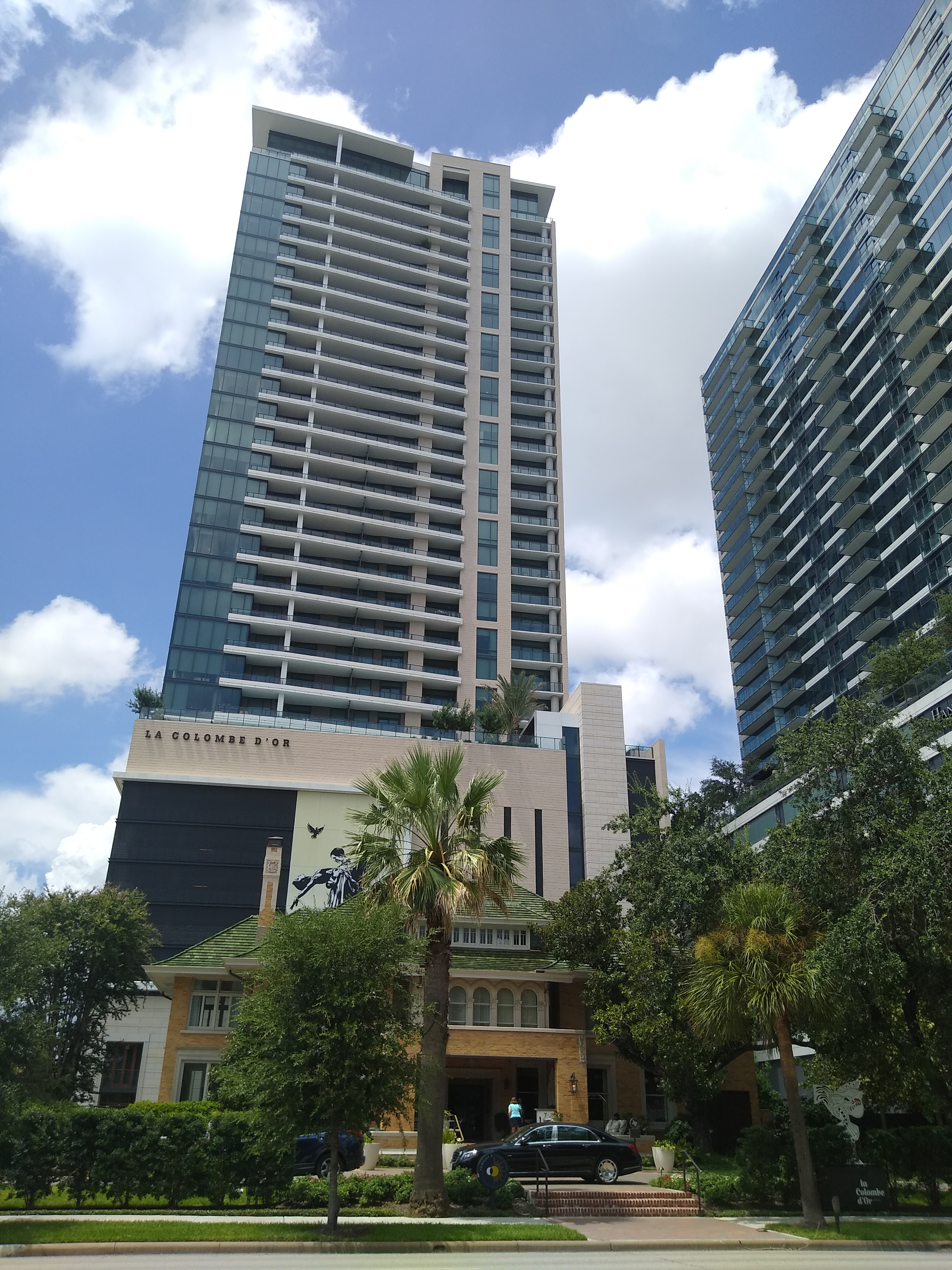
Tower and original building

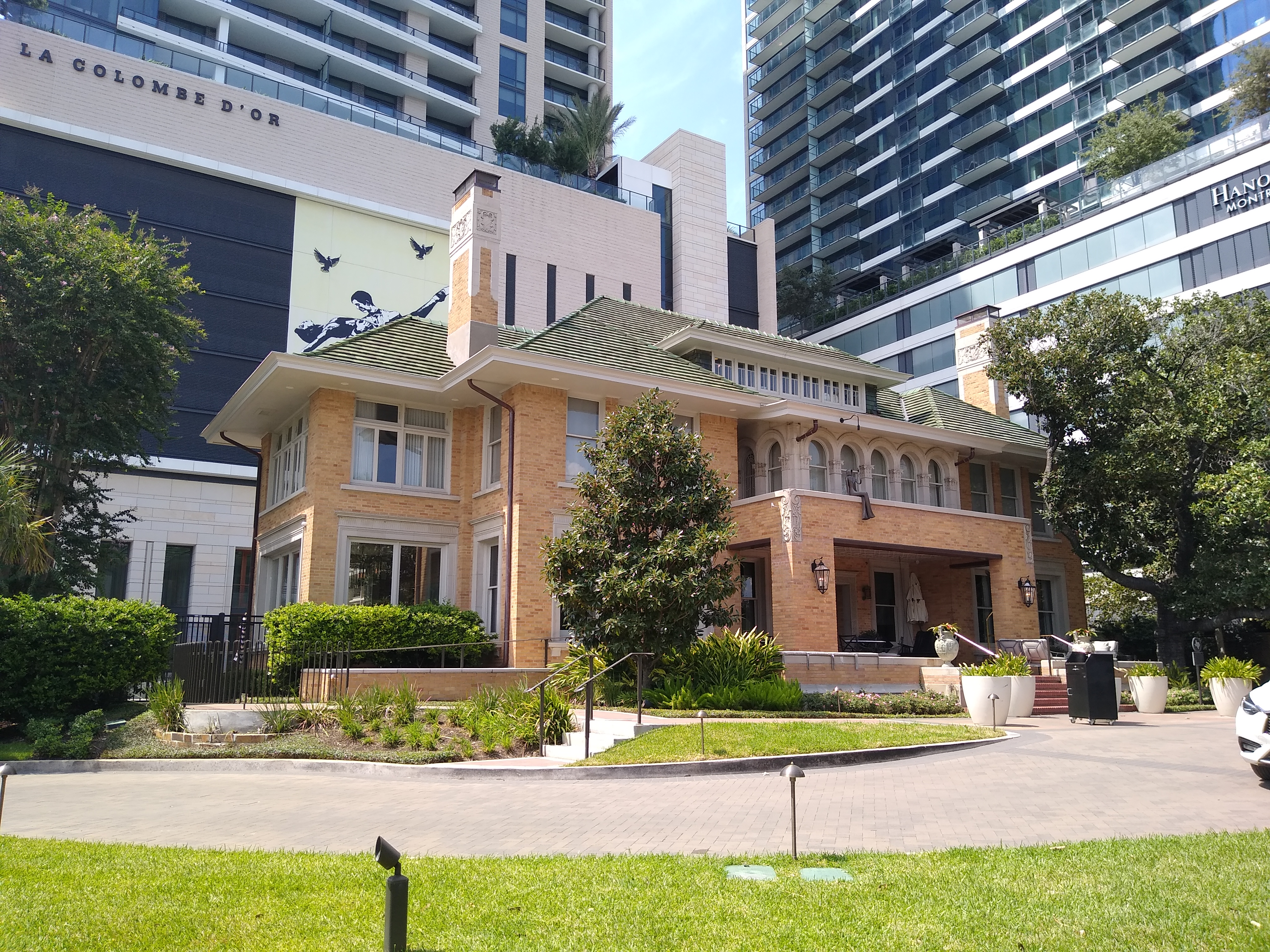
Closeup of the original building, formerly the Fondren Mansion

La Colombe d'Or is a hotel and residential complex in Neartown, Houston. It includes an original building in a Beaux-Arts style, a skyscraper with 34 stories, and a bungalow property.

Its original building is a Texas Historic Landmark as of 1989.

== History ==
Its original building opened in 1923 as the residence of the Fondren family, named Fondren Mansion. Steve Zimmerman purchased the residence and in 1980 he opened the facility as a boutique hotel. Zimmerman wanted a small hotel to match the then down-to-earth character of Montrose, in contrast to larger, more new money designs popular at the time. When the 1980s oil bust happened, Zimmerman ran a discount system called "Oil Barrel Special", getting publicity in the media for that.

Zimmerman also acquired the ballroom of Comtesse Elisabeth Greffulhe, shipped it from France to Texas, and reconstructed it on the property of Colombe d'Or. However, by 2018 he had plans to disassemble it so a skyscraper could be built on the same property.

By March 2021 the original building had been renovated by Rottet Studios. The original building now had a total of 32 hotel rooms available. Zimmerman also added a property so he could have bungalows.

In 2021 Tony Perrottet of Smithsonian Magazine labeled the La Colombe d'Or one of five "invincible hotels" in the United States.

== Composition ==
The tower has mostly apartment buildings, but 18 of the rooms are hotel rooms.

Residents of the apartments are zoned to schools in the Houston Independent School District: Ella J. Baker Montessori School (formerly Woodrow Wilson School) for elementary school, Lanier Middle School, and Lamar High School.
