= St. George Place, Houston =

Neighborhood in Houston, Texas, United States

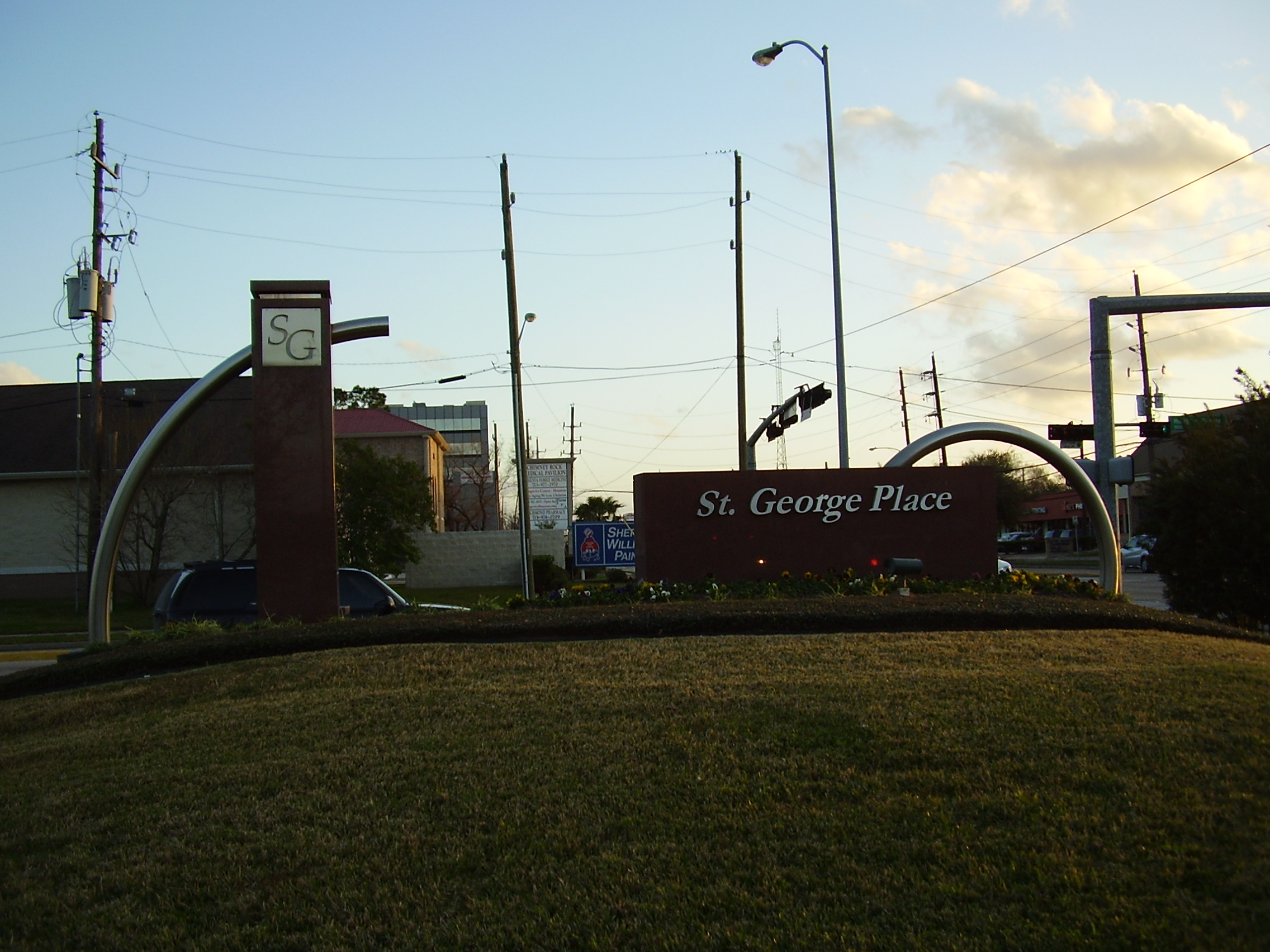
A sign marking St. George Place

St. George Place is a neighborhood in Houston, Texas, United States.

St. George Place is located outside the 610 Loop and inside Beltway 8 in the Uptown Houston area. St. George Place was formed out of portions of an older subdivision, Lamar Terrace, in the early 1990s.

== History ==
Lamar Terrace was established in the post-World War II era. The subdivision opened in 1949.

=== Adnan Khashoggi property deals and foreclosure ===
In 1982 the front companies of the Saudi citizen Adnan Khashoggi began buying houses in Lamar Terrace. From 1982 to 1985 Khashoggi-controlled companies purchased 75 houses. Mainland Savings Association and Summit Savings Association of Dallas had provided the financing. Triad America, a Utah-based company owned by the Khashoggi family, had plans to build a complex including a skyscraper and a 1,000 room hotel on a 21-acre (8.5 ha) strip of land east of Lamar Terrace. Triad had acquired the site in the mid-1970s. In 1983 the company said that it had suspended the project. In 1985 Triad sold the hotel site to Mainland and gained a line of credit. In 1986 Summit, which had loaned $5 million ($14342744.38 in current money) to Triad Properties Corp., a subsidiary of Triad America, filed loan foreclosure proceedings in order to repossess 47 of the houses. In 1986 Summit declined to foreclose on the houses. Later in 1986, the houses were foreclosed upon.

=== Urban blight ===
By the late 1980s urban blight had been affecting Lamar Terrace. In 1989 Ralph Bivins of the Houston Chronicle said that some houses of the Lamar Terrace area "are dilapidated rental properties with trash, tires and old cars littering the lawns." In the early 1990s Lamar Terrace had been named the "Galleria Ghetto". Cindy Gabriel of the Houston Chronicle said that Lamar Terrace "stood in sharp contrast to its Galleria neighbor with dilapidated post World War II-era homes, abandoned cars, stray animals and high crime." In 1987 Robert L. Silvers, an investor, visited the Lamar Terrace area after having been away from Houston for a long period of time; he expressed shock upon seeing the state of Lamar Terrace. Silvers said that the community was a "disaster." In 1989 Silvers said "You're between Tanglewood and the Galleria and you're sitting in a slum." In 1987, Chris Chandler, a political candidate for Houston City Council District G, said, as paraphrased by Kim Cobb of the Houston Chronicle, that Lamar Terrace was the "most troubled sector" of District G "and could stand a thorough cleanup by the Solid Waste Management Department."

=== Redevelopment by Robert Silvers ===
Because residents expected The Galleria to expand westward and create a powerful commercial property market, they had voted out the Lamar Terrace deed restrictions. In 1989 Lamar Terrace had houses that were smaller and older relative to its area. In that period many investors had considered buying properties in the area, because Lamar Terrace was in proximity to Uptown. Silvers began buying property in Lamar Terrace in the late 1980s. He finalized a purchase of 50 Lamar Terrace lots formerly owned by Adnan Khashoggi on Tuesday November 10, 1989. Most of the Khashoggi lots were vacant. He later purchased 47 more lots from the same agency. Silvers eventually had purchased in total 107 lots, all from the Federal Savings & Loan Insurance Corporation. Silvers tore down various rental houses that had been poorly maintained.

Silvers held regular meetings with property owners of Lamar Terrace. Patricia Knudsen, the city's acting planning director at the time, told Silvers to consider establishing a public improvement district. A lawyer told Silvers that he could establish a tax-increment reinvestment zone (TIRZ). When a TIRZ is implemented, tax revenues are immediately frozen. A "base year" assessed values is placed on the properties owned by the taxing entities that participate in the TIRZ. As the development progresses, tax revenues may increase due to an increase in property values. The extra taxes are reinvested into the TIRZ zone. The lawyer also told Silvers that the State of Texas permitted TIRZs to petition to establish zoning ordinances.

On December 12, 1990, Houston's Tax Increment Reinvestment Zone No. 1, serving St. George Place, became the first TIRZ in Houston. Silvers had asked the Houston City Council for twenty years of future property tax revenues so he could rebuild Lamar Terrace. The taxing entities participating in TIRZ #1 included the City of Houston, Harris County, and the Houston Independent School District. The TIRZ had a $12 million tax base in 1992. In 1993 the Houston City Council passed a zoning ordinance for St. George Place. The St. George Place boundaries expanded in 1993 to include their current boundaries.

=== Development of St. George Place ===
New home construction was slow in St. George Place. To promote home building, Silvers founded Ironwood Homes, and that company began building houses. The activity from Ironwood Homes attracted other home builders. Silvers said that he had not planned to or desired to become a developer.

In August 1999 the St. George Place Civic Association incorporated, allowing for residents to more easily interact with the TIRZ board. In 1999 Silver said that while he was glad that St. George Place had improved, he was frustrated by the slow pace of development. He said that he wished he had never established the TIRZ, since in doing so, he was not making as much money as he would if he had immediately sold the properties that he had purchased in the late 1980s.

Around 2000 new infrastructure such as sewer and water facilities was being installed to service the newly built houses, because the infrastructure built to serve Lamar Terrace was not adequate for servicing the new houses. In 2002 Silvers, as paraphrased by Thom Marshall of the Houston Chronicle, said that he had "planned for development of the zone to be finished by now" but that "it's only reached the halfway mark [...] because the city will not file condemnation lawsuits to take properties from investors who are not developing them."

In 2006 the TIRZ had a tax base of over $160 million ($249560911.19 in current money). During that year, Mike Snyder of the Houston Chronicle said that St. George Place residents "enjoy mostly new, upscale homes, well-maintained streets and easy access to shopping, entertainment and major employment centers."

== Government and infrastructure ==
The St. George Redevelopment Authority, with a nine member board appointed by the Houston City Council, administers St. George Place. Most board members are property owners and residents.

The St. George Place TIRZ is the only one in which there is a zoning ordinance and the only zoned area in the City of Houston. Mike Snyder of the Houston Chronicle said "Zoning, however, has not insulated St. George Place from the kind of land-use battles that are common in a city where neighborhood leaders often feel powerless to influence the form of development springing up all around them." Snyder said that the zoning was perhaps the most "cherished asset" in St. George Place.

St. George Place is divided between City Council District G and City Council District J. In the 1990s and 2000s (decade), St. George Place/Lamar Terrace was in Council District C. In the 1980s it was in Council District G.

Houston Fire Department's Fire Station 28 is located at 3100 Chimney Rock @ Dolores.

The neighborhood is served by the Houston Police Department Midwest Patrol Division.

St. George Place is in Texas's 7th congressional district.

== Cityscape ==
The current St. George Place and the former Lamar Terrace area are bounded by West Alabama Street, Chimney Rock Drive, Richmond Avenue, and South Rice Avenue. The community of west of The Galleria.

In 2000 the houses were priced from $350,000 ($639062.8 in current money) to $450,000 ($821652.17 in current money). As of April 18, 2002, 242 new houses had been built in St. George Place, with 50 of them being built from January 1, 2002 to April 18, 2002. During the same period, 150 older houses and 80 vacant lots for development had remained. During that period, Bill Hutz, president of the St. George Civic Association, said that he anticipated for the old houses to be completely replaced with newer houses in a five-year period.

In 1999, when discussing the lack of development with Silvers, Brian Wallstin of the Houston Press said "[f]rom an aesthetic perspective, Silvers has a point. The juxtaposition of low-slung ranch houses interspersed with towering multistory brick manses gives St. George Place the look of a bad haircut." Prior to Silvers's investment and redevelopment, Lamar Terrace had a lot of front-yard mechanics and neglected houses. By 1999 the neglected properties had been demolished and the mechanics were no longer in business.

By 2016, home and land values in St George Place (often listed in Lamar Terrace subdivision in real estate listings) had increased substantially, with moderately-used and brand-new homes priced from $575,000 to $1,500,000. ($753352.05 to $($1965266.22 in current money).

Map of St. George Place Management District with original & revised TIRZ 1 boundaries: St. Geo. Place Mgmt. Dist./TIRZ 1 boundaries

== Demographics ==
In the 1990s, many of the individuals renting houses in Lamar Terrace were low-income Hispanic people.

In 2016, those demographics have evolved to wealthy empty-nester and young professional families of many different nationalities.

== Education ==
=== Public schools ===
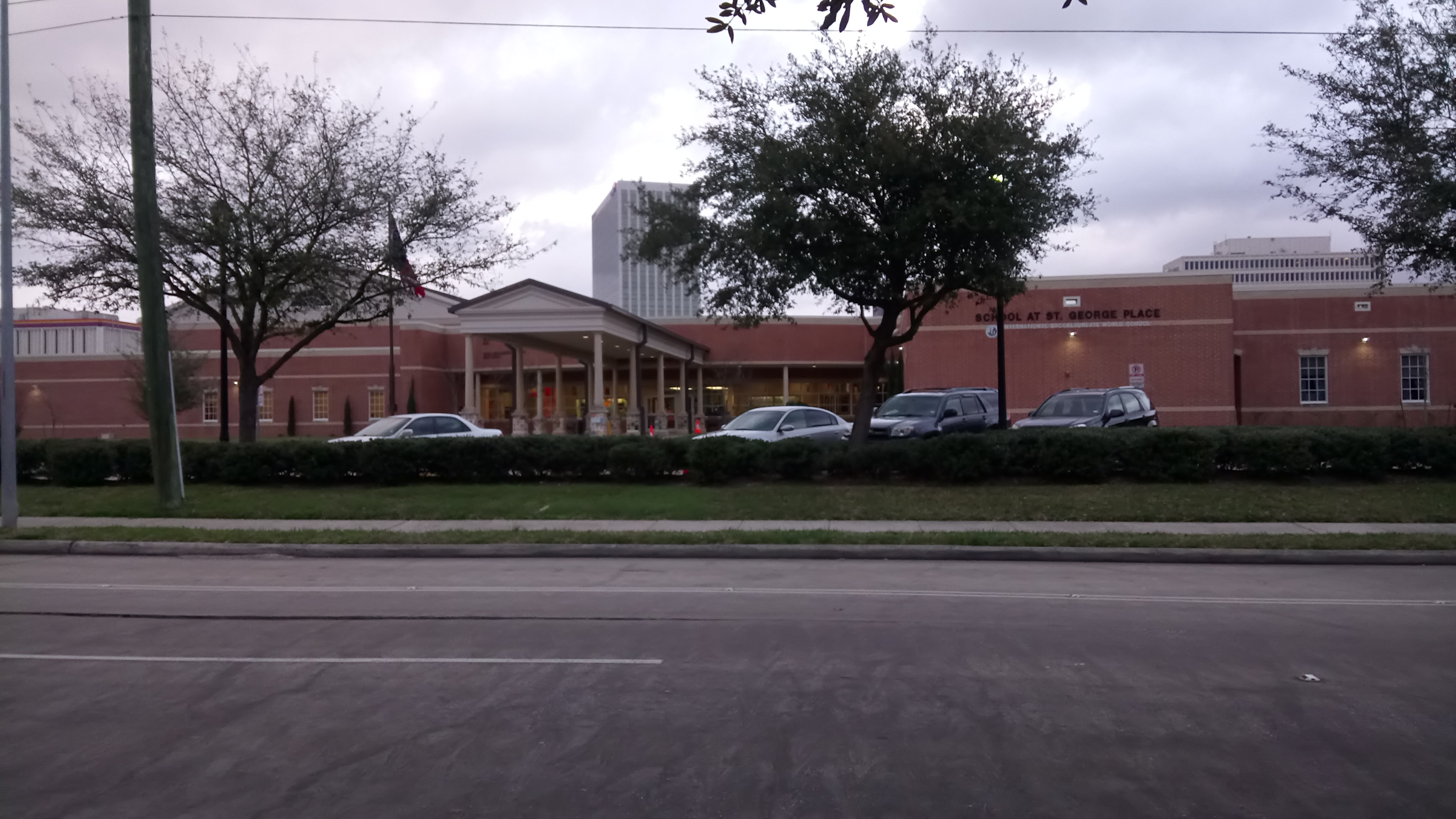
St. George Place Elementary School

St. George Place is served by the Houston Independent School District. St. George Place is zoned to St. George Place Elementary School and Tanglewood Middle School (formerly Grady Middle School). St. George Place students are zoned to Margaret Long Wisdom High School (formerly Lee High School) and may choose to attend Lamar High School or Westside High School.

St. George Place Elementary School, an 86,000-square-foot (8,000 m^{2}) facility, has a capacity of 750 students. It serves areas east and west of the 610 Loop; the bulk of its boundary is south of Westheimer Road, north of Westpark Drive, east of Fountainview, and west of Weslayan; there is also a section bounded by Westheimer, the 610 Loop, the Buffalo Bayou, and a set of railroad tracks. Besides St. George Place itself, the school also serves Afton Oaks, Larchmont, and the Weslayan area. The building has various color-coded "pods" in which classes are concentrated; the color scheme was used to assist young children. It has science rooms, a multi-purpose room with a stage, fine arts rooms, and a combined media center and library. Molina Walker Architects Inc. designed the facility while Heery International Inc. constructed it for a cost of $14 million.

The new campus of the Mandarin Chinese Language Immersion Magnet School (MCLIMS) is located adjacent to St. George Place Elementary School. The 118,000 square feet (11,000 m^{2}) facility, which has a price tag of $32 million, uses a sun and moon theme. The 2012 HISD Bond financed the construction. Groundbreaking occurred in December 2014.

==== History of schools ====
In 1993 HISD was planning to build a middle school on a 20-acre (8.1 ha) site in Lamar Terrace. HISD officials planned to convert Grady Middle School into an elementary school, and have the Lamar Terrace middle school serve students from Grady, Piney Point Elementary, and Pilgrim Elementary. Ron Franklin, a member of the HISD school board, said that the Lamar Terrace area was the only affordable land in the area, and that a new middle school in the area was needed. Several Lamar Terrace area residents opposed a plan to place an HISD middle school in the neighborhood. In 1995 HISD was buying properties to demolish them to make room for the new Lamar Terrace-area school. Ultimately HISD had acquired 94 lots for a site for the new school, using its eminent domain powers, and all of the houses were demolished. HISD had spent $10 million to clear the lots.

As of 2000 no school had yet been built, because no bonds to build new schools had yet been approved. By 2002 HISD had not yet developed the property, and the district stated that it did not know when it would begin developing a school there. A public relations employee of HISD stated that the district acquires parcels of land just in case that a school may be needed there. By 2003 HISD had not yet developed the property.

St. George Place Elementary opened in 2006. Most of the funds used to develop the school came from the HISD bond while some came from the TIRZ. Prior to the school's opening, St. George Place was served by Pilgrim Elementary School. St. George Place was the successor of the charter school School at Post Oak, which was held at a YMCA and formed to relieve overcrowded area schools; about 180 students were to transfer from School at Post Oak to St.George Place.

=== Public libraries ===
The closest library is the Jungman Branch of the Houston Public Library.

== Parks and recreation ==
The city of Houston operates the Grady Park at 1700 Yorktown .

The Gerald D. Hines Waterwall Park is within a 3 block walking distance of St. George Place.
