= Shuang Wen School =

Public school in New York City

Coordinates: 40°42′40.78″N 73°59′7.63″W

- Traditional Chinese: 雙文學校
- Simplified Chinese: 双文学校
Transcriptions
Standard Mandarin
- Hanyu Pinyin: Shuāng Wén Xuéxiào

PS 184
- Traditional Chinese: 一八四中小學
- Simplified Chinese: 一八四中小学
Transcriptions
Standard Mandarin
- Hanyu Pinyin: Yībāsì Zhōngxiǎoxué

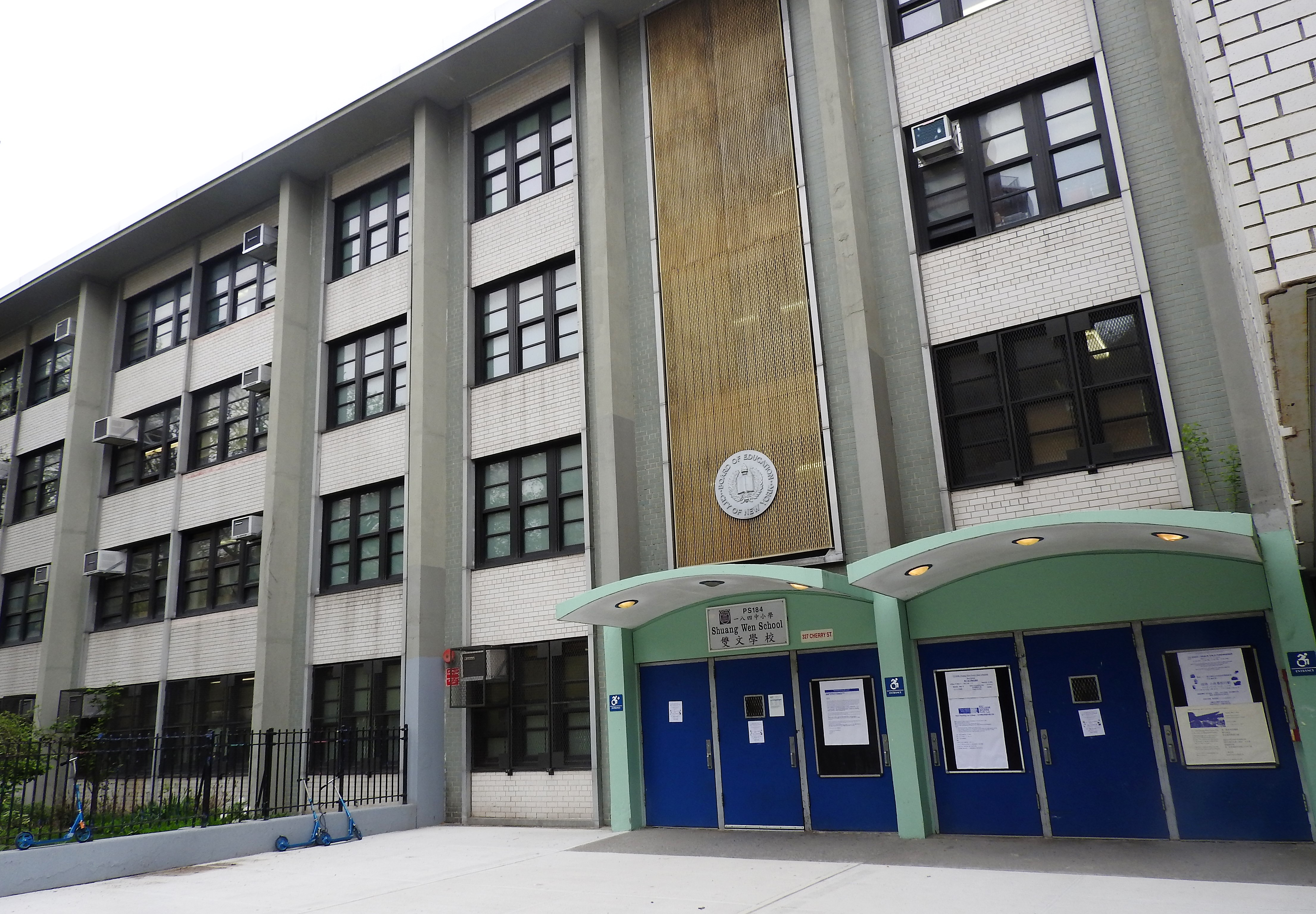
Entrance of school on Cherry Street

PS 184M Shuang Wen School (Chinese: 雙文學校), a public school in New York City also known as PS 184 (Chinese: 一八四中小學), is a Dual Language elementary and middle school located in Lower Manhattan. The school teaches students from Pre-Kindergarten to 8th grade. It is a part of the New York City Department of Education and located in Manhattan District 1 which includes the Lower East Side and East Village. A major $1.7 million renovation of the school playground and soccer field was completed in 2019 by the Trust for Public Land and DEP. In the elementary school, the school teaches in Traditional Chinese and utilizes the zhuyin phonetic system popular in Taiwan. During the typical school day, one day is taught in English and other day is in Mandarin. As a Dual Language school, classes in both languages are a mandatory part of the curriculum.

== History ==
Upon opening in 1998, the school was described as a new type of school, and one of the first English-Mandarin bilingual schools in the country. Because this school defies some stereotypes about race, wealth, and educational achievement, this school has been written about in the newspaper and television media. While up to 70% of students have family incomes low enough to qualify for free lunch, many receive support from parents and school to excel on citywide tests and maintain near-perfect school attendance. While the school has consistently high test scores, until around 2011 the school was embroiled in scandals regarding fees, admissions and the integrity of parent reviews.

The eighth graders of 2007 were the first graduating class of Shuang Wen. The first graduating class consisted of two eighth grade class (about 40-50 students in total). In prior years, the graduating classes took a graduation trip to China, but the last class to go was the graduating class of 2010. The second graduating class trip caused some controversy and was reported on China's television channel, CCTV.

== Afterschool ==
After dismissal from public school, students may choose to enroll in either free or fee-based on-site after-school programs provided by a number of different non-profit organizations, or to participate in programs offered elsewhere. Afterschool programs include debate club, chess club, soccer, volleyball, and community service club. In some after-school programs, students may continue to learn how to speak, write, and read Mandarin Chinese for extra-curricular enrichment.

=== Shuang Wen Academy Network ===
For many years, from 1996 until 2018, the after-school and summer dual language English-Chinese program was run by the Shuang Wen Academy Network (SWAN), a 501(c)(3) nonprofit organization whose mission is the "development of proficiency in Mandarin Chinese, and a greater understanding of Chinese culture, so participants can become better global citizens in an increasingly competitive and demanding international environment." During the period that SWAN provided the after-school program, the program earned a Federal Blue Ribbon Award, demonstrating program excellence and positive impacts as assessed by the No Child Left Behind Act. Over 70% of the students served by SWAN's programming came from economically disadvantaged families. SWAN was founded by Jacob Wong, a retired principal and Chairperson of the New York Chinese Educators Committee, and other members of Chinatown. SWAN began its first after-school Chinese Immersion Program with a class of 40 students in 1998. Initially, the SWAN after-school program was mandatory for all PS184 Shuang Wen students and made free of charge funded by grants. In 2009, as funding started to run out, parents were initially charged $600, but later refunded when funds became available. The program also shifted from a mandatory model to an opt-in model. SWAN sent a letter informing parents to pay the program fees by the deadline or children will be left unsupervised in the cafeteria if parents don't arrive on time for pick-up. In 2010, the program raised the fee to $1,000. Beginning in 2011, SWAN's summer program began to enroll students from a number of different schools. Despite the school's claim that the program was no longer mandatory, parents complained that students couldn't succeed in the regular school hours without the after school program due to the lack of Mandarin education during the regular school day. Parents complained that the school constantly asked for more money. This, among other issues, prompted an investigation by New York City schools as to whether these afterschool tuition fees were legal. In 2018, SWAN's afterschool and summer programs moved out of the PS184m Shuang Wen School building to a number of different locations.

== Admissions ==
In prior years, admission was by lottery to the dual language Chinese program. Admissions priority was given to the school's local area, known as District 1. Despite high numbers of black and Hispanic students in this district, the school consistently had an 80% Asian make-up. In addition, the black portion of the student body dropped from 10% in 2002 to 5% in 2009. Critics claimed the school was admitting Asian students outside the proper process while discouraging black and Hispanic students from attending. In addition, reports stated that blacks and Hispanics left the school due to widespread racism.

Nowadays, as with all NYC public schools, applications are handled by a centralized process at NYC DOE. As part of a school diversity initiative that started in 2018, admissions priority for elementary school students at PS184m goes to "applicants living in temporary housing, who are English Language Learners, and/or eligible for Free and Reduced Lunch (based on family income) for a percentage of seats based on the applicant pool. Students who do not fall into any of these groups will get a priority for the remaining percentage of offers."

Over the last ten years, the PS184 population of Asian students has decreased from around 80% to 67.9%, and the second largest ethnic group among students is Hispanic or Latino (12.2%). There are more than thirty public schools in District 1, where the overall student demographic is: 42% Hispanic or Latino, 22% Asian, 18% white, 15% Black or African-American, 3% Multi-Racial, 1% Native American (2018).

== Statistics ==
In 2008 the US Department of Education awarded Shuang Wen the Blue Ribbon Award of Excellence. The city received straight As on its city report card in 2010. Contributing to the school's reputation for dual language and academic excellence, SWAN provided after-school programming to PS184 Shuang Wen for many years during which time the school was ranked one of the highest performing public schools in New York City, so in 2011:

- Reading scores: 83.5%
- Math scores: 97.7%
- Enrollment: 683
- Attendance: 99%
- Free lunch: 78%
- Overcrowding: 64%
- Admissions: unzoned; priority to District 1
- Ethnicity: 8% White, 5% Black, 5% Hispanic, 80% Asian (2011)

From 2012 through 2019, PS184 Shuang Wen school continued to rank consistently among the top schools in New York State, while continuing to serve a majority low-income population.

In 2019, in the midst of a controversial proposal by Mayor de Blasio to implement a "top 7%" quota system to distribute seats for selective SHSAT highschools more widely across New York city, among those PS184 Shuang Wen students who participated in the competitive NYC SHSAT entrance exam, 40% received an offer to one of the specialized high schools. One of the most popular high school choices for Shuang Wen school graduates is Brooklyn Technical High School.

== See also ==
- Mandarin Immersion Magnet School - English-Chinese K-8 school in Houston, Texas
- Pioneer Valley Chinese Immersion Charter School - K-12 English-Chinese charter school in Hadley, Massachusetts
- Cupertino Language Immersion Program - In Cupertino, California
