= Mandarin Immersion Magnet School =

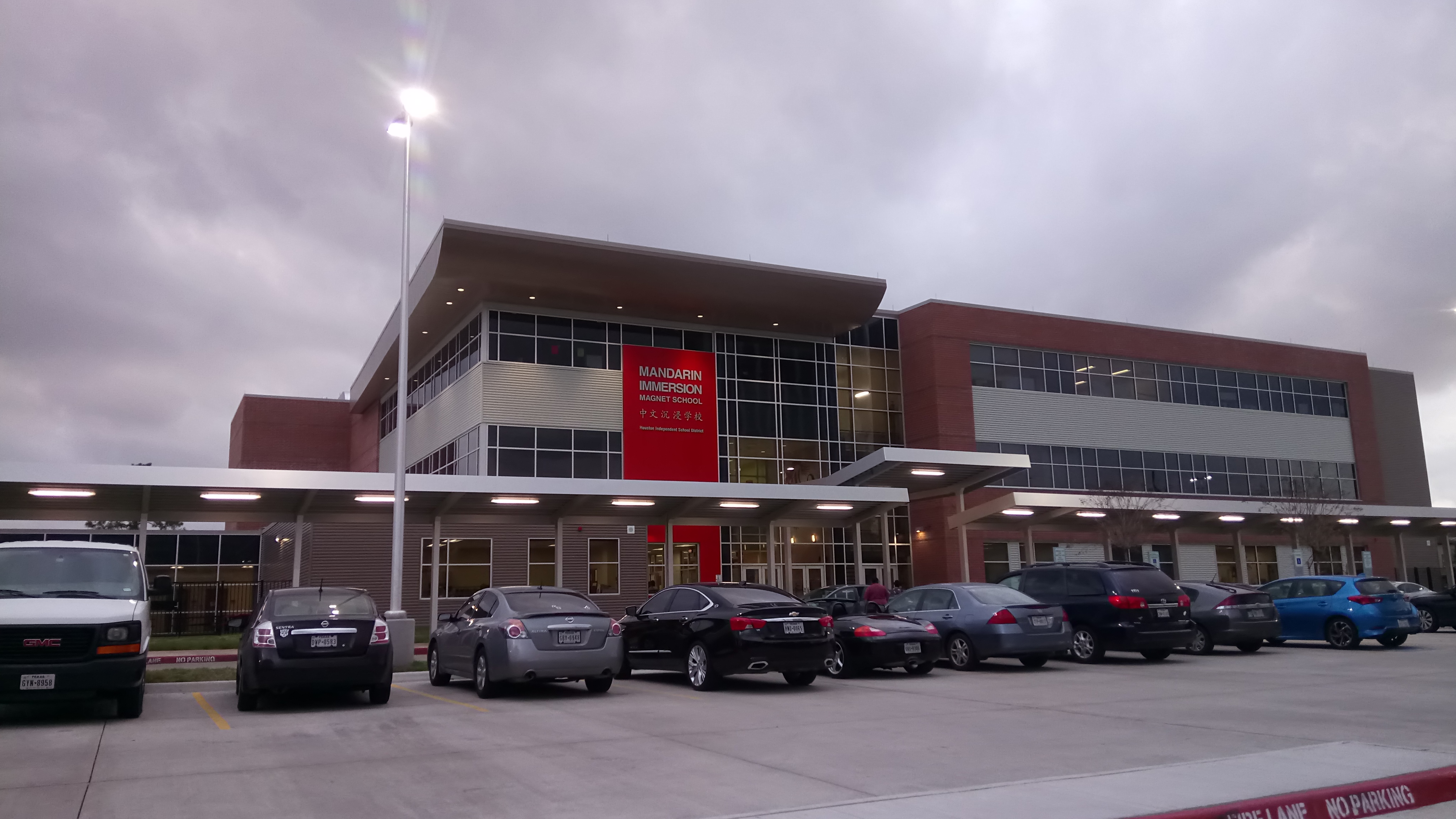
- School campus

Location
- 5445 West Alabama; Houston, Texas 77056; United States
- 29.737377°N 95.472242°W

Information
- Other name: MIMS
- Former name: Mandarin Chinese Language Immersion Magnet School
- Type: Magnet school
- Established: 2012
- School district: Houston Independent School District
- NCES School ID: 482364012659
- Principal: Cindy Tiet
- Teaching staff: 37.10 (on an FTE basis)
- Grades: PK–8
- Enrollment: 638 (2017–2018)
- Student to teacher ratio: 17.20
- Language: English and Mandarin Chinese
- Website: www.houstonisd.org/MIMS

Chinese name
- Simplified Chinese: 中文沉浸学校
- Traditional Chinese: 中文沉浸學校
Transcriptions
Standard Mandarin
- Hanyu Pinyin: Zhōngwén Chénjìn Xuéxiào
- Yale Romanization: JūngWén ChénJìn SywéSyàu

Mandarin Immersion Magnet School (MIMS), formerly Mandarin Chinese Language Immersion Magnet School (MCLIMS), is a magnet school in Houston, Texas, United States. It was established in 2012 and is part of the Houston Independent School District (HISD). The school's current campus in the St. George Place area of Houston opened in August 2016; it was previously located in the former Maud Gordon Elementary School in Bellaire, Texas.

== History ==
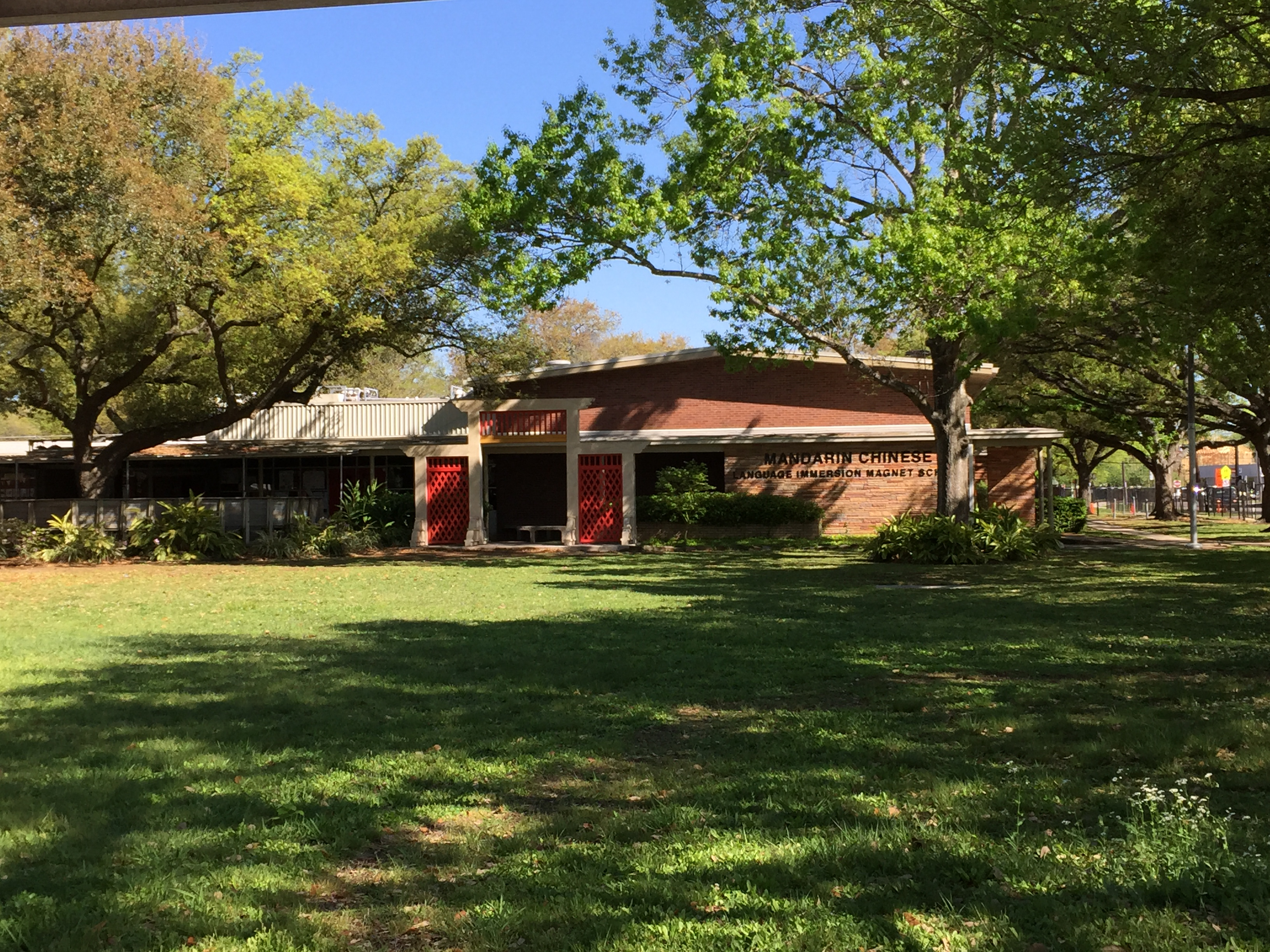
Former campus (vacated before fall 2016).

The school opened in the former Maud W. Gordon Elementary School. Before 2012, Gordon had no zoning boundary of its own and it drew excess students from apartments west of Bellaire, in Houston, to relieve other schools in Houston west of Bellaire such as Benavidez, Cunningham, Elrod, and Milne. From its opening to 1953 to 1983, Gordon served as a neighborhood school. After its closure, Gordon temporarily housed the Post Oak School and later served as administrative offices. It re-opened as a relief school in 1988 for Elrod and Cunningham schools. It was scheduled to re-open in September 1988.

Harvin C. Moore, a HISD board member, took two education-related trips to China and visited a Chinese immersion program in San Diego, California. Since then, he advocated for the creation of a Mandarin speaking magnet program.

In 2011, the HISD board approved the creation of a Mandarin Chinese-language immersion magnet school in the former Holden Elementary in the Houston Heights. As of January 2012, the plans changed, and now the school was to open in Bellaire.

In May 2012, the HISD board voted to spend $440,000 to renovate the Gordon campus. The school was scheduled to open in August 2012 with grades Kindergarten through 2. The first principal was Bryan Bordelon, previously a teacher at Scarborough High School.

The previous Gordon Elementary program was being phased out year by year.

In 2017, HISD announced plans to demolish the former MIMS campus so Bellaire High School's baseball practice field could be relocated there, allowing HISD to easily rebuild the high school main campus. The new campus for the Mandarin School was scheduled to open in August 2016.

In 2019, principal Chaolin Chang resigned; he stated it was for personal reasons. A group of parents believing HISD forced Chang to resign protested, demanding that HISD reveal the reasons why he resigned and to either re-instate Chang or make another speaker of Mandarin Chinese a principal.

== Curriculum ==
For elementary, the school uses a 50–50 immersion model. Half of the instruction is in Mandarin Chinese, provided by teachers who are native Mandarin speakers. The other half are from other teachers who reinforce the concepts that had been taught in Chinese in the English language. The core subjects, mathematics, language arts, science, and social science, are taught mostly in Mandarin. However, the middle school curriculum provides only a Chinese class and math class in Mandarin. The school dedicates some of its instructional time to the development of English language skills. Each class has two teachers, with one speaking English and the other speaking Mandarin.

As of 2012, the school provides Rosetta Stone software for parents who wish to learn Chinese with their children.

=== Academic performance ===
As of 2019, the Texas Education Agency (TEA) issued an accountability rating of 97, among the highest of any HISD school.

== Student body ==
In the 2023–2024 school year, 50.4% of the students were Asian, 12.6% were non-Hispanic white, 17.3% were Hispanic, 9.8% were African-American, 0.1% were American Indian, 0.1% were Pacific Islander, and 1.8% were Multiracial. Margaret Downing of the Houston Press characterizes this as "a diverse student body."

As of 2012, most of the students who were enrolled had no prior experience learning Mandarin. Some students had not yet mastered English, and/or were learning Mandarin as a third language.

== Campus ==
The new campus is located adjacent to St. George Place Elementary School in St. George Place, Houston. The 118,000-square-foot (11,000 m^{2}) facility has a price tag of $32 million. The 2012 HISD Bond financed the construction.

PBK Architects designed the building. Groundbreaking occurred on December 8, 2014.

The campus includes an auditorium with a stage, a gymnasium, a cafeteria, and a technology and design laboratory. The campus uses a sun and moon theme, based on the Chinese character "Míng" (明), which incorporates the sun and the moon. A three-story area known as a "sun wing" houses academic areas while community functions are held in the "moon wing"; the school uses the former to represent energy while the later is meant to represent reflection and subtlety. The school's 3D printing and robotics facilities are located in the laboratory.

In order to facilitate the sounds of Mandarin, including its tones, the school installed a special sound system. The school shares athletic fields and green areas with St. George Place Elementary.

== Sister schools ==
The school has two sister schools:

- Beijing: Elementary School Affiliated to Renmin University of China (Chinese: 中国人民大学附属小学; pinyin: Zhōngguó Rénmín Dàxué Fùshǔ Xiǎoxué or 人大附小; Réndà Fùxiǎo)
- Shanghai: The First Primary School of GaoAn Road (高安路第一小学; Gāo'ān Lù Dìyī Xiǎoxué or 高一小学; Gāoyī Xiǎoxué)

== See also ==
- Shuang Wen School – English–Chinese K–8 school in New York City
- Pioneer Valley Chinese Immersion Charter School – K–12 English–Chinese charter school in Hadley, Massachusetts
- Cupertino Language Immersion Program – In Cupertino, California
