= Pioneer Valley Chinese Immersion Charter School =

Coordinates: 42.3529°N 72.5582°W

- Hadley, Massachusetts

Information
- Type: Public Charter school
- Founded: February 2007
- Head of School: Kathleen Wang
- Website: http://www.pvcics.org/

The Pioneer Valley Chinese Immersion Charter School (simplified Chinese: 先锋中英双语学校; pinyin: Xiānfēng Zhōng-Yīng Shuāngyǔ Xuéxiào), abbreviated to PVCICS, is a public Charter school in Hadley, Massachusetts. Founded in February 2007, PVCICS offers an immersion program that teaches Chinese Language Arts and culture in addition to a regular curriculum. PVCICS' goals are to graduate students with excellent scholarship, high proficiency in Mandarin Chinese and English, plus sensitivity to multiple cultures. PVCICS serves the Pioneer Valley region.

== Academics ==
PVCICS uses an immersion program to promote high fluency in the Chinese language. Different grade levels receive different amounts of Chinese instruction.

Grades	% of daily instruction in Chinese	Subjects taught in Chinese	% of daily instruction in English	Subjects taught in English
K-1st	75%	Math, Science/Technology, History/Social Studies, Chinese Language Arts and Culture	25%	English Language Arts
2nd - 5th	50%	Math, Science/Technology, Chinese Language Arts & Culture,	50%	English Language Arts, History/Social Studies
6th – 12th	25%	Chinese Language Arts & Culture	75%	English Language Arts, Math, Science/Technology, History/Social Science

== IB Curriculum ==
PVCICS is an approved International Baccalaureate school offering the International Baccalaureate Diploma Programme (IBDP) for 11th and 12th graders.

Currently, the IB courses offered include: English (Literature or Language and Literature), Math (Applications and Interpretation or Analysis and Approaches), History, Science (Biology, Chemistry, Physics, or Environmental Systems and Societies), Chinese (one of two levels), Business, Psychology, and Theatre. In addition, the IB Diploma Programme requires a Theory of Knowledge (ToK) class, an Extended Essay, and Creativity, Action and Service (CAS) hours to be completed with a non-failing grade in each for earning the Diploma.

IB courses offered
Group	Classes offered	Standard Level (SL), Higher Level (HL) or both offered
1: Studies in Language and Literature	English Literature, English Language and Literature	Both
2: Language acquisition	Chinese (Mandarin)	Both
3: Individuals and Societies	History (Movement to Global War), Psychology, Business	Both
4: Sciences	Physics, Biology, Chemistry, Environmental Systems and Societies	Both
5: Mathematics	Math Analysis and Approaches, Math Applications and Interpretations	Currently, Math Applications is only offered at SL. Math analysis is offered at both levels
6: The Arts	Theatre. Note: Students may alternatively pick another subject from the following areas instead of an art class: Individuals and Societies, Sciences. Currently in year 2024-2025, some combinations of classes are not feasible due to conflicting schedules, these include History and Business, and Biology and Physics	Both

== See also ==
- Language/culture based charter school
- Shuang Wen School - English-Chinese K-8 school in New York City
- Mandarin Immersion Magnet School - English-Chinese K-8 school in Houston, Texas
- Cupertino Language Immersion Program - In Cupertino, California
