= Liaoning Province Shiyan High School =

School in Shenyang, China

- Chinese: 辽宁省实验中学

Information
- Former name: Northeast Shiyan School (Chinese: 东北实验学校)
- Established: 1949; 77 years ago

Liaoning Province Shiyan High School (Chinese: 辽宁省实验中学; pinyin: Liáoníngshěng Shíyàn Zhōngxué), originally called Northeast Shiyan School (Chinese: 东北实验学校; pinyin: Dōngběi Shíyàn Xuéxiào), is a public high school located in Huanggu District, in the city of Shenyang, Liaoning, China. It is the number one ranked high school in Shenyang, ranking by high school entrance examination grades.

== History ==
Liaoning Province Shiyan High School was founded on May 4, 1949. It is the only Secondary School that is operated under direct supervision of the Department of Education in Liaoning Province. The first appointed headmaster was the Vice-governor and notable educationist Mr. Che Xiangchen.

In July 2007, the School was selected as an Olympic Model Schools in Liaoning Province.
