= Afton Oaks, Houston =

Residential community in Texas, United States

Coordinates: 29.7499943°N 95.4332335°W

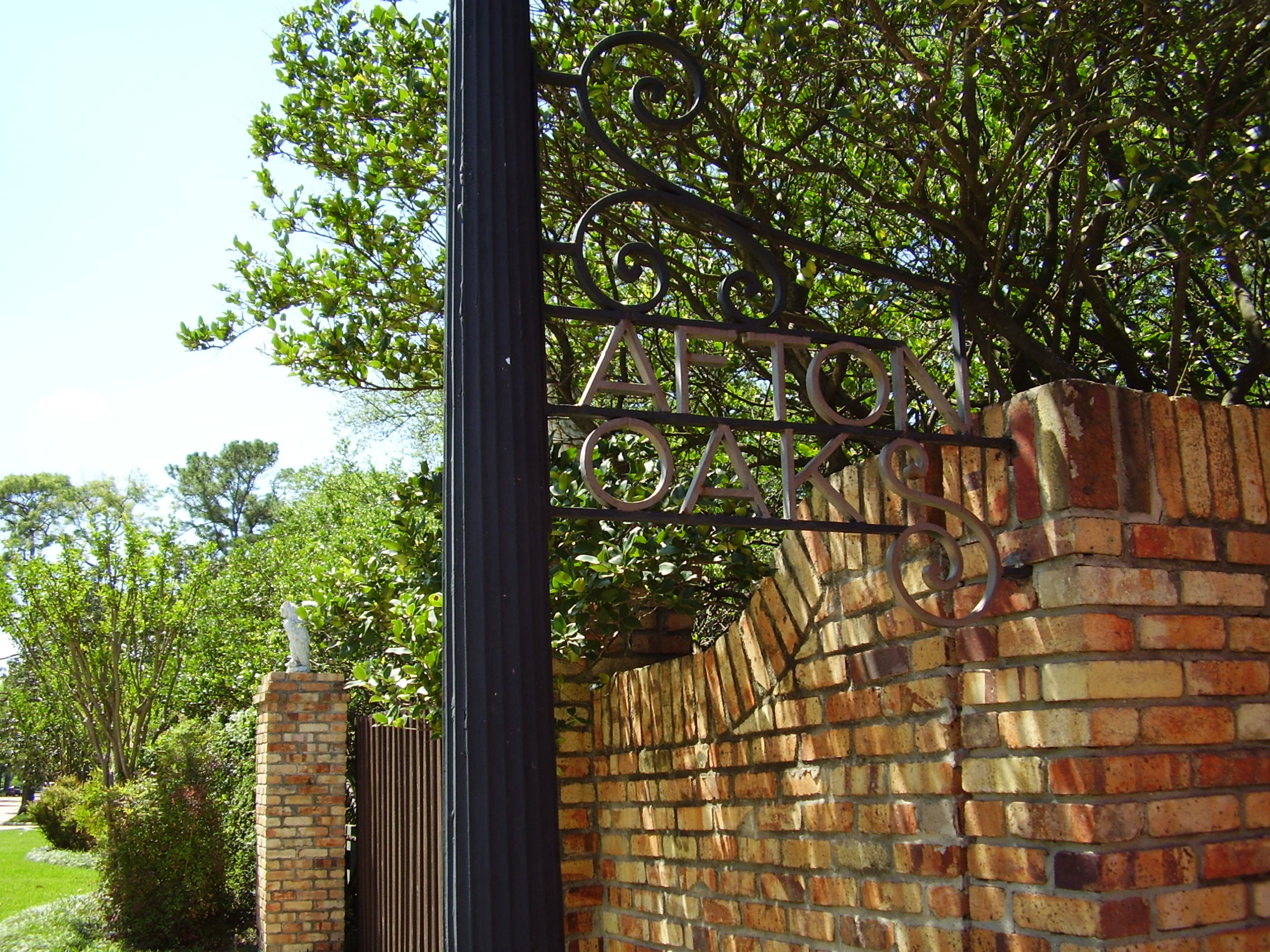
A sign at the entrance to Afton Oaks

Afton Oaks is a deed-restricted "Inner Loop" upscale residential community of approximately 525 homes in Houston, Texas, United States. Afton Oaks is located inside Interstate 610 near the Galleria and Highland Village. The neighborhood is bounded on the north by Westheimer Road, on the east by Union Pacific railroad tracks, on the south by Interstate 69/U.S. Highway 59 (Southwest Freeway), and on the west by Interstate 610.

Due to its central location in Houston, Afton Oaks is in close proximity to several neighborhoods including Oak Estates, River Oaks, and Royden Oaks to the northeast, Lynn Park to the east, West University Place, Texas to the southeast, Bellaire, Texas to the south, and Tanglewood to the northwest. In addition to the Galleria, Highland Village, and River Oaks District shopping areas, Afton Oaks also enjoys adjacency to the Greenway Plaza business district.

The major thoroughfares in Afton Oaks are Kettering Drive, Newcastle Drive, Richmond Avenue, and West Alabama Street. The notable signature elements of Afton Oaks include the esplanade along Newcastle Drive, the canopy of large, older hardwood trees throughout the neighborhood, a collection of rectangular column street markers, and a set of smaller triangular parks. Near Afton Oaks is a throwback to Houston's older days as several long running restaurants such as Bayou City Seafood & Pasta (est. 1990), Luling City Market (est. 1981), Nielsen's Delicatessen (est. 1952), and Ragin' Cajun (est. 1974) still thrive along Richmond Avenue.

Afton Oaks contains many single story ranch homes built in the 1950s. In recent years, like other neighborhoods with a close-in location, significant new home construction has started to replace these original homes. Partly because of rising land values, these new builds are typically in excess of the million dollar price point.

Chartered in 1955, the Afton Oaks Civic Club remains active in preserving the continuity, history, and legacy of the neighborhood by maintaining the upkeep of common areas, arranging services including security and trash pickup, and monitoring deed restrictions.

John Nova Lomax of the Houston Press had this to say about Afton Oaks in a 2008 article:

"This hotbed of anti-rail activity has always seemed to me a place for adults who never quite gave up on college life, specifically, Greek life at state universities. There’s a kind of frat house feel to restaurants like Luling City Market (for UT grads) and the Ragin’ Cajun (for the LSU folks) that permeates the entire area. For a well-heeled residential area, it feels boozy, not just because of the aforementioned restaurants but also the bars and the big liquor store there."

== History ==
In the early 1950s the farming and ranching land owned by the O'Meara and Stahlman families became primed for development. On it Afton Oaks opened in stages mainly between 1951 and 1959. Construction of newer two-story brick and stucco homes began in the 1980s. By 2000 many older homes received renovation or faced demolition.

== Cityscape ==
Afton Oaks is located near the intersection of the 610 Loop West Loop and Richmond Avenue. This gives the neighborhood access to The Galleria, Greenway Plaza, and Downtown Houston. The Kettering Oaks subdivision is adjacent to Afton Oaks. The subdivisions of Oak Estates and Royden Oaks are in proximity.

Lot sizes in Afton Oaks are typically 8,000 square feet (740 m^{2}) to 10,000 square feet (930 m^{2}). Most houses have three bedrooms and two bathrooms, while some houses have two bedrooms each or four bedrooms each. As of 2001 many of the houses in Afton Oaks are ranch-style houses built in the 1950s. Even though around 12 newer houses had been built by that year, homeowners were more likely to remodel their houses than tear them down and build new houses, because the Afton Oaks houses were in good condition and were very large. By 2001 many of the ranch houses had been renovated with new granite counters, Italian tile floors, solid cherry wood cabinets, plantation shutters, master bath suites with walk-in closets, new kitchen appliances, and professional landscaping. Katherine Feser of the Houston Chronicle said that the remodelings "have transformed many of the original 1950s ranch houses into properties that rival recently built homes."

== Demographics ==
River Oaks is within the Houston Super Neighborhood #23 Afton Oaks/River Oaks, a division of the City of Houston that includes Afton Oaks and some surrounding subdivisions, including River Oaks. In 2015 the super neighborhood had 14,518 residents; 77% were non-Hispanic White, 10% were Hispanic, 7% were non-Hispanic Asian, 4% were non-Hispanic black, and 2% were non-Hispanic other.

== Education ==
=== Primary and secondary schools ===
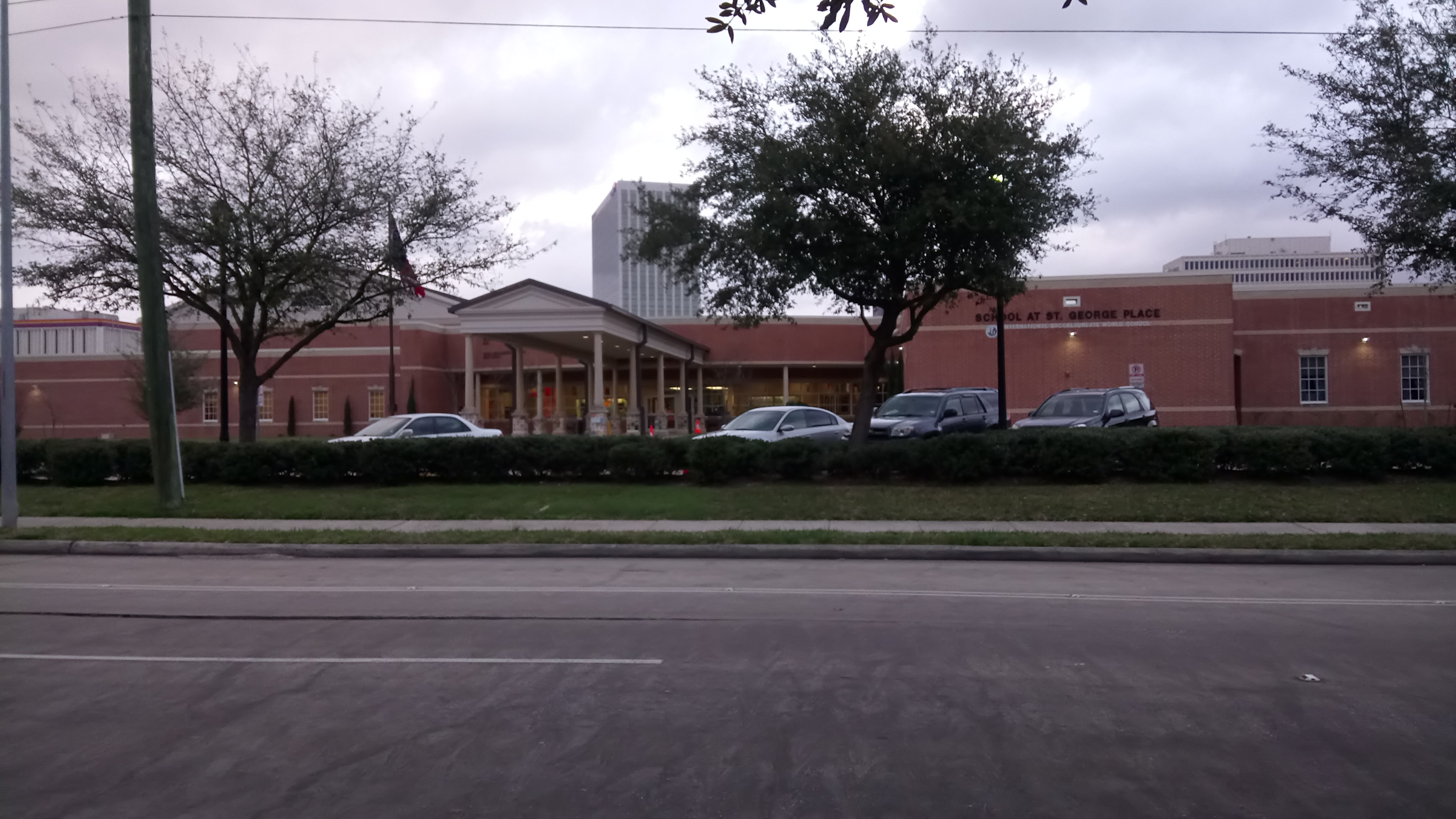
St. George Place Elementary School

Afton Oaks is zoned to Houston Independent School District schools. The community is within Trustee District VII, represented by Harvin C. Moore as of 2008.

Afton Oaks is zoned to: St. George Place Elementary School, Lanier Middle School, and Lamar High School. Before St. George Place opened, Afton Oaks was zoned to Will Rogers Elementary School. Will Rogers closed in May 2006, and in 2006-2007 Afton Oaks was assigned to Briargrove Elementary School. In 2007 Afton Oaks was rezoned to St. George Place.

Additionally, a number of nearby private schools provide educational alternatives. Private schools close to Afton Oaks serving high school students include Episcopal High School, St. John's School, and St. Thomas High School.

=== Public libraries ===
The community is served by the Adele B. Looscan Neighborhood Library of Houston Public Library. The current Looscan Branch building opened in September 2007. The former Americans with Disabilities Act non-compliant library, which was established in 1956, closed on August 27, 2005 and was demolished in February 2006.

The previous Looscan branch had around 61,000 visitors in the fiscal year 2005. The original plans for Looscan called for the library to get a 5.37 million renovation. An Upper Kirby group proposed a new site near the Upper Kirby YMCA. Around that period the group Friends for Neighborhood Libraries began raising funds. The replacement library, with a cost of $6.2 million, had twice the staff and two and one half times the size of the previous facility. Friends of Neighborhood Libraries had raised one million dollars in four months, and around 2.5 million in total to help fund the new library; the group spent about 30,000 dollars for the expenses.

== Government and infrastructure ==
Afton Oaks is in Houston City Council District G.

The neighborhood is within the Houston Police Department's Central Patrol Division, headquartered at 61 Riesner. The Civic Club contracts with an organization of off-duty Houston Police Department officers to patrol the neighborhood.

Afton Oaks is served by the Houston City Council District G and is in Texas's 7th congressional district.

Harris Health System (formerly Harris County Hospital District) designated Valbona Health Center (formerly People's Health Center) in Greater Sharpstown for ZIP code 77027. The nearest public hospital is Ben Taub General Hospital in the Texas Medical Center.

== Transportation ==
Metropolitan Transit Authority of Harris County, Texas (METRO) operates bus services in Afton Oaks.

The neighborhood opposed a proposed expansion of the METRORail University Line through the neighborhood. Gary Baumgartner, the president of the civic association of St. George Place, another neighborhood, argued that the City of Houston should prioritize catering to the needs of larger subdivisions versus smaller ones like Afton Oaks; Baumgartner expressed approval for rail plans on Richmond. Ultimately METRO revised the plans so that the line does not go through the neighborhood.

== Media ==
The Houston Chronicle is the area regional newspaper.

The River Oaks Examiner is a local newspaper distributed in the community.
