= California English Language Development Test =

The California English Language Development Test, or CELDT, was administered from 2001 to 2017 as a formal assessment of a student's proficiency of English standards. The test was administered to any student from grades K-12 who have a home language other than English. The CELDT was developed with three principles in mind: identify students who are English learners, determine their level of English proficiency, and assess their progress toward acquiring English proficiency. The CELDT tested students who are English learners in the following areas: listening, speaking, reading and writing. The test was given within 30 days of new enrollment to students whose Home Language Survey indicated a language other than English was spoken in the home, and for whom there was no prior record of English language testing. Then it was administered annually to track the progress of the student and determine when they had reached proficiency. After the CELDT had been taken, the test score yielded a result which was classified as the student's CELDT or proficiency level. These levels were represented either numerically 1–5, or more commonly, symbolically as in the WestEd ELD standards. The five levels of the CELDT were: Beginning, Early Intermediate, Intermediate, Early Advanced, and Advanced.

The CELDT has been replaced by the English Language Proficiency Assessments for California (ELPAC) beginning in 2018. The Initial ELPAC became operational on July 1, 2018, and the Summative ELPAC became operational on February 1, 2018.
