= Tanglewood, Houston =

Neighborhood in western Houston, Texas

Coordinates: 29.756°N 95.471°W

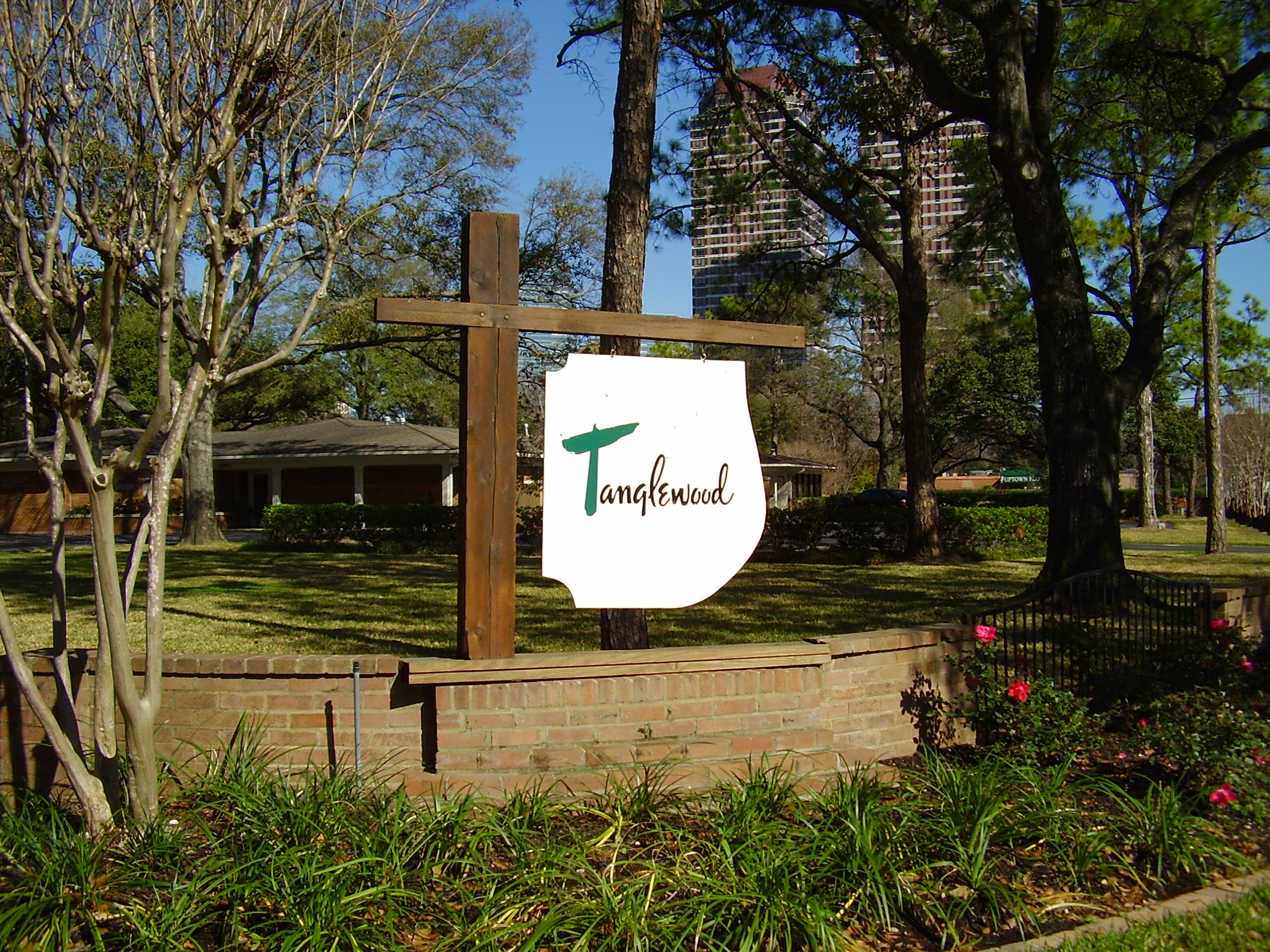
A sign indicating Tanglewood

Tanglewood is an affluent neighborhood in western Houston, Texas, located off San Felipe Road.

Tanglewood is located just outside the 610 Loop and inside Beltway 8 in the Uptown Houston area. Tanglewood was developed by the Tanglewood Corporation. Today the neighborhood is managed by the Tanglewood Homes Association. In 1997 Bob Tutt of the Houston Chronicle said that Tanglewood is "a leafy, upscale subdivision". Barbara and George H. W. Bush were longtime Tanglewood residents.

== History ==
William Giddings Farrington developed Tanglewood beginning in the 1930s. Tanglewood opened in 1949. The Farrington family took the name Tanglewood from "Tanglewood Tales" by Nathaniel Hawthorne. The book was a favorite of Farrington's daughter, Mary Catherine Farrington. For the first six months, no houses were sold in Tanglewood. Mary Catherine, who later took the family name Miller, said that the lack of sales caused stress for the family. After several heavy rainstorms resulted in floods that affected other areas in Harris County, potential buyers began inquiring about buying houses in Tanglewood because they heard that the neighborhood had high water drainage capabilities.

== Geography ==
Tanglewood is within a several minute driving distance of Downtown Houston. The area has around 5,000 trees. Before the subdivision was developed, Tanglewood was a coastal prairie that experienced regular grass fires, preventing the growth of trees. After Tanglewood was built, wildfires were suppressed. As of 1997, developers building area real estate projects negotiated with area tree preservationists to keep as many trees in their developments as possible.

Tanglewood Boulevard is lined with live oak trees that had been planted by the Tanglewood Garden Club. Tanglewood Boulevard had various benches that allow people along the path to relax, and it serves as a gathering point for residents. The boulevard also includes a bike path and walking trails. The Houston Business Journal said that the benches, bike path, and walking trails were "[t]hanks to the Tanglewood Foundation and the generosity of residents".

=== Cityscape ===
In 1992 John Daugherty, a real estate agent, said that Tanglewood is "a very low-key, unassuming neighborhood. A lot of CEOs and top management officials would live there."

Tanglewood lots were large, and had many oak trees. As of 2003, larger Tanglewood lots each were .5 acres (0.20 ha) large, while smaller ones are about 100 feet (30 m) by 150 feet (46 m). As of that year Tanglewood lots had prices of $34 to $35 ($59.51-61.26 in today's money) per square foot. In 2003 River Oaks lots were priced $65–$70 ($113.76-$122.51 in today's money) per square foot and West University Place lots were priced around $50 ($87.51 in today's money) per square foot. Ellis said "The lots in Tanglewood are so much larger than the norm in West University or some of the sections of River Oaks. You can just get so much more for your money."

==== Houses ====
As of 2003 Tanglewood has 1,144 houses. The median house value was $632,750 ($1107426.96 in current money), and the total median price per square foot was $194.15 ($339.8 in current money). The median build year was 1960. On average houses had four bedrooms and 4.2 bathrooms. The median lot size was 16,390 square feet (1,523 m^{2}) and the median house size was 3,882 square feet (360.6 m^{2}). Donna Ellis, an employee of Greenwood King Properties, said in 2003 that the prices of houses in Tanglewood ranged from $300,000 ($525054.27 in current money) to $3 million ($5250542.69 in current money). As of 2003 the majority of houses are newer houses built beginning in the 1980s.

In 1992 the Tanglewood area had around 1,800 houses, including Rambling Ranches and some Tudor houses. In November 1992, 172 properties were for sale, and selling prices ranged from $400,000 ($917714.01 in today's money) to over $1 million ($2294285.04 in today's money). Claudia Feldman of the Houston Chronicle said that by that year, "[p]rices in Tanglewood have zoomed heavenward" and that many people had begun tearing down older houses. She said that of the newer houses, "[s]ome of the multistory structures going up seem to take up every inch of the enormous lots." As of December 1992 a house that was intended to be demolished so a new house could go up in its place, or a "tear-down," was priced at $350,000 ($802999.76 in current money).

As of 1994 most of the Tanglewood houses were still the older "rambling Ranch" houses, though larger numbers of newer houses were built. During that year Tanglewood had 1,157 houses. The median house value was $403,200 ($875832.96 in current money), and the total median price per square foot was $131.31 ($285.23 in current money). The median build year was 1959. On average houses had 3.6 bedrooms and 3.4 bathrooms. The median lot size was 16,500 square feet (1,530 m^{2}) and the median house size was 3,560 square feet (331 m^{2}).

===== Housing styles =====
Its original homes were "rambling Ranch" houses, spread-out one story houses placed on large lots. The houses were outfitted with central air conditioning. Tanglewood's first houses each had a price tag of around $25,000 ($338286.71 in current money); the houses were four times as expensive as the houses in Farrington's Southdale area in Bellaire. In 2003 the remaining original houses had been outfitted with expensive finishes. In 1994 an older house with no improvements was priced at around $350,000 ($760271.67 in current money).

Newer houses began replacing older houses in the 1980s, and as of 2003 newer houses make up a majority of the housing stock. Newer houses included two-story English-style brick and stone houses and Mediterranean stucco-style houses with clay roofs. Many newer houses have 11-foot (340 cm) ceilings, three car garages, and wine cellars. Katherine Feser of the Houston Chronicle said that Tanglewood lots were "well-suited" for the newer types of houses that had been built. In 1994 there was one popular house style influenced by the Italian designer Andrea Palladio, which featured stucco, symmetrical design, tile roofs, and arched windows. During that year most newer houses had prices beginning at $800000 ($1737763.81 in current money). Mary Catherine Miller, the daughter of Farrington, said that Tanglewood "offers all of the amenities of a well-planned community and it has really stood the test of time. This is obvious with the new homes that are being built."

== Government ==
The community used strict deed restrictions to prevent businesses from establishing themselves within the neighborhood; the City of Houston has no zoning.

In 1992 Cynthia Mayer of the Philadelphia Inquirer said that Tanglewood, along with Memorial and River Oaks, was one of three of "Houston's richest, most Republican neighborhoods".

In 1992 The Dallas Morning News said "An upper-class, Houston Country Club-area neighborhood of 1200 homes, Tanglewood is the kind of place that has one to three off-duty Houston police officers[...]"

Tanglewood is in Texas's 7th congressional district.

Houston Fire Department operates Station 2 at 5880 Woodway at Chimney Rock, across from Tanglewood Park.

The neighborhood is served by the Houston Police Department Midwest Patrol Division.

The neighborhood is also served by the Tanglewood Patrol. The patrol hires off-duty Houston Police officers, who drive marked Tanglewood Patrol cars and have full police powers.

The Harris Health System (formerly Harris County Hospital District) designated the Valbona Health Center (formerly the People's Health Center) for the ZIP code 77056. The designated public hospital is Ben Taub General Hospital in the Texas Medical Center.

== Culture ==
Claudia Feldman of the Houston Chronicle said that, in the 1960s, Tanglewood was "a white-bread community, devoid of the color and international cultural mix for which Houston was about to become famous" that had a "clubby atmosphere". Feldman explained that "Tanglewoodies seemed to patronize the same grocery store, pharmacy, hardware store and cleaners. They aspired to the same country club, supported the same conservative politicians, and attended a short list of predominantly white, politically correct churches." Feldman added that "irreverent, have-not types occasionally accused Tanglewoodies of being bland and boring" and characterized the houses as "overgrown tract houses."

== Education ==
=== Public schools ===
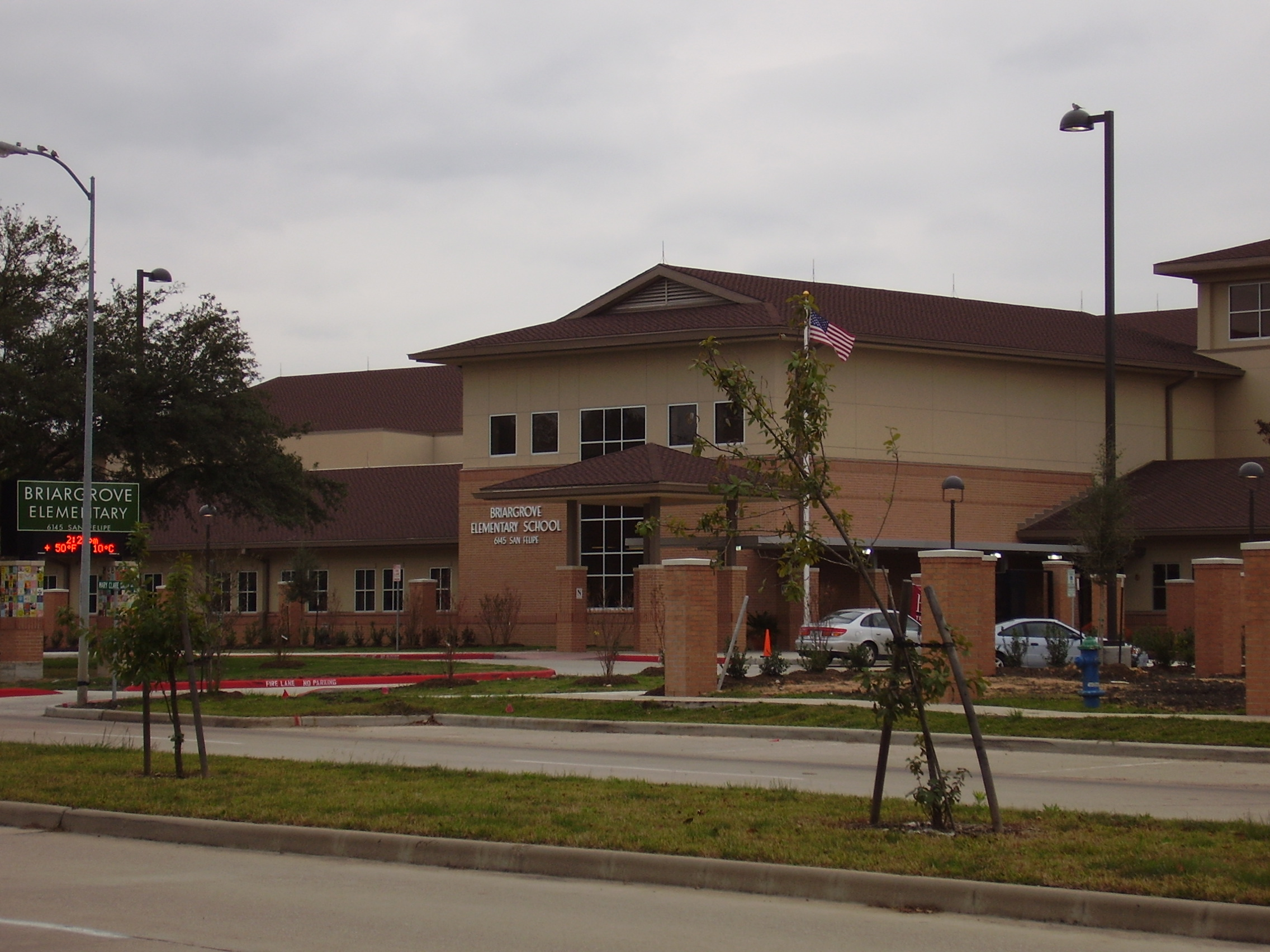
Briargrove Elementary School

Tanglewood's public schools are operated by the Houston Independent School District. The community is within Trustee District VII, represented by Harvin C. Moore as of 2008.

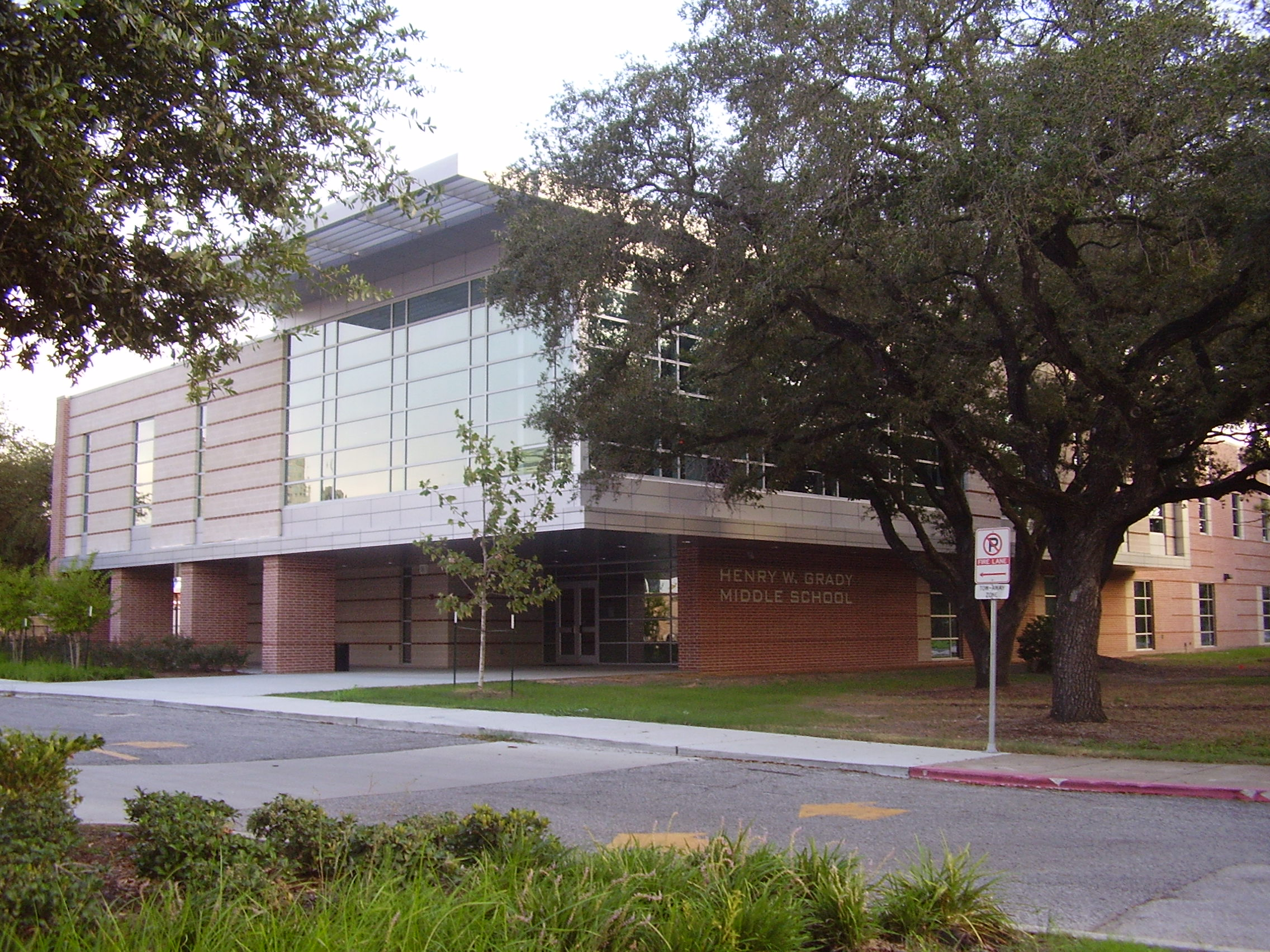
Grady Middle School

Tanglewood is zoned to Briargrove Elementary School (in Briargrove) and Tanglewood Middle School (formerly Grady Middle School. The land that Tanglewood Middle School sits on was donated by a Tanglewood developer. High school students are zoned to Margaret Long Wisdom High School (formerly Robert E. Lee High School) and may choose to attend Lamar High School or Westside High Schools. Even though several wealthier neighborhoods such as Tanglewood and Briargrove are primarily zoned to Wisdom, As of 2010 parents there prefer to send their children to Lamar, Westside, private high schools, or charter high schools.

Residents of the Briargrove Elementary School attendance zone may apply for the Briarmeadow Charter School.

The HISD board voted to rename Grady to Tanglewood in 2016.

Mark White Elementary School is scheduled to open in August 2016. Residents of the Briargrove Elementary zone, along with those of the Pilgrim, Piney Point, and Emerson zones, will be allowed to apply to this school.

The T.H. Rogers School, an alternative K-8 school for gifted and talented students, deaf students, and multiply impaired students, is nearby Tanglewood. In 1982 T. H. Rogers, which previously served as a neighborhood middle school, was converted into a magnet school due to low enrollment. Uptown residents were rezoned to Revere Middle School, but complaints from neighborhood parents that stated that Revere was too far resulted in the re-opening of Grady as a middle school in 1992.

=== Private schools ===
St. Michael School, a Roman Catholic K-8 school that is a part of the Archdiocese of Galveston-Houston, is in the area.

Al-Hadi School of Accelerative Learning, a private K-12 Islamic school, is in the area.

Strake Jesuit College Preparatory and Saint Agnes Academy are in the Sharpstown area, southwest of Tanglewood. Saint Thomas High School is east of Tanglewood, a lot closer than Strake Jesuit.

Other nearby private schools include St. John's School in the Upper Kirby district of Houston, The Kinkaid School in Piney Point Village and Awty International School in Spring Branch.

=== Public libraries ===
The closest library branch is the Jungman Library of the Houston Public Library.

== Media ==
The Houston Chronicle is the area regional newspaper.

The Memorial Examiner is a local newspaper distributed in the community.

The Tanglewood and River Oaks Buzz, one of four magazines produced by The Buzz Magazines, is a monthly publication about people, products and services in the community. It is mailed free of charge to all residents the first week of each month.

== Parks and recreation ==
The city of Houston operates the Tanglewood Park at 5801 Woodway.

Around 2003 several city-financed improvements were being added to Tanglewood Park. During that year, children from Tanglewood had engaged in a coin collecting drive so that a playground could be added.

The closest YMCA is the Post Oak YMCA.

== Notable residents ==
- George H. W. Bush and Barbara Bush
- Billy Gibbons
- Joel Osteen - In 2005 his house was appraised at $2.3 million. A spokesperson for Lakewood Church said that Osteen had purchased the house for $380,000 and that it had later been remodeled.
- Matt Schaub
- James Harden

=== George H. W. Bush in Tanglewood ===
Former U.S. president George H. W. and first Lady Barbara Bush lived in the Tanglewood area for a long period of time. All three of the houses they owned in Houston were in the Tanglewood area, and Bush began his political career there. Susan Warren of the Houston Chronicle said that the Bush family had established "deep roots" in Tanglewood. Bush moved into a house on Indian Trail in the 1960s. As residents of Tanglewood, the Bushes sent their children to The Kinkaid School. The family frequently shopped at the Rice Food Market, now known as the Rice Epicurean Market, and at Patterson Hardware & Garden Supply and Miller's Laundry & Cleaners. At the nearby Houston Country Club, George H. W. Bush played golf and tennis. He represented the community as a U.S. Congressman. As a Tanglewood resident, Bush liked to eat at Molina's, Otto's Barbecue, Hunan, and Ninfa's on Navigation. Bush later moved out of Houston, sold his Indian Trail house, and lived in Washington as he got involved in his political career. Bush continued to own a different house in Tanglewood, which had five bedrooms.

In 1981 Bush became Vice President of the United States and sold his Tanglewood house, making a $596,101 profit. This started a dispute with the Internal Revenue Service. While away from Houston, Bush's legal residence was The Houstonian Hotel, in the Tanglewood area. To resolve the IRS dispute, in April 1985 Bush signed an affidavit that served as an agreement for him to build his retirement home on a lot in West Oaks, outside of the Tanglewood subdivision limits, but within the Tanglewood area.

The Bushes, after leaving Washington, DC, temporarily began leasing a house formerly belonging to a family friend. In December 1992 the Bush family announced that it was building a new house on the lot. The Bushes, as of 1994, lived in the West Oaks house. As of 1992 Bush still attended church at St. Martin's Episcopal Church, in the Tanglewood area.

== See also ==
- Briargrove, Houston
- St. George Place, Houston (Lamar Terrace)
