= List of presidential trips made by George H. W. Bush (1989) =

This is a list of presidential trips made by George H. W. Bush during 1989, the first year of his presidency as the 41st president of the United States. International trips are highlighted in blue.

This list excludes trips made within Washington, D.C., the U.S. federal capital in which the White House, the official residence and principal workplace of the president, is located. It also excludes the capital's immediate surroundings in Maryland and Virginia, such as Andrews Air Force Base in Maryland, where the president typically boards Air Force One for all trips outside the area. Also excluded are trips to Camp David, the country residence of the president, and to the Bush family compound in Kennebunkport, Maine.

== January ==
State or country	Areas visited	Dates	Details
Virginia	Norfolk	January 31	Visited the USS America at Naval Air Station Norfolk, where Bush was re-enlisted into the U.S. Navy.

== February ==
State or country	Areas visited	Dates	Details
Canada	Ottawa	February 10	Met with Prime Minister Brian Mulroney.
New Hampshire	Manchester	February 13	Addressed the Business and Industry Association of New Hampshire at the Center of New Hampshire Holiday Inn.
South Carolina	Columbia	February 15	Addressed a joint session of the South Carolina General Assembly at the State House. Visited the South Carolina Governor's Mansion.
Missouri	St. Louis	February 17	Spoke at Washington University in St. Louis.
Alaska	Anchorage	February 22	Stopover at Elmendorf Air Force Base on the way to Japan.
Japan	Tokyo	February 23–25	Attended the funeral of Emperor Hirohito. Met with Emperor Akihito of Japan, the kings of Belgium, Jordan and Spain, the presidents of Brazil, Egypt, France, the Federal Republic of Germany, Israel, Italy, Nigeria, the Philippines, Portugal and Zaire, and the prime ministers of Japan, Pakistan, Singapore, Thailand and Turkey.
China	Beijing	February 25–27	Met with President Yang Shangkun and Premier Li Peng. Also met with Prince Sihanouk of Cambodia.
South Korea	Seoul	February 27	Official visit. Addressed the National Assembly.

== March ==
State or country	Areas visited	Dates	Details
New York	New York	March 9	Visited the Drug Enforcement Administration regional office. Met with the family of DEA agent Everett E. Hatcher, who had been killed in the line of duty nine days earlier. Attended a United Negro College Fund dinner at the Sheraton Center.
Texas	Houston	March 16	Addressed the Forum Club at the George R. Brown Convention Center.
Colorado	Colorado Springs	March 16	Attended a Junior Achievement National Business Hall of Fame dinner at The Broadmoor International Centre.
Pennsylvania	Lancaster	March 22	Spoke at Conestoga Valley High School and Penn Johns Elementary School.
Delaware	Wilmington	March 22	Took questions from participants in the Wilmington Cluster Against Substance Abuse program at the Walnut Street YMCA. Addressed law enforcement officials at the Radisson Hotel.

== April ==
State or country	Areas visited	Dates	Details
New Jersey	Union	April 13	Addressed the Educational Forum at Union High School.
Michigan	Hamtramck	April 17	Met with Polish Americans at Hamtramck City Hall and the Under the Eagle restaurant.
Virginia	Norfolk	April 24	Attended a memorial service at Naval Air Station Norfolk for sailors killed in the USS Iowa turret explosion five days earlier.
Illinois	Chicago	April 24	Addressed the Associated Press convention at the Hyatt Regency Chicago.
North Dakota	Bismarck	April 24	Dedicated the Centennial Grove, commemorating the 100th anniversary of North Dakota statehood, on the North Dakota State Capitol grounds.
California	San Jose, Palo Alto, Orange County, Los Angeles	April 24–26	Stayed at the Fairmont San Jose. Toured the Ford Aerospace Space Systems Western Development Laboratories in San Jose. Visited Rancho del Rio, a rural property seized by the Orange County Sheriff's Department in 1985 on drug charges. Addressed Hispanic community leaders at the University of California, Los Angeles' James West Alumni Center. Attended a California Angels–Baltimore Orioles game at Anaheim Stadium. Stayed at the Four Seasons Hotel in Los Angeles. Met with former president Ronald Reagan at Fox Plaza.
Texas	Austin	April 26	Addressed a joint session of the Texas Legislature at the State Capitol.
Florida	Miami, Palm Harbor	April 26–27	Stayed at the Doral Hotel. Addressed the International Drug Enforcement Conference at the Miami Marriott Biscayne Bay. Dedicated the Drug Command Coordination Control and Intelligence Center in Miami. Dedicated the Michael Bilirakis Alzheimer's Center at the St. Mark Village senior community in Palm Harbor.
New York	New York	April 30	Attended ceremonies at Federal Hall and St. Paul's Chapel marking the 200th anniversary of the first inauguration of George Washington.

== May ==
State or country	Areas visited	Dates	Details
Texas	College Station, Houston	May 12–13	Gave the commencement address at Texas A&M University's G. Rollie White Coliseum. Stayed at The Houstonian Hotel.
Mississippi	Lorman, Starkville	May 13	Gave the commencement address at Alcorn State University and Mississippi State University.
Kentucky	Versailles	May 13–14	Campaigned for Senator Mitch McConnell at Lane's End Farm. Stayed overnight at the home of William Stamps Farish III. Attended service at St. John's Episcopal Church.
New York	Rochester	May 18	Visited Wilson Magnet High School, where he met with members of the Brainpower Coalition.
Massachusetts	Boston	May 21	Gave the commencement address at Boston University alongside French president François Mitterand.
Connecticut	New London	May 24	Gave the commencement address at the United States Coast Guard Academy.
Italy	Rome, Nettuno	May 26–28	Met with President Francesco Cossiga and Prime Minister Ciriaco De Mita.
Vatican City	Apostolic Palalce	May 27	Audience with Pope John Paul II.
Belgium	Brussels	May 28–30	Attended the NATO Summit Meeting. Present were the heads of state and government of Canada, Denmark, France, Federal Republic of Germany, Greece, Iceland, Italy, Luxembourg, Norway, Portugal, Spain, Turkey, and the United Kingdom.
West Germany	Bonn, Mainz	May 30–31	Met with Chancellor Helmut Kohl.
United Kingdom	London	May 31 – June 2	Met with Queen Elizabeth II and Prime Minister Margaret Thatcher.

== June ==
State or country	Areas visited	Dates	Details
Wyoming	Park County, Teton County	June 12–13	Toured Fountain Flats, an area of Yellowstone National Park devastated by the Yellowstone fires of 1988. Stayed at The Brinkerhoff. Visited the Teton Science Schools at Grand Teton National Park.
Nebraska	Lincoln	June 13	Spoke about alternative fuels at the University of Nebraska.
Georgia	Glynco	June 15	Visited the Federal Law Enforcement Training Center.
Pennsylvania	Wyncote	June 19	Spoke at the graduation ceremony at Cheltenham High School.
Virginia	Richmond	June 21	Addressed the Family Motor Coach Association convention at the Virginia State Fairgrounds. Attended a Virginia Republican Party fundraiser at Richmond Center.
New York	New York	June 22	Visited Covenant House headquarters. Attended a Partnership for New York City and Association for a Better New York luncheon at the New York Hilton Midtown. Attended a dinner commemorating the 100th anniversary of The Wall Street Journal at the World Financial Center.
Maryland	Baltimore	June 28	Attended a Baltimore Orioles–Toronto Blue Jays game at Baltimore Memorial Stadium.

== July ==
State or country	Areas visited	Dates	Details
Poland	Warsaw, Gdańsk	July 9–11	Met with government and Solidarity leaders. Addressed the National Assembly.
Hungary	Budapest	July 11–13	Met with Hungarian officials. Delivered an address at Karl Marx University.
France	Paris	July 13–17	Attended the 15th G7 summit. Also attended ceremonies for the bicentennial of the French Revolution. Met with Ivorian president Félix Houphouët-Boigny.
Netherlands	The Hague; Leiden	July 17–18	Met with Queen Beatrix and Prime Minister Ruud Lubbers. Delivered a public address.
Illinois	Chicago	July 31	Addressed the National Governors Association at the Hyatt Regency Chicago, where he also presented the "E" Award to the Illinois Export Council.

== August ==
State or country	Areas visited	Dates	Details
Virginia	Bowling Green	August 7	Addressed the National Scout Jamboree at Fort A.P. Hill.
Florida	Miami	August 16	Campaigned for Ileana Ros-Lehtinen in a special election to Congress at the Omni International Hotel.

== September ==
State or country	Areas visited	Dates	Details
Maryland	Baltimore	September 7	Addressed the American Legion convention at the Baltimore Convention Center. Attended a ceremony at Fort McHenry commemorating the 175th anniversary of the Battle of Baltimore, the event described in "The Star-Spangled Banner".
Louisiana	New Orleans	September 8	Addressed the United States Hispanic Chamber of Commerce at the Fairmont New Orleans. Addressed the National Baptist Convention at the New Orleans Convention Center.
South Dakota	Sioux Falls	September 18	Attended a celebration of the 100th anniversary of South Dakota statehood at the Sioux Falls Arena. Planted a Centennial tree at Terrace Park.
Montana	Helena	September 18	Attended a celebration of the 100th anniversary of Montana statehood at the Montana State Capitol. Addressed the Five-State Legislators Conference, a gathering of state legislators from Kansas, Montana, North Dakota, South Dakota, and Wyoming, at the State Capitol.
Washington	Spokane	September 18–19	Stayed at the Sheraton hotel. Attended a celebration of the 100th anniversary of Washington statehood at Riverfront Park, where he planted a tree along the Centennial Trail.
New Jersey	East Brunswick	September 22	Attended a New Jersey Republican Party fundraiser at the Ramada Renaissance Hotel.
Massachusetts	Boston	September 23	Addressed the Catholic Lawyers Guild at the Boston Park Plaza.
New York	New York	September 25	Addressed the opening session of the 44th United Nations General Assembly. Attended a dinner for diplomats at the Metropolitan Museum of Art.
Virginia	Charlottesville	September 27–28	Hosted the National Education Summit of 1989 at the University of Virginia, where he also delivered a convocation speech.
South Carolina	Charleston, Summerville	September 29	Toured damage caused by Hurricane Hugo one week earlier. Signed a continuing resolution providing federal funding for disaster relief at Charleston Air Force Base.
Maryland	Annapolis	September 29	Attended a retirement ceremony for Admiral William J. Crowe, Chairman of the Joint Chiefs of Staff, at the United States Naval Academy.

== October ==
State or country	Areas visited	Dates	Details
Mississippi	Gulfport	October 12	Campaigned for Tom Anderson in a special election for Congress at Jones Park.
New York	New York	October 12	Campaigned for Rudy Giuliani for mayor of New York City at the New York Hilton Midtown.
California	Oakland, San Francisco, Santa Cruz	October 20	Toured damage from the Loma Prieta earthquake three days earlier, including the collapsed Cypress Street Viaduct, the Presidio, and the Pacific Garden Mall.
Costa Rica	San José	October 27–28	Attended the Hemispheric Summit Meeting.

== November ==
State or country	Areas visited	Dates	Details
Virginia	Richmond, Norfolk	November 3	Campaigned for J. Marshall Coleman for governor at the JW Marriott hotel in Richmond, Festival Park, and Old Dominion University.
New Jersey	Bloomfield	November 3	Campaigned for Jim Courter for governor at Bloomfield Town Hall.
Massachusetts	Andover	November 5	Spoke at Phillips Academy, the boarding school Bush had attended, on the 200th anniversary of George Washington's visit to the school.
Connecticut	Greenwich	November 5	Visited the home of his mother, Dorothy Wear Walker Bush.
Texas	Dallas	November 10–11	Addressed the National Association of Realtors at the Loews Anatole Hotel. Attended a dinner honoring Governor Bill Clements at the Grand Kempinski Hotel. Visited the home of his son George W. Bush. Dedicated the Vietnam Veterans Memorial at Fair Park.
Illinois	Chicago	November 20	Spoke about anti-drug policy at Pickard Elementary School. Attended a fundraiser for Representative Lynn Martin for Senate at the Hyatt Regency Chicago.
Rhode Island	Cranston, Warwick	November 20	Campaigned for Governor Edward D. DiPrete at DiPrete's home in Cranston, where the two executives played Pac-Man on an arcade cabinet DiPrete owned. Campaigned for Claudine Schneider for Senate at the Rocky Point Amusement Park Palladium Ballroom.
Tennessee	Memphis	November 22	Visited Chucky Mullins, an Ole Miss Rebels football player who had been paralyzed from the neck down, at Baptist Memorial Hospital. Toured St. Jude Children's Research Hospital. Visited the offices of The Commercial Appeal, which he presented with the first Daily Point of Light Award.

== December ==
State or country	Areas visited	Dates	Details
Malta	Valletta, Marsaxlokk	December 1–3	Attended the Malta Summit with Soviet general secretary Mikhail Gorbachev. Also met with Maltese Prime Minister Eddie Fenech Adami.
Belgium	Brussels	December 3–4	Attended the NATO Summit Meeting, and briefed leaders on the Malta U.S.-Soviet Summit Meeting.
Texas	Houston	December 7–8	Spoke to the Acres Homes War on Drugs Committee at Andrew Winzer Park. Attended a dinner for Senator Phil Gramm at the Astrohall. Stayed at The Houstonian Hotel.
Colorado	Denver	December 8	Campaigned for Representative Hank Brown for Senate at Currigan Hall. Visited John F. Kennedy High School.
Iowa	Des Moines	December 8	Campaigned for Representative Tom Tauke for Senate at the Des Moines Convention Center.
France	Marigot, Saint Martin	December 16	Informal meeting with President François Mitterrand.
Texas	Corpus Christi, Beeville, Houston, San Antonio	December 27–31	Went quail hunting on William Stamps Farish III's Lazy 'F' Ranch, along with Secretary of State James Baker. The two also went fishing off the coast of San José Island. Attended a barbecue at the Bee County Coliseum. Stayed at The Houstonian Hotel. Golfed at the Houston Country Club. Visited the home of Jack and Barbara Fitch, friends who around this time sold the Bushes a vacant lot in West Oaks that would become their post-presidency home. Visited wounded soldiers at Brooke Army Medical Center.
