= West Oaks, Houston =

Neighborhood in Houston, Texas, U.S.

- Country: USA

West Oaks is a small subdivision in Houston, Texas. It is east of, and in close proximity to, Tanglewood proper. Mimi Swartz of National Geographic wrote that compared to River Oaks, West Oaks is "more nondescript". Beginning in the 1990s, George H. W. Bush became a resident of the neighborhood.

== Cityscape ==
As of 1992 West Oaks had 30 houses on fairly large lots. Claudia Feldman of the Houston Chronicle said in 1992 that West Oaks and West Oaks Drive South "are nifty, like pages out of a New England tour guide." Herbert Wells, an interior designer from Connecticut who lived in West Oaks and was quoted in Feldman's article, said that the area was "charming" and reminded him of his home state. As of 1992, in West Oaks, mansions and regular houses that had decaying paint were next door to one another. Many "for sale" signs are visible throughout the neighborhood, while Tanglewood does not allow "for sale" signs. Feldman said "If Tanglewood is homogenous, West Oaks is not."

As of 1992, many older houses were being torn down so newer houses could be built. Feldman added that "Most of those down-at-the-heels homes will be snatched up, then bulldozed to make room for town homes." In 1992 Tony Freemantle and William E. Clayton, Jr. of the Houston Chronicle said that "the trend recently is toward smaller lots and self-standing townhouses" such as the lot that the house of George H. W. Bush was built on.

=== Residence of George H. W. Bush ===
In 1981 George H. W. Bush became Vice President of the United States and sold his Tanglewood house, making a $596,101 ($2,111,009.21 in today's money) profit. This started a dispute with the Internal Revenue Service. To resolve the IRS dispute, in April 1985 Bush signed an affidavit that served as an agreement for him to build his retirement home on the lot at 9 West Oak Lane South, a house along West Oak Lane South, a horseshoe-shaped street that leads to South Post Oak Boulevard. The lot is within the West Oaks Addition subdivision, outside of the Tanglewood subdivision limits, but within the Tanglewood area. The lot had 5,280 square feet (491 m^{2}) of space and was 33 feet (10 m) wide, making it the size of two tennis courts. In 1992 the Harris County Appraisal District valued the lot at $79,200 ($181707.37 in today's money). Elisabeth Hickey of The Washington Times said that the lot appeared like "a small backyard". In 1992 Michael Wines of The New York Times said that it was "a postage stamp of a vacant lot, and most associates doubt that Mr. Bush intends to build a home there." Hickey reported that "[t]he idea that the president would build a retirement home on this tiny patch of land, with no room for a horseshoe pit and no lawn for the grandchildren," caused some people to criticize Bush. Jack Steel, a friend of the Bush family, said that the location would be too accessible for a residence of a former U.S. president.

John "Jack" Fitch, a longtime personal friend and former neighbor of George H. W. Bush, sold Bush the 9 West Oak Lane South lot around 1989. As part of the sale, the Bushes had an option to buy an extra 4,320 square feet (401 m^{2}) of land. In 1992 Fitch said that the Bush family was "in the process of exercising that option right now." Because the Bushes, after leaving Washington, DC, had been unable to find a suitable alternative, they temporarily began leasing Fitch's former house, a two bedroom house appraised for $367,200 in 1992. In 1992 City of Houston employees repaved West Oaks Drive with a cost of $12,000 ($27531.42 in today's money), to anticipate Bush's arrival.

In December 1992 the Bush family announced that it was building a new house on the lot. Edwin A. Eubanks was selected as the architect. Renaissance Builders was selected as the general contractor. Construction was scheduled to begin in early 1993 and end towards the fall of that year. The Bush house was to include several outbuildings for a guard post/security office and a U.S. Secret Service detail.

By 1993 tourists began to visit the Bushes' house. The neighbors felt upset due to the increased traffic and security issues. The subdivision received approval from the Houston City Council to erect gates to block the portion of West Oaks that houses the Bush residence from the general public. When Houstonians heard that the city may pay for the gate, Houston City Council member Christin Hartung, whose district covered West Oaks, received mostly negative telephone calls.

The Bushes, as of 1994, live in the West Oaks house. Swartz wrote that the Bushes prefer West Oaks because they "are too studiously sedate to live in River Oaks".

== Education ==
The subdivision is within the Houston Independent School District. West Oaks is zoned to Briargrove Elementary School (in Briargrove) and Tanglewood Middle School (formerly Grady Middle School). High school students are zoned to Margaret Long Wisdom High School (formerly Lee High School) and may choose to attend Lamar High School or Westside High School.

Residents of the Briargrove Elementary School attendance zone may apply for the Briarmeadow Charter School.

Mark White Elementary School is scheduled to open in August 2016. Residents of the Briargrove Elementary zone, along with those of the Pilgrim, Piney Point, and Emerson zones, will be allowed to apply to this school.
