= T. H. Rogers School =

T.H. Rogers School
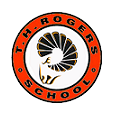
- The logo of the school

Location
- 5840 San Felipe Street; Houston, Texas; United States; 29.750429°N 95.481052°W

Information
- Type: alternative public school
- Motto: Where academics and character matter
- School district: Houston Independent School District
- Principal: Suparna Vashisht
- Staff: 66.07 (FTE)
- Grades: K-grade 8: gifted and talented students Pre-K–grade 8: Deaf students Age 3-Grade 12: Multiply impaired students
- Enrollment: 971 (2017-18)
- Student to teacher ratio: 14.70
- Colors: White and Orange
- Mascot: Ram
- Website: throgers.houstonisd.org www.throgers.org (PTO)
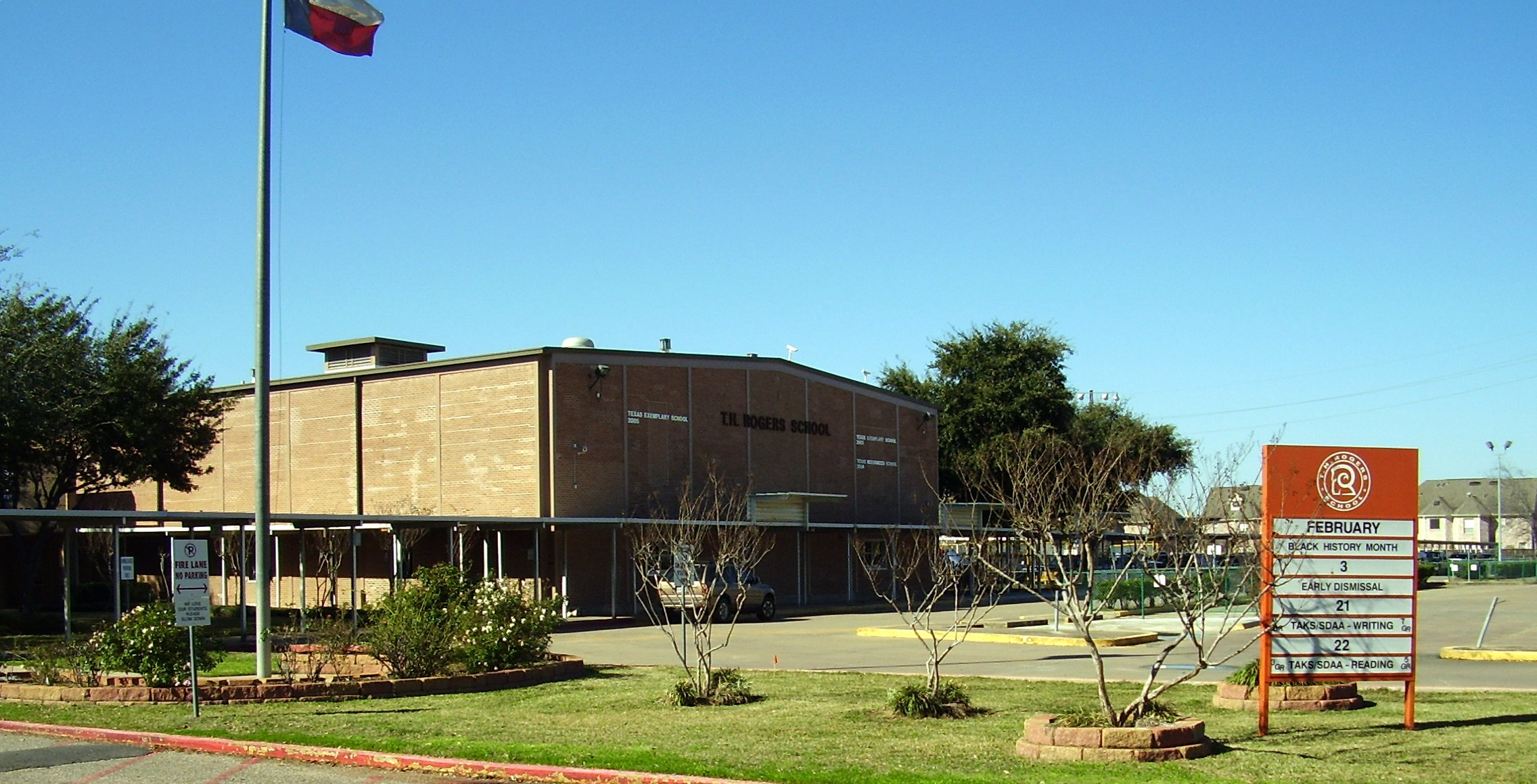

Thomas Horace Rogers School is an alternative primary and secondary public school and part of the Houston Independent School District. The school is at 5840 San Felipe in Houston, Texas, United States, outside of the 610 Loop and inside Beltway 8, west of Uptown Houston.

T. H. Rogers serves students in the Vanguard program from kindergarten through eighth grade and multiply impaired students from age 3 through 12th grade. The school previously served deaf students from pre-Kindergarten through eighth grade, but the program ended prior to the start of the 2021–2022 school year.

== History ==
Opened in 1962, T. H. Rogers was originally a regular middle school that served Uptown area residents. The school was named after Thomas Horace Rogers, who served as the principal of San Jacinto High School Houston, Texas. Rogers died on Valentine's Day, 1954, when police officers, intending to shoot a burglar, instead shot Rogers by mistake. After 1979 T. H. Rogers was no longer a junior high. In 1980 T. H. Rogers was converted into a magnet school. Uptown residents were rezoned to Revere Middle School, but complaints from neighborhood parents that Revere was too far resulted in the re-opening of Grady Elementary School as a middle school in 1992.

In 2009 several teachers advocated for the firing of principal Dr. Cathryn White.

In 2019 the Texas Education Agency (TEA) originally gave the school below an "A" due to the inclusion of the multiply impaired high school students in the testing statistics, but HISD appealed. TEA Commissioner Mike Morath agreed to the appeal and suggested that HISD get a new campus number to reflect this. Therefore, Rogers has an "A" for 2019.

In 2022 HISD leadership proposed relocating students with special education designations to their zoned schools; T. H. Rogers parents were against the proposal and stated that HISD did not ask them about the proposal before announcing it.

== Awards and recognition ==
In 2019 Margaret Downing of the Houston Press stated that Rogers "has been the recipient of several education awards over the years".

T. H. Rogers was named a National Blue Ribbon School in 1991–92. and 2004

In 2005, the fifth grade Odyssey of the Mind (OM) team competed internationally, after winning 4th place in Region and 1st place in Texas. In the World Finals, they took 18th place in their division of 60 teams under the leadership of Linda Hester and Raj Mutha.

In fall 2007 two members of the T. H. Rogers chess team entered the international championships in Antalya, Turkey.

In December 2006, the 8th grade chess team took 1st place at the National Grade Chess Championships in Lake Buena Vista, Florida.

In 2010 the Houston Press ranked T.H. Rogers as Houston's best school.

Named #2 Public Middle School in 2009-2010 and #1 in Houston.

In 2011, the third and fourth grade Odyssey of the Mind team competed in the World Finals after scoring 6th in Region and 2nd in Texas. They got 23rd place in their problem, Extreme Mousemobiles.

In 2013, two 7th grade students won 1st place in district science fair, 1st place in the Houston area science fair, best overall in the Houston area science fair, and 1st place in the Texas State Science fair.

In 2014, the Quiz Bowl Team participated in the Middle School National Championship Tournament (MSNCT), taking 5th place nationally. In 2014, two students participated in the History Bowl Team championship, taking home the Grand Prize (1st place) as well as a check for $5,000.

In 2014, the fifth grade Odyssey of the Mind (OM) team competed internationally, after winning 1st place in Region and 1st place in Texas. They took 16th place at the world finals.

In 2015, the Quiz Bowl Team took 2nd place nationally at the Quiz Bowl Middle School National Championship Tournament (MSNCT).

In 2016, the fifth grade Odyssey of the Mind team competed in the World Finals after winning 1st in Regionals, 1st in State, and ended up winning 10th Place in World.

In 2017, the sixth grade Odyssey of the Mind team competed in the World Finals after winning 2nd in Regionals and 1st in State. They ended up finishing in 21st.

In 2019, the eighth grade Odyssey of the Mind team competed in the World Finals after winning 1st in both Regionals and State. They got 7th place in the world finals, which still remains a school record.

In 2019, the fifth grade Odyssey of the Mind team competed in the World Finals after winning 1st in Regionals and 2nd in State. They got 12th place in the world finals.

In 2022, the Quiz Bowl Team took 8th place nationally at the Quiz Bowl Middle School National Championship Tournament (MSNCT), where also Suhurrith Adhikari won the all-star award for getting top 20 in the tournament.

== Admissions ==
T. H. Rogers has a selective admission process for Vanguard students. At the high school level the school only takes special education students.

T. H. Rogers does not automatically take in students from the surrounding neighborhood; the surrounding neighborhood is zoned to Briargrove Elementary School, Tanglewood Middle School (formerly Grady Middle School), and Wisdom High School (formerly Lee High School), with Lamar High School and Westside High School as options.

== Program for the gifted and talented (Vanguard) ==
The T H Rogers Vanguard Magnet Program centers around developing academic skills, creativity, and leadership in Gifted and Talented (GT) students. Kindergarten – Eighth grade curriculum is taught through an interdisciplinary approach to study reading, writing, mathematics, social studies, and science while emphasizing research and critical thinking skills.

=== Elementary Vanguard ===
T. H. Rogers has approximately 400 Vanguard students in Kindergarten through 5th Grade. In Kindergarten through 4th Grade, each grade has three classes of about 22 students each. In 5th grade, there are three classes of about 26 students each.

T. H. Rogers has departmentalized academic instruction beginning in kindergarten, meaning students split their day among three teachers. Teachers specialize in math, reading or science and social studies.

The Elementary Vanguard academic course work is accelerated, with an emphasis in research and critical thinking skills.

In addition to Vanguard students, T. H. Rogers also houses the Houston Day School for the Deaf, as well as a Multiple Impaired program for students with severe disabilities. Vanguard Elementary students have opportunities for inclusion activities and classroom lessons with other student populations on campus, when possible. Students learn American sign language basics beginning in kindergarten.

=== Middle School Vanguard ===
T. H. Rogers has approximately 390 Vanguard students in 6th - 8th Grade. The 6th Grade cluster includes: 5 core teachers and 149 students at the beginning of the school year. The 7th Grade cluster includes: 4 core teachers, a Foreign Language Teacher, 149 students at the beginning of the school year. The 8th Grade cluster includes: 4 core teachers, a Foreign Language Teacher, 149 students at the beginning of the school year.

Classes are block scheduled and labeled "A" and "B" days. Students have a total of 10 classes; five classes are seen on "A" days, the remaining five are seen on "B" days. Students have eight classes on Mondays. Classes are 85 minutes long. All core classes (English, reading, history, math, and science) are taught at the Pre-Advanced Placement level. On "B" days, all Vanguard Middle School students participate in a 45-minute research class called TPSP(Texas Performance Standards Project). On "A" days, all Vanguard Middle School students have a 45-minute study hall class called homeroom.

Vanguard Middle School students have the opportunity to earn high school credit for: Algebra, Integrated Physics and Chemistry (IPC), Art, Debate and Foreign Language while at T. H. Rogers.

In addition to Vanguard students, T. H. Rogers also houses the Houston Day School for the Deaf, as well as a Multiple Impaired program for students with severe disabilities. Vanguard Middle School students have opportunities for inclusion activities and classroom lessons with other student populations on campus, when possible.

== Program for Preparing Students for Independence (PSI) ==
Preparing Students for Independence (PSI) program serves students aged 3 – 22 whose disabilities severely impair their performance in cognitive and developmental areas. An Admission, Review, and Dismissal (ARD) committee determines if a student's educational needs would be best met in a PSI class.

T.H. Rogers serves students who live in the West Region and whose unique needs cannot be appropriately met in a school closer to their home (as determined by the Office of Special Education).

In 2022 there were plans to abolish the program. Margaret Downing of the Houston Press stated that district administration tried to force the end of the program against parental disapproval. The district ultimately kept the program.

=== Program for Skills for Learning and Living ===
As of 2019 the enrollment of this program was about 25. It serves grades 1–12.

Core academic classes consist of English Language Arts of Life, Reading for Life, Math for Life, science for Life, Social Studies for Life, personal Health for Life, and Vocational Skills for Life for all grade levels.

Sixth through twelfth grade students may participate in Special Olympics Bowling and Track and Field.

Students participate in core enrichment classes, such as Music, Art, and PE. The students are mainstreamed with Vanguard students in as many enrichment classes as possible. Field trips are attended with students in the Vanguard, Middle School Deaf, and PSI programs.

Older high school students may participate in Community Based Vocational Instruction - going off campus to various work sites.

=== Curriculum Design ===
An integrated program developed for each student based on the student's Individual Education program (lEP).

The district adopted Motor Activities Training Program (MATP), a Special Olympics sports skills program to support the development of motor skills.

Collaborative team interaction curriculum approach among the parents, teacher(s), paraprofessional(s) and other service providers.

Additional team members may include a speech and language therapist, occupational therapist, physical therapist, orientation and mobility specialist, and itinerant teacher for students who have auditory or visual impairments. (Eligibility for services by the different professionals is established through the ARD process.)

== PDHH (Program for Deaf and Hard of Hearing) ==
HISD Program for the Deaf and Hard of Hearing at T.H. Rogers served students of all ethnic and socio-economic backgrounds from age 3 through middle school. The program's philosophy is Total Communication which encourages teachers to use an array of materials and resources to help the students reach their maximum potential. A combination of communication methods including, but not limited to, speech, listening, lip reading, Conceptually Accurate Signed English (CASE), ASL, and Visual Phonics are employed. T.H. Rogers has specially trained personnel who are knowledgeable about the hearing impaired and services available to the deaf students. Students in the Program for the Deaf and Hard of Hearing are included with their hearing peers at every opportunity appropriate to best meet their needs:

Approximately 75 students in grades Pre-K through 5th

Instruction in Reading, Language Arts, Mathematics, Science and Social Studies

Core Enrichment classes: Music, Art, Physical Education, Computer Lab, Science Lab, Performing Arts, and Library

Field Trips: Oil Ranch, Interactive Theater, Opera To Go, Houston Zoo, Children's Museum, Museum of Science, Art Museum, George Ranch

Special Events and Activities: Gardening, Natural Habitat, Snow Day with a signing Santa, Halloween Costume Day and Trick or Treating, Field Day, and Rock, Walk and Roll, Glassell School Art teacher, Caring Critters, Fireman Bingham, Special Olympics

Deaf Awareness Week is celebrated with a week of activities designed to increase the knowledge of deafness for the total school body. It culminates in performances by the deaf students.

Each classroom in the Program for the Deaf and Hard of Hearing at T.H. Rogers is equipped with technological equipment including FM systems, televisions, DVDs, computers and Interactive White Boards.

Certified deaf and hearing teachers of the deaf, Audiologists, Speech Therapists, Social Workers, Evaluation Specialists, and Teacher Assistants.

The deaf program was discontinued in 2022. Margaret Downing of the Houston Press wrote that this was done "with little fanfare."

== Student body ==
During the 2009–2010 school year, T.H. Rogers had 379 students in its elementary school program.

- 45% were Asian American
- 23% were Hispanic American
- 17% were White American
- 13% were African American
- 1% was Native American
- 1% had two or more races

35% of its elementary students qualified for free or reduced lunch.

During the 2009–2010 school year, T.H. Rogers had 453 students in its middle and high school programs.

- 39% were Asian American
- 19% were Hispanic American
- 26% were White American
- 14% were African American
- Less than 1% Native American
- 2% two or more races

31% of its secondary students qualified for free or reduced lunch.

During the 2010–2011 school year, T.H. Rogers had 820 students (64 in kindergarten or below).

- 44% were Asian/Pacific Islander
- 22% were Hispanic
- 19% were White
- 13% were African American
- Less than 1% were Native American
- 2% were of mixed race

33% of its students qualified for free or reduced lunch

== After T. H. Rogers ==
T. H. Rogers does not have a zoning boundary, as it serves students from all over Houston ISD.

The deaf program only serves up to the eighth grade at T.H. Rogers; the deaf program is continued for grades 9 through 12 at Milby High School in Houston.

After 8th grade, Vanguard students go on to a variety of high schools with some of the most popular choices being Bellaire High School, Carnegie Vanguard High School, and Debakey High School.

Multiply impaired students stay at T. H. Rogers for their entire K-12 careers.

== Sports ==
T.H. Rogers has the following sports teams:

- Baseball (Spring)
- Basketball (Fall - Winter)
- Soccer (Spring)
- Swimming (Winter)
- Volleyball (Fall)
- Track (Spring)
- Cross country (Fall)

In addition, the school has intramural sports teams during lunch in middle school. In the first 9 weeks there is free play during lunch. Two of the three grades get free play during a single lunch for about 15 minutes. This transitions every day. In the second 9 weeks there is volleyball as the intramural sport. In the third nine weeks there is basketball as the intramural sport. Lastly, in the fourth 9 weeks there is dodgeball.

== Weekend programs ==
Starting October 14, 2013, a class in American sign language for adults organized by Be An Angel was offered at T. H. Rogers. The teacher establishing the classes believed that 15-20 students would enroll; the initial number of prospective students in fact exceeded 200.

Previously the Japanese Educational Institute of Houston (JEI, ヒューストン日本語教育振興会 Hyūsuton Nihongo Kyōiku Shinkō Kai) held Japanese classes for American students at T.H. Rogers. As of 1986 HISD offered weekend Japanese classes for American students in conjunction with the JEI, which also operated a supplementary school for Japanese students, the Japanese Language Supplementary School of Houston.
