= Houston Country Club =

Country club in Houston, Texas

Coordinates: 29.763°N 95.489°W

- Interactive map of Houston Country Club

Club information
- Location: Houston, Texas; United States
- Established: 1908
- Type: Private
- Total holes: 18
- Website: Houston Country Club
- Designed by: Tom McNamara – 1908; Robert T. Jones – 1956 (re-design)
- Par: 72
- Length: 6,996 yd (6,397 m) Longest hole is #12 - 597 yd (546 m)
- Course rating: 72.9
- Slope rating: 122

The Houston Country Club is a country club in the Tanglewood area of Houston, Texas.

== History ==
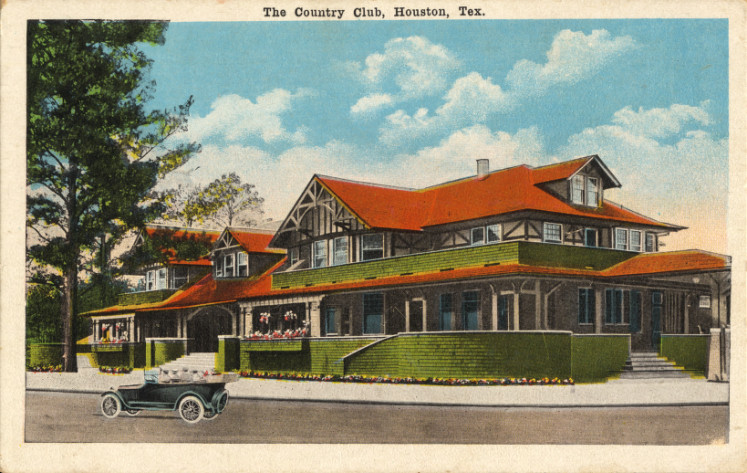
Clubhouse of the original Houston Country Club (1908-1924)

Following the success of the first golf club organized in Houston (a nine-hole course built on 45 acres of land leased from Rice University west of the city) the Houston Country Club was chartered in 1908. Under its first president William M. Rice Jr. it purchased and developed an 18-hole course southeast of downtown Houston on 152 acres. The country club moved to its current Tanglewood location in 1957. The former Houston Country Club was renamed the Houston Executive Club.

The City of Houston purchased the Houston Executive Club in 1972 and renamed it the Gus Wortham Golf Course. Claudia Feldman of the Houston Chronicle said that in the 1960s Tanglewood residents mainly went to Houston Country Club exclusively, and that this was an example of the community's "clubby atmosphere".

George H. W. Bush, a Tanglewood resident, often played golf and tennis at the club. In the early 1960s Bush first met James A. Baker and Robert Mosbacher while playing tennis at the Houston Country Club. In the 1970s Bush and Baker's friendship progressed as they played tennis doubles. Bush and Baker were the winners of the club's tennis doubles championships.

Around 1993 the Houston Country Club and some other area country clubs began claiming a new tax break. As of 2018, the Houston Country Club has a waiting list of people who wish to enter the club.

== See also ==
- River Oaks Country Club
- Royal Oaks Country Club
