= Briargrove, Houston =

Neighborhood in Houston, Texas, United States

Coordinates: 29.744°N 95.493°W

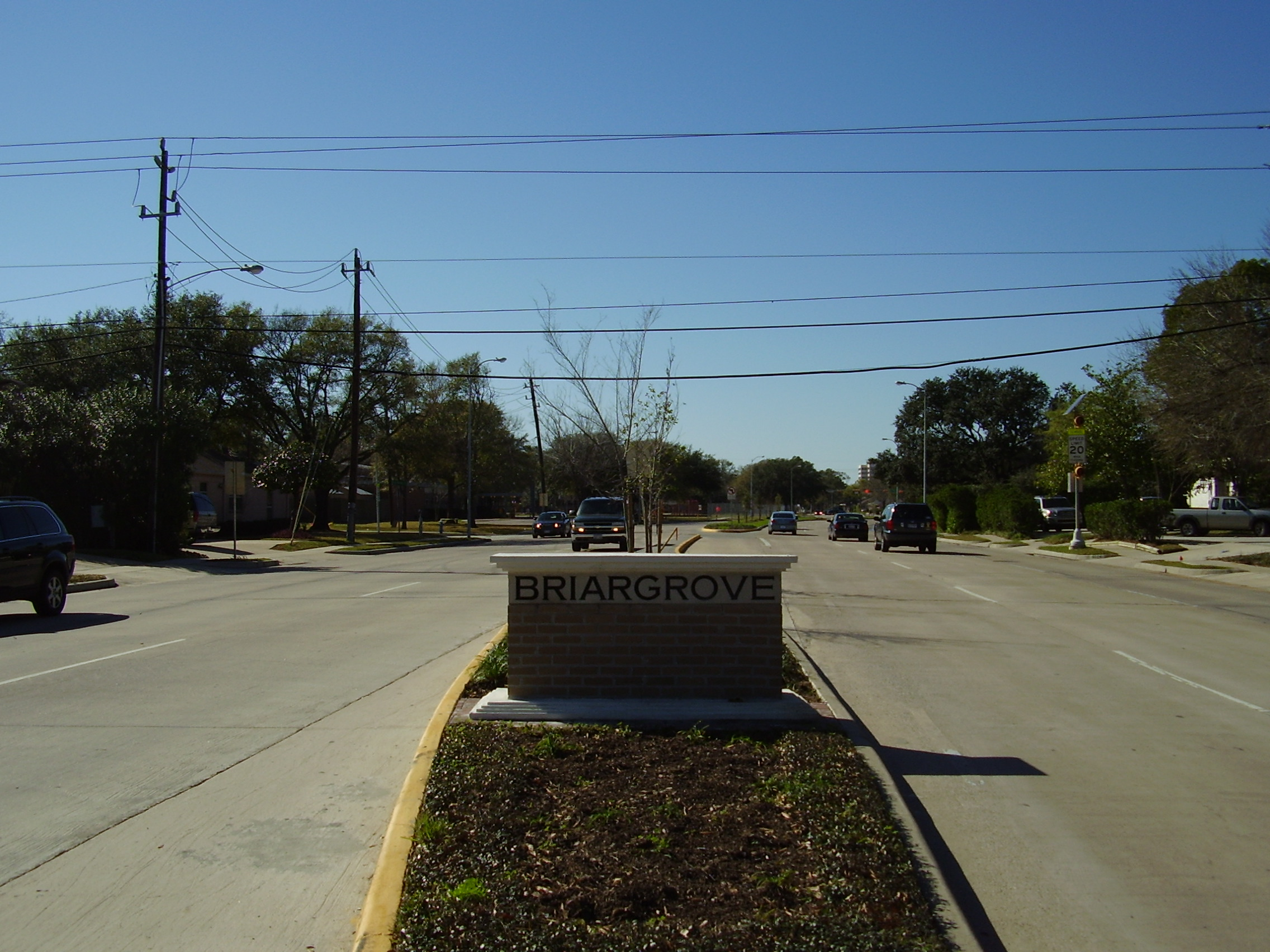
A sign marking Briargrove

Briargrove is a neighborhood in Houston, Texas, United States, near Uptown Houston.

Briargrove was established in the 1950s with one-story ranch homes built in the 1950s and 1960s. Deed restrictions in the neighborhood were modified in 1986 to allow for 1 1/2-story and two-story homes. Afterwards some of the older ranch homes were torn down and replaced with newer 2-story homes.

== Government ==
The Harris Health System (formerly Harris County Hospital District) designated the Valbona Health Center (formerly the People's Health Center) for the ZIP code 77057. The designated public hospital is Ben Taub General Hospital in the Texas Medical Center.

=== Federal and state representation ===
Briargrove is in Texas's 7th congressional district.

== Fire service ==
Houston Fire Department operates Station 2 at 5880 Woodway at Chimney Rock, across from Tanglewood Park.

== Police service ==
The neighborhood is served by the Houston Police Department's District 18 Patrol Division.

== Education ==
=== Public schools ===
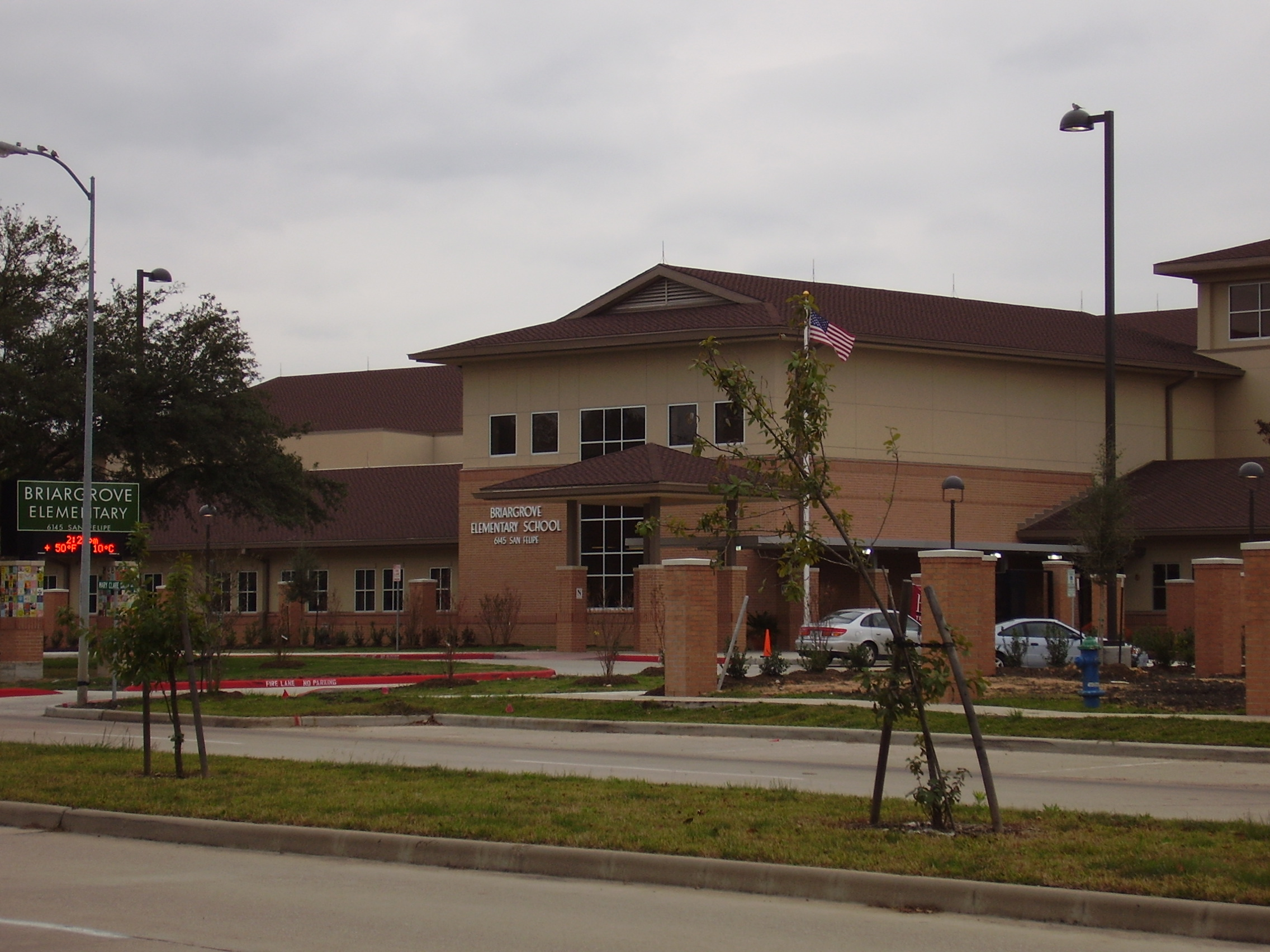
Briargrove Elementary School

Briargrove's public schools are operated by Houston ISD. The community is within Trustee District VII, represented by Anne Sung.

Briargrove is zoned to Briargrove Elementary School and Tanglewood Middle School (formerly Grady Middle School). Briargrove residents are zoned to Margaret Long Wisdom High School (formerly Robert E. Lee High School) and may choose to attend Lamar High School or Westside High School.

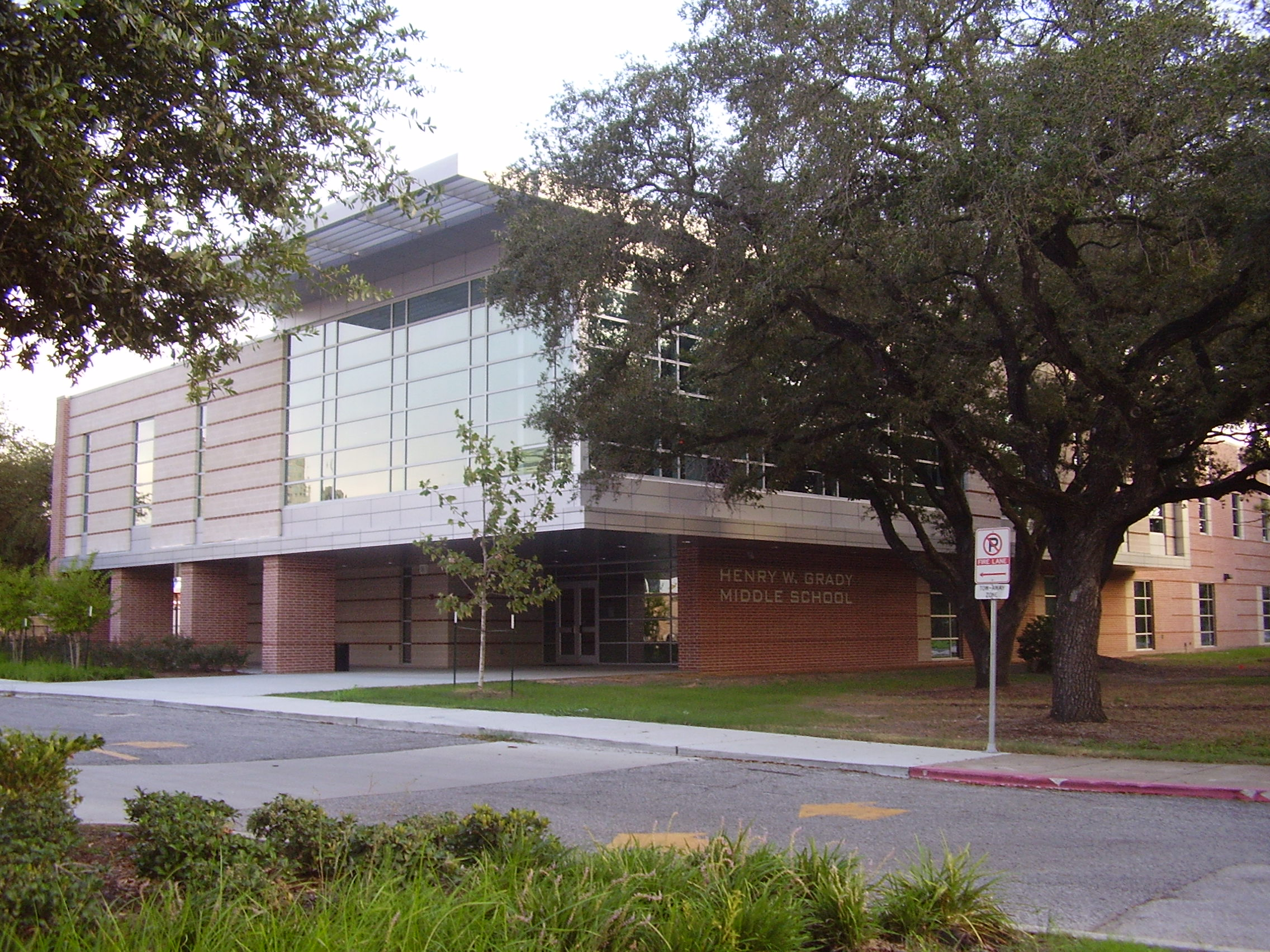
Grady Middle School

The current 93,500-square-foot (8,690 m^{2}) Briargrove Elementary School, with a capacity for about 850 students and designed by FKP Architects and built by Heering International Inc., had a cost of about $16 million. The campus divides multiple classes into "pods". The driveway and 60 parking spaces are to the rear of the campus.

Residents of the Briargrove Elementary School attendance zone may apply for the Briarmeadow Charter School. Mark White Elementary School is scheduled to open in August 2016. Residents of the Briargrove Elementary zone, along with those of the Pilgrim, Piney Point, and Emerson zones, will be allowed to apply to this school. Even though several wealthier neighborhoods such as Tanglewood and Briargrove are primarily zoned to Wisdom, As of 2010 parents there prefer to send their children to Lamar, Westside, private high schools, or charter high schools.

The T.H. Rogers School, an alternative K-12 school for gifted and talented students, deaf students, and multiply impaired students, is nearby Briargrove. In 1982 T. H. Rogers, which previously served as a neighborhood middle school, was converted into a magnet school due to low enrollment. Uptown residents were rezoned to Revere Middle School, but there were complaints from neighborhood parents that stated that Revere was too far; this resulted in the re-opening of Grady as a middle school in 1992.

=== Private schools ===
St. Michael School, a Roman Catholic K-8 school that is a part of the Archdiocese of Galveston-Houston, is in the area.

Al-Hadi School of Accelerative Learning, a private K-12 Islamic school, is in the area.

Awty International School, a K-12 international school, is in Spring Branch; it has a French curriculum accredited by the French government and an IB curriculum accredited by the International Baccalaureate.

=== Public libraries ===
The Houston Public Library Jungman Branch is in the area.

== Parks ==
The city of Houston operates the Tanglewood Park at 5801 Woodway and the Grady Park at 1700 Yorktown.

== Media ==
The Houston Chronicle is the area regional newspaper.

The Memorial Examiner is a local newspaper distributed in the community.

The Memorial Buzz, one of four magazines produced by The Buzz Magazines, is a monthly publication about people, products and services in the community. It is mailed free of charge to all residents the first week of each month.

== Community information ==
The closest first-run movie theater is the Edwards Theatres Grand Palace 24 and AMC Studio 30.

The closest YMCA to Briargrove is the Trotter Family YMCA.
