= Margaret Long Wisdom High School =

Location
- 6529 Beverly Hill Ln; Houston, Texas 77057-6406; United States; 29.72969°N 95.49993°W

Information
- Type: Public, Secondary
- Motto: "Be the Good in the World"
- Established: 1962
- School district: Houston Independent School District - District 18-6A
- Principal: Reginald Bush
- Staff: 129.28 (FTE)
- Grades: 9–12
- Enrollment: 2,306 (2023–2024)
- Student to teacher ratio: 17.84
- Campus: Urban
- Colors: Black & Gold
- Mascot: General
- Newspaper: The Wisdom Chronicle
- Yearbook: Saber
- Feeder schools: Jane Long Academy; Pershing Middle School; Pin Oak Middle School; Others listed below
- Website: wisdom.houstonisd.org
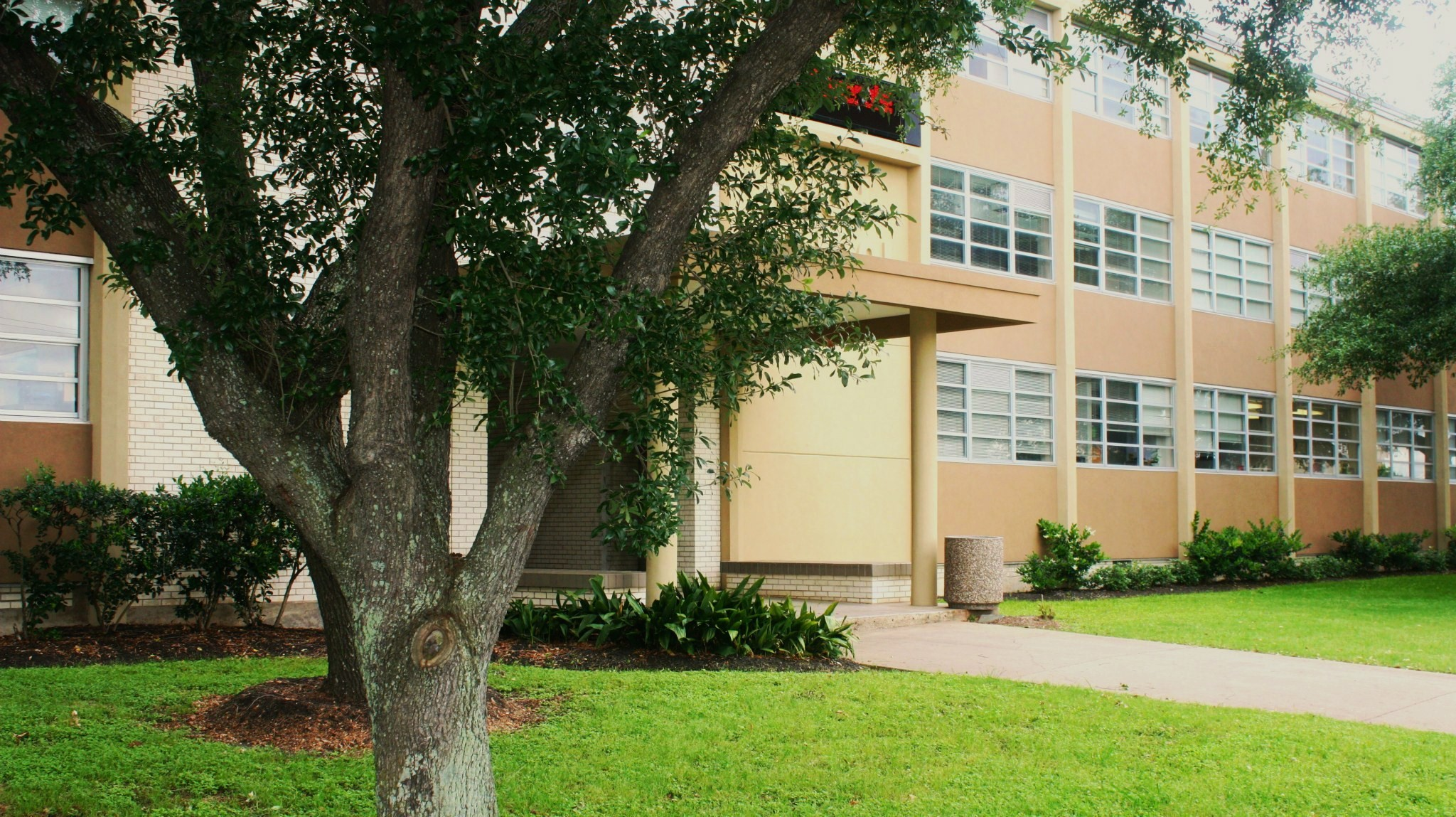
- The front of the school after its 2012 renovation

Margaret Long Wisdom High School (formerly Robert E. Lee High School) is a publicly funded secondary school located in Southwest Houston, Texas, United States. It is part of the Houston Independent School District, the seventh largest school district in the United States.

Wisdom is a public admission school and enrolls grades 9 through 12 (ages 14–18). The school serves the neighborhoods of Uptown, Briargrove, Westchase, and Gulfton areas of the city of Houston.

The school is named after teacher Margaret Long "Tiny" Wisdom (October 2, 1922–November 16, 2006).

== History ==
=== Early history ===
Wisdom High School was originally Robert E. Lee Senior High School, named after Robert E. Lee. It opened in 1962 to relieve high attendance at Lamar and Bellaire High Schools. Lee's first principal, Woodrow Watts, was previously the principal of Lamar. After its opening, Lee became Lamar's primary athletic rival. At that time, Lee High School had a white and mostly affluent and suburban student body.

For its first 25 years, Robert E. Lee High School built a comprehensive suburban high school, drawing students primarily from Afton Oaks, Tanglewood, Briargrove, Briarcroft/Briarmeadow, and Rivercrest/Briargrove Park/Walnut Bend neighborhoods, all south of Buffalo Bayou.

The United Daughters of the Confederacy's Robert E. Lee chapter 186 supported the school in its early years; it donated portraits of Lee, gave American Civil War-related books to the library, and gave the school a rebel flag. The school's symbol is the Lee family coat of arms, which has a squirrel on the top holding a nut.

=== Post-1980s ===
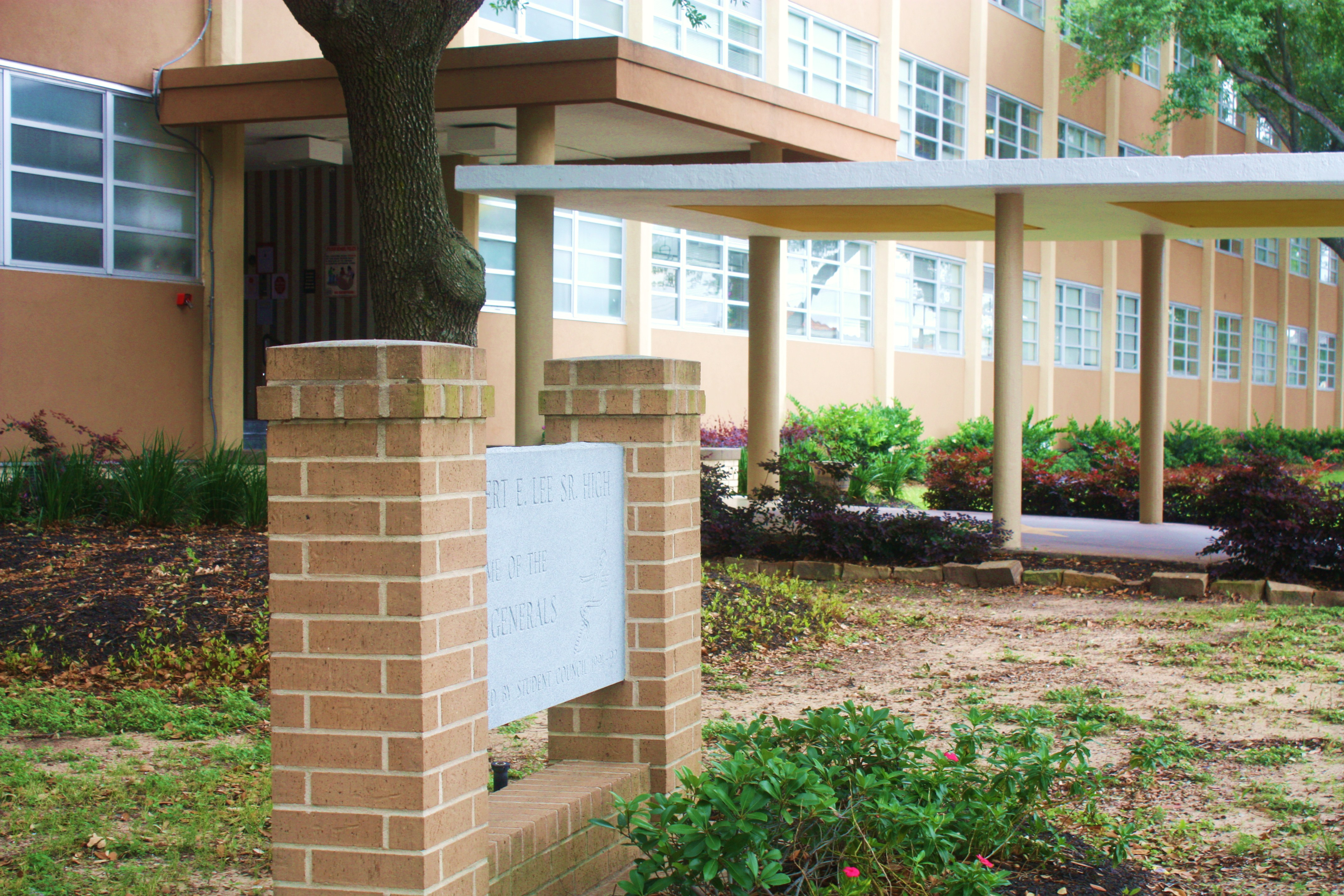
The official Lee High School Entrance.

As times changed, the demographic of Lee's student body shifted. As of 2008, it was made up predominantly of first- and second-generation Hispanic immigrants. Lee's multi-ethnic population changes parallel Houston's immigration waves, beginning with the Vietnamese families in the early 1980s. With the change in apartment housing rules in the 1980s, both the community and the school population changed. The demographic of Lee's student body shifted significantly in the 1990s, as Hispanic students from the south zone (Gulfton area) became the overwhelming majority of the student body. Lee became one of the largest 5A high schools in the region by the late 1990s.

From 1990 to 1991, Yvonne Gonzalez, later a school superintendent, served as Lee's principal.

Stacey Childress, author of Transforming Public Education: Cases in Education Entrepreneurship, wrote that in the mid-1990s Lee "was one of Houston's most feared schools" due to the surrounding area having one of the highest rates of juvenile crime in the state and the school having the lowest rate of English fluency in Houston.

Lee's student body was relieved of about 1,000 students when Westside High School, about 7 miles (11 km) west of Lee, opened in 2000, removing the last significant numbers of middle-class students and non-Hispanic White students.

Around 2000 the school dropped "Robert E." from its name, removed its portraits of Robert E. Lee, and changed its logo to a four-point, star-bodied person. Principal Steve Amstutz said around that year, "People think we stole it from Cingular." The star in the logo juggles 10 balls, representing the school's 10 learning communities established around that year. The learning communities were part of a $68 million Houston ISD initiative to personalize and improve high schools throughout the district, reflecting a national trend of personalizing education in high schools.

Newcomer Charter High School (as of 2007, known as Liberty High School) was opened in January 2005 and housed in Lee High School. In 2006 it was scheduled to move into a new campus at 6400 Southwest Freeway (U.S. Highway 59).

According to Houston ISD's October 2006 "For Your Information" newsletter, Lee was one of four high schools that took the most refugees from Hurricane Katrina.

In the 2005–2006 school year, Houston ISD was required to provide free tutoring to low-income students at Lee because for three consecutive years, Lee did not meet the academic targets set by the federal No Child Left Behind act. 2,912 students at Lee High School, Marshall Middle School, and Kay On-Going Education Center qualified for the tutoring. The tutoring, which covered the Texas Assessment of Knowledge and Skills (TAKS), began on February 4, 2006. On the three campuses, 74 students (3% of the eligible students) enrolled in the tutoring program. Mercedes Alejandro of the group Parents for Public Schools accused Houston ISD of not effectively communicating that the tutoring was available to the communities at the schools.

In 2007, a study by Johns Hopkins University and the Associated Press referred to Lee among American high schools designated as "dropout factories," where at least 40% of the entering freshman class does not make it to their senior year.

In the summer of 2007, YES Prep Lee—a charter middle school—began leasing space on the third floor of Lee High School, paying $65,000 annually. YES Prep intended to grow its school to around 700 students in grades 6 through 12 with 30 classrooms. YES and charter officials wanted state officials to pass a bill allowing schools occupying the same campus to share test scores; the bill failed.

In 2008, Bill Gates and Melinda Gates visited Lee and YES Prep.

In December 2009, YES Prep relocated all 400 students in the Lee program, and in January 2010 the board of YES Prep voted to terminate its partnership with Lee High School. YES Prep Lee is now called YES Prep Gulfton.

In 2010, Amstutz stopped being the principal of Lee but continued to be an employee of Houston ISD. Houston ISD did not state whether his departure was voluntary or involuntary. Paul Castro from Westside High School was transferred to become the new principal of Lee High School. Mimi Swartz of Texas Monthly described Castro as "popular and successful." However, he resigned after only three months, reportedly (again from Swartz) because Houston ISD superintendent Terry Grier "was dismissive of [Castro] during a meeting." In April 2010 Grier announced that he had an improvement plan for Lee. Xochitl Rodriguez-Davila was promoted from Houston ISD's Stonewall Jackson Middle School leader to Lee's 18th principal (its 14th since 1990) in July 2010. During that summer Newsweek ranked Lee among "America's Best High Schools."

The Houston ISD board voted to give the school its current name in 2016.

The school was featured on Anthony Bourdain: Parts Unknown, and principal Jonathan Trinh gave an interview on that show.

In 2019, Michelle Wagner became the principal.

In 2022, there were conflicts between students of Afghan origin and those with origins in Latin America.

== Facility ==
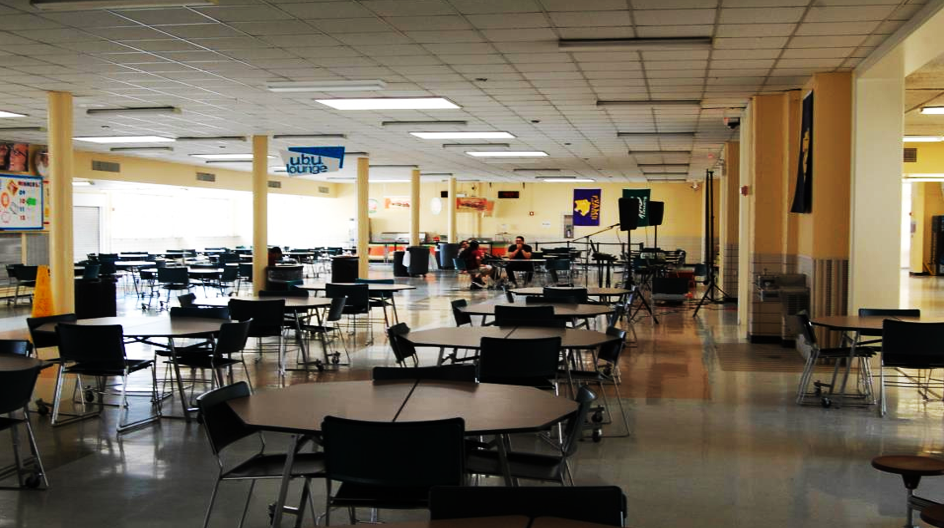
The current WHS indoor Cafeteria eating area.

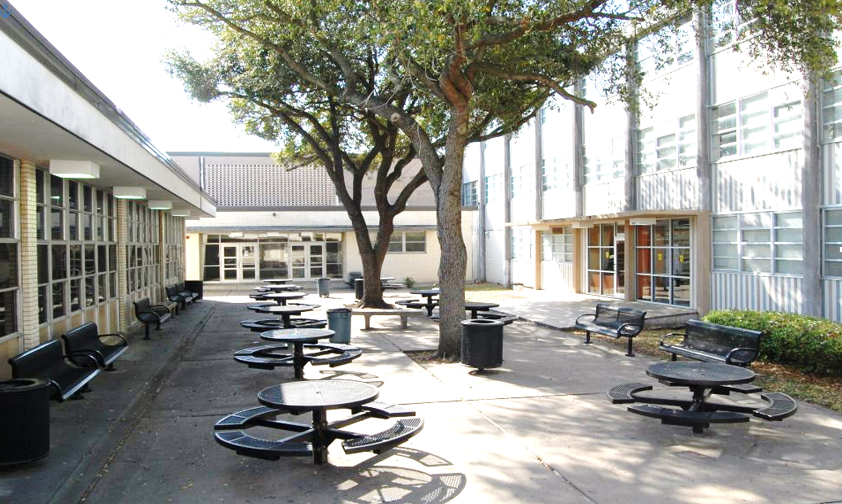
The current WHS outdoor Cafeteria eating area.

In 2010 Lisa Falkenberg said "The Lee of today, with its crumbling façade and graffiti on nearby buildings, is far from the glistening school on the prairie that opened in 1962 to relieve overcrowding at prestigious Lamar High." As of 2010, one of the brick façades outside one of the entrances had bricks missing. Lisa Falkenberg of the Houston Chronicle said that it was "left to gape like a toothless mouth for the past eight years." After Xochitl Rodriguez-Davila was hired as the Lee principal, she arranged a campus facelift.

During that year, Houston ISD reported that two distinct portions of the 49-year-old main school building's foundation are sinking into the ground at different rates.

However, with the passing of the 2012 Bond Proposition, Lee would become one of the first campuses to receive a new school building as soon as 2016. A new building would relieve many of the conflicts Lee was facing, similar to when Westside High School was established in 2000.

== Student body ==
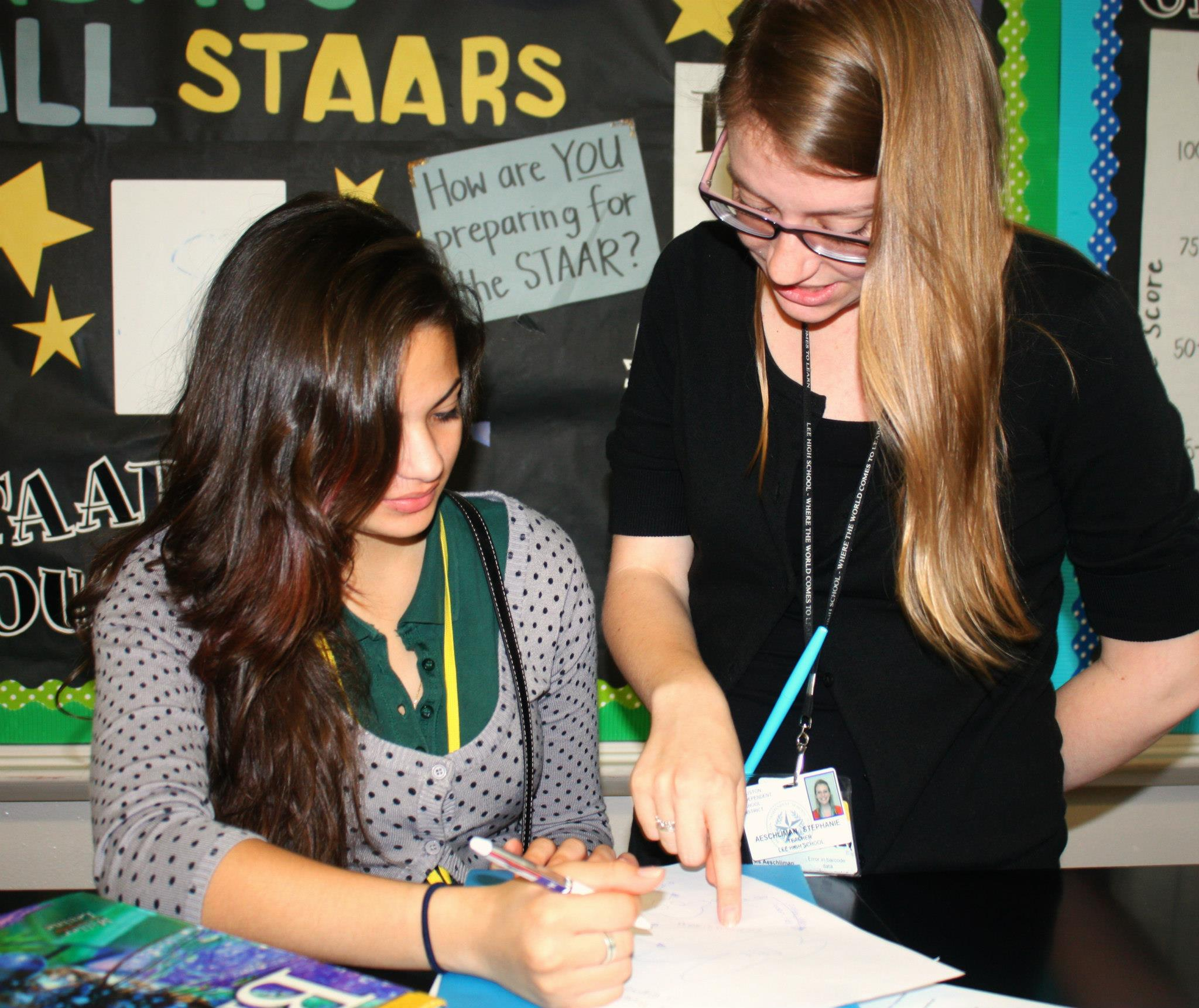
A student during Biology class getting an explanation about the process of Cell Respiration

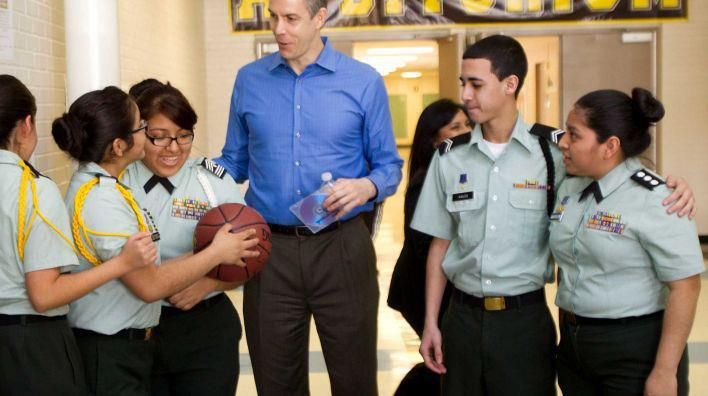
Students from many different countries greet U.S. Secretary of Education Arne Duncan as he stopped by Lee High School to compliment on the success it has received in its educational status as an inner city high school.

Wisdom High School had 2,260 students during the 2022–23 school year. They are drawn largely from its attendance zone, whose borders are Bellaire Boulevard, Gessner Road, Buffalo Bayou, and IH 610 West. A smaller percentage of magnet students come from multiple other zones within the Houston ISD boundaries. The ethnic diversity breakdown of the 2022–23 student body is:

- 6.5% White American
- 8.6% Asian American
- 71.8% Hispanic American
- 12.5% African American
- 0.2% Native American

In 2022–23, 97% of the student body qualified for free or reduced breakfast and lunch under federal poverty guidelines. As of 2015, 96% of the students were classified as low-income.

In the 1960s and 1970s, Lee's student body consisted of affluent White Americans. These demographics continued into the 1980s and early 1990s, with students primarily coming from upper-middle and upper class affluent families. Some of the biggest names in Houston society attended or had children attending the school. Football, cheerleading, and country club sports such as swimming, tennis, and golf were significant draws with numerous awards, records, and All-American recognition. In fact, Lee was privileged to be one of only a handful of schools with an on-campus, competition-size swimming pool. Enrollment hovered around the 6,500 mark. Principal Steve Amstutz stated in 2003 that Lee's student body was "a sea of white faces. They all looked like me." In the early 1990s there were almost 2,500 students, and about 25% were classified as low-income.

As the school matured, the demographics of the students changed. By 1999 Lee was so overcrowded that many students had to use air conditioning units as chairs. Around that time, half of any given ninth grade class would not make it to 12th grade. Students fought in the hallways daily. The opening of Westside High School in 2000 removed the last significant numbers of White and upper-income students, causing the school to refocus to cater to its new population. By 2013 there were 1,416 students, with almost 33% being English learners and almost 80% being classified as low-income.

In 2010 Lee's Houston ISD school board trustee, Harvin Moore, said, "There is no high school in Houston that has a more unique and difficult challenge with respect to a significant portion of the children who attend there," citing the concentration of older immigrant students who come from third world countries and often lack basic education. Monica Rhor of the Houston Chronicle wrote that in 2015 many of Lee's students "are coping with problems at home." The school provides a weekend lunch program to give students meals on days when school does not operate.

=== National origins and languages ===
In a 2003 article by the Houston Press, Amstutz stated, referring to the "Hispanic" designation, "But that covers from Nuevo Laredo to Tierra del Fuego. We're from the top of Mexico to the south of Argentina. And I've got kids from everywhere in between." Amstutz said in a 2002 article that "Sometimes I can lose a whole country in a day, other times I can gain one." Lisa Falkenberg said in 2010 that Lee was a school "where being Rwandan isn't 'weird.'"

As of 2010 over 40 languages were spoken by the Lee High School student body, and the number of English language learners—over 700—was higher than the entire populations of some high schools in the area. As of that year, half of the Houston ISD students zoned to Lee did not attend that school.

As of 2017 about 46% of the student body had recently immigrated to the United States.

== Student dress and school uniform ==
Lee High School requires students to wear a school uniform. All students wear blue or black jeans (without holes), khaki pants, shorts, or skirts, and a solid polo-style shirt. Each grade wears a different color shirt: freshman wear forest green, sophomores wear gray, juniors wear maroon, and seniors wear yellow.

On Fridays, students have the option of wearing a university/college t-shirt or a Lee High School club shirt (only). Additionally, at the end of each month, seniors can opt to dress professionally on a designated day.

The Texas Education Agency specifies that the parents and/or guardians of students zoned to a school with uniforms may apply for a waiver to opt out of the uniform policy so their children do not have to wear the uniform. Parents must specify "bona fide" reasons, such as religious reasons or philosophical objections.

Some teachers who worked at Lee after the student population became mostly Hispanic recalled that some members of gangs who were enrolled at Lee openly wore gang colors and other gang insignia while on campus.

== Student discipline ==
Around 1990, according to Strong Families Strong Schools: Building Community Partnerships for Learning, the school had a "serious gang problem." The school adopted a "zero tolerance for gangs" policy. A committee of 10 people, including Houston Police Department security guards, Houston ISD administrators, and Lee administrators and teachers identified possible gang members and evicted any who were identified as violent. A group of administrators and teachers also worked to properly identify gang members and avoid misidentifying a student who would participate in a gang due to alienation if they are misidentified. In addition, the City of Houston established a school day curfew with fines for parents of children truant from school. Lee's Texas Assessment of Academic Skills (TAAS) scores were still considered "low-performing" by the Texas Education Agency in 1993, but had increased over a three-year period ending around 1994. Strong Families Strong Schools: Building Community Partnerships for Learning argued that the TAAS score increase is evidence that "things are turning around" and "the climate of the school has changed dramatically."

== Academic environment ==
In 2010 Lisa Falkenberg of the Houston Chronicle said of Lee: "Lee High School isn't your typical failing school. In one campus, its students seem to personify every major socio-economic problem and demographic challenge facing urban schools today. At the same time, it's a petri dish for academic innovation, full of Stand and Deliver-type successes." During that year she also said "The school is flailing in a test-driven accountability system blind to extenuating circumstances like poverty, pregnancy, 30 percent student turnover, and 780 students out of 1,850 considered "English language learners."" Lee High School U.S. Army(JROTC) program has re-emerged as a force, improving from 24th to 7th place, out of the 25 HISD Army based student programs. Successful, statewide award winning distributive teaching programs in Metal-fabrication and Woodworking have been built in recent years, as well.

In 2010, Lee had improved its state mandated TAKS test scores significantly, yet was named academically "unacceptable" by the TEA, due to its 30% dropout rate. As a result of 3+ years of this designation, it became one of the HISD "Apollo 20" laboratory schools. It was subject to the Texas Education Agency (TEA) "turnaround" model for reforming schools in jeopardy of closing, including replacing the administration and much of the existing faculty. As of 2010 the think tank "Children at Risk" ranked Lee as one of the most improved high schools in Greater Houston. As of 2015 the STAAR exam failure rate at Lee was about 70%.

When Lee began as a high school, all of its foreign language activities occurred in the "Language Lab" area.

== AP/Magnet Program ==
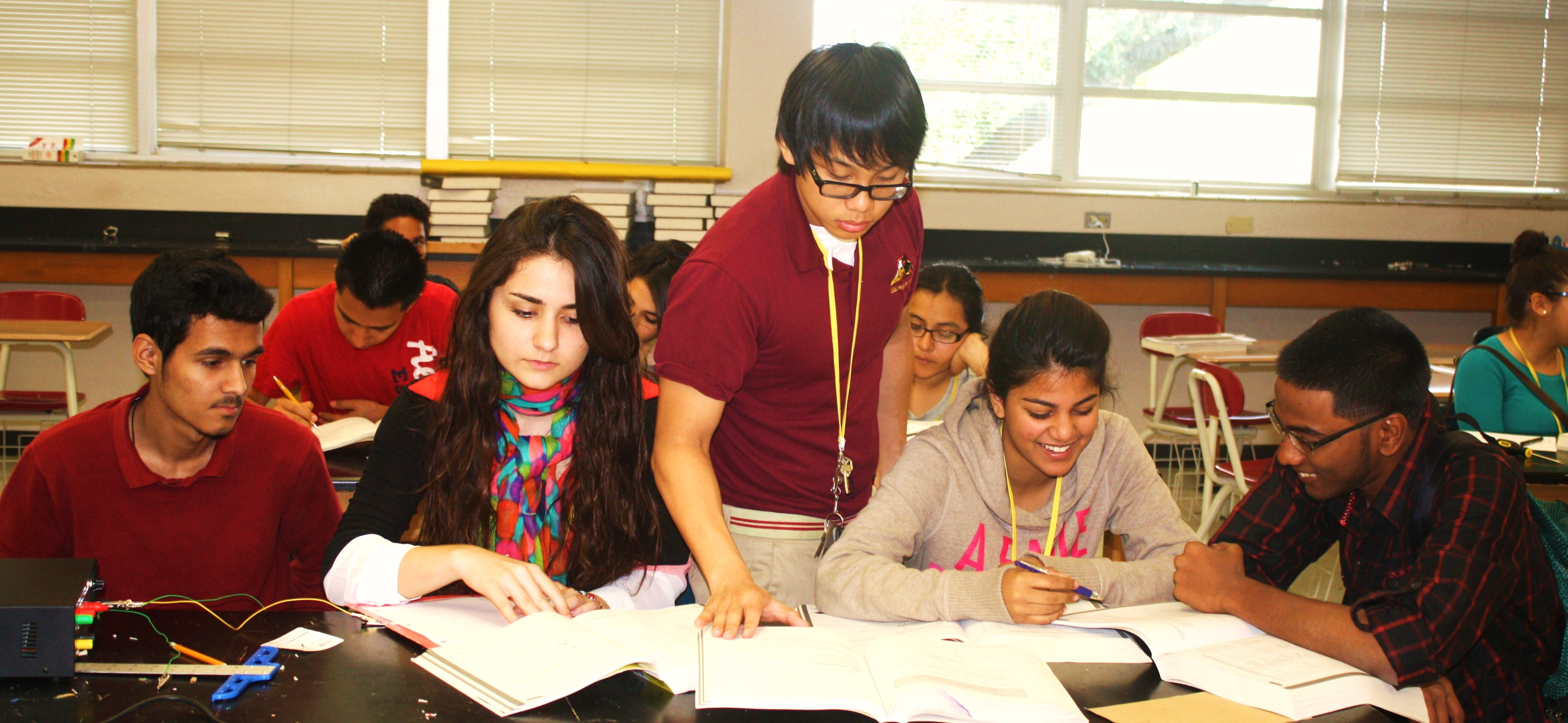
Lee High School Juniors during an AP Physics class getting prepared for their upcoming AP exams.

Wisdom High School administers an advanced placement curriculum, where high performing students take college level classes while in high school and earn college level credits. The number of students taking AP courses and exams has increased dramatically since the AP Program was re-introduced at Lee. A March 2009 Houston Chronicle article stated that the student body took approximately 550 AP tests; eight times the number taken in 2004. In June 2010, Newsweek magazine ranked Lee #151 out of over 16,000 schools nationwide, acknowledging it among "America's Best High Schools" for its number of students taking AP tests. Jason Spencer of the Houston Chronicle called the ranking a "head scratcher," since prior to the announcement of the ranking the HISD administration had forced 160 teachers at Lee and other schools to leave due to low performance. Thompson explained that the ranking system, which divides all of the AP exams taken by the total number of students, is "freakishly simplistic" since it does not take into account performance during the AP exams. The ranking done by the think tank "Children at Risk" that year placed Lee in number 133 out of 140 high schools. Responding to the Newsweek ranking, HISD superintendent Terry Grier said "The efforts at Lee High School to encourage more students to take college-level courses are to be commended. We must raise the level of achievement for all students, and it is for this reason that we will be initiating the Apollo 20 project at Lee in the next school year. We will continue to build on the work you and your colleagues have done so that we can ensure that every child in our school district receives a quality education that will prepare him or her for college and career success."

There are a number of advanced, college prep Advanced Placement courses taught at Lee, including:

AP World History: Modern
AP U.S. History
AP U.S. Government & Politics
AP Macroeconomics
AP English Language and Composition
AP English Literature and Composition
AP Calculus AB
AP Calculus BC
AP Chemistry
AP Statistics
AP Studio Art
AP Spanish Language and Culture
AP Spanish Literature and Culture
AP French Language and Culture
AP Biology
AP Environmental Science
AP Physics B

In May 2010, 300 students signed up to take approximately 800 AP tests, with increases in exemplary scores in AP US Government, AP Macroeconomics, and AP Calculus across the board.

The school is divided into 4 academies, paralleling grades 9–12, each managed by an assistant principal. There is an additional academy for non-English speaking students and 9th graders in need of ESL or additional math or English tutoring.

== Electives, clubs and organizations ==
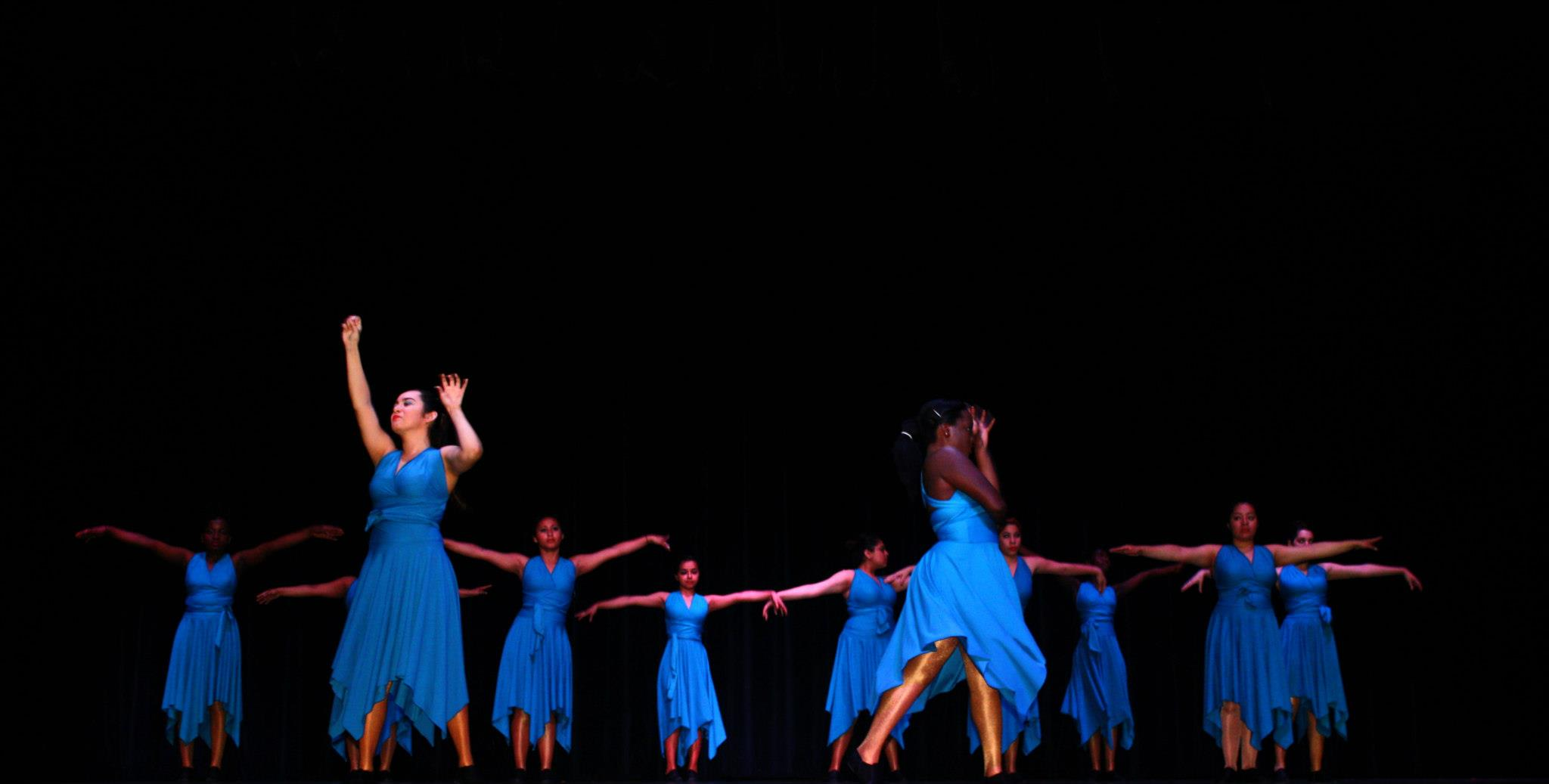
The May 2013 Lee High School Dance Show.

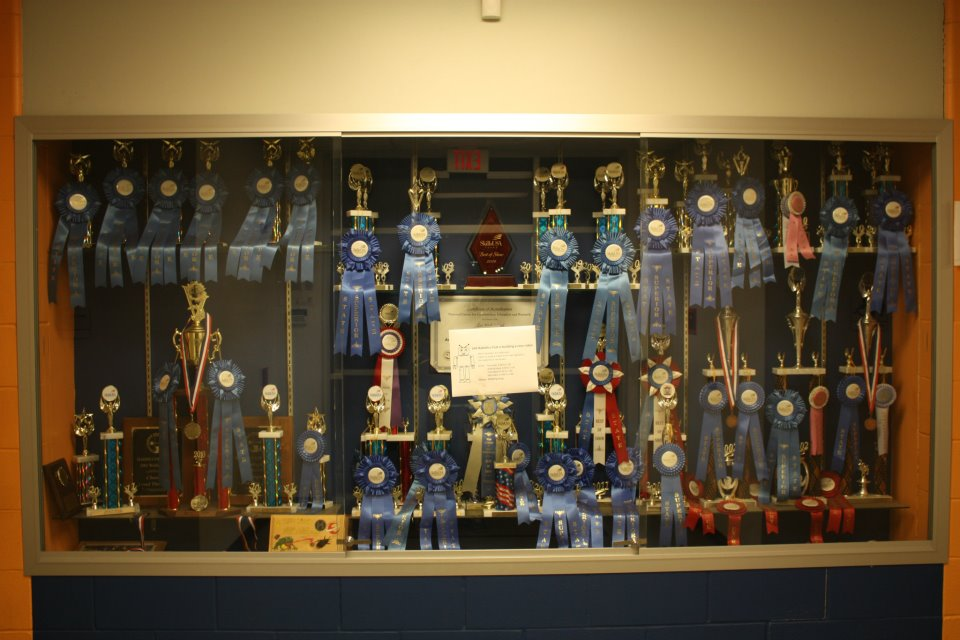
The Skills USA State Awards in the Welding and Woodshop areas of the school.

From 1962 to 2000, Lee had student service organizations, including Pilot Club for Women's Anchor Club, Galleria Area Rotary Club's "Interact," and Kiwanis Club's Key Club. Marla Morrow, a former student quoted in Education Week, said that prospective members of the Key Club were required to reproduce the financial statements of their parents.

== Athletics ==
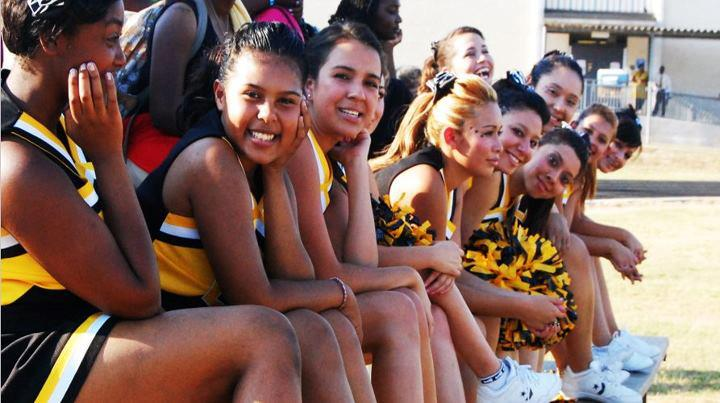
The Lee High School Cheerleaders enjoying a home football game.

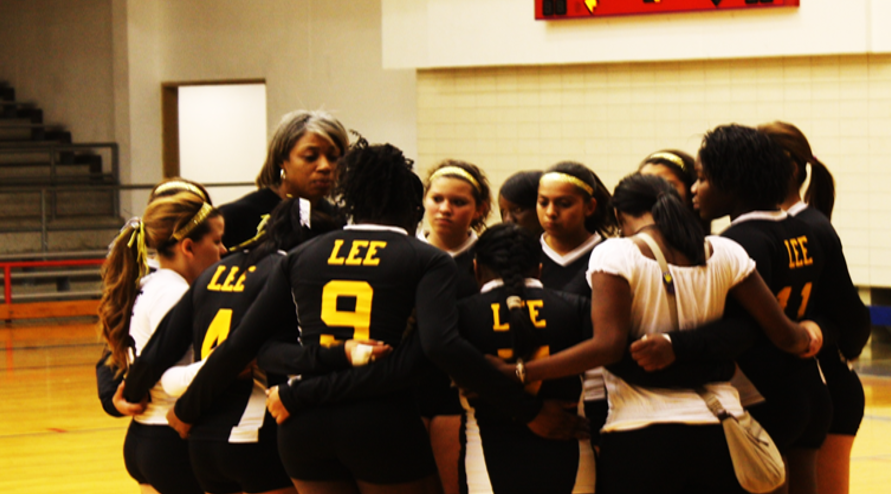
The Lee High School Volleyball Team planning against their rival team.

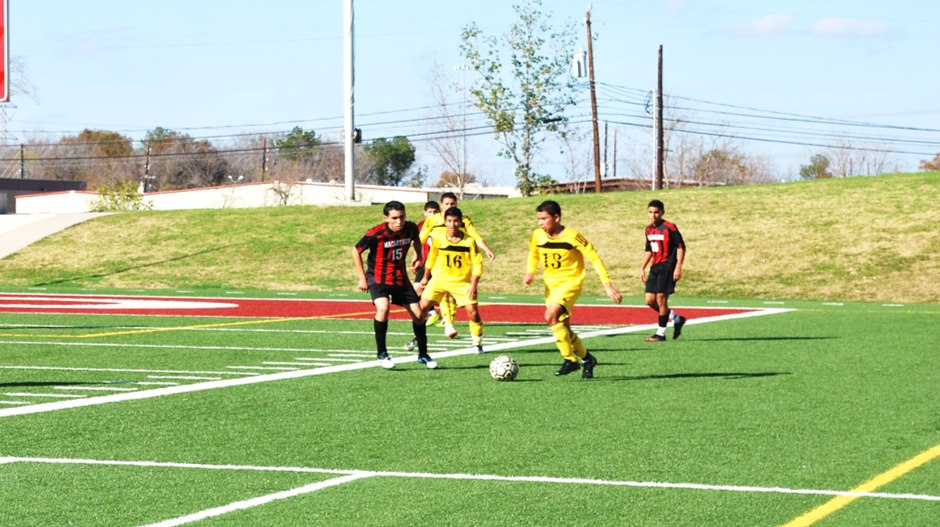
The Lee High School, more than 5 Time District Champions, Varsity Soccer Team.

Robert E. Lee HS currently plays a full complement of UIL girls and boys varsity sports in District 21-4A, along with HISD's Waltrip, Davis, Yates, Sharpstown, Reagan, & Austin High Schools. Lee has alternated as a 4A and 5A school throughout its 50-year history, playing in 19-4A, 18-4A,17-4A,18-5A, 21-5A, and the current 20-5A district. It plays Men's varsity soccer in UIL District 20-5A, where it is the 2011 District Champions.

Robert E. Lee Varsity sports teams include:

- Baseball (club)
- Basketball (Girls)
- Basketball (Boys)
- Cross Country (Girls)
- Cross Country (Boys)
- Varsity Cheerleading (Co-ed)
- JV Cheerleading (Girls)
- Varsity Football (Co-ed)
- JV Football (Boys)
- Dance/ Drill
- Track & Field (Co-ed)
- Varsity Volleyball (Girls)
- JV Volleyball
- Wrestling (Co-ed)
- Soccer (Girls)
- Soccer (Boys)
- Softball (Girls)
- Swimming (Co-ed)

In previous eras the school used a statue called "Uncle Bob," a depiction of Robert E. Lee, as a mascot. During these previous eras, students affectionately referred to the school as "Bobby Lee Tech."

In previous eras the primary athletic rival was Lamar High School. American football games were the primary outlet of this rivalry, but it manifested itself in other ways; in 1975 Gregory Curtis of the Texas Monthly wrote that "the respective Key Clubs know year by year which club has sold more grapefruit in the Christmas drive and more tickets to the spring Pancake Breakfast." According to Curtis, the rivalry "is as natural as it is intense" because the schools had students from the same social class and general geographic area.

=== American football team ===
From the 1960s to the 1980s, Lee High School's American football team often appeared in high school playoffs. In 1971, Lee High School were the City Champions of Houston, Texas, an incredible accomplishment for a smaller upper middle class suburban school. The Generals repeated as city champions in 1973. Many famous football players and coaches were involved in the program. Of the seven most recent inductees to the Texas High School Football Hall of Fame as of August 24, 2010, two were involved with Lee High School. Joe Clemens, a famous football coach, coached at Lee in the 1960s. Peter Gardere, a former University of Texas at Austin quarterback, played for Lee in the 1980s. The significance of American football at Lee decreased when the student demographics changed.

The opening of Westside High School, which decreased the number of students at Lee from 3,100 to 2,100, drained most of the American football players from the school and the school did not have enough children who were interested in playing American football. In 2003 the school dropped American football from its sports program; This is likely because American football is not a popular sport in the home countries of its largely Hispanic student body. Steve Amstutz, the principal, said that he did not receive complaints after the team was cut. After 2003 soccer (football) became the main sport at Lee High School. Soccer is played at Lee's homecoming games instead of football. In 2010, some alumni visiting the school expressed shock when they found out that football was not a sport at Lee. The school no longer had its historical American football trophies.

In February 2010 the school administration decided to re-establish American football as a school sport. As of May 2010 plans to re-establish American football were ongoing. The school administration assembled the football team from scratch. As of August 2010 the players originated from countries in Africa, Canada, Guatemala, Mexico, and other countries. The team had some Muslim players.

=== Golf team ===
Lee High School's home green was the Sharpstown Golf Course, a municipal golf course in Sharpstown, Greater Sharpstown, Houston located about 4 miles (6.4 km) from Lee.

The Lee High School girls' golf team existed in the 1970s. When the demographics of the school shifted, the golf team ended. Around the time that American football was cut, the school revived its boys' and girls' golf teams. As of 2003 six boys and four girls played golf for Lee; one of the ten was Caucasian. Steve Amstutz, the principal, explained that Lee founded the team to teach students how to learn to commit to a goal and to give them an activity that would keep them involved and attending school.

As of 2003 the Lee golf team had relatively little experience with the game compared to other area teams. In 2002 Lee's golf team was ranked last in a golf competition, with none of the players selected to continue forward in the competition. The players did not like to be ranked first, because the best player would compete against other district golf teams. The teams of Bellaire and Lamar high schools had more experienced players, and many of them had played with golf professionals. During that year Ryan Rhodes, the coach, said "It really is frustrating for the guys and girls to go out there and compete against somebody who's been playing a lot longer and has a lot better grasp of the game." Amstutz said that the team was not as well performing as other teams, because the team had been recently established. As of 2011 Lee no longer offers golf.

=== Swimming and Diving Team ===
Swimming and Diving was one of the school's outstanding programs in the 1980s and 1990s with swimmers and divers achieving All-American recognition and district, regional and state titles. Notable alumni include swimmers Michelle Merchant, 1979 and 1980 state champion in the 100 breast and 200 individual medley; Kirstin Torgerson, a district and regional champion and state finalist in the mid-1980s; and Nicole Dreessen, who won the state title in the 100 fly in 1989, 1990 and 1991, and the 100 back title in 1990 and 1991; and divers Heidi Gilbert - state title in 1988 and top performer for the University of Tennessee; and Tracy Bonner who also competed for the University of Tennessee and made Olympic Trials before starting to work for the Cirque du Soleil. Bonner still holds the Lady Vol records in 1m (10 dives) and 3m (11 dives). While at Tennessee, Bonner dove at the World Cup, Goodwill Games, and earned an NCAA title in the 3m. She was inducted into the Lady Vol Hall of Fame in 2006.

== Parent-teacher organization ==
When Westside HS opened in 2000, most of the infrastructure and active parents transferred their allegiance and PTO assets to the new school. As a result, since 2000, Lee does not have a parent-teacher organization.

== Alumni and alumni organizations ==
As of 2010 Lee was coordinating an alumni database with Harris Publishing and has an on campus alumni liaison group. Almost all of the inquiries that former Lee principal Steve Amstutz received from Lee alumni (2000–2009) asked for information on when school reunions would occur. Lisa Falkenberg of the Houston Chronicle said in 2010 that when she writes about Lee, she receives responses from Lee alumni. She said that some e-mails criticize illegal immigration, holding it responsible for Lee High School's decline. She received some complaints about Lee no longer using the name "Robert E. Lee."

After Falkenberg aired her 2010 column about former principal Paul Castro leaving the school after three months, she received messages from school alumni who stated that they intended to help Lee. 1965 Lee graduate Martin Bailey requested for volunteers to assist the school. Two alumni, Tom Behrman, and John Carloss, began discussing possibilities of charitable activity with the school administration, including donating to the Lee NEXT STEP Fund, a nonprofit fund that places Lee students in career and university preparatory programs; mentoring; and holding speaking events.

In April 2010 a group of alumni who intended to start an alumni organization organized a tour of the school. One alum in the tour, Joe Berwick, reported that he enjoyed meeting the students. Another, Behrman, expressed disappointment towards the deteriorated condition of the physical plant. After the Lee tour, the involved alumni proceeded to award two $5,000 scholarships to Lee students. An editorial in the Houston Chronicle praised the alumni for supporting their school. Three Lee alumni, Behrman, Melanie Hauser, and Richard Spence, founded the Robert E. Lee High School Alumni Association to reconnect alumni with their alma mater and provide additional, ongoing assistance for Lee High School and to help it improve its community relations. The Robert E. Lee Alumni Association hosted a 50th Birthday, "Gray & Gold JubiLEE" All School Reunion in October 2012, where alumni from all 50 graduating classes convened to celebrate and recognize 50 years of Generals history.

== Neighborhoods served ==
The school district zones a large area of west/southwest Houston outside of the 610 Loop to Lee.

A significant number of Lee's students now come from the Gulfton community, a group of apartment complexes housing recent immigrants. Other areas zoned to Lee include Uptown Houston, St. George Place (Lamar Terrace), Larchmont, Briargrove, Shenandoah, Tanglewood, Tanglewilde, Briar Meadow, Briarcroft, Woodlake, West Oaks, Jeanetta, the Houston ISD portions of Piney Point Village and Hunters Creek Village, Sharpstown Country Club Estates, and small portions of Westchase east of Gessner Road.

Four Leaf Towers, a condominium complex, is zoned to Wisdom.

Lee High School served all areas within the Westside attendance boundary until its 2000 opening, including Walnut Bend, Briargrove Park, and Rivercrest. The pre-2000 Lee attendance zone bordered City of Bellaire, the communities of Alief and Spring Branch, and Greater Katy.

Even though several wealthy neighborhoods such as Tanglewood and Briargrove are primarily zoned to Wisdom, parents in those areas prefer to send their children to Lamar, Westside, private high schools, or charter high schools.

== Feeder patterns ==
Elementary schools that feed into Wisdom include:

- Briargrove
- Benavidez
- Piney Point
- Rodriguez

(portions)

- Braeburn
- Condit
- Cunningham
- Emerson
- St. George Place
- Sutton

Middle schools that feed into Wisdom include:

- Tanglewood (formerly Grady)

Partial:

- Jane Long
- Pershing
- Revere

All pupils zoned to Pilgrim K-8 are zoned to Wisdom.

All pupils zoned to Long and Pershing Middle Schools may attend Pin Oak Middle School. Accordingly, Pin Oak also feeds into Lee High School.

Students of the Briargrove, Emerson, Pilgrim, and Piney Point elementary attendance zones may also attend Briarmeadow Charter School, so that school feeds into Wisdom.

== Notable alumni ==
- David Donoho (mathematician, statistician)
- Andy Fickman (film and stage director and screenwriter) - 1982
- Jeff Filgo (television producer and screenwriter) - 1985
- Peter Gardere (American football player and member of the Texas High School Football Hall of Fame) - 1988
- Billy Gibbons (member of ZZ Top) - 1968
- Mike Quinn (American football player)
- Robert K. Ritner (professor of Egyptology at Oriental Institute of the University of Chicago) - 1971
- Dallas Roberts (actor)
- Khodr Zaarour (professor and news correspondent)

== Notable faculty ==
- Gil Bartosh (football coach, former Texas El Paso head coach, and member, Texas High School Football Hall of Fame)

== See also ==
- Houston Independent School District
- Hispanics in Houston
