= The Houstonian Hotel =

Luxury hotel in Houston, Texas

Coordinates: 29.7681°N 95.4587°W

The Houstonian Hotel, Club & Spa is a luxury hotel located in Houston, Texas. The 18-acre campus includes a hotel and conference center, several restaurants, spa and health and fitness center.

== History ==
The developer of the Houstonian Hotel was Tom Fatjo, a Houstonian who had also founded Browning-Ferris Industries (BFI). The hotel opened in 1980. George Alexander of the Houston Press said that the hotel was "built as a health club for business executives trying to shed pounds and rediscover their inner velociraptor".

=== George H. W. Bush residence ===
George H. W. Bush used the hotel as his official voting residence in the 1980s. After, signing an affidavit in April 1985, promising to build his retirement house in Houston, Vice President of the United States George H. W. Bush was permitted to use Texas as his official voting residence. Bush's official voting address was Suite 271, a three bedroom suite in The Houstonian. Bush's wife, Barbara, also used The Houstonian as her official voting address. The Bushes had moved out of Houston in 1981. Alexander said that, therefore The Houstonian became better known for being the designated residence of Bush than for its original purpose.

Bush spent most of his time away from Washington, DC in Kennebunkport, Maine. By making Texas the family official residence, Bush did not have to pay Maine income taxes. The Maine People's Alliance, a group advocating for fairness in taxation, said that by declaring Texas as his residence, he did not pay about $244,000 (equivalent to $664,000 in 2025 dollars) in income taxes. Money had reported that Bush was paying less than 1% of his gross income in taxes while most Americans paid around 10%.

=== Chapter 11 bankruptcy and post-bankruptcy ===
In February 1992 Houstonian Properties Ltd., the owner of the hotel, filed for Chapter 11 bankruptcy protection. Two Houston-based hotel companies, Redstone Management and Wedge Hotels Corp., placed bids to buy The Houstonian. In December 1992 Redstone Hotel Inc. had completed its purchase of The Houstonian. Redstone paid $33.5 million (equivalent to $76.9 million in 2025).

In 2003 the company Wayport Inc. of Austin, Texas installed new wired internet and high speed wireless internet services at the Houstonian. The firm scheduled completion for the end of February of that year.

As of 2001 George H. W. Bush frequently patronized the hotel astroturf jogging trail and bar. As of 2004 George H. W. Bush was a member of the hotel's health club. He received his haircuts at the hotel spa.

In 2008 the hotel completed a refurbishing of the guest rooms which added energy efficient features. The hotel spent $7.1 million (equivalent to $10.6 million in 2025) in the refurbishing campaign, which was overseen by Kirksey architecture. The planning for the makeover took 18 months, and the makeover itself took four months to complete. Katherine Feser of the Houston Chronicle said that it resulted in "Warm hues, rich fabrics and wood furniture set a residential tone".

In 2010 TripAdvisor.com ranked the hotel #9 on its list of top 25 hotels in the United States. The Houstonian was one of two Texas hotels on the list.

== Campus ==
=== Location ===
The facility is located on a 18-acre (7.3 ha) plot of land located on North Post Oak Boulevard, in proximity to Woodway and along the 610 Loop West Loop.

Tim McDonald of Travel Golf, a website of the Golf Channel, said that the location, being in proximity to Uptown and Downtown meant that the hotel became a popular place for small and large meetings. McDonald added that many celebrities and "most of Houston's elite" have visited the hotel because it is "hidden away in one of the more exclusive areas of the city." Mark Lupton, the director of sales, said "It's like a Who's Who of Houston"

=== Hotel facilities ===
Tim McDonald of Travel Golf, of the Golf Channel, said "The Houstonian Hotel looks like something a big-spending, Texas oil baron might have built in the old days". The property includes a 294-room hotel, a spa named Trellis, a restaurant, a 125,000-square-foot (11,600 m^{2}) private health and fitness center club, and a conference center. The hotel property features a lobby that has a hand-carved stone fireplace that is 30 feet (9.1 m) tall. The hotel had 32,000-square-foot (3,000 m^{2}) of meeting space. In 2004 the hotel had 288 guest rooms; McDonald said that most hotels of a similar size had about half of the meeting space.

McDonald said "You might think the lack of a golf course on the premises would detract from its allure for meeting planners, but its nationally known health club makes up the difference."

As of 2001 the restaurant, which featured fine dining, had the name Olivette. As of 2004 the restaurant had the name Manor House.

The Houstonian also featured a bar, named "The Bar."

==== Aquatics center ====
In 2005 the hotel opened an aquatics center, built for $3 million. Watts Pool Company provided construction services and Camden served as the general contractor. The center includes a competition sports pool, a resort pool, a garden pool, an outdoor shower, and four new toilet facilities. The competition sports pool is 25 yards (23 m) by 25 metres (82 ft) and is 6 feet (1.8 m) deep. It includes digital clocks, removable starting blocks, and a deck-level waterline that prevents the formation of waves. The resort pool has a sunning shelf, a "little lagoon" baby pool, various interactive waterfalls, and a 32-foot (9.8 m) slide built into a rock-scape. The garden pool includes a lap swim lane, has warmer water, and has Texas-style landscaping.

== Meeting services ==
The hotel is designed to accommodate meetings, which as of 2004 generate half of the hotel's business. Mark Lupton, the director of sales, said in 2004 that "The Houstonian is a little different than normal places. We're kind of like halfway between a luxury hotel and a full-fledged conference center."

As of 2004 the hotel's day meeting packages are $89 (about $151.7 in today's money) per day per person. This rate includes meals, meeting spaces, and other amenities. The hotel includes genuine windows in meeting rooms, padded conference chairs, and other small luxury details. Hotel officials stated that the small details differentiate the hotel as a meeting space from other hotels. Lupton said "I can tell you that makes all the difference in the world. You can look outside and see all the greenery, versus staring at the wallpaper or the freeway. We call it an urban resort in its own little oasis. You pull out of here and a quarter mile, you're back among all the tall buildings."
