= Bissonnet Street =

Street in Houston, Texas, U.S.

- Length: 19 mi (31 km)
- West end: Westmoor Drive, Fort Bend County
- Major junctions: Beltway 8 Interstate 69 (Southwest Freeway); Interstate 610 (West Loop South)
- East end: Main Street in the Houston Museum District

Construction
- Inauguration: 1915

Bissonnet Street is a major arterial road in Houston, Texas, United States. Bissonnet begins at Main Street in the Museum District of Houston and travels 19.4 miles (31.2 km) west-southwest through West University Place, Bellaire, Gulfton, Sharpstown, and Alief before terminating in unincorporated Fort Bend County near Mission Bend. Within the Interstate 610 loop, Bissonnet serves or passes a number of historic Houston neighborhoods, including Boulevard Oaks, Southampton and Shadyside. The Houston Press named Bissonnet the "Best Route into the City" in its 2007 awards, noting the road's route through "economically and ethnically diverse neighborhoods."

Like many other Houston streets established during the early 20th century, Bissonnet is named for a local World War I serviceman who was killed while in the military, George Herman Bissonnet. Prior to 1915, portions of Bissonnet were known as County Poor Farm Road due to their connectivity to the Harris County Poor Farm, a public housing facility which operated between 1894 and 1935.

A 1.6-acre (6,500 m^{2}) site at the intersection of Bissonnet Street and Ashby Street in Southampton has been the focus of considerable controversy since the mid-2000s, when a 21-story apartment tower was first proposed for the lot. The "Ashby highrise" development generated strong backlash from area homeowners, who consider the building incompatible with their predominantly single-family neighborhood. The site has been the subject of multiple lawsuits and has spurred a wider discussion about Houston's lack of zoning laws.

In 2013, the Houston Police Department staged an operation, the "Bissonnet Initiative", which resulted in the arrest of more than 100 people involved in a prostitution ring on both Bissonnet and Beechnut near Beltway 8. The prostitution is rampant at the “Bissonnet “blade,” also known as the Bissonnet “track” and has included the sexual exploitation of minors.

== See also ==
- Red-light district
