= 2727 Kirby =

Residential tower in Houston, Texas

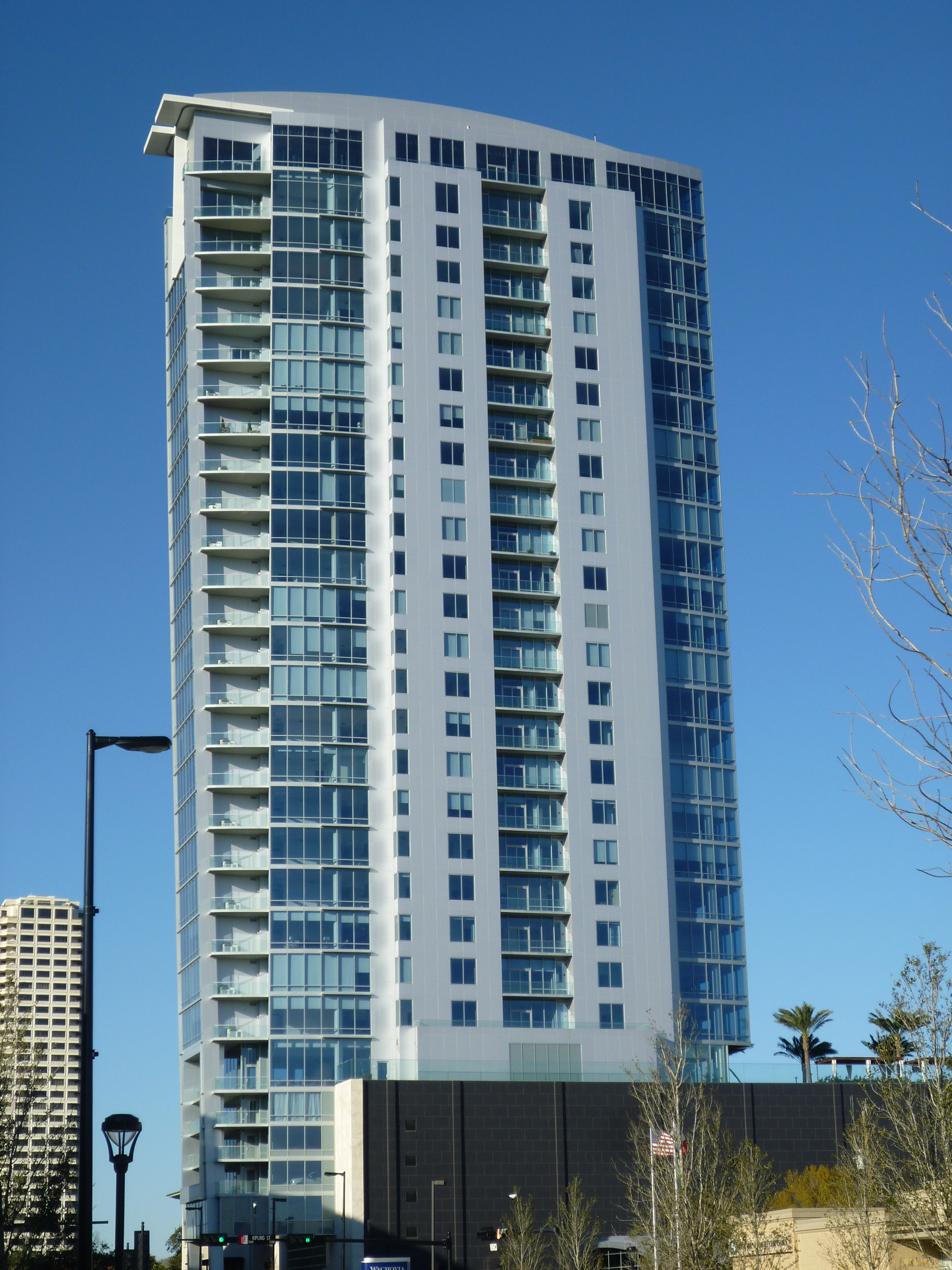

General information
- Status: Completed
- Type: Residential
- Location: 2727 Kirby Drive, Houston, Texas
- Coordinates: 29.7410°N 95.4181°W
- Construction started: 2006
- Opening: 2009
- Cost: $120 million
- Owner: Kirby Tower LP

Height
- Roof: 123.4 meters (405 ft)

Technical details
- Floor count: 30

Design and construction
- Architect: Ziegler Cooper Architects
- Developer: Michael Atlas

2727 Kirby is a 30-story, 78 unit, condominium high rise, designed by Ziegler Cooper and located in Upper Kirby just south of Westheimer in Houston, Texas.

== Zoned schools ==
Residents of this building are zoned to schools in the Houston Independent School District. They are zoned to Poe Elementary School, Lanier Middle School, and Lamar High School.

== Defective construction lawsuit ==
Kirby Tower LP filed a lawsuit against the developer citing defective construction repair costs. Problems included a glass falling out of place and landing on a vehicle below as well as defective glass railing on individual balconies, and problems with heating and air, fire sprinklers, plumbing, electrical systems and waterproofing.

As of 2014 all problems have been rectified.

== See also ==
- List of tallest buildings in Houston
- List of tallest buildings in Texas
