= Bob Lanier (disambiguation) =

Bob Lanier (1948–2022) was an American basketball player and coach.

Bob Lanier may also refer to:

- Bob Lanier (politician) (1925–2014), American politician and businessman, former mayor of Houston
- Bob Lanier Middle School, Houston, Texas

== See also ==
- Rob Lanier (born 1968), American basketball coach
