= Boulevard Historic District =

Boulevard Historic District may refer to:

- Boulevard Historic District (Athens, Georgia), listed on the NRHP in Georgia
- Boulevard Subdivision Historic District, Greenwood, MS, listed on the NRHP in Mississippi
- Boulevards Historic District, Lincoln, NE, listed on the NRHP in Nebraska
- Boulevard Oaks Historic District, Houston, TX, listed on the NRHP in Texas
- Boulevard Historic District (Richmond, Virginia), listed on the NRHP in Virginia
