= Bob Lanier Middle School =

Public school in Houston, Texas

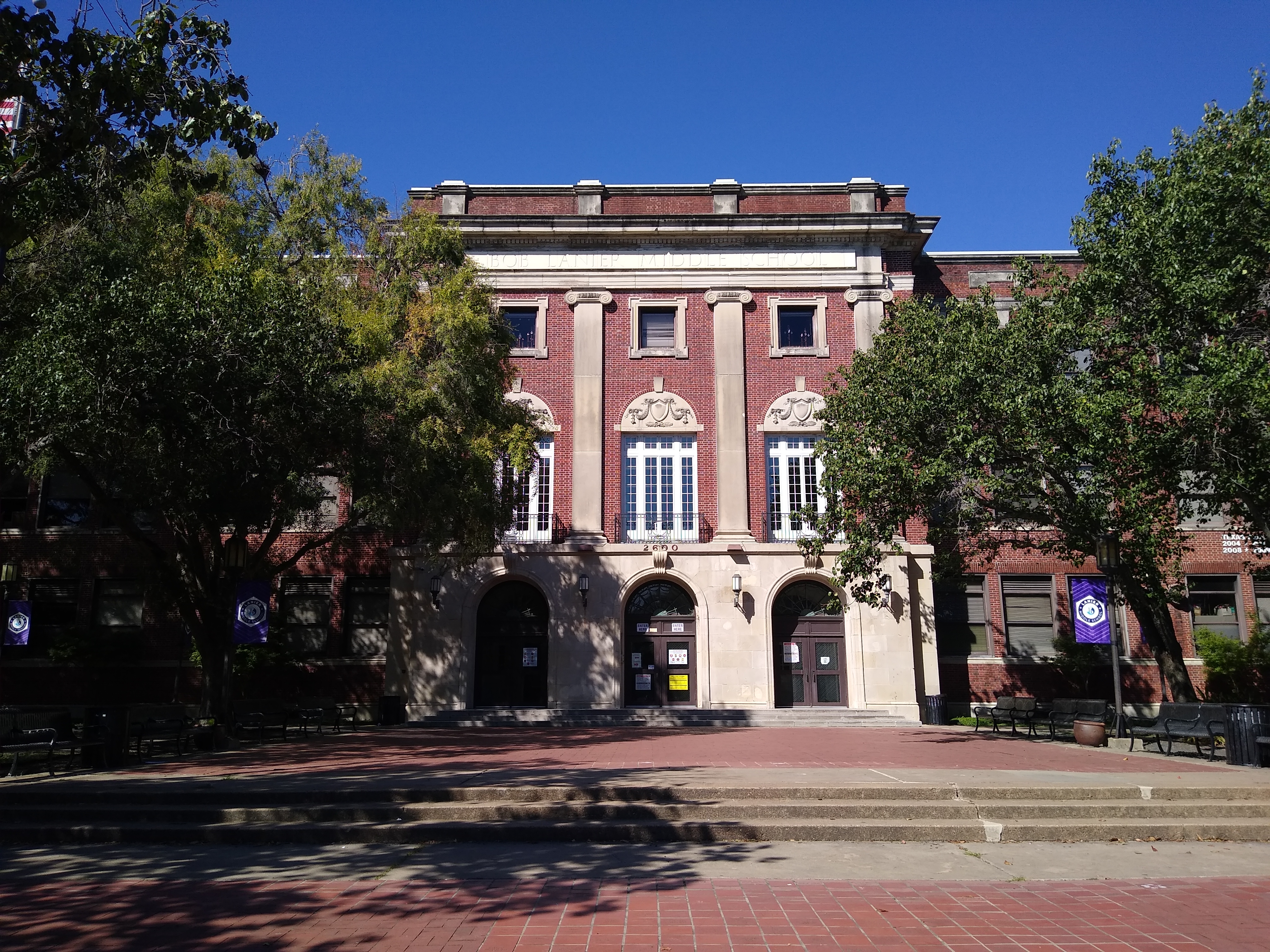

Location
- Houston, Texas, United States; 29.741875°N 95.405517°W

Information
- Type: Public School (US)
- Motto: Achievement with Honor
- Established: 1926
- School district: HISD – Central Region
- Principal: Marcus Williams
- Grades: 6-8
- Age range: 11-14
- Enrollment: 1,464 (2018/2019)
- Colors: Purple, Red and White
- Mascot: Purple Pups
- Teams: The Purple Pup
- Newspaper: The Purple Page
- Communities served: Montrose, Afton Oaks, Boulevard Oaks, River Oaks, Southampton
- Feeder schools: Baker Montessori School (K-8); Poe Elementary School; River Oaks Elementary School; Others listed below
- TEA Rating: Recognized (2007/2008)
- Magnet: Partial: Vanguard/IBMYP
- PTO: https://www.lanierpto.org/
- Website: Lanier Middle School

Bob Lanier Middle School, formerly Sidney Lanier Junior High School/Middle School, is a middle school (lower secondary school) in Houston, Texas, United States, with a ZIP code of 77098. Lanier, a school of the Houston Independent School District (HISD), handles grades 6 through 8. Named after former mayor of Houston Bob Lanier, the school is located in Neartown and near Montrose and has both neighborhood non-magnet and Vanguard/IBMYP (of the International Baccalaureate) gifted/talented programs. Lanier's neighborhood program serves Montrose, Afton Oaks, Boulevard Oaks, River Oaks, Southampton, and other communities.

== History ==
The school was originally going to be designated Abraham Lincoln School, but after criticism from veterans of the U.S. Civil War who fought for the Confederate States of America, the name was changed before opening to Sidney Lanier, a Confederate soldier who later became recognized as the "Poet of the Confederacy". As of 2014, there were at least ten high schools named after Lanier. Lanier opened in 1926 as one of HISD's first junior high schools. In 1926, the Purple Pup was adopted as Lanier's mascot.

In 1935, students from Lanier created a petition to rename Woodhead Street, named after John Woodhead, to Higginbotham Street, after the principal, Blanch Higginbotham. According to the article "Historic Houston Streets: The Stories Behind the Name," students at other schools used "Wood head" as a derogatory label for Lanier students, implying that they lacked intelligence. After hearing testimony about Woodhead's character, the Houston City Council decided to keep the previous street name. The students apologized to E. S. Woodhead, John Woodhead's brother and a Houstonian. Lanier was previously reserved for white children but it desegregated by 1970.

In 1973, Lanier's Vanguard program was instated. Lanier received a re-dedication after renovations in 1982.

In September 1991 Lanier was one of 32 HISD schools that had capped enrollments; in other words, the school was filled and excess students had to attend other schools.

Lanier's first floor flooded in 1998 due to Tropical Storm Frances. In the early 2000s (decade), to reduce echo in the classrooms and to allow easier installation of network hardware, a false ceiling was installed in almost all classrooms and hallways. Sometime after 2001, televisions that were in every classroom were removed.

Before the 2008/2009 school year, Lanier had a third temporary building that housed bathrooms and water fountains, though only one water fountain out of three was operational as of 2005. At the start of this school year, the building housing the bathrooms was removed, and the other two temporary buildings were moved from the field to other parts of the campus.

Lanier was renovated during the 2008/2009 school year, with a new paint job, new interior signage, and new walkways to the new locations of the temporary buildings.

Dr. Katie Bradarich became principal in July 2017. She was abruptly reassigned on November 28, 2018, according to a voice message received by the parents of the students.

=== 2016 Renaming ===
On February 12, 2016, the HISD board voted to require Lanier to change its name again to purge HISD of school names based on Confederate figures, even though Lanier's students approved of keeping the school's name. Former teacher Jim Henley stated that Lanier was known as a creative artist and that he was not known as a Confederate soldier. Mike Tolson of the Houston Chronicle wrote that since Lanier had only a small number of works, he "is not studied much these days[...]and students who are not from his native Georgia are unlikely even to know his name." Tolson argued that "For the majority-minority board, [Lanier] was low-hanging fruit, along with other men who actually served the Confederate cause in a more serious way and are not studied in classes on American poetry."

In May 2016 the HISD board voted to rename the school after Bob Lanier, former mayor of Houston. "Lanier Watchdogs", a group of Lanier parents, accused the HISD board of omitting the cost of renaming the school; this group hired Wayne Dolcefino to assist in their investigation.

In April 2016 a group of parents asked HISD board member Jolanda Jones to apologize to students who opposed the name change after she accused them of bullying other students in favor of the name change during a board meeting. Dolcefino investigated the issue and found no evidence of bullying. Jones refused to apologize despite the apparent discredit of her claims.

In May 2016 a group of residents threatened to sue HISD if it followed through with renaming Lanier. In June 2016 a group of eight Houston area residents, including alumni and parents, had given HISD a second request; when HISD did not accept it, they sued HISD to get an injunction to prevent the name changes. Dolcefino serves as their spokesperson.

Columnist John Nova Lomax argued against the renaming in Texas Monthly because Bob Lanier had a mixed political legacy.

== Admissions and neighborhoods served ==
Students zoned to Lanier automatically are eligible to attend the school, and are automatically able to attend the Vanguard program if they qualify. Several areas of Houston inside the 610 Loop are zoned to Lanier, including Afton Oaks, River Oaks, Boulevard Oaks, Avalon Place, Southampton Place (including Broadacres,), Shadyside, portions of the Neartown area west of Montrose Boulevard (including portions of Montrose west of Montrose Boulevard, Castle Court, Cherryhurst and Cherryhurst Addition, Lancaster Place, Mandell Place, Park, Richwood, Vermont Commons, and WAMM, as well as much of Hyde Park, and portions of North Montrose), Weslayan Plaza, Oak Estates, Royden Oaks, Ranch Estates, Highland Village, Lynn Park, West Lane Place, Rice Village, and most of Upper Kirby (areas of the district located west of Edloe and north of Westpark, residential areas located east of Edloe, west of Kirby, north of U.S. Route 59, and areas located east of Kirby).

Notable apartment and condominium complexes zoned to Lanier include 2727 Kirby, The Driscoll at River Oaks, The Huntingdon, and Residences at La Colombe d'Or.

For non-zoned students to attend Lanier, parents must submit Vanguard magnet application forms. Admissions from this point on are drawn randomly on a lottery-basis. 256 students are drawn each year. Students beyond this are put on a wait-list.

== Academics ==
In the 1995–1996 school year, 82% of black students and 70% of Hispanic students at Lanier passed state tests. 98% of White students had passed the same tests. Tom Monaghan, the principal, said "If you looked at the big picture, we looked pretty good. But we said, 'That's not good enough. We have to look at the zoned kids.'"

The school added an extra teacher for mathematics remediation for 8th graders, established new instructional strategies for language arts, added additional mathematics instruction for 7th graders in need of help in mathematics content, and created after-school reading and writing groups for Latino students. In the 2000–2001 school year, after the measures were taken, 89% of black students and 86% of Hispanic students passed state tests.

As of 2011 Lanier had received Texas Gold Performance Awards based on performance in language arts, mathematics, reading, science, social studies, and writing.

Languages: Spanish, French, Mandarin Chinese.

== Location and campus ==
The campus consists of a three-story main building, a separate building (containing a band and a drama room), and 2 temporary buildings (for the health room). Lanier has an indoor pool located in the basement of the main building. Lanier also has an auditorium with a wraparound balcony located in the center of the campus between the South and North Patios, the latter officially named the "Tom Hutch-Hutchings Memorial Gardens" in honor of a longtime Lanier World Cultural Studies teacher. There is also a Chess Patio where one can play chess located next to the cafeteria. Lunch may be eaten on the South (also known as Purple) or Chess Patio, in addition to the cafeteria.

In the main building, the first and second floors have 6th and 7th grade classes. The third floor has 8th grade, core classes, and electives.

Lanier's campus has been expanded numerous times since it was first built. The most notable expansion was the addition of the area of the building housing the cafeteria and gymnasium. This expansion has resulted in some quirks in the building that are still visible today, most notably a door leading to stairs to the basement that is only half-exposed above the floor of the hallway. These stairs are no longer in service, though the door can be opened even though it's blocked by the hallway floor. Students aren't allowed to open the door and/or go down those stairs. Prior to this expansion, the cafeteria was located where the library is today, on the third floor. A dumbwaiter, located where the elevator is today, carried food to the cafeteria.(:

The windows at Lanier were upgraded at some point. Originally, they were 4-panel window panes that could each be opened. They were upgraded to standard slide-open windows. Possibly at this point, for currently unknown reasons, many of the windowsills in the back side of the school were bricked up.

"The Pipe of Peace", a mural by the artist Grace Spaulding John, was originally located in the front of the school before being painted over. It was repainted in the summer of 2015, in its original place, in the front of the school. In addition to "The Pipe of Peace" there was a mural of the story of King Arthur on the third floor, and a mural of half black and white painting of the school from 1926 and the a color version of the school in the early 1990s to 2000s. Both of the latter Murals have been painted over.

Lanier is located in Winlow Place blocks 2 and 5, in the Neartown community. Lanier is nearby single-family houses and small shops. A convenience store, a hardware store, and a few restaurants are near Lanier Middle School.

The Upper Kirby district, which is near Lanier, plans to establish a "teen center" at Richmond at Wake Forest geared toward students at Lanier, St. John's, Lamar, and other Upper Kirby schools and schools near Upper Kirby. Funding issues have delayed establishment of the center.

== School uniform ==
All Lanier students are required to wear school uniforms consisting of monogrammed LMS polo shirts in colors of red, black, or white monday thru thursday, and late in the 2013 school year (around May) purple shirts were brought back. They had not been available for about 10 years. The polo shirts purchased at the school and pairs of khaki bottoms (trousers, shorts, capris, or skirts). GSG leaders wear maroon and green shirts. This uniform was instituted at the start of the 1997/1998 school year. The school also provides used uniforms for students who may not be able to afford them.

The Texas Education Agency specifies that the parents and/or guardians of students zoned to a school with uniforms may apply for a waiver to opt out of the uniform policy so their children do not have to wear the uniform; parents must specify "bona fide" reasons, such as religious reasons or philosophical objections.

== Student discipline ==
The school enacted attendance policies meant to maintain a high level of student attendance, and the school threatens to criminally prosecute parents of students consistently committing truancy. The school had received awards for having high student attendance rates.

== Student body ==
During the 2016/2017 school year, Lanier had 1,469 students.

24% qualified for free or reduced lunch.

== Feeder patterns ==
=== Zoned schools ===
Elementary schools that feed into Lanier include

- Baker Montessori (formerly Wilson, partial)
- River Oaks
- Poe (partial)
- Roberts (partial)
- St. George Place (partial)

All students who are zoned to Lanier are zoned to Lamar High School.

=== IB program ===
The IB programs at Poe, River Oaks, Roberts, and West University elementaries feed into Lanier's IB program. Lanier accordingly feeds its IB students into Lamar High School's IB program.

== Notable people ==
Staff

- Van G. Garrett (poet)

Alumni

- Muthu Alagappan (Pioneer of basketball analytics)
- Larry Blyden (Actor)
- Denton Cooley (Surgeon)
- Walter Cronkite (Journalist)
- George Ducas (Singer)
- Linda Ellerbee (Journalist)
- Bianna Golodryga (ABC News Correspondent)
- Chachi Gonzales (Hip-Hop Dancer)
- Fred Hofheinz (Mayor of Houston)
- Carli Mosier (Anime voice actress)
- Emeka Okafor (Basketball player)
- Lisa Papademetriou (Children's Author)
- Tommy Sands (Singer)
- Mark White (Governor of Texas)

== Notes ==
Preceded by River Oaks, Poe, Roberts, St. George Place, and Wilson	Houston Independent School District; Grades 6-8	Succeeded by Lamar High School
