= The Huntingdon =

Residential high-rise building in Houston Texas

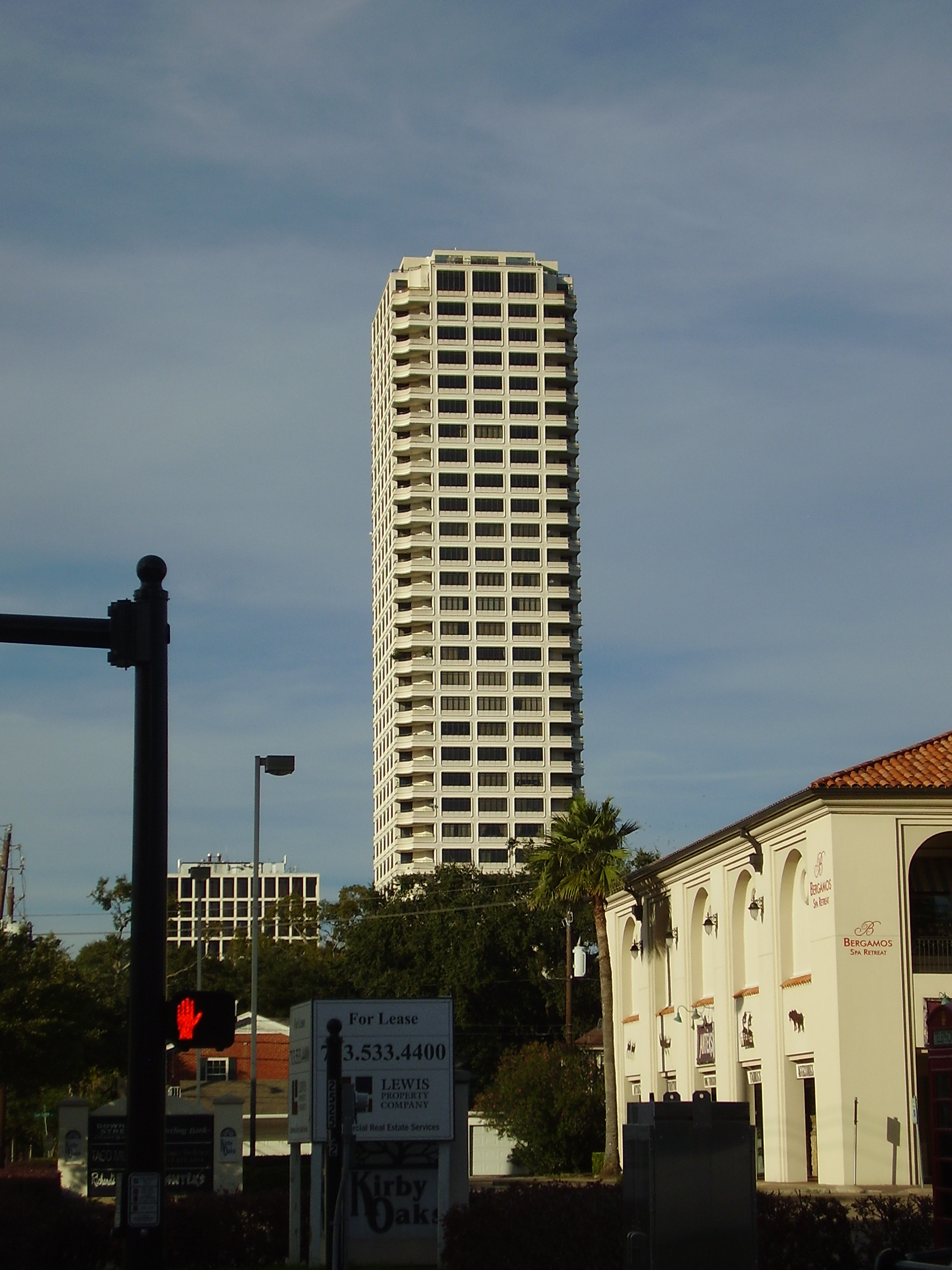
- The Huntingdon
- Interactive map of the The Huntingdon area

General information
- Status: Completed
- Type: Residential
- Location: 2121 Kirby Drive, Houston, Texas
- Coordinates: 29.7469°N 95.4180°W
- Completed: 1984

Height
- Roof: 503 ft (153 m)

Technical details
- Floor count: 34

Design and construction
- Architect: Talbott Wilson

The Huntingdon is a 503 feet (153 m) tall skyscraper in Houston, Texas. The 34-floor structure was completed in 1984 by the developer James E. Lyon. It is the 27th tallest building in the city. It is also the tallest entirely residential building in Houston and was the tallest residential building in Texas until the Mercantile Building was converted into residences. The Mercantile, with baroque gate piers, is twenty feet taller than The Huntingdon.

== Zoned schools ==
The Huntington is within the Houston Independent School District.

Residents are zoned to River Oaks Elementary School, Lanier Middle School, and Lamar High School.

== Notable residents ==
- Ken Lay
- William J. Hill
- Joanne King Herring

== See also ==
- List of tallest buildings in Houston
