= Upper Kirby =

Coordinates: 29.736°N 95.419°W

- Neighborhood of Houston
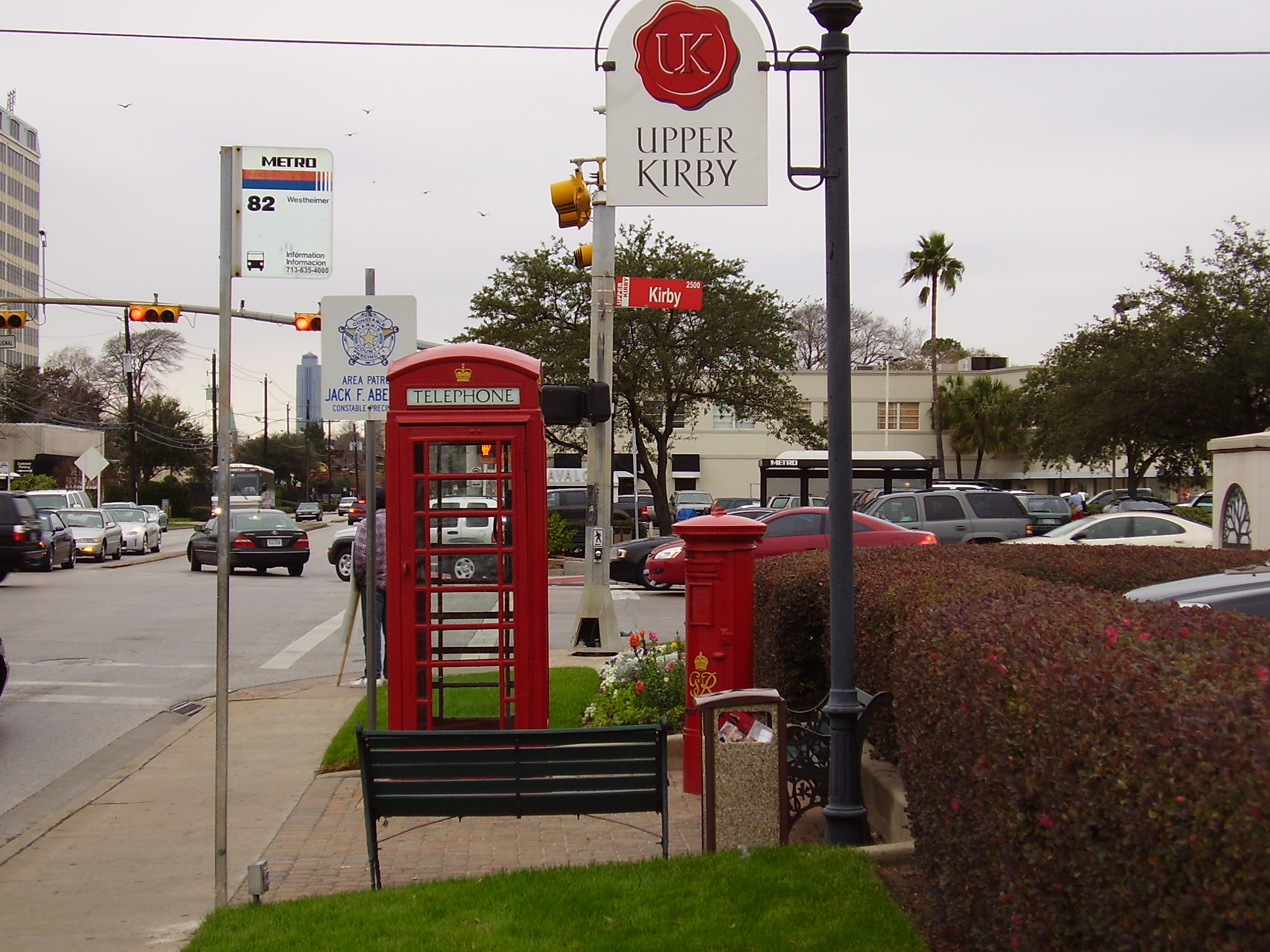
- Upper Kirby (Looking West from NE corner of intersection of Westheimer Rd. and Kirby Drive)
- Interactive map of Upper Kirby
- Country: United States
- State: Texas
- County: Harris County
- City: Houston

Population (2009)
  - Total: 17,369
  - Density: 4,841/sq mi (1,869/km^{2})
- Time zone: UTC-6 (CST)
  - Summer (DST): UTC-5 (CDT)
- ZIP codes: 77005, 77027, 77048, 77098
- Area codes: 713, 281, 832
- Website: Upper Kirby District Website

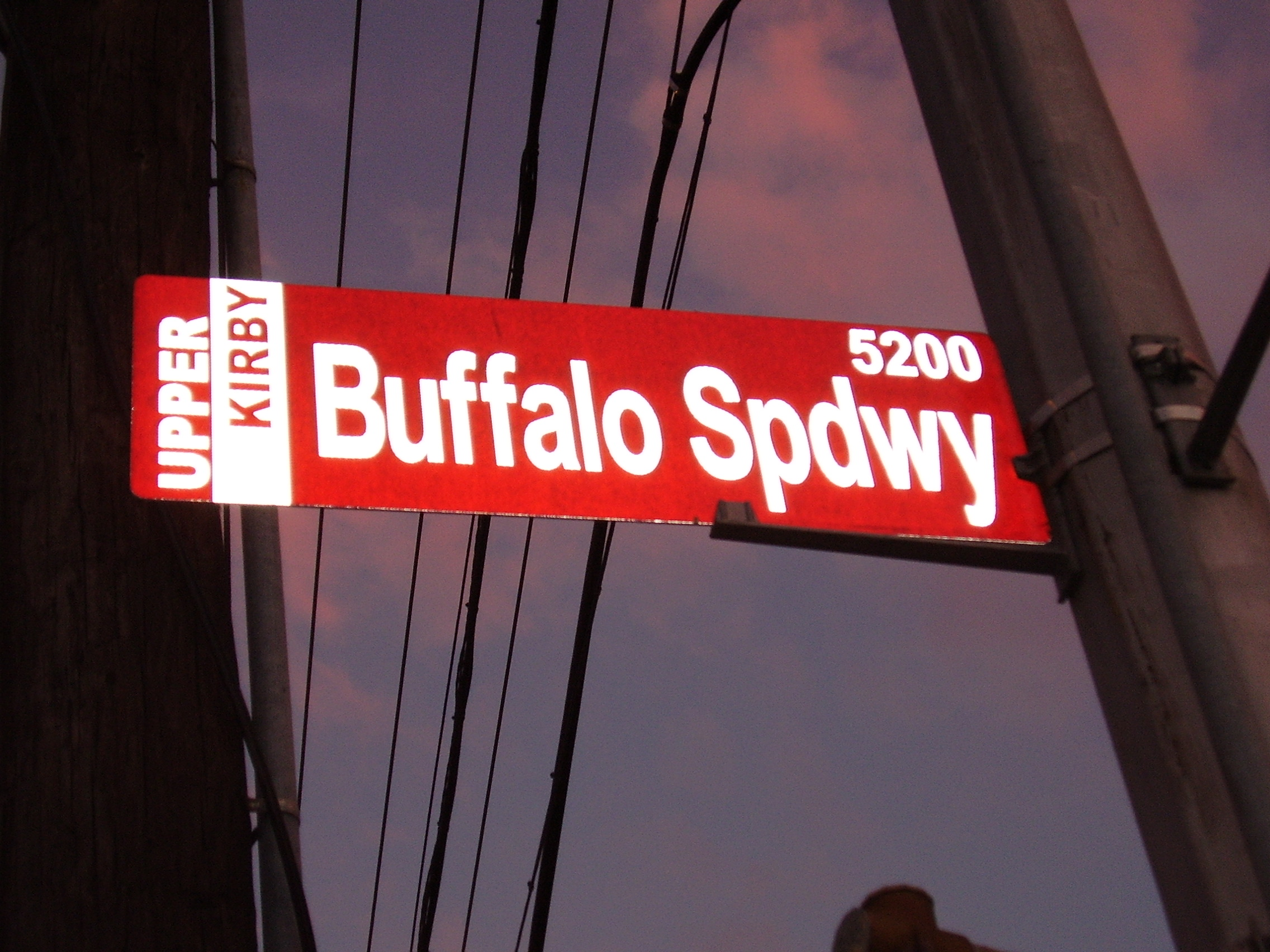
An Upper Kirby street sign (in the classic red that distinguishes the Upper Kirby district from its surrounding areas) showing Buffalo Speedway

Upper Kirby is a commercial district in Houston, Texas, United States. It is named after Kirby Drive, so indirectly takes its name from John Henry Kirby.

Upper Kirby contains many businesses, including restaurants. Upper Kirby is east of the Greenway Plaza, southwest of Neartown, north of the city of West University Place, and south of River Oaks.

Upper Kirby is considered to be in an area west of South Shepherd Drive, east of Buffalo Speedway, north of Bissonnet Street, and south of Westheimer Road.

== History ==
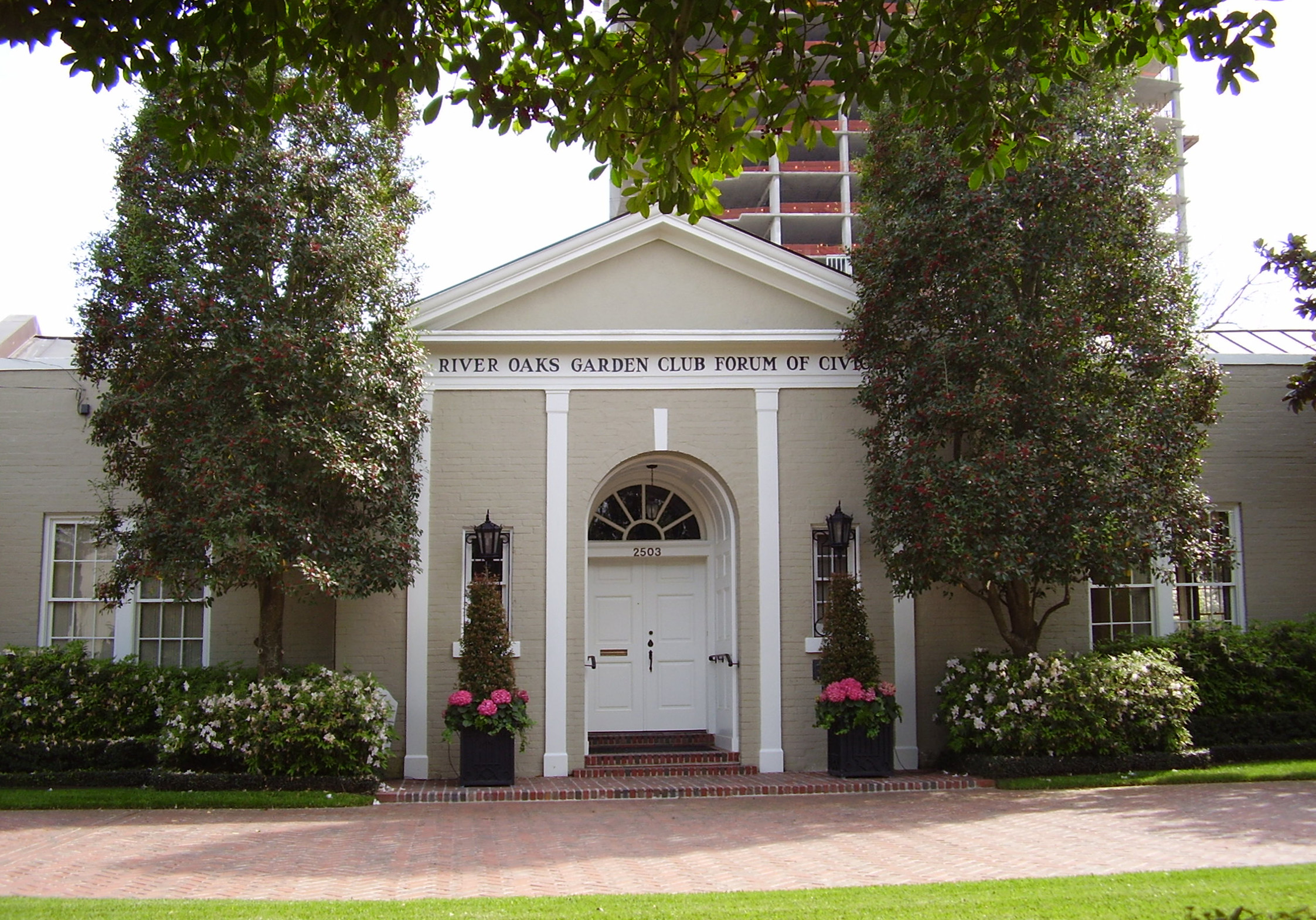
River Oaks Garden Club Forum of Civics

The River Oaks Garden Club Forum of Civics, located in Upper Kirby, is listed in the National Register of Historic Places as the "Forum of Civics" on October 13, 1988. Formerly a county schoolhouse, the building is currently the administrative center for the River Oaks Garden Club.

The Texas Legislature created the Harris County Improvement District #3, also known as the Upper Kirby Management District, which governs the Upper Kirby area. In 1999 the Houston city council created the Tax Increment Reinvestment Zone 19, which covers 15 acres (61,000 m^{2}). Prior to the formation of these districts, the area did not have a distinct identity. The usage of the British decor and the name were calculated to give the area a specific identity. At one time the red phone booths were operational, and there was a double decker bus that shuttled patrons to various restaurants.

In 2006 the Upper Kirby district had plans to establish a "teen center" at Richmond at Wake Forest geared towards students at Lamar High School, Lanier Middle School, St. John's School, and other Upper Kirby schools and schools near Upper Kirby. Funding issues have delayed establishment of the center.

== Cityscape ==
In 2017, about 53% of the housing units were constructed post-1999.

== Economy ==
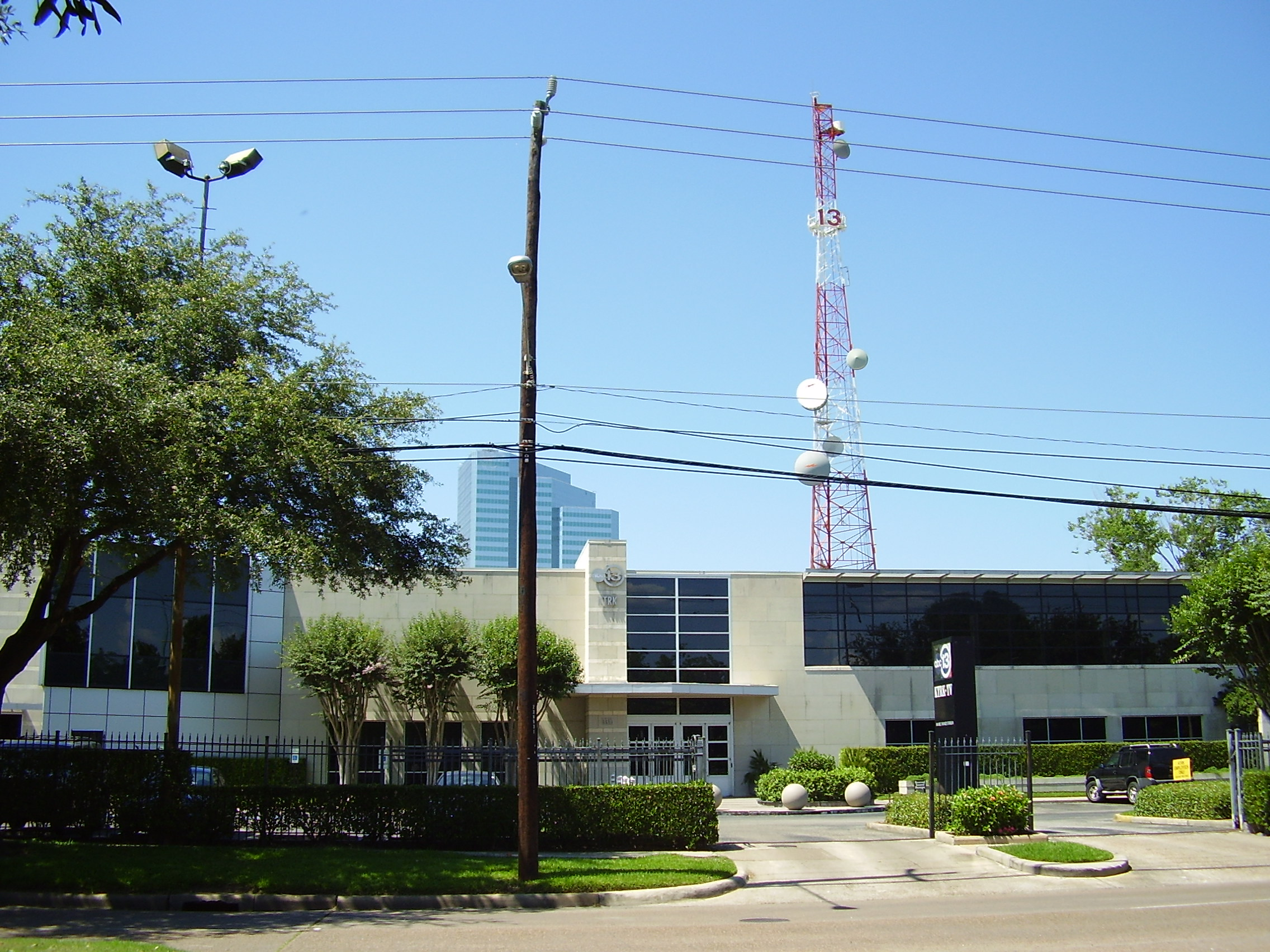
The KTRK-TV studios

Several businesses are located in the district. The studio for KTRK-TV ABC 13, the ABC station for the Houston area, is located at 3310 Bissonnet Street. Solvay America has its headquarters in the district. cPanel has its office in Upper Kirby. Restaurants Acquisition I, L.L.C., the operator of Black-eyed Pea restaurants in Texas, is headquartered in Upper Kirby.

In addition a Pakistan International Airlines booking office is in Suite 805 at 3730 Kirby Drive. CBS Radio Houston which houses KHMX, KILT-AM, KILT-FM, KLOL, KKHH, KIKK, is also located in Upper Kirby.

== Government ==
=== Local government ===
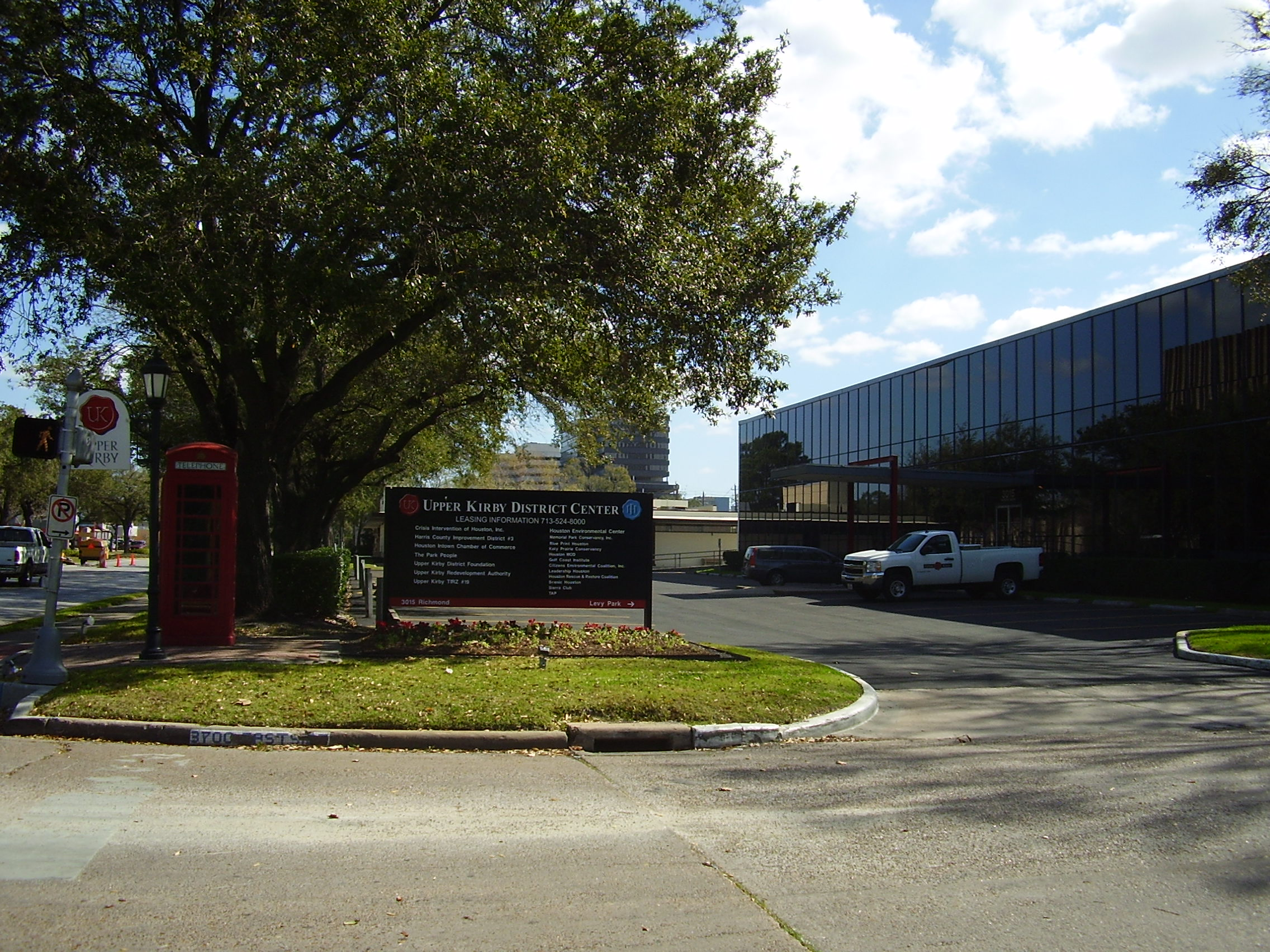
Upper Kirby District Center

The Upper Kirby Management District is headquartered in Suite 250 in the Upper Kirby District Center at 3015 Richmond Avenue.

Upper Kirby is a part of the Houston City Council District C. Upper Kirby also makes up a large portion of Harris County Precinct 139, which is the smallest political subdivision in Texas. The current Precinct Chair of Upper Kirby/River Oaks is Louis Molnar (D), and Mr. Molnar also serves as the Presiding Judge of Precinct 139.

The community is within the Houston Police Department's Central Patrol Division, headquartered at 61 Riesner.

=== County, state and federal representation ===
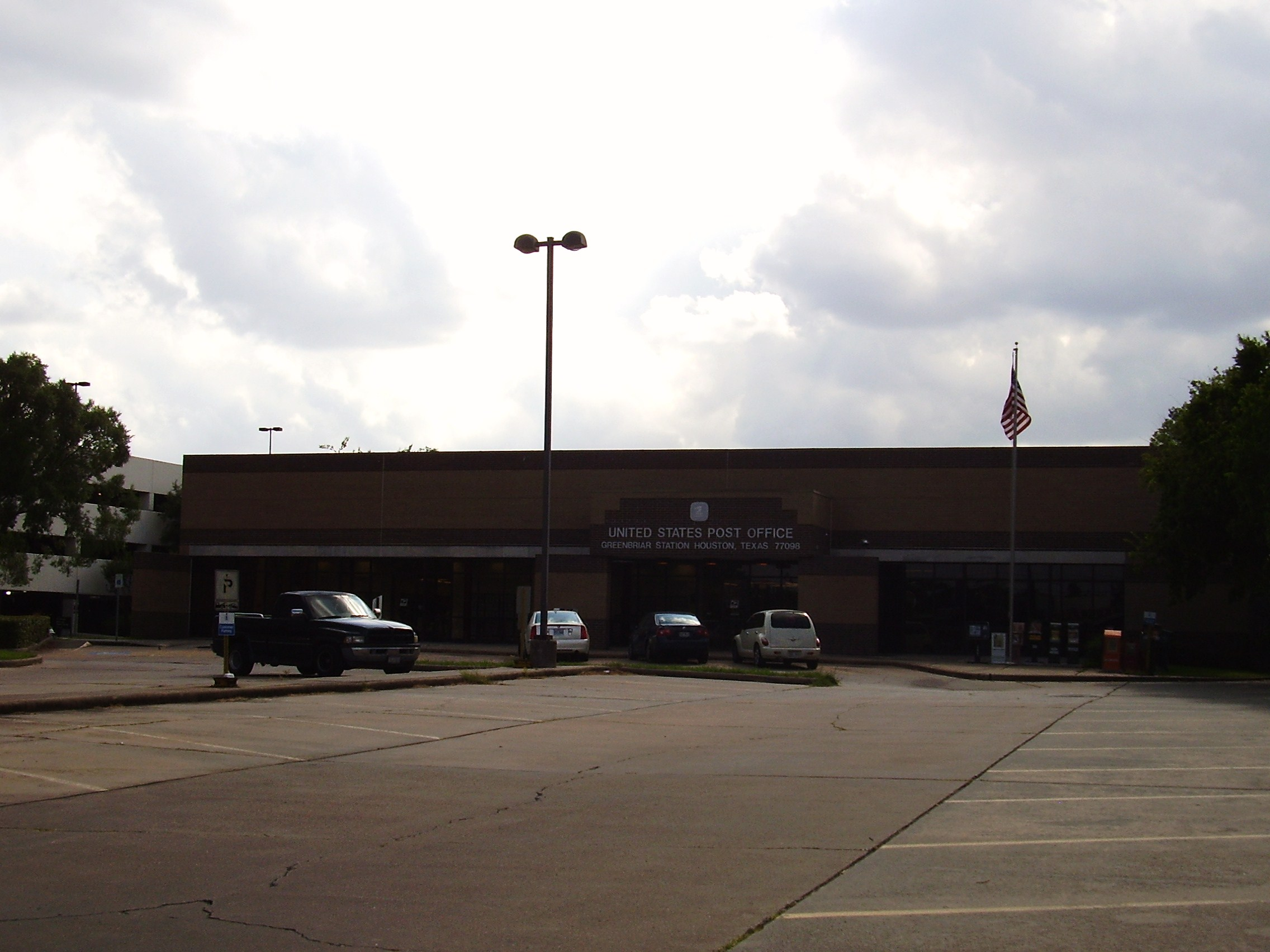
Greenbriar Station Post Office

Two Harris County precincts, 1 and 4, serve sections of Upper Kirby. Patrol services are contracted to the Harris County Precinct 1 Constable's Office.

The Texas Department of Criminal Justice (TDCJ) operates the Houston II Parole Office in Upper Kirby. At one time the Texas Youth Commission Houston District Office was located in Upper Kirby.

Upper Kirby is in Texas's 7th congressional district. The United States Postal Service operates the Greenbriar Post Office in Upper Kirby.

Harris Health System (formerly Harris County Hospital District) designated Martin Luther King Health Center for the ZIP code 77005 and Northwest Health Center for the ZIP code 77098. The nearest public hospital is Ben Taub General Hospital in the Texas Medical Center.

== Culture, parks and recreation ==
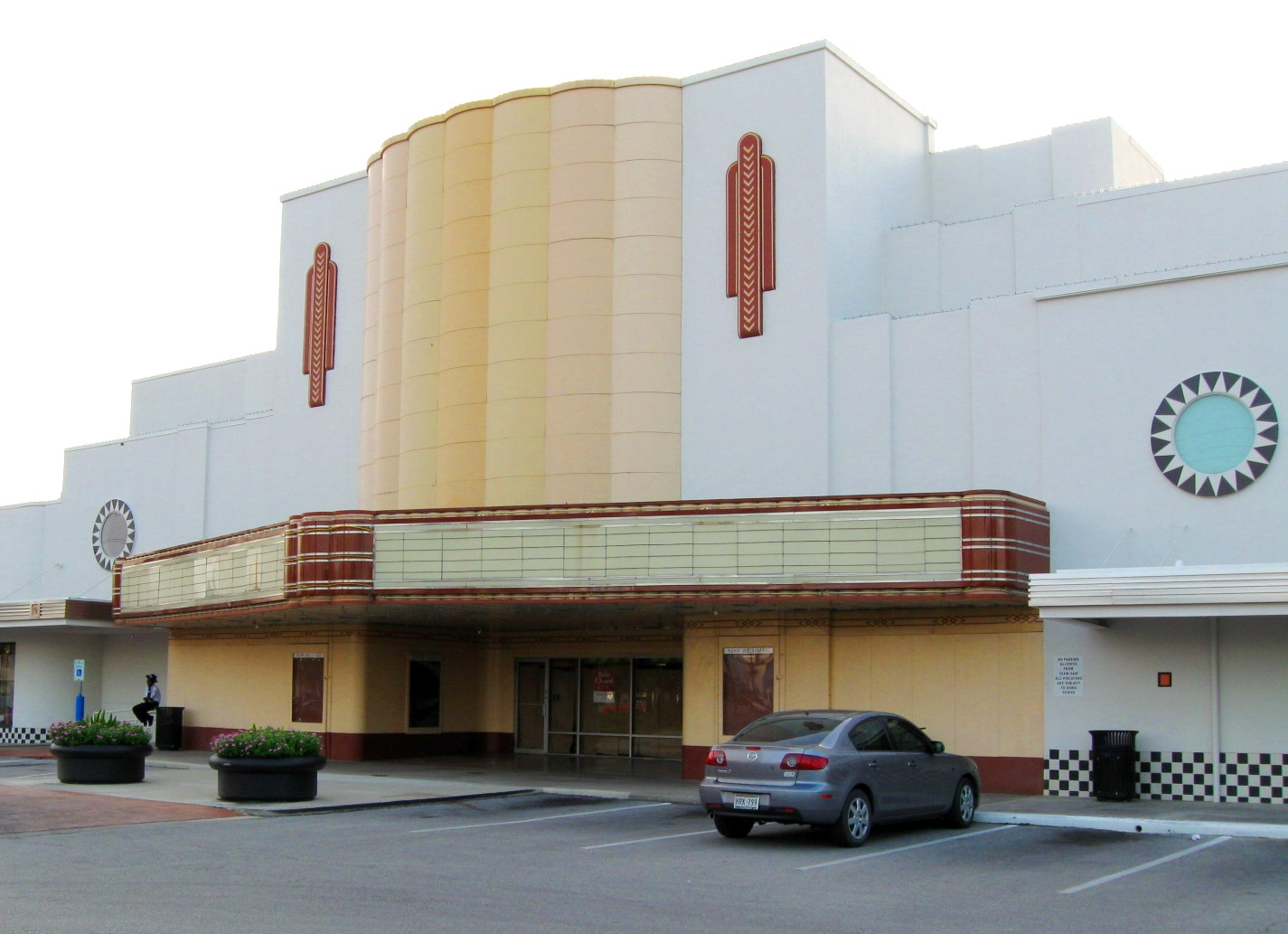
The Alabama Theatre

Katharine Schilcutt of the Houston Press said that the founders of the district desired to "forge a connection with the U.K. based solely on sharing the same initials and installing anachronistic red phone booths on random street corners".

The Upper Kirby YMCA Extension is located in Upper Kirby .

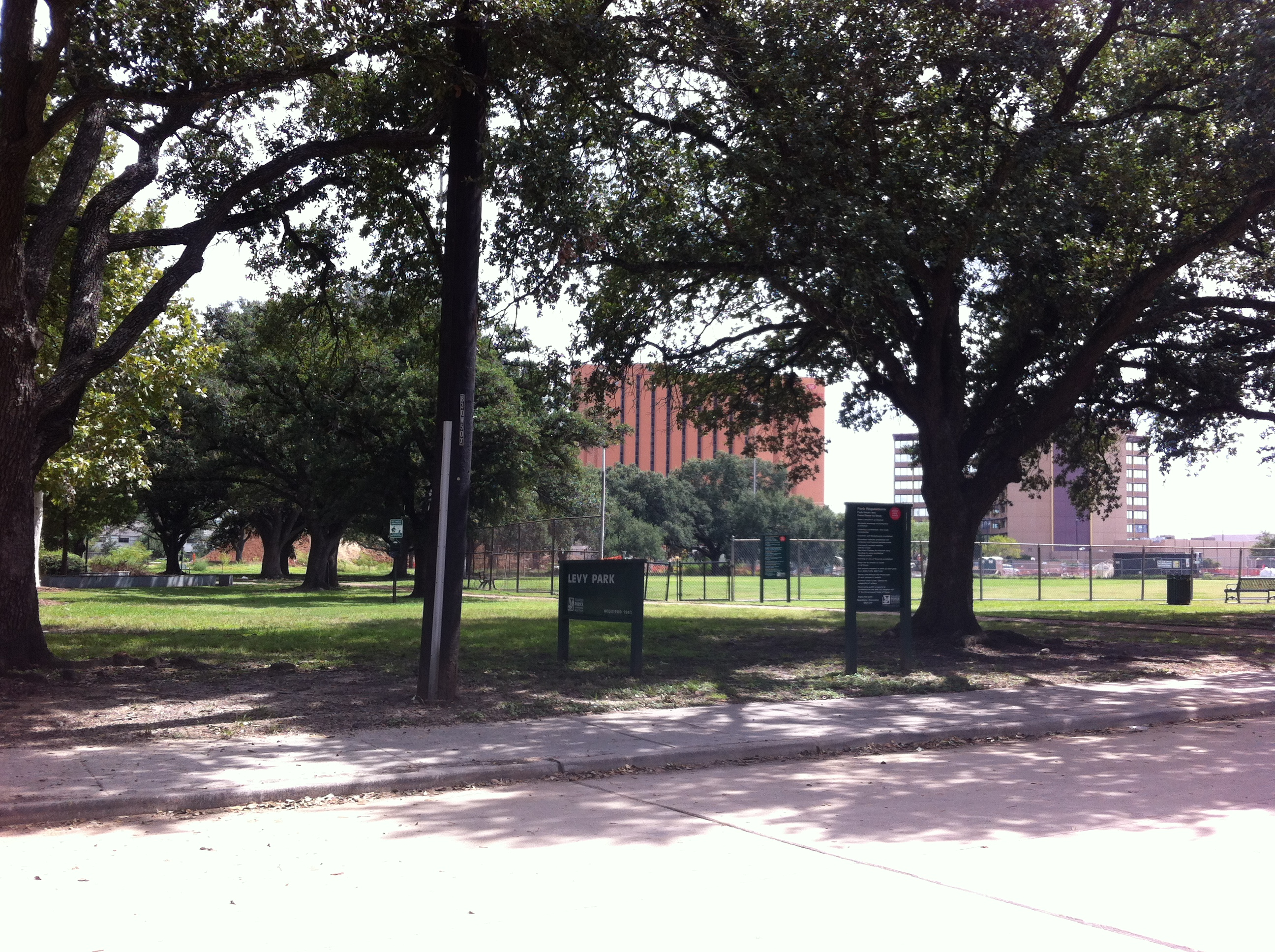
Levy Park

Upper Kirby is also home to Levy Park, operated by the City of Houston. Leon Levy gave the land that became Levy Park to the city government in 1941. The Upper Kirby district implemented a two-phase renovation project. The first, completed in 2003, included the installation of a community garden. The event to celebrate the completion of Phase II was held on September 30, 2006. Another $15 million renovation was completed in a two year period, with a grand reopening on February 25, 2017. The park also includes a dog park, performance stage and children's park with water features. The park is located in the Greenway Plaza area.

Constructed in 1939, the historic Alabama Theatre was a primary entertainment venue of the district until it was closed and later reopened as a Bookstop bookstore. Barnes & Noble acquired the Bookstop chain and, decades later, closed the story in 2009. The theater is now a Trader Joe's.

Most restaurants in Upper Kirby are chain restaurants. Shilcutt said that the restaurants in Upper Kirby were one of the aspects of Upper Kirby that she liked, that "there are some wonderful independent Houston restaurants in the mix, too" and that "while many of the restaurants are some variation on plain Jane American food [...] there's a good variety of ethnic restaurants for the adventurous."

The Islamic Society of Greater Houston (ISGH) has its headquarters in the Eastside Main Center in Upper Kirby.

== Education ==
=== Primary and secondary schools ===
Lamar High School, a public secondary school, and St. John's School, an independent K–12 school, are located in Upper Kirby.

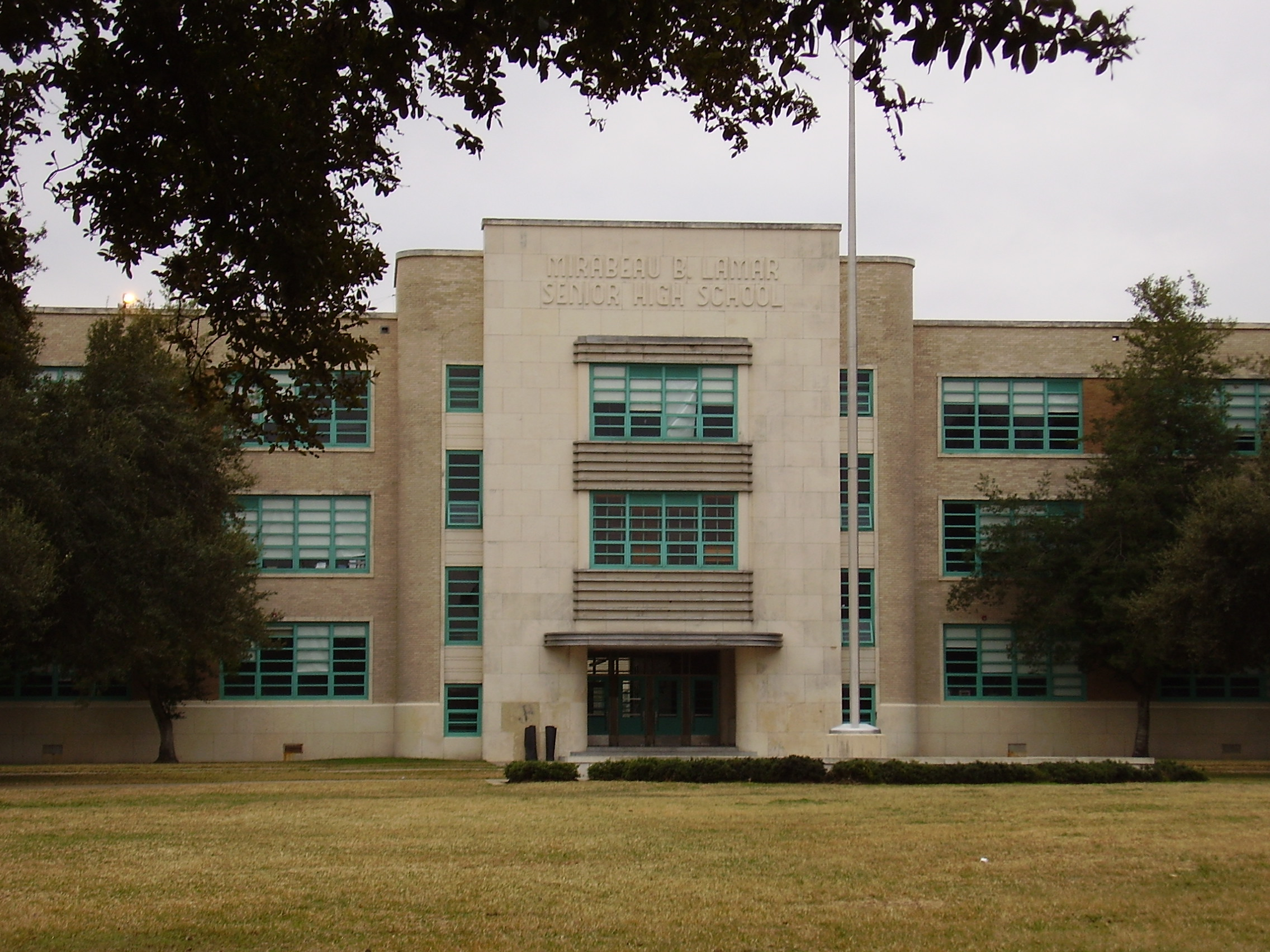
Lamar High School in Upper Kirby

Residents in Upper Kirby are zoned to schools in the Houston Independent School District. Upper Kirby is divided between Trustee District V, represented by Dianne Johnson as of 2008, and Trustee District VII, represented by Harvin C. Moore as of 2008. Johnson will no longer serve as a board member after 2009.

Several elementary schools, including Poe, River Oaks, and West University serve sections of Upper Kirby. Lanier Middle School and Pershing Middle School serve separate sections of Upper Kirby. Pin Oak Middle School is an option for Pershing-zoned residents. All of Upper Kirby is zoned to Lamar High School.

=== Public libraries ===
The community is served by the Adele B. Looscan Neighborhood Library of Houston Public Library. The current Looscan Branch building opened in September 2007. The former Americans with Disabilities Act non-compliant library, which was established in 1956, closed on August 27, 2005 and was demolished in February 2006.

The previous Looscan branch had around 61,000 visitors in the fiscal year 2005. The original plans for Looscan called for the library to get a $5.37 million renovation. An Upper Kirby group proposed a new site near the Upper Kirby YMCA. Around that period the group Friends for Neighborhood Libraries began raising funds. The replacement library, with a cost of $6.2 million, had twice the staff and two and one half times the size of the previous facility. Friends of Neighborhood Libraries had raised $1 million in four months, and around $2.5 million in total to help fund the new library; the group spent about $30,000 for the expenses.

== Media ==
The Jewish Herald-Voice has its offices in Upper Kirby.

The River Oaks Examiner is a local newspaper distributed in the community.

The Houston Chronicle is the area regional newspaper.

KTRK-TV, the ABC News-owned news outlet for the Houston-area, is located in the neighborhood on Bissonnet Street.

== Gallery ==
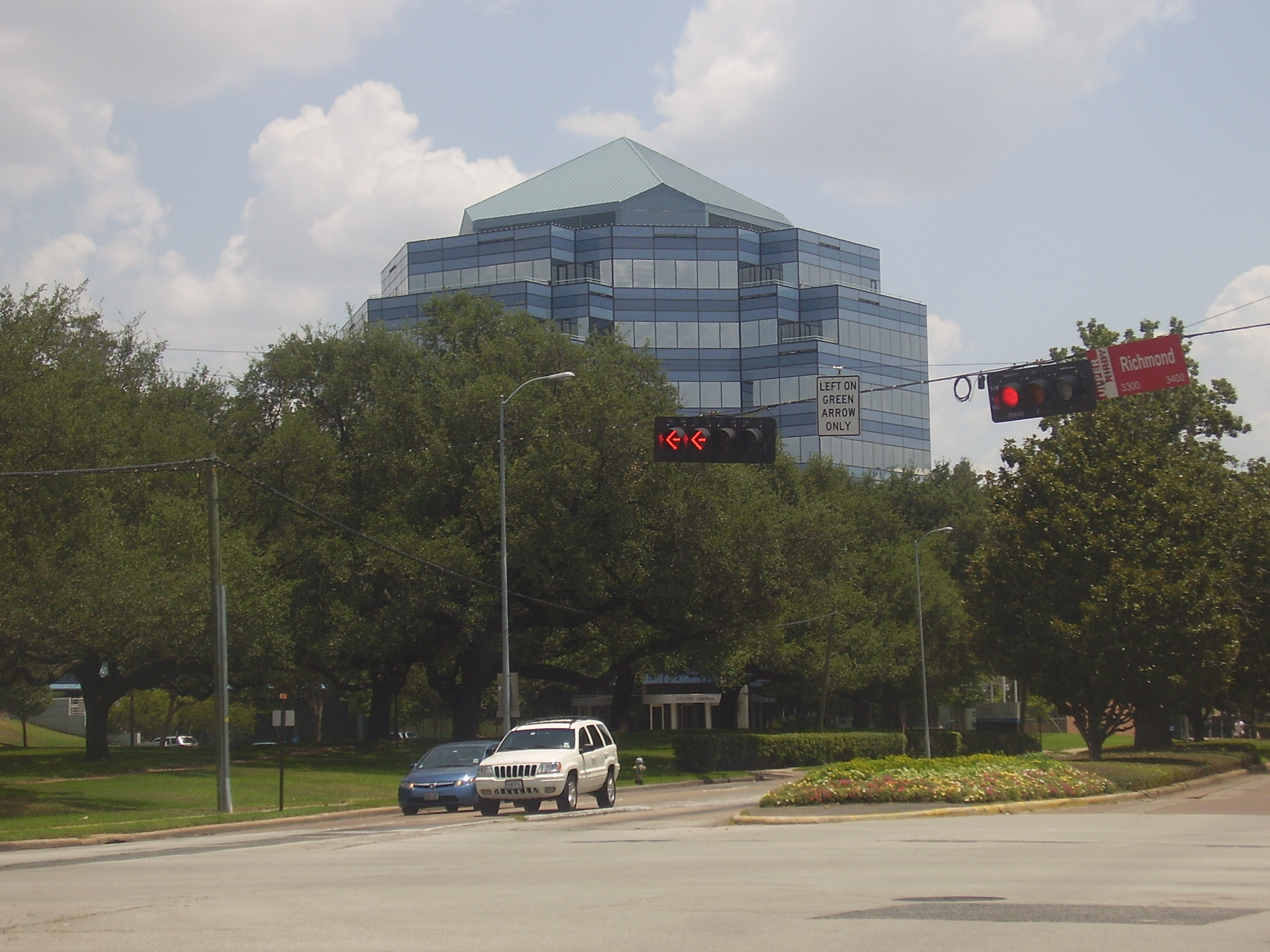
Solvay America offices

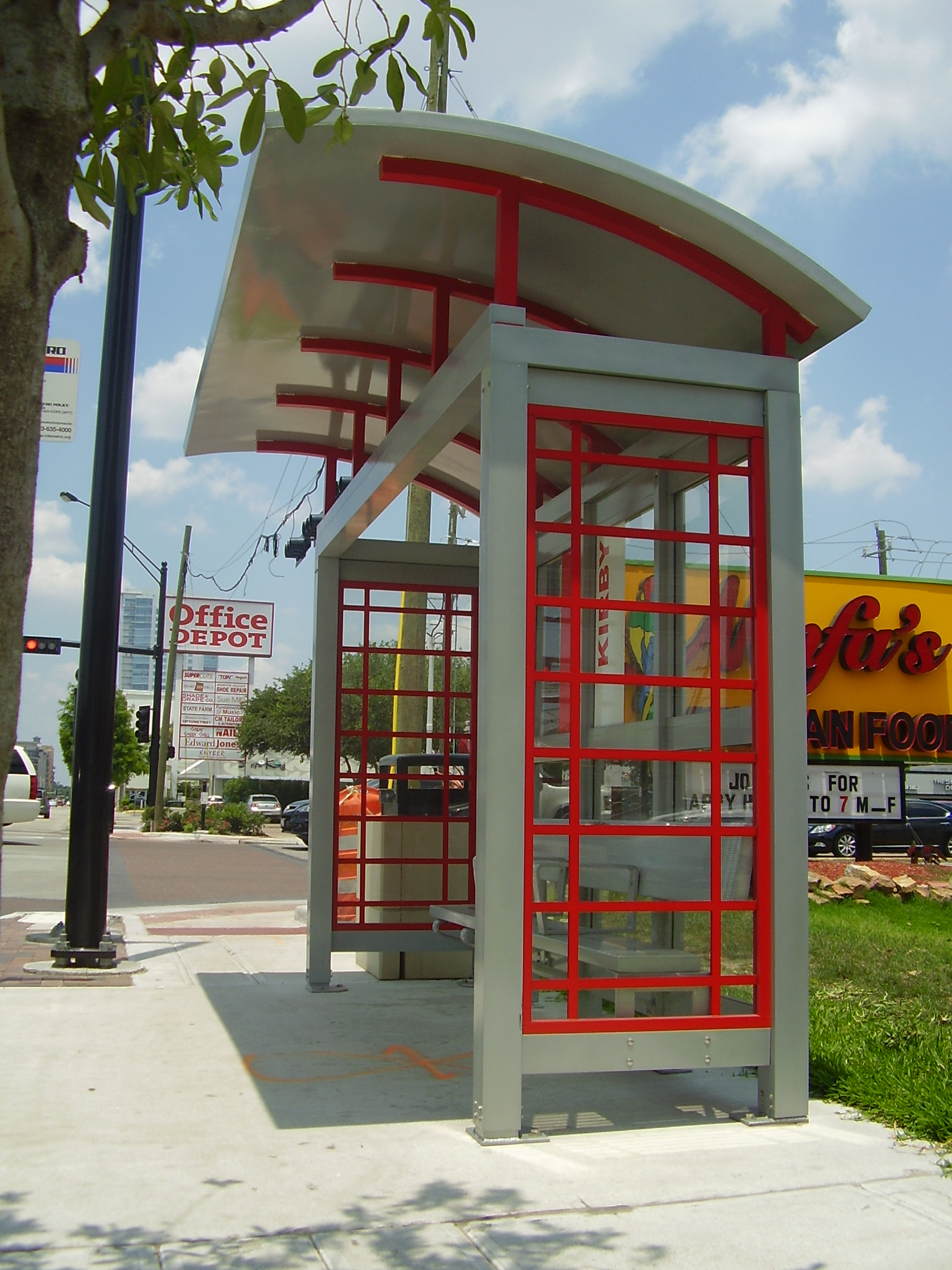
Upper Kirby bus shelter
