= River Oaks Elementary School (Houston) =

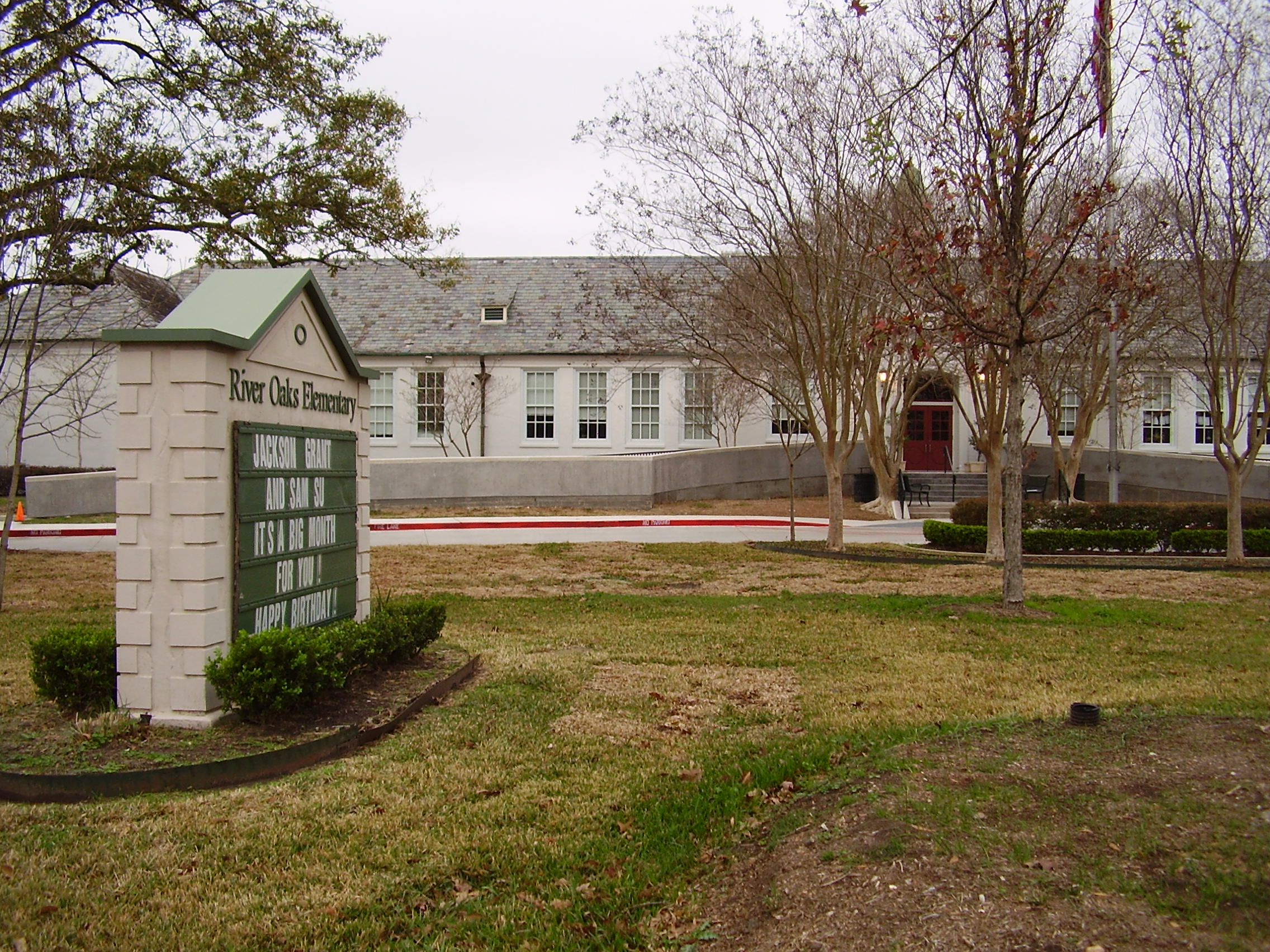

Location
- 2008 Kirby Drive; Houston, Texas 77019; United States; 29.747422°N 95.419608°W

Information
- Type: Public
- Motto: Where learning is elementary
- Established: 1929; 97 years ago
- School district: Houston ISD
- Principal: William Dedrick
- Teaching staff: 37.00 (FTE (2018–19)
- Grades: K-5
- Enrollment: 675 (2018–19)
- Student to teacher ratio: 18.24∶1 (2018–19)
- Campus: Urban
- Colors: Green, White
- Mascot: Roadrunners
- Communities served: River Oaks, Avalon Place, Oak Estates, and Royden Oaks
- Website: www.houstonisd.org/riveroakseib

River Oaks Elementary School is a magnet school, and neighborhood school, part of the Houston Independent School District. It is located in the River Oaks neighborhood of Houston, Texas, United States As of 2024, William Dedrick is the principal.

It houses one of several gifted and talented programs, referred to as "Vanguard" programs, in Houston ISD. The school's motto is "Where discovery is elementary". Its mascot is the roadrunner.

River Oaks Elementary School has an accelerated multidisciplinary curriculum. It became one of the first three elementary schools in Texas to get authorization for the International Baccalaureate Primary Years Programme (the primary school division of the IB program) during the 2002 - 2003 school year, and the curriculum was changed accordingly during the same school year.

== History ==
=== Early history ===
River Oaks Elementary was designed by architect Harry D. Payne, who, in 1926, arrived in Houston after being hired by the Houston Independent School District to design the school. Payne gave the same floor plan to River Oaks, Briscoe, Field, Henderson, Poe, and Wharton elementaries. He insisted on giving each school a unique exterior. Payne said that River Oaks' design was one of his favorite designs. Landscaping architect William M. Anderson created the landscaping plans. The River Oaks Corporation provided the land that the school was built on, which was worth $50,000; the corporation wanted the school to be built as soon as possible, so it sold the land at half price to HISD.

Ima Hogg, Mrs. Agnese Carter Nelms, and Mrs. Pat Houstoun originally considered founding a private school, but after they approved of the philosophy of HISD superintendent Edison Oberholtzer, they supported his efforts. Since HISD distributed most of its funds to junior and high schools, the "Supplementary Aids committee" founded by Hogg and the other women funded a furnished library for River Oaks. Hogg, HISD officials, and a group of mothers selected Eva Margaret Davis as the school's first principal. Estelle Sharp, Hugh Potter, and the Hoggs created a telephone campaign which had River Oaks mothers make telephone calls to persuade Edison E. Oberholtzer, the HISD superintendent, into modeling the school's education program after John Dewey's ideals. River Oaks opened in 1929.

As the school grew, more classrooms were added. First permanent additions were built. Later temporary buildings were set up on the school grounds. In 1974 most of River Oaks was assigned to River Oaks Elementary School.

River Oaks Elementary was originally an all-White school; it was desegregated in 1970. The "ESG" (Elementary School for the Gifted) program was established shortly afterwards. It was not the first magnet program in Houston, as High School for the Performing and Visual Arts (HSPVA) was the first.

Prior to desegregation, River Oaks Elementary had around 800 children. After desegregation, many parents removed their children from River Oaks Elementary, and the school was far below capacity. River Oaks became exclusively a public magnet school in 1986; during the previous school year a total of 60 students were residents of the River Oaks neighborhood. At the time River Oaks had mainly older families. At the time the remaining families who did have children had the money to send their children to private school and preferred to do so.

From 1986 to 1995, up to 50% of the houses in River Oaks had changed ownership. By 1995 River Oaks Elementary had a waiting list, and it became one of the most prestigious public elementary schools in Houston. By that year several new families had established themselves in River Oaks and many of them were interested in sending their children to public school.

=== Vanguard and neighborhood program controversy ===
On March 2, 1995, HISD board trustee Ron Franklin introduced a request by the River Oaks neighborhood to have a neighborhood school at the board table. Parents from River Oaks pressured the school into adding back a neighborhood program. Some Vanguard parents felt concern with the proposal, because they liked the Vanguard program and feared that introducing neighborhood children would adulterate the Vanguard program, believing that River Oaks parents would use political influence and money to have underqualified children admitted to the Vanguard program. Some parents believed that the River Oaks neighborhood program would reduce racial diversity at the school. In 1995 the school had about 500 students, with 40% White, 30% Black, 28% Hispanic, and 1% Asian. Large numbers of parents who were White, Black, and Hispanic protested against the proposal. Donald R. McAdams, a former HISD trustee and the author of Fighting to Save Our Urban Schools-- and Winning!: Lessons from Houston, stated that Vanguard parents were afraid of having to give up complete control over the school and share power with neighborhood parents.

During that year, the HISD school board voted on a proposal to open the school to neighborhood parents. The four White board members voted in favor, while the five non-White board members voted against it. Lana Shadwick, an assistant attorney of the Harris County government, campaigned for the HISD board to allow neighborhood enrollment at River Oaks. Two board members, Esther Campos and Robert Jefferson, said that an entity, through intermediaries at the request of Shadwick, offered $50,000 in board election campaign contributions if they would change their votes, and threatened to rally a group of parents to campaign for their opponents if they did not change their votes. Jose Salazar, the intermediary who contacted Campos, said that no such offer had ever been made. McAdams stated that the controversy caused public attention to focus on the HISD board and its racial makeup.

In an editorial, the Houston Chronicle staff argued that "Until there is another vote, HISD should continue its work to improve all of HISD's neighborhood schools to lessen concerns that a child must qualify for some kind of magnet program and be bussed across town to be assured a quality education," and that the voting was done out of decentralization and not racial reasons, and so the perception that it was racial "helps to give the issue a racial tinge it does not deserve, which only serves to aggravate an already tense situation."

Laurie Bricker, a white HISD board member, introduced a new plan that allowed parents of Vanguard students to include their non-Vanguard children in the neighborhood classes along with River Oaks neighborhood students. Bricker had the neighborhood program as a phase-in to appease Vanguard parents but some minority HISD trustees did not like that aspect of her program. On March 21, 1996, the board voted in favor of Bricker's program 5–2, with 2 abstaining. Many neighborhood parents accepted the plan. Some Vanguard parents had objected. McAdams said that this vote ended the River Oaks controversy.

In the 1996–1997 school year, River Oaks Elementary introduced the neighborhood program, with for grades kindergarten through 2 admitted immediately. Grades 3 through 5 were grandfathered into the system. Prior to the rezoning, parts of the River Oaks neighborhood were zoned to Wilson Elementary School (now Baker Montessori School) in Neartown, while other parts were zoned to Will Rogers Elementary School (which closed after the 2005–2006 school year), and other parts were zoned to Poe Elementary School in Boulevard Oaks.

=== Post-controversy ===
In 2001 Lisa Gray of the Houston Press described River Oaks as having the "most popular" elementary-level Vanguard program in HISD.

River Oaks Elementary celebrated its 75th anniversary in the 2003–2004 school year. Jeff Bezos, a River Oaks alumnus, spoke at a luncheon during this event.

A new addition, which replaced temporary buildings, began construction during winter 2005 and was completed in summer 2007. The lead architect was Joiner Partnership, Incorporated, and the lead project manager was Heery International.

== Campus ==
The campus is located at Kirby Drive and San Felipe Road, in proximity to the River Oaks Country Club. As of November 2008 the school building has 7,570 square feet (703 m^{2}) of space, and its site is 15-acre (6.1 ha). The school, which has a color like that of sand, has a Colonial Revival/French colonial architectural style. The design, using natural slate, a Texas limestone exterior, and a light buff stucco, received inspiration from smaller French chateaux and buildings in New Orleans.

The original building was in an "H" shape, with the auditorium in the back. The original plan situated that 5 acres (2.0 ha) would be dedicated to a play area with three playgrounds, with one for younger children of both sexes, one for older boys, and one for older girls, as well as a basketball court, a baseball diamond for students of both sexes, gymnastic equipment, jumping pits, a track, sand boxes, swings for smaller children, and a volleyball court. The playground for smaller children was to be located in the center of the play area tract, the playground for older boys was to be located on the south side of the play tract, and the playground for older girls was to be located on the north side of the play tract. The plan called for trees to be planted parallel to sidewalks along Avalon Road, Kirby Drive, and San Felipe Road. The auditorium was built square-shaped.

Its kindergarten area once housed a fireplace, which, along with its chimney, was given to the school by Ima Hogg. In 2005 the fireplace was moved to the teacher's lounge during renovations, and it was later placed in the attic. As of 2010 there were efforts to restore the fireplace, with donations being the source of funding. Azalea flowers, used in the landscaping of various Houston landmarks, have been present in the landscaping of this school.

In November 2008 the alumni of River Oaks Elementary started a campaign to raise $3.4 million ($5084234.93 when adjusted for inflation) to build a new library. They had already received a $1 million ($1495363.21 when adjusted for inflation) gift. The plans for the library included a reading area with 16,500 books, a technology center with 32 computers, and a courtyard. Jennifer Radcliffe of the McClatchy - Tribune Business News said "The addition would put the River Oaks library -- which already has one of the largest collections in HISD -- head and shoulders above other campuses." Barry Bishop, a director of library information at the Spring Branch Independent School District, said that the expansion of the River Oaks Elementary library "kind of shakes the equity issue" but because schools with poorer pupils have access to federal funds, foundation funds, and grants inaccessible to schools with wealthier student bodies, "If you actually look at the money spent per student, at least from the library perspective, it kind of balances out." A neighborhood activist from Sunnyside, Alice Pradia, argued that HISD did not do enough to bolster libraries of school campuses.

River Oaks Elementary has a "nature center", which opened in 1990, which has various plants as well as several insects and smaller animals in it.

== Demographics ==
As of the 2011–2012 school year, River Oaks Elementary had 717 students. 50% were White, 20% were Asian or Pacific Islander, 16% were Hispanic, 7% were black, and less than 1% were Native American. 8% of students qualified for free and reduced lunch.

As of 2014 about 56% of the elementary school-aged students living in the River Oaks Elementary attendance boundary attended River Oaks Elementary, according to HISD estimates.

Donald R. McAdams wrote that in 1995, at the time of the political turf battle involving River Oaks Elementary and neighborhood students, River Oaks was a "middle class school." The student mix was 40% White, 30% Black, 28% Hispanic, and 1% Asian. 9% of students qualified for free and reduced lunch. According to HISD standards, all of the students were gifted and talented. McAdams wrote that most of the minority children classified as gifted and talented by HISD came from middle class households. In 1995, the largest group of River Oaks Elementary School parents resided in the City of West University Place and nearby neighborhoods.

McAdams wrote that in 1995 White parents liked the demographics because there was a "high-cost, first class education in an almost perfect ethnic mix, and all this with ethnic harmony." McAdams wrote that the demographics made the school attractive to River Oaks parents who wanted to send their children there.

== Academics and gifted and talented designation ==
Donald R. McAdams wrote that in 1995 River Oaks was "not really full of gifted children". He cited the fact that, at the time, HISD put ethnic balances on the gifted and talented roster, with no more than 35% White and Asian and at least 65% Black and Hispanic overall, leading many White and Asian children to be excluded. In addition McAdams cited the mechanisms for gifted testing at the time. As of 1995, under Texas state law a gifted child was defined as one in the 95th percentile. Testing for gifted and talented status took place at Kindergarten. McAdams wrote that many children identified as gifted under this formula were simply well-educated by their parents and that this became apparent in the third grade. However a school would not dismiss a child already identified as gifted at that point. In 1997 HISD removed the ethnic guidelines to Vanguard enrollment after a reverse discrimination lawsuit was filed in a federal court.

McAdams wrote that in 1995, compared to other Vanguard programs River Oaks test scores were on the "low" side. McAdams stated that eight neighborhood schools in trustee district 5, his district, had higher average test scores than River Oaks. Those schools had minority enrollments from 27% to 52%.

== Attendance boundary and feeder patterns ==
All students who are zoned to River Oaks are also zoned to Lanier Middle School, and Lamar High School.

One condominium complex zoned to River Oaks Elementary is The Huntingdon.

== Notable alumni ==
- Jeff Bezos, former richest man in the world, founder and CEO of Amazon.com
- Linda Ellerbee
- Adrian Garcia (member of the Houston City Council)
- John Gray, author of Men Are From Mars, Women Are From Venus
- Fred Hofheinz (former Mayor of Houston)

== Notes ==
https://www.houstonisd.org/domain/12283
