= Buffalo Speedway =

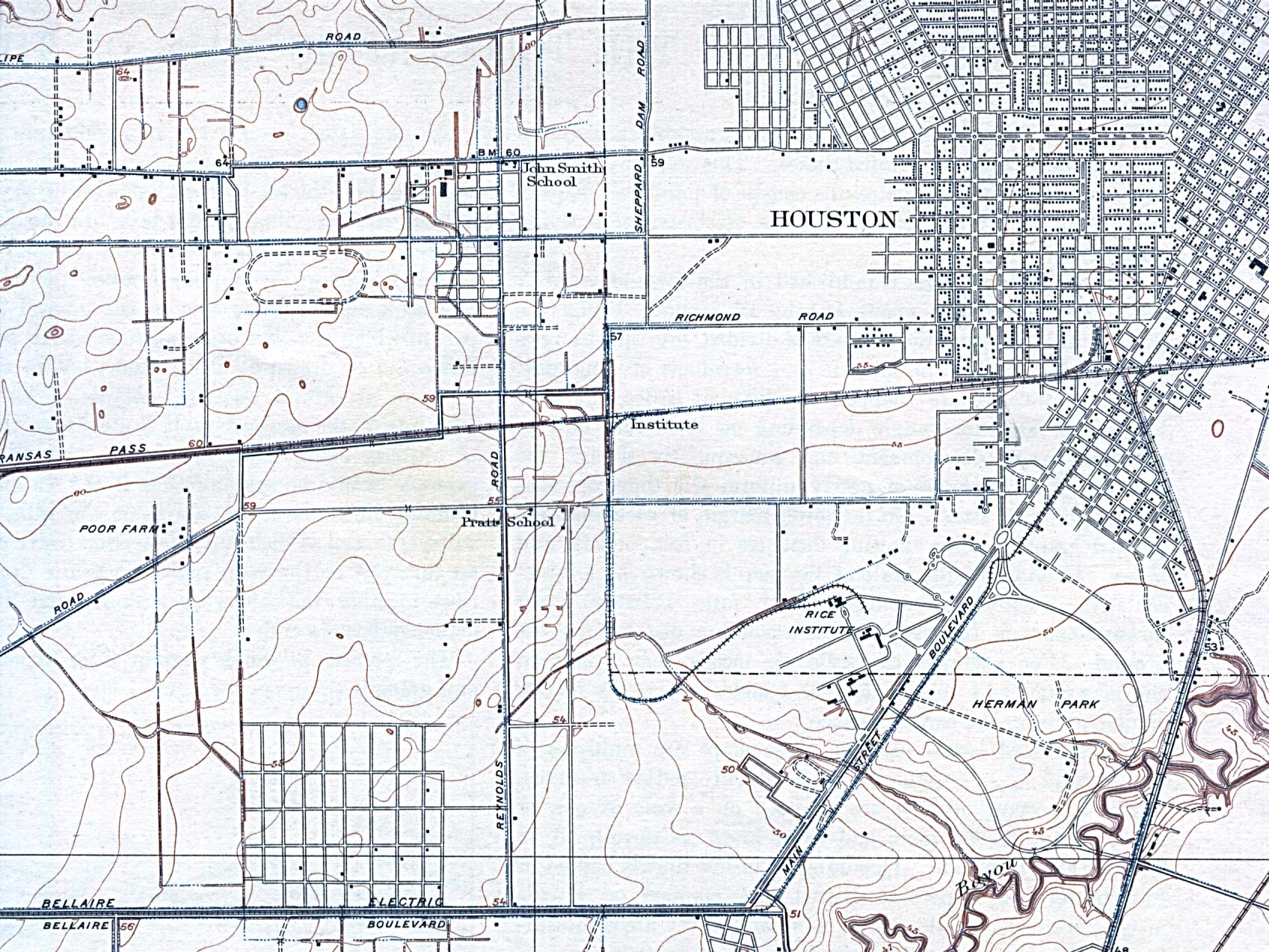
1921 road map of Houston showing oval race track in approximate location of northern terminus of Buffalo Speedway.

Buffalo Speedway is a street in Houston, Texas. It starts in the upper class River Oaks neighborhood on the west side of Houston at an intersection with Westheimer Road. The south terminus was previously located at West Bellfort Street on the southwest side. An extension farther south to Holmes Road was proposed in late 2014. The extension to Holmes Road finished construction in the first quarter of 2015. In 2016, a further extension southward to West Airport Boulevard was already underway.

According to some, the "speedway" part of the name comes from a section of the road that was long and straight where it was possible to attain high speeds. When Buffalo Drive's name became Allen Parkway, the "Buffalo" name was open to use on another street. Explanations of the "buffalo" part of the name include the popularity of the word buffalo around the time of the road's naming and the replacement of Buffalo Drive by the Allen Parkway. Old USGS maps suggest the existence of a race track where Buffalo Speedway would later be built. Historian and retired land researcher Ann Quin Wilson says that a speedway existed near the site of today's Lamar High School, which would have been at the intersection of Buffalo Drive (now Allen Parkway) and where the Buffalo Speedway would later be built.

The race track indicated on the 1922 map attached was a horse racing track owned by Mitchell Louis Westheimer, a German immigrant and businessman who sold that portion of his farm for the construction of Lamar High School in 1937. Since the track was built for horses and predated most organized dirt-oval motor racing in the United States, it is unlikely that the "speedway" name descended from the track itself.

A more fanciful theory is that the name is a humorous reference to the fact that it crosses Bissonnet Street. The need for a "bison net" at this location is explained by the name Buffalo Speedway.

Some road signs refer to it as Buffalo Spdwy or Buffalo Spwy, with speedway taking the place of other designations like road or street.

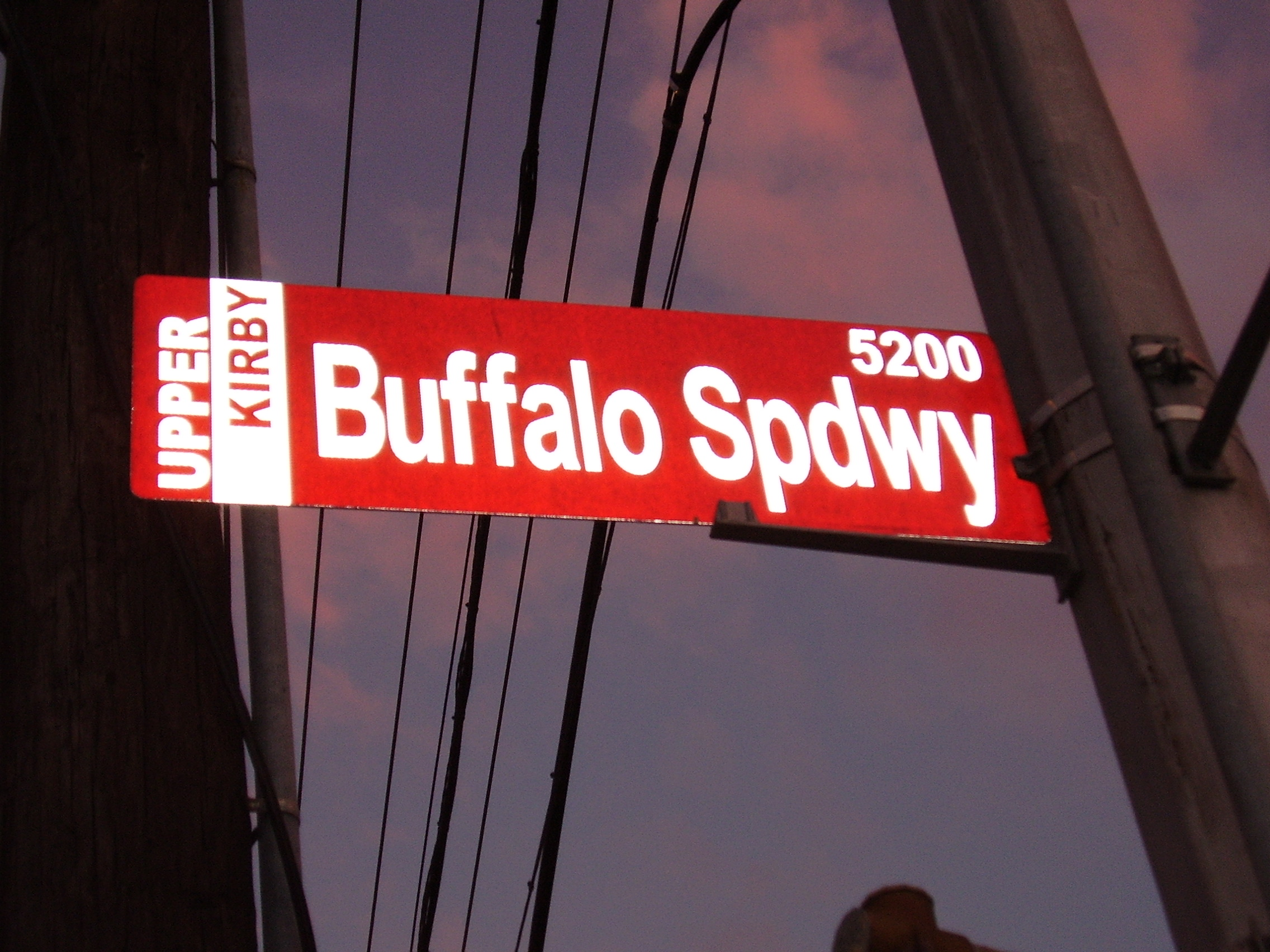
An Upper Kirby street sign showing the Buffalo Speedway.

== Graphic novel ==
Buffalo Speedway is the title of a graphic novel about pizza delivery drivers in Houston. Written and Illustrated by Yehudi Mercado.
