= Southampton, Houston =

Neighborhood in Houston, Texas

Coordinates: 29.723°N 95.411°W

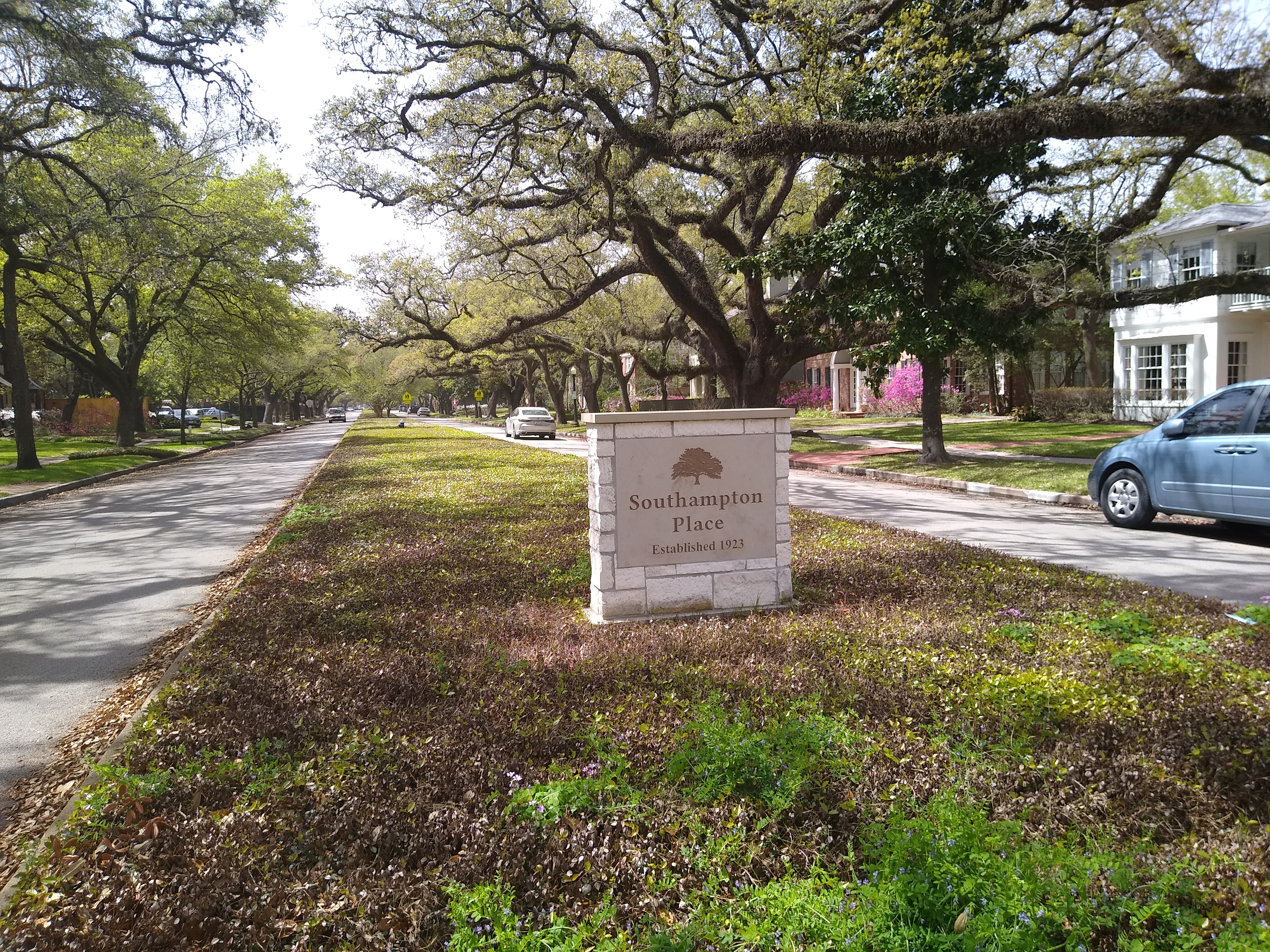
Southampton

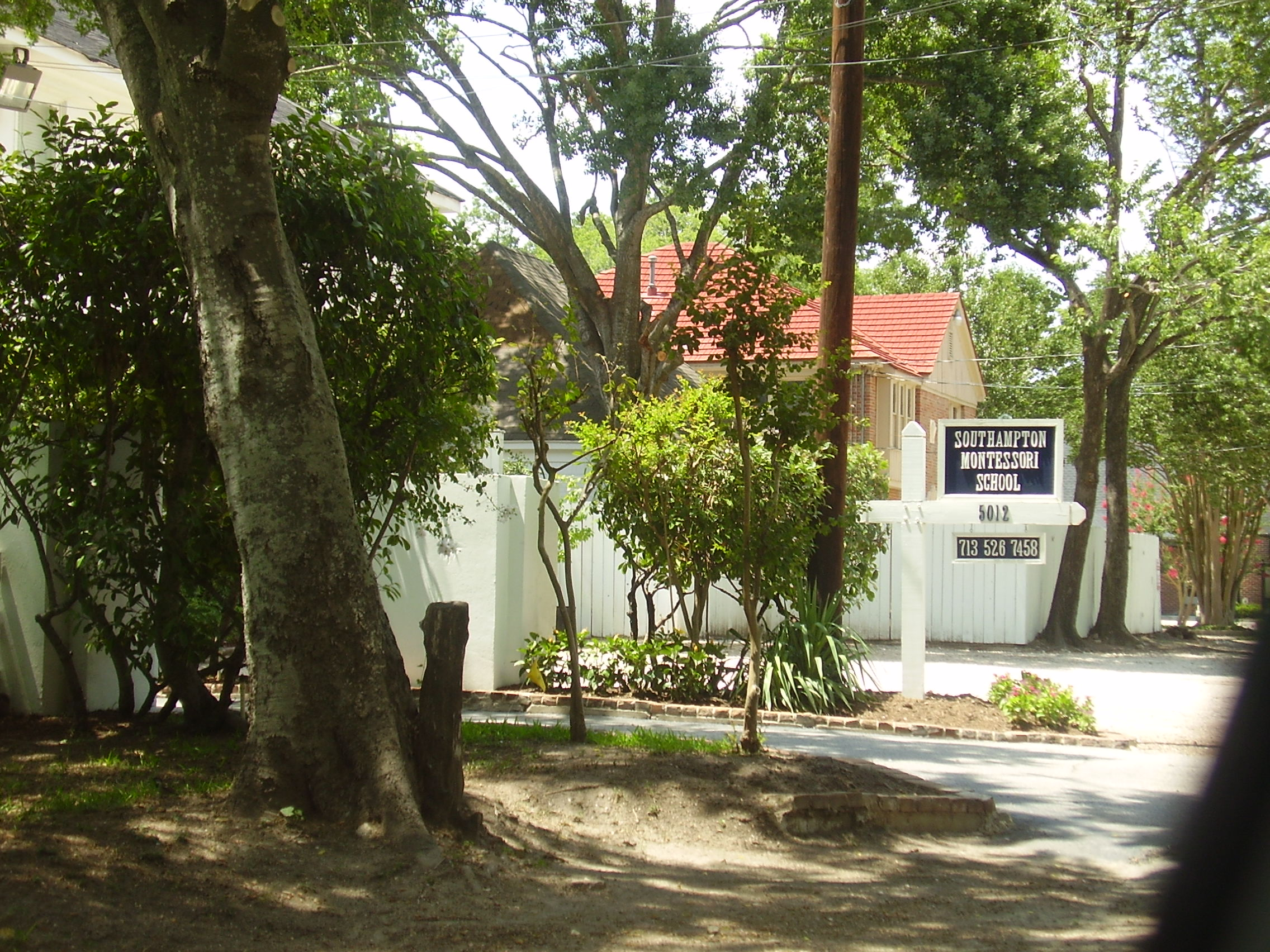
Southampton Montessori School

Southampton Place, also known as Southampton, is a neighborhood located in Houston, Texas. The Southampton Civic Club Inc. is the homeowners' association.

== History ==
E.H. Fleming developed Southampton in the 1920s. The Southampton Civic Club was formed after a meeting on May 24, 1929.

When some land appraisals doubled from 1990 to 1991, over 30% of Southampton residents protested. The Harris County Appraisal District said that because tear-down development, causing smaller older houses to be replaced with larger newer houses, is occurring, then one expects to see an increase in valuation. Values leveled off in some nearby communities.

Around 2007 the company Buckhead Investment Partners Inc. proposed building a 23 story high rise building, called the Ashby High Rise, at a site at 1717 Bissonnet at Ashby. Many residents of Southampton opposed the developer's plan. Several residents of Southampton and Boulevard Oaks formed a task force intended to oppose the development, and they hired Rusty Hardin, an attorney, to help with the efforts.

== Cityscape ==
Southampton is in proximity to Rice University, the Houston Museum District, the Texas Medical Center, and Downtown Houston. The community has large numbers of live oak trees along Rice Boulevard and Sunset Boulevard. Katherine Feser of the Houston Chronicle said that the trees were "are a hallmark of the neighborhood." Bill Merriman, an architect living in Southampton, said that the model of trees, which he described as orderly, was adapted to many newer master-planned communities such as First Colony in Fort Bend County. Feser said that lot sizes in Southampton were larger than lot sizes in Southgate.

=== Houses ===
In 2000 Southampton had 601 houses. Southampton's housing stock includes brick cottages, bungalows, and classical Georgian houses. The houses used side porches and used large wooden windows to help with cooling in the pre-air conditioning era. The houses have alley accesses behind them, which allow for vehicles and trash to be kept out of sight from the street and for more green space to be placed in front of houses. By 1999 many of the older houses had been remodeled to the tastes of contemporary families. Feser said that a typical remodeling project in Southampton included an addition of a master bath suite, an expansion of the kitchen, and an addition of a den.

As of 2000 the houses were very expensive and in demand due to the community's central location. In 1999, Edie Archer of Greenwood King Properties said that most houses sold between $300,000 ($566260.49 in today's money) to $600,000 ($1132520.97 in today's money). During that year, two renovated older houses sold for over $1 million ($1887534.96 in today's money) each, and some recently built stucco-style and Mediterranean-style houses sold for closer to $600,000 ($1132520.97 in today's money), while some cottages in the periphery of Southampton sold for below $300,000 ($566260.49 in today's money). Archer said that houses typically sold for $50,000 to $100,000 more in 2000 than they did in 1998. In 2001 the most inexpensive houses in Southampton were priced in the $300,000s (range beginning at $532738.21 in today's money).

The original Southampton documents, established around 1925 set minimum prices for house constructions. On Sunset Boulevard, the minimum prices were from $8,000 ($143438.33 in today's money) to $10,000 ($358595.83 in today's money). For Rice Boulevard the minimums were $12,000 ($215157.5 in today's money) to $15,000 ($268946.87 in today's money). For other areas, the minimums were $5,000 ($89648.96 in today's money) to $7,000 ($125508.54 in today's money).

== Demographics ==
In 2005 Allison Cook said "There's just more disposable income in Southampton, Houston, Broad Acres [sic] and storied Shadow Lawn than in Southgate".

== Government and infrastructure ==
The Southampton Civic Club Inc. is the homeowner's association.

The community has deed restrictions which require minimum set-backs from the street and prevent the establishment of businesses within the neighborhood's boundary. Katherine Feser of the Houston Chronicle said the enforcement of the restrictions helped "maintain a consistent feel" in Southampton.

Southampton is a part of the University Place Super Neighborhood Council.

The Southampton/Boulevard Oaks Patrol Service provides private security to the community and to Boulevard Oaks.

It is within Houston City Council District C.

The Houston Police Department's South Central Patrol Division, headquartered at 2022 St. Emanuel., serves the neighborhood.

Southampton is in Texas's 7th congressional district .

Harris Health System (formerly Harris County Hospital District) designated Martin Luther King Health Center in southeast Houston for ZIP code 77005. The nearest public hospital is Ben Taub General Hospital in the Texas Medical Center.

== Education ==
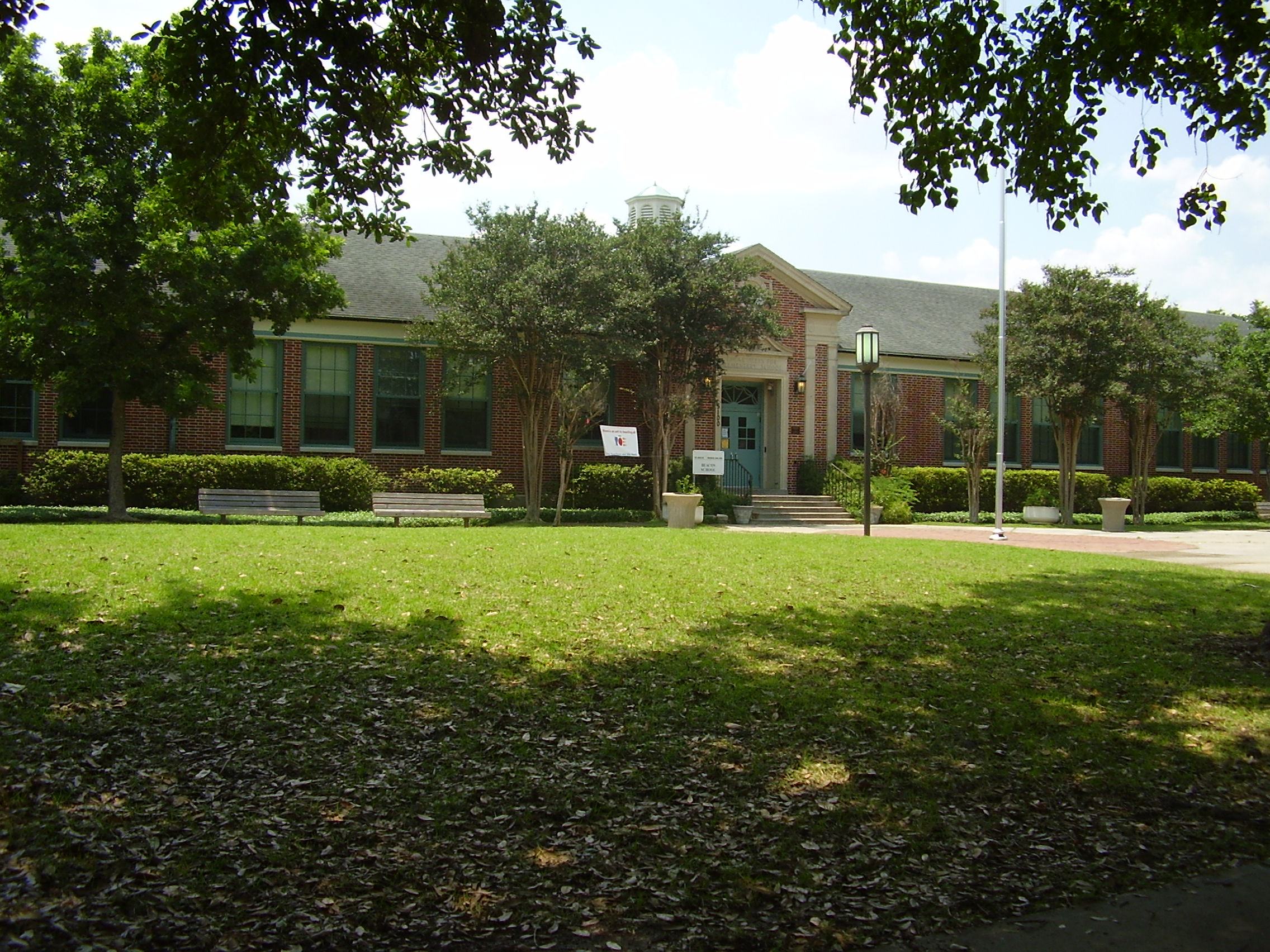
Poe Elementary School in Boulevard Oaks

The neighborhood is zoned to Houston Independent School District (HISD) schools, including Poe Elementary School (located in Boulevard Oaks), Lanier Middle School (located in Neartown), and Lamar High School (located in Upper Kirby).

The Southampton Civic Club failed to persuade HISD to build a new high school on a tract at Kirby and West Alabama. Instead Lamar High School opened on Westheimer Road.

A private school called the Southampton Montessori School is also located in the neighborhood.

Nearby is the Roman Catholic Archdiocese of Galveston-Houston's St. Vincent de Paul School.

== Postal service ==
The United States Postal Service operates the Greenbriar Post Office at 3740 Greenbriar Street, 77098-9998.

== Parks and recreation ==
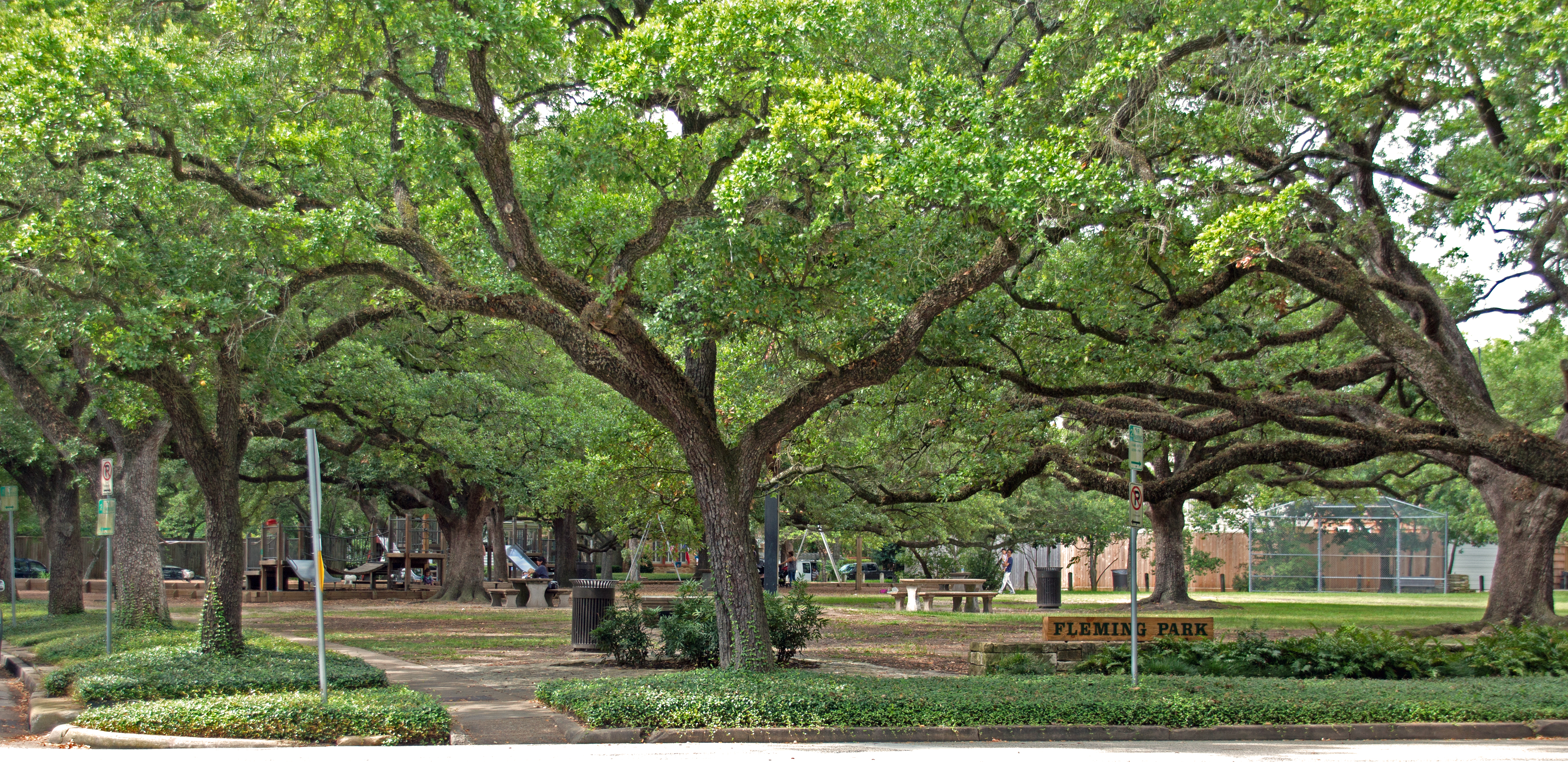
Fleming Park

Fleming Park, a City of Houston park, is located in Southampton. It has two full tennis courts, a picnic pavilion, and a playground. A "Friends of the Park" group helps maintain the park.

== Media ==
The Houston Chronicle is the area regional newspaper. On Thursdays, residents receive the Bellaire/West U/River Oaks/Meyerland local section.

The West University Examiner is a local newspaper distributed in the community .

The Village News is a local newspaper distributed in the community.

In the mid-20th century the community newspaper Southwestern Times served Southampton and surrounding communities. The paper was headquartered in Rice Village.

== See also ==
- Boulevard Oaks, Houston
