= Poe Elementary School (Houston) =

Edgar Allan Poe Elementary School
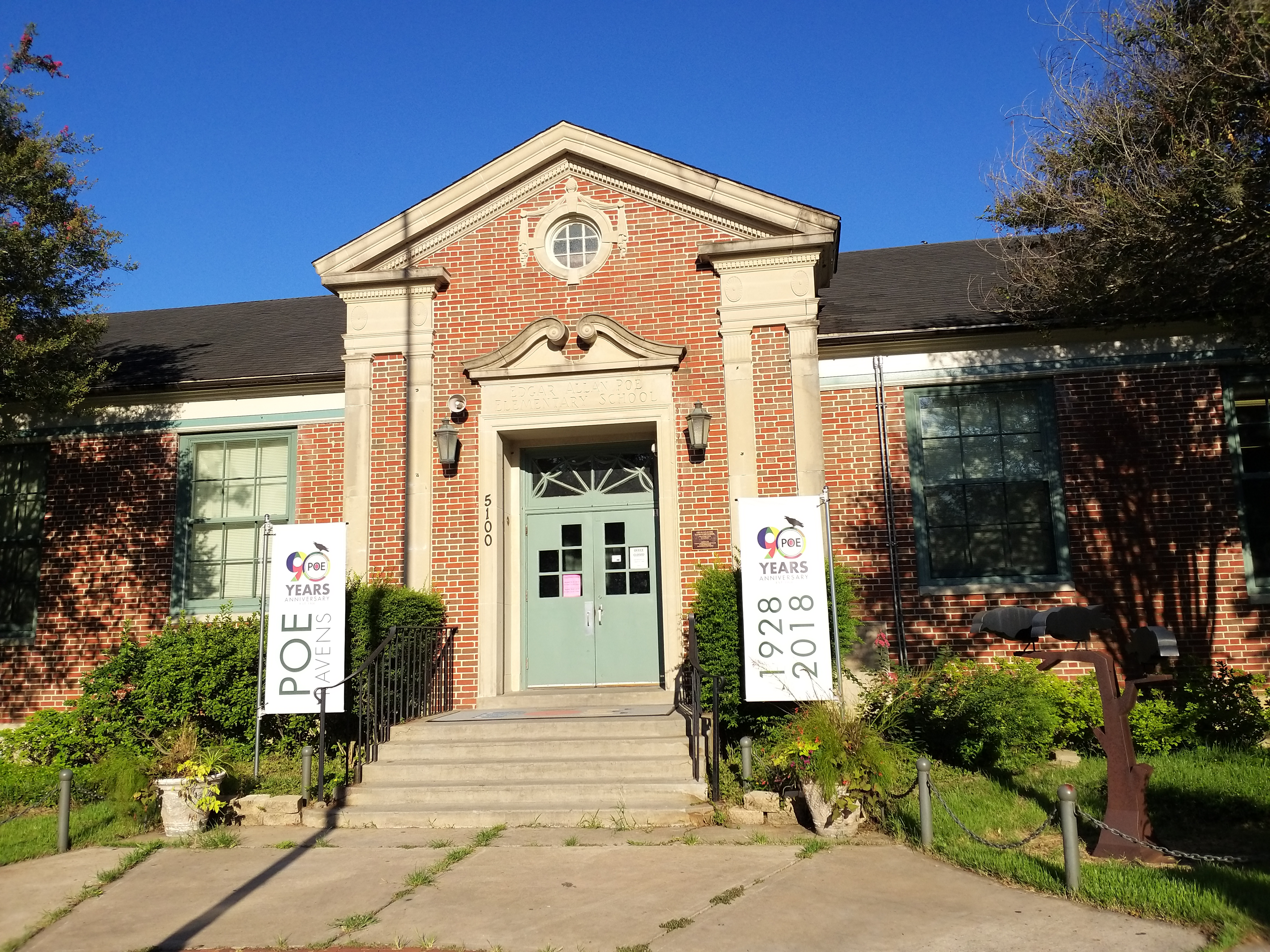

Location
- United States; 29°43′40″N 95°24′25″W

Information
- Type: Elementary school
- Established: 1928
- School district: Houston Independent School District
- Principal: Trealla Epps
- Grades: K-5th
- Communities served: Boulevard Oaks (including Broadacres), Southampton, Shadyside, Neartown (including Montrose), Houston Museum District area, a portion of Riverside Terrace, a portion of Upper Kirby, Greenway Plaza
- Website: houstonisd.org/Domain/12254

- Poe Elementary School
- U.S. Historic district – Contributing property
- Architect: Harry D. Payne
- Part of: Boulevard Oaks Historic District (ID02000117)
- Designated CP: February 22, 2002

Edgar Allan Poe Elementary School is a primary school located at 5100 Hazard Street in Houston, Texas, United States. A part of the Houston Independent School District (HISD), the school, which was built in 1928, is located in the Chevy Chase subdivision of the Boulevard Oaks neighborhood west of Rice University. The school, a National Register of Historic Places (NRHP) historic district contributing property of Boulevard Oaks, was named after Edgar Allan Poe.

Poe Elementary, as of 2001, had about 700 students. It has bilingual programs for all grade levels and a fine arts magnet program. The 1980 Houston/Harris County Metropolitan Area Southwest-Westpark Corridor Transitway Alternatives: Environmental Impact Statement of the Urban Mass Transportation Administration described Poe as "a thriving, well-integrated magnet school".

From 1974 to 2021 the Poe Cooperative Nursery School (Poe-Co), a privately operated pre-school, was located on the Poe school grounds; it was established in 1974 in order to revive enrollment at Poe Elementary. It earned National Association for the Education of Young Children (NAEYC) accreditation in 1991, making it the first parent cooperative preschool to do so. Poe-Co moved from the Poe Elementary grounds after HISD removed private preschools from public school properties.

== History ==
Poe was established in 1928. It was originally an elementary school reserved for white people and others who were not black. It was previously called "Chevy Chase Elementary School".

The Poe Elementary School bombing occurred on September 15, 1959, when a man named Paul Orgeron detonated a bomb during recess at Poe Elementary School, killing himself, a teacher (Jennie Katharine Kolter), a custodian (James Arlie Montgomery, for which Montgomery Elementary was named), and three 7-year-old boys (Billy Hawes, Jr., John Fitch, Jr., and Dusty Paul, Orgeron's son). Ruth Doty, the principal, was partially deafened in one ear by the blast. Unlike school attacks in the early 21st century, there was no constant national and international media coverage of the Poe attack. No memorial was constructed at Poe Elementary. HISD named two new elementary schools after victims of the attack: Kolter Elementary School in Meyerland and Montgomery Elementary School in Southwest Houston.

Poe was desegregated by 1970.

In 1985 a new classroom wing opened.

From 1986 to 1996, Poe Elementary served a section of River Oaks as the neighborhood program of River Oaks Elementary School had been removed.

Ann McClellan served as principal of Poe beginning circa 1990, and according to the Houston Chronicle, during her tenure Poe "earned its reputation for high TAAS scores and academic standards." She served in that capacity until 2001, when Debbie Verdon became principal on July 23. Verdon previously worked in the Grapevine-Colleyville Independent School District as a principal.

When the 2005–2006 school year concluded, Will Rogers Elementary School closed. Poe Elementary School gained the portion of the Will Rogers zoning boundary that was east of Weslayan.

Jeff Amerson became principal in 2011; he formerly taught at Pershing Middle School and The Rice School, and prior to becoming Poe's principal he was the principal of Garden Oaks Elementary School.

Poe became an International Baccalaureate Primary Years school on February 22, 2016.

== Campus ==
Poe Elementary, which has a light pink, velour brick exterior, copper sheet metal in a natural tone, and a multicolored natural slate roof, uses an American Colonial and Georgian theme. It was the prototype of Architect Harry D. Payne's school design for HISD. Poe's sister schools are River Oaks, Briscoe, Field, Henderson, and Wharton elementaries, which all share the same floor plan. Payne gave each of those schools its own unique exterior.

The school library, previously consisting solely of the area of three classrooms, received an over $80,000 renovation and expansion in 2002. Parents and other area residents contributed $50,000 while the parent-teacher organization (PTO) held fundraisers and other events to generate $40,000. As of 2002 the school library had six IBM compatible computers and four iMacs.

Poe Elementary has a fireplace and chimney given to the school by Ima Hogg. As of 2010 the fireplace is located in the art classroom.

The building is a contributing property of the Boulevard Oaks Historic District on the National Register of Historic Places.

== Curriculum ==
The school has dance, music, Suzuki violin, and visual art classes as part of its magnet program.

== Transportation ==
As of 1985 about 200 Poe students lived north of U.S. Highway 59 and used a bridge on Woodhead Drive to travel to the school, south of the freeway; at least twenty students regularly traveled as pedestrians while about 66% of those north of U.S. 59 were driven in private cars. School bus service was not available since the students lived too close to the school.

== School culture ==
Every year Poe Elementary holds a carnival patronized by members of the Boulevard Oaks community, parents, and future parents. The carnival raises funds to cover budget gaps not supported by HISD or by the State of Texas. The school also holds an annual auction fundraiser.

== School uniforms ==
Poe students (since fall 1998, as of 2006) have to wear school uniforms.

At first, students had a choice of white, red, yellow, or navy blue T-shirts and polo shirts and school T-shirts. Later the school banned all non-Poe logo shirts. As of 2006, all shirts must have the Poe logo.

Students must wear khaki bottoms.

The Texas Education Agency specified that the parents and/or guardians of students zoned to a school with uniforms may apply for a waiver to opt out of the uniform policy so their children do not have to wear the uniform; parents must specify "bona fide" reasons, such as religious reasons or philosophical objections.

== Poe Cooperative Nursery School ==
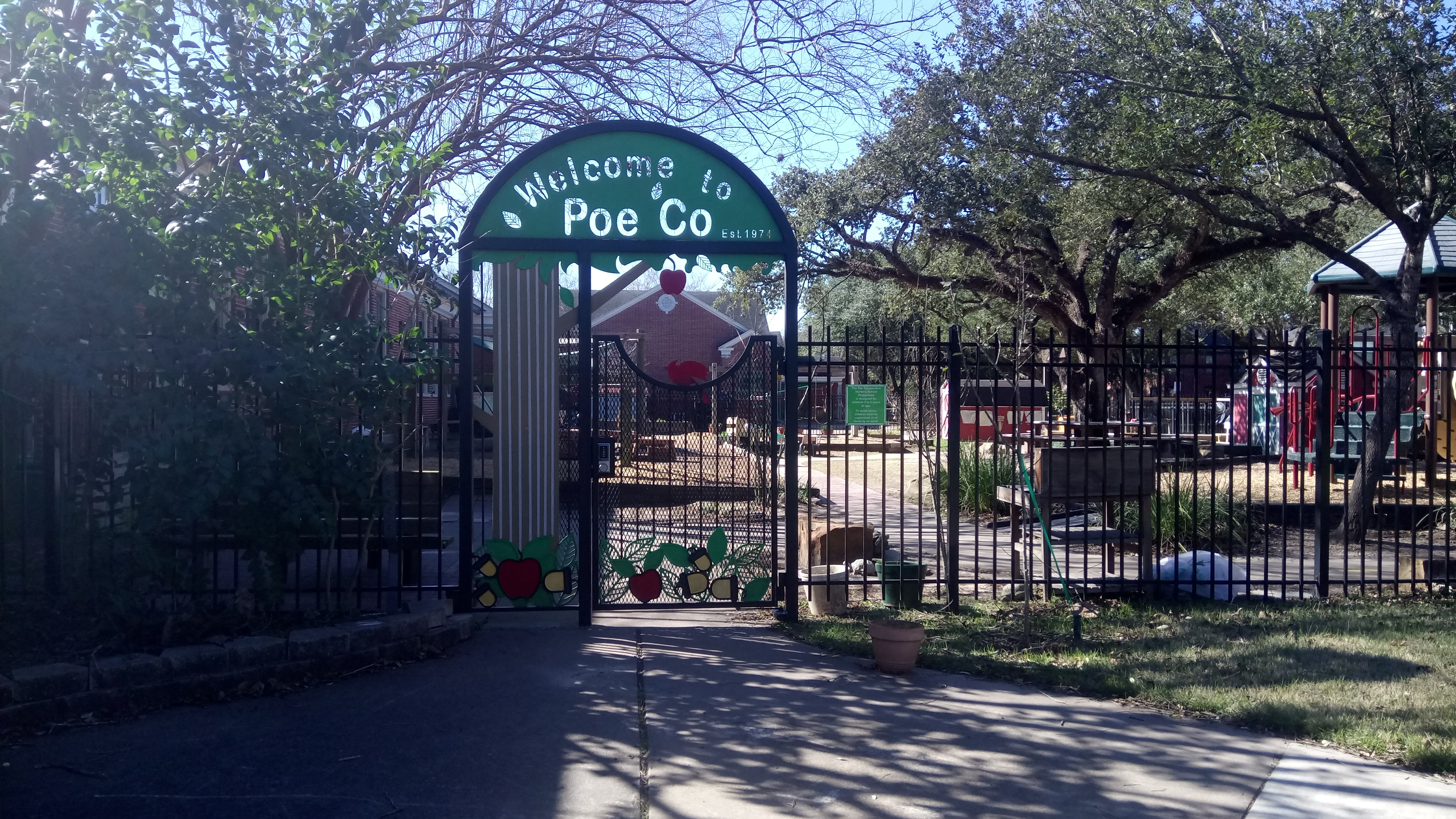
Poe Cooperative Nursery School in 2017, when it was on the campus of Poe Elementary

There is a formerly affiliated private preschool, Poe Cooperative Nursery School (Poe-Co), which historically shared a campus with the public Poe elementary school. It was established after a decline in enrollment at Poe Elementary in the 1970s that occurred due to racial integration. While the parents themselves administered the school and served as assistants in the classrooms, HISD provided the building space and the supporting utility and maintenance services.

Then-HISD superintendent Billy Reagan suggested that a private preschool open on the grounds of Poe Elementary. The preschool opened on February 4, 1974, with two classes of students. The enrollments of these two classes were filled shortly after PoeCo opened. Poe Elementary received an increase in enrollment after PoeCo opened. The preschool was originally held in temporary locations, with some located in the Poe property and some outside of Poe. In 1985 two classrooms in the north wing of the Poe school building were converted into preschool classrooms. The preschool earned National Association for the Education of Young Children (NAEYC) accreditation in 1991, making it the first parent cooperative preschool to do so.

Each parent of an enrolled student must work at the preschool for two days out of every month.

PoeCo holds an annual garage sale to support its operations. PoeCo parents also assist in the wider Poe Elementary carnival by manning booths and/or babysitting for parents who work in the carnival.

In 2020 HISD announced that it will expel private preschools from HISD campuses. HISD was trying to build its own public preschools, and HISD receives funding from the state for public preschool students but not private preschool students. It moved to St. Matthew Lutheran Church effective June 2021.

== Neighborhoods served ==
The school serves multiple neighborhoods and areas: Boulevard Oaks (including Broadacres), Ranch Estates, Southampton, Shadyside, Rice Village, a portion of Neartown (including sections of Montrose, Castle Court, Dearborn Place, Richwood Place, and a portion of Lancaster Place), portions of the Houston Museum District area, a portion of Riverside Terrace, and a portion of Upper Kirby (areas of the district located west of Edloe and north of Westpark, residential areas located east of Edloe, west of Kirby, and north of U.S. Route 59, and residential areas east of Kirby).

In addition, the 2727 Kirby condominium complex, and the Greenway Condominiums (14 Greenway and 15 Greenway), are zoned to Poe Elementary.

A Houston Housing Authority (HHA) public housing complex, the Ewing Apartments, is zoned to Poe.

== Feeder patterns ==
Most residents of the Poe attendance boundary are zoned to Bob Lanier Middle School (formerly Sidney Lanier Middle) in Neartown, while a few are zoned to Cullen Middle School. All residents of the Poe attendance boundary are zoned to Mirabeau B. Lamar High School in Upper Kirby.

== Miscellaneous usage ==
Poe Elementary serves as a polling location during elections. The Houston Press ranked it as the best polling center in Houston in 2003.

== Notes ==
- Some material originated from Boulevard Oaks, Houston
