= Grace Spaulding John =

American painter

- Born: February 10, 1890; Battle Creek, Michigan, United States
- Died: July 22, 1972 (aged 82)
- Education: St. Louis School of Fine Arts; National Academy of Design; School of the Art Institute of Chicago; Pennsylvania Academy of Fine Arts; Art Students League
- Known for: Painting
- Style: Portraiture

Grace Spaulding John (1890 – 1972) was an American painter, author and lecturer born in Battle Creek, Michigan. Her early years were spent in Vermont, and around the age of thirteen she moved with her family to Texas.

She studied at the St. Louis School of Fine Arts, at the National Academy of Design, the School of the Art Institute of Chicago, at Pennsylvania Academy of Fine Arts and at the Art Students League, variously with Charles Webster Hawthorne, Daniel Garber, Fred Weber and with Emil Bisttram in Taos.

“A fine portrait painter, she executed over a hundred and twenty-five portraits, all done from life, among them Thomas Mann, Edgar Lee Masters, and Oveta Culp Hobby dressed in her uniform as first commander of the Women's Army Auxiliary Corps which is now in the National Portrait Gallery in Washington, D.C. During her career, she had twenty-seven one-man shows.”

John is the author of the books “Memo: Verses with Drawings by the Author”, “The Living Line: Drawings and Verses.” (1962), “The Knotless Thread” (1970), “One-Plus One_Plus One (1972) and is the illustrator of “Azalea Commemorating Its Twentieth Annual Azalea Trail Houston” (1955).

Grace Spaulding John's papers can be found at the Woodson Research Center, Fondren Library, Rice University.
