= Boulevard Oaks, Houston =

- Boulevard Oaks Historic District
- U.S. National Register of Historic Places
- U.S. Historic district
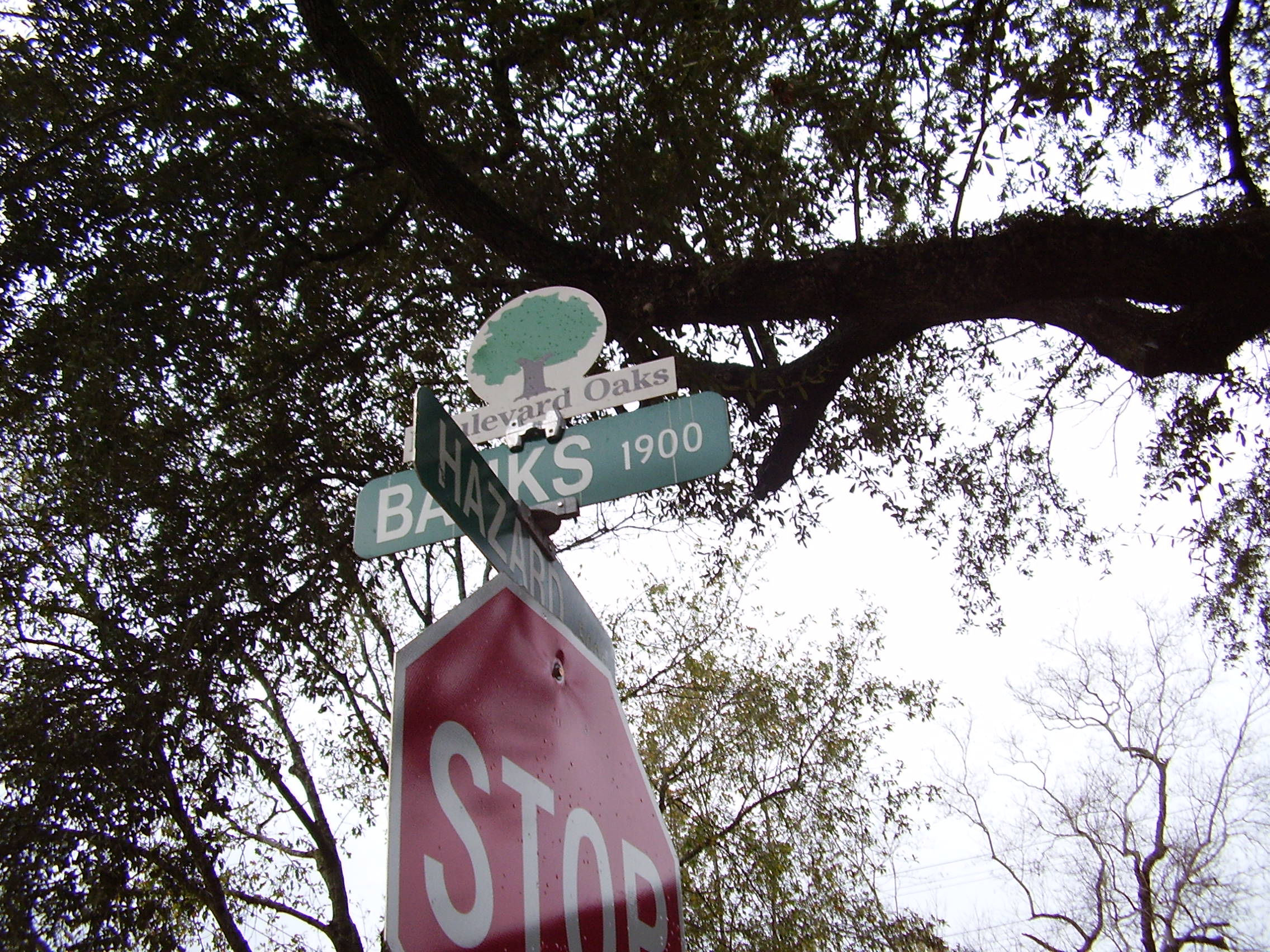
- Boulevard Oaks street sign

- Location within Texas Location within the United States
- Location: Roughly bounded by North and South Boulevards between Parkway and Wilton. Houston, Texas; United States
- Coordinates: 29°43′37″N 95°24′13″W
- Area: 56 acres (23 ha)
- Architect: Watkin, William Ward; et al.
- Architectural style: Late 19th And 20th Century Revivals
- NRHP reference No.: 02000117
- Added to NRHP: February 22, 2002

Boulevard Oaks is a neighborhood in Houston, Texas, United States, containing 21 subdivisions north of Rice University and south of U.S. Highway 59. Developed primarily during the 1920s and 1930s, Boulevard Oaks contains two National Register historic districts, Broadacres and Boulevard Oaks. The Boulevard Oaks Civic Association (BOCA) is the common civic association for all 21 subdivisions.

Boulevard Oaks is in Texas's 7th congressional district.

== History ==
17 communities developed over a period of two decades. In 1980 the Boulevard Oaks Civic Association was created to provide a single management organization for all 17 areas.

The Poe Elementary School bombing occurred in 1959.

The National Register of Historic Places designated the Boulevard Oaks Historic District, located within Boulevard Oaks and roughly bordered by North Boulevard, South Boulevard, Hazard Street, and Mandell Street, as a historical district on February 22, 2002.

== Composition ==
The subdivisions of Boulevard Oaks are Chevy Chase, Edgemont, Ormond Place, Broadacres, Vassar Place, Ranch Estates, North Edgemont, West Edgemont, West Ormond Place, Cresmere Place, Cherokee, Vassar Court, Greenbriar Addition, Keithly Place, Sunset Court, Sunset Place, Sunset Estates, Cheyne Walk, Hermann Hospital Estates, Wroxton Court, and portions of the O. Smith Survey.

The Simon and Mamie Minchen House is within Boulevard Oaks.

== Government and infrastructure ==
Boulevard Oaks is a part of the University Place Super Neighborhood Council.

The community is in Houston City Council District C.

The Houston Police Department's South Central Patrol Division, headquartered at 2022 St. Emanuel., serves the neighborhood.

The Southampton/Boulevard Oaks Patrol Service provides private security to the community and to Southampton.

Harris Health System (formerly Harris County Hospital District) designated Northwest Health Center in northwest Houston for ZIP code 77098, and Martin Luther King Health Center in southeast Houston for ZIP code 77005. The nearest public hospital is Ben Taub General Hospital in the Texas Medical Center.

== Schools ==
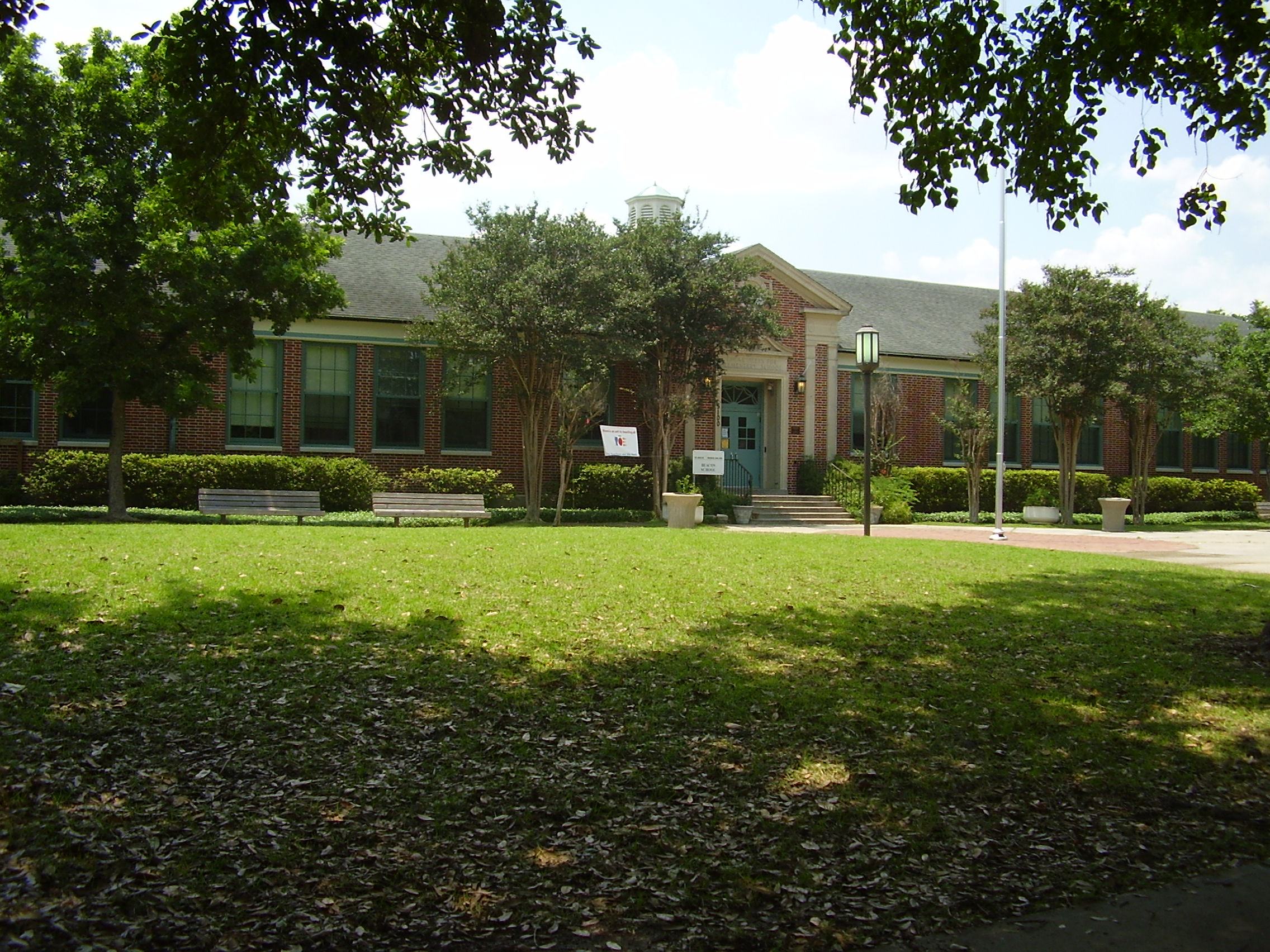
Poe Elementary School

The neighborhood is zoned to Houston Independent School District (HISD) schools. Poe Elementary School is located in the Chevy Chase subdivision in Boulevard Oaks. Zoned schools include Poe Elementary School, Lanier Middle School (in the Montrose neighborhood), and Lamar High School (in the Upper Kirby neighborhood).

Area K-8 private schools include Presbyterian School in Houston. Area 9-12 high schools include St. Agnes Academy and Strake Jesuit College Preparatory in Houston. K-12 private schools include St. John's School in Houston and The Kinkaid School in Piney Point Village.

== Parks and recreation ==
The Vassar Spaceway Park is located in Boulevard Oaks. It was dedicated as a municipal park in the late 1980s. Evalyn Krudy, the director of the University Place Super Neighborhood Council, said that since the creation of the park, it had been affected by drainage issues. The Boulevard Oaks association received $5,000 in matching grant funds from the Matching Grant Program of the City of Houston Planning and Development Department. The funds were used to create a comprehensive drainage and maintenance plan to prevent standing water from accumulating and to beautify the park.

== Neighborhood in film ==
Boulevard Oaks appears in the films Terms of Endearment (1983), Rushmore (1998), Sidekicks (1992), My Best Friend is a Vampire (1988). Ms. Cross' temporary home in Rushmore is on North Boulevard. Mr. Blume and Ms. Cross also take a walk down North Boulevard in the film. In Terms of Endearment, Garrett Breedlove and Aurora take a walk down North Boulevard.

== Media ==
The Houston Chronicle is the area regional newspaper.

The West University Examiner is a local newspaper distributed in the community.

== See also ==
- Southampton Place, Houston
