= Teen center =

Center serving adolescents in a community

A teen center is a community center serving adolescents in a community. It may provide services for at-risk teens, help to meet their health needs, serve to discourage anti-social behavior, and help teens to find employment.

The purposes of a teen center are:

- explore their interests and talents in a self-directed manner;
- access support and mentorship in such vital things as leadership skills, communication skills, well-being, careers advice;
- and, crucially, get support in writing university, scholarship and job applications to secure future success and fulfilment.
