= Wharton Elementary School =

Wharton Elementary School may refer to:

- Wharton Dual Language Academy, formerly known as William Wharton Elementary School, in the Houston Independent School District - Houston
- Thomas Wharton Elementary School - School District of Lancaster - Lancaster, Pennsylvania
- Wharton Elementary School - Wharton Independent School District - Wharton, Texas
