= Westmoreland Historic District =

Westmoreland Historic District may refer to:

- Westmoreland Historic District (Toledo, Ohio), listed on the National Register of Historic Places in Lucas County, Ohio
- Westmoreland Historic District (Houston, Texas), listed on the National Register of Historic Places in Harris County, Texas
