= Gregory-Lincoln Education Center =

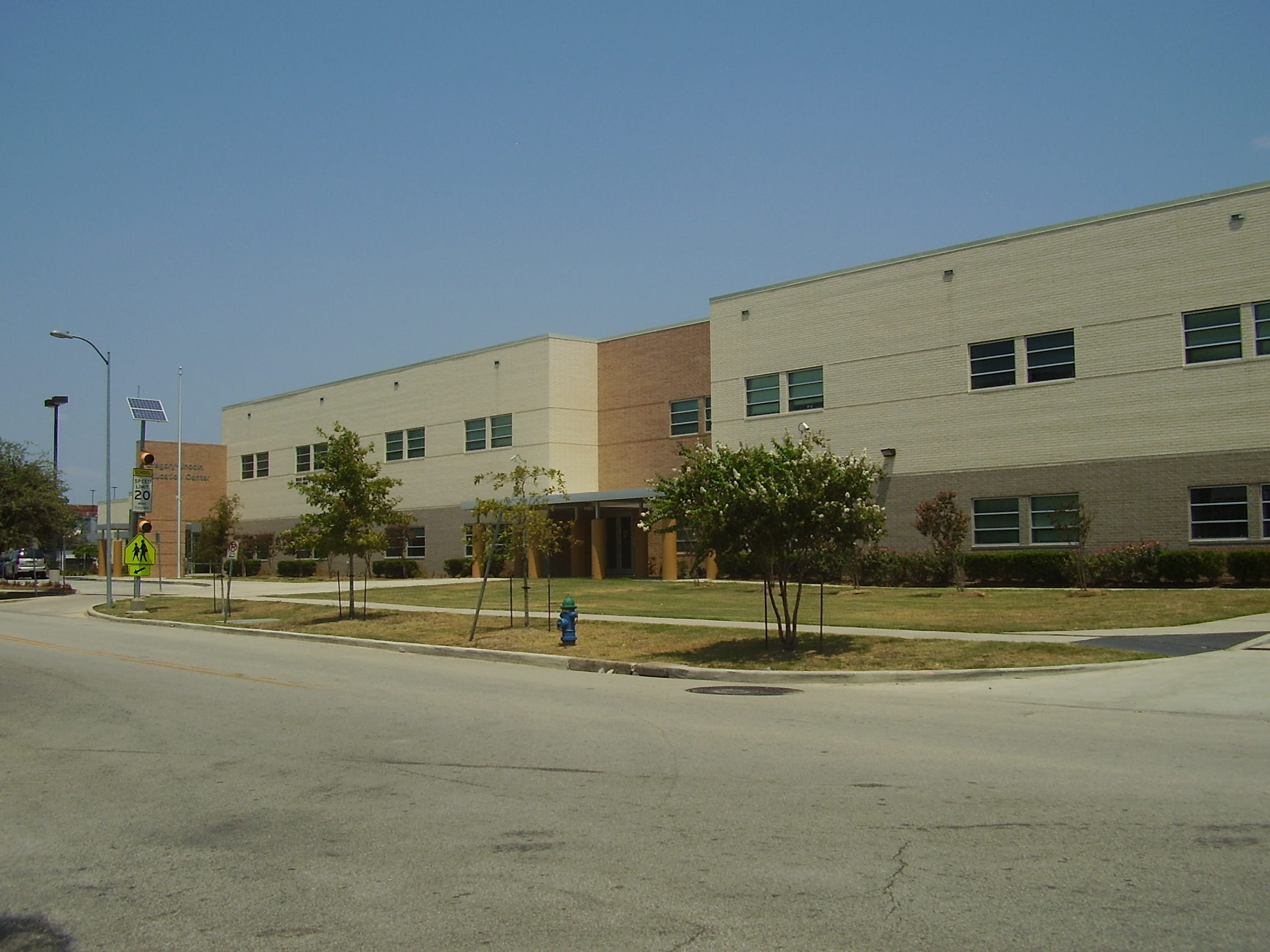

Location
- 1101 Taft Houston, TX 77019; United States; 29.7562492°N 95.385022899°W

Information
- Type: K-8 school
- School district: Houston Independent School District
- Superintendent: .
- Faculty: 46.39 (FTE)
- Grades: K-8
- Enrollment: 726 (2017-18)
- Student to teacher ratio: 15.65
- Communities served: Fourth Ward, Montrose, Midtown, Downtown
- Website: greglincoln.houstonisd.org

Edgar Gregory-Abraham Lincoln Education Center (GLEC) is a K-8 school located at 1101 Taft in the Fourth Ward area of Houston, Texas, United States. Gregory-Lincoln is a part of the Houston Independent School District (HISD) and has a fine arts magnet program that takes students in both the elementary and middle school levels. Originally built in 1966 as Lincoln Junior and Senior High School, it later operated as Lincoln Junior High School until Gregory Elementary School merged into it in 1980, forming Gregory-Lincoln. The school moved into its current building in 2008; the rebuilding was delayed due to concerns that U.S. Civil War-era graveyards would be disturbed by the rebuilding process.

One namesake is Edgar M. Gregory, an officer in the Union army in the U.S. Civil War and the assistant commissioner of the Texas area's Freedmen's Bureau. The other is Abraham Lincoln.

== History ==
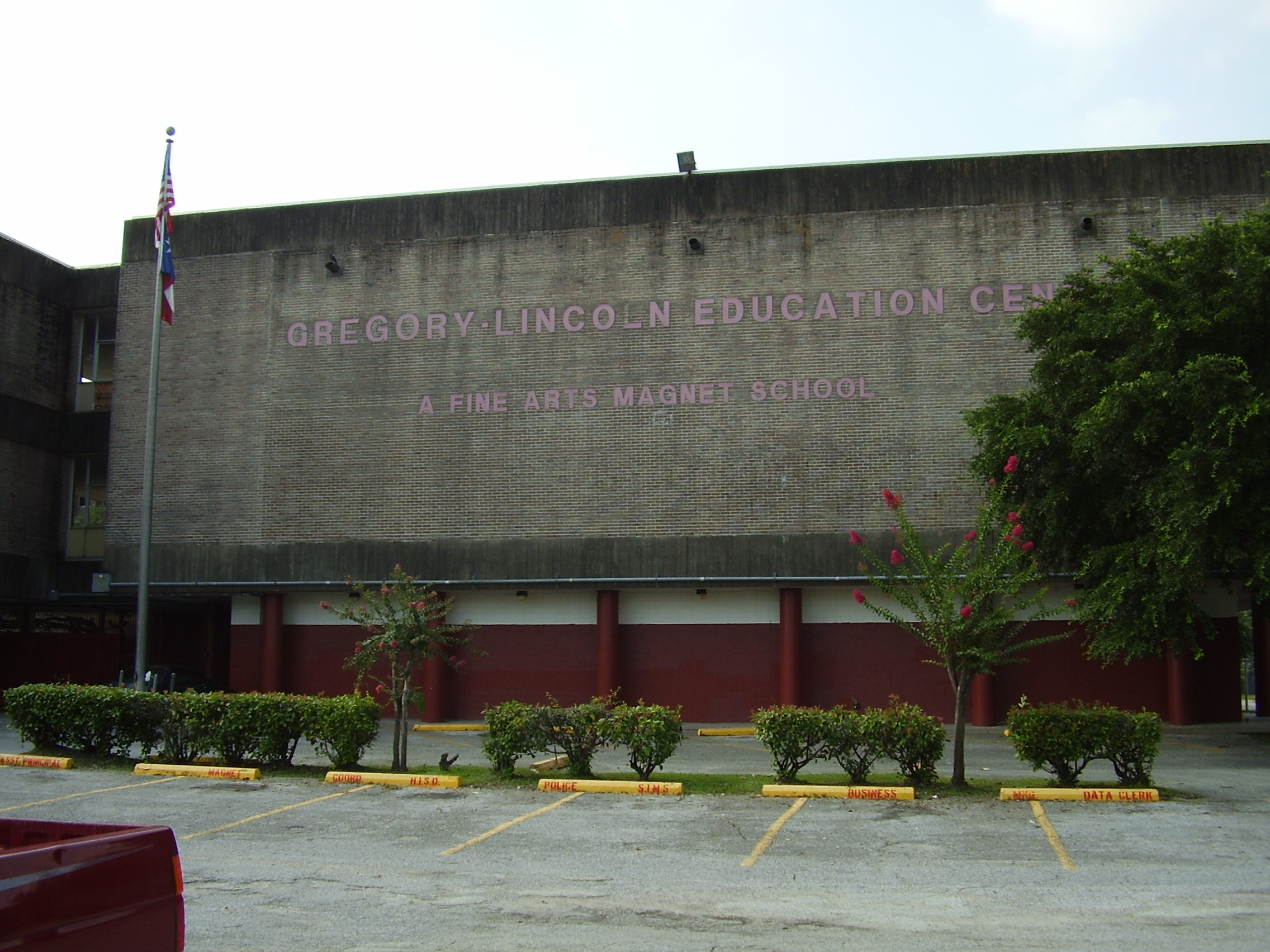
The former Gregory-Lincoln Education Center campus, built in 1966

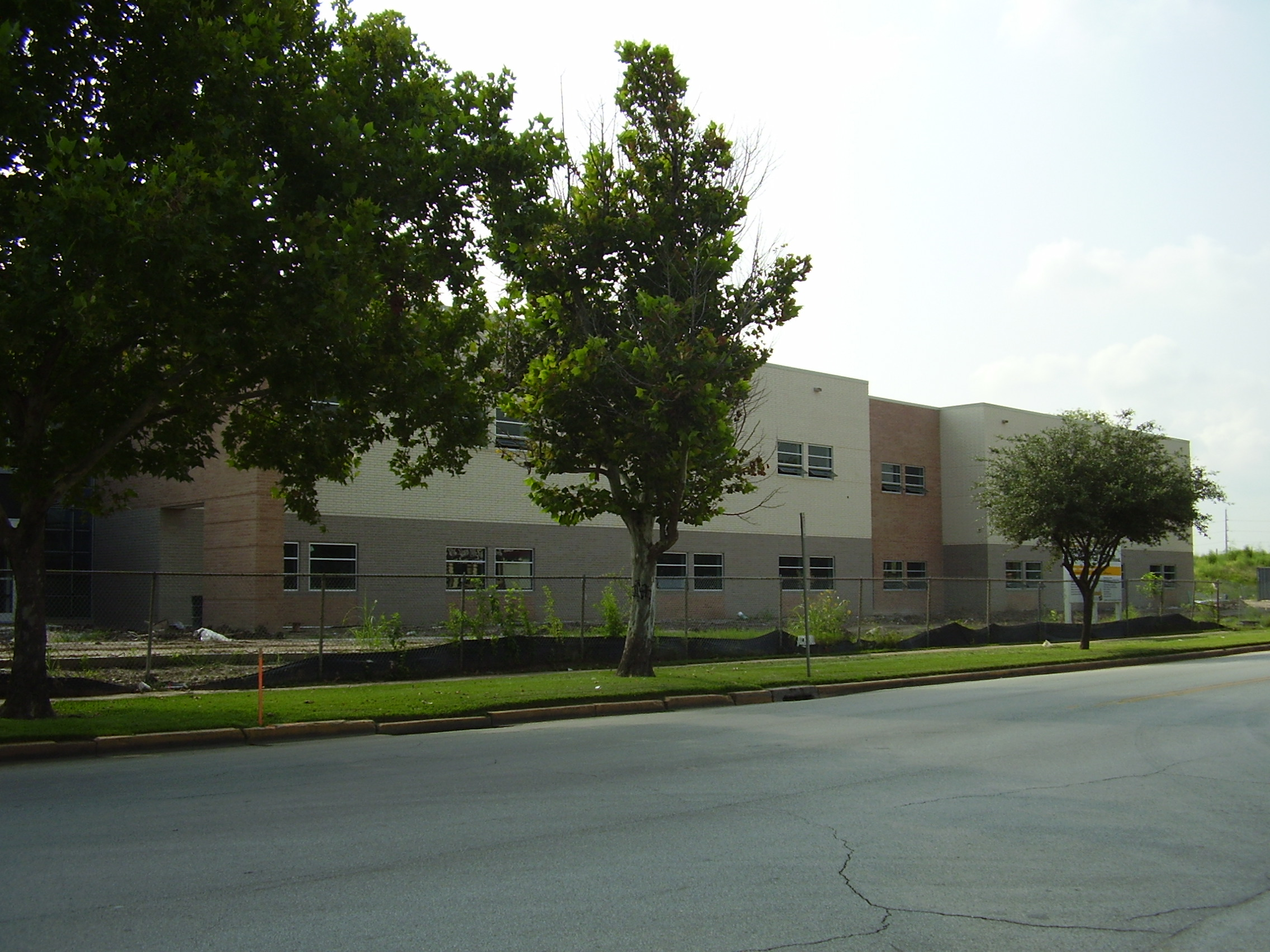
Gregory-Lincoln Education Center under construction

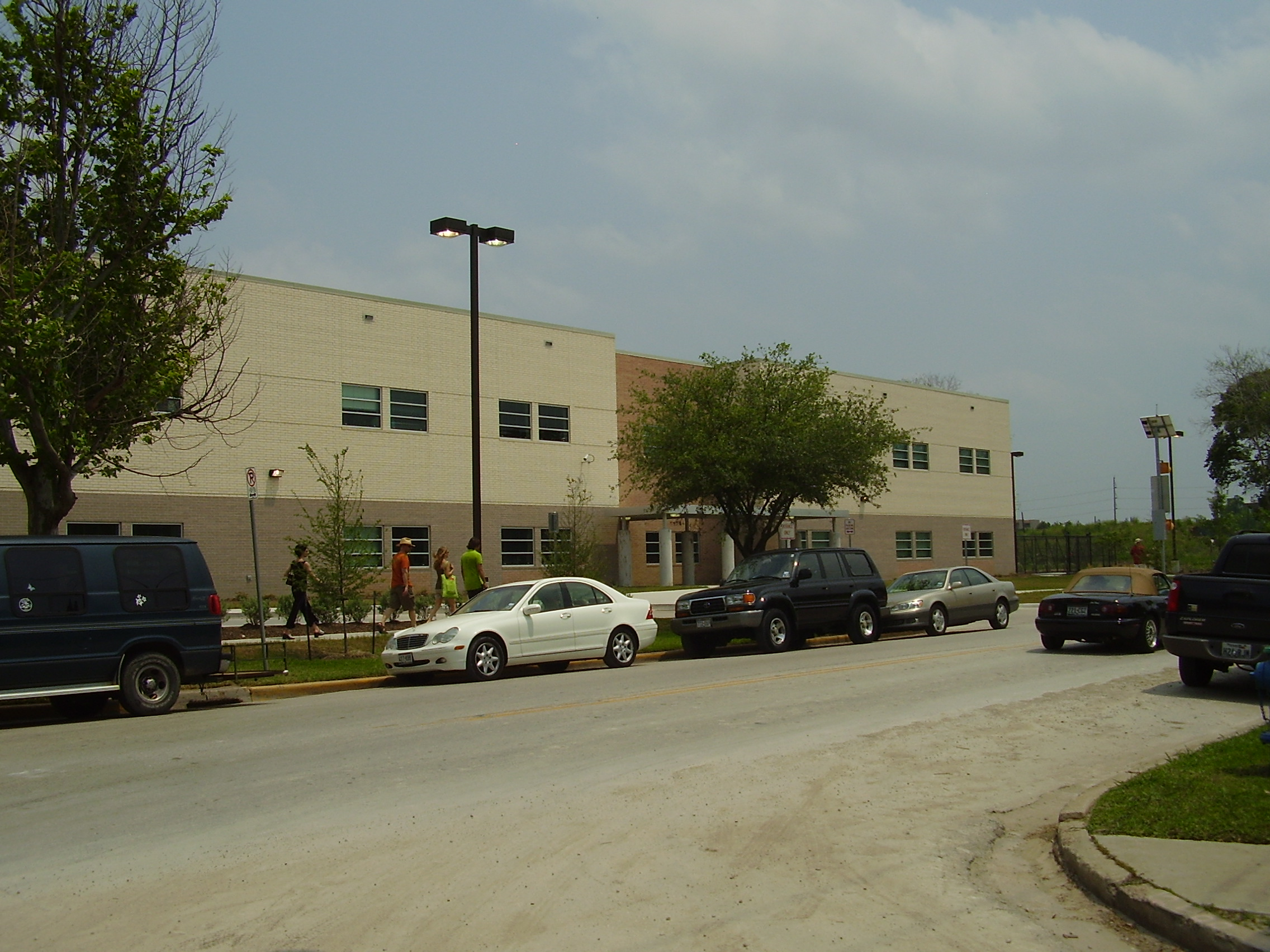
Gregory-Lincoln Education Center after completed construction

The first campus for the Lincoln Junior-Senior School was built in 1966. The original campus was a three-story brick building. It served as a neighborhood secondary school for a section of Montrose. The school opened just as schools were no longer legally segregated by race in the U.S. as the result of the Civil Rights Movement. Thorne Dreyer and Al Reinert of Texas Monthly wrote that HISD officials at the time called it "the most successfully integrated school in the city." However some white families assigned to Lincoln avoided the school by way of private school, moving to another school zone, or renting an apartment in another school zone. A parent-teacher organization was formed despite the disadvantaged backgrounds of some families. Beginning in 1969, a desegregation program, initially funded by parishioners of the First Presbyterian Church and operated by the Emergency School Assistance Programs, a federal government initiative to support schools that racially integrated, began. The church funding paid for the first year.

It was initially both a junior and senior high school, and also became the campus of Houston Community High School, an HISD magnet school. At a later point it was solely Lincoln Junior High School. In 1980 the district closed the Gregory School (now used as the African American Library at the Gregory School) and consolidated its students, including elementary ones, into Lincoln. A document quoted in a U.S. Congressional report stated that area residents perceived the move as trying to destabilize the Fourth Ward and "The closing of Gregory and the shifting of its students to Lincoln was met with intense opposition from Fourth Ward residents."

In 2000, the district announced that the Gregory-Lincoln would receive a new campus that would be on the site of the old campus. Initially HISD planned to locate the a new campus for the High School for the Performing and Visual Arts (HSPVA) on the same site. In 2002 the Texas Historical Commission (THC) told HISD that there were properties eligible to the placed on the National Register of Historic Places (NRHP) in the area which HISD wished to demolish houses for the new Gregory-Lincoln campus: Genesee Street to the north, Taft Street to the West, West Gray Street to the south, and Andrews street to the east. HISD began demolishing houses anyway. The development attracted controversy since it used eminent domain to seize property owned by existing residents, even though some residents expressed a reluctance to have their property seized. Betty L. Martin of the Houston Chronicle said that some of the properties were "reputed to be of historical significance."

A homeowner named Anthony Pizzitola, who was resident in the Braeswood area, unsuccessfully sued HISD to stop the demolition of his house and asked historian Janet Wagner to determine the probability of historic artifacts at Gregory-Lincoln because there were rumors that there was a grave site from the American Reconstruction era. These rumors of prevented any development for several years. In 2006 Houston ISD did not find any new grave sites and started development of Gregory-Lincoln. The new Gregory-Lincoln campus was scheduled to be completed by 2008.

The current $13.5 million, 114,000-square-foot (10,600 m^{2}) school building was financed by the $808.6 million 2002 Rebuild HISD bond. On Monday, December 31, 2007, the two story current Gregory Lincoln building opened. As of January 2008 it has about 500 students. The demolition of the original campus was scheduled to begin in January 2008. The district planned to grade the land and place an athletic field for middle school students and a playground for elementary school students. The new school building includes digital ceiling-mounted projectors in the classrooms.

As a result of the May 2009 closing of J. Will Jones Elementary School, Gregory-Lincoln's elementary boundary had an increase in territory in Midtown.

As the result of the 2011 closing of E.O. Smith Education Center, Gregory-Lincoln's middle school boundary had an increase in territory in Downtown Houston. As part of rezoning for the 2014–2015 school year, all portions of Midtown previously zoned to Blackshear Elementary School and all portions of Downtown previously zoned to Blackshear as well as many portions previously zoned to Bruce Elementary School were rezoned to Gregory-Lincoln for elementary school.

From 2009 to 2019 each Gregory-Lincoln principal had a term of two years or fewer. Jacob Carpenter of the Houston Chronicle used the school as an example of a low income urban school plagued by constant staff turnover, as in addition four tenths of the teachers from each school year are not present in the following one.

== Student body ==
In 1972, there were 1,336 students attending Lincoln Junior-Senior High. Black students made up 63%, Mexican-origin students made up 20%, and 17% were Anglo White.

As of the 1982–1983 school year the school had 836 elementary students, with 382 (45.7%) being black, 181 (33.8%) being Asian, 164 (19.6%) being Hispanic, and eight (0.9%) being white.

In the school's history it received enrollment decreases, particularly when the population decreased, from 906 students in the 2000-2001 period, to about 700 students in the 2004-2005 period. Gentrification of the areas within the elementary and middle school attendance boundaries has caused enrollment to drop.

As of 2008 it had 546 students.

== School uniforms ==
Gregory-Lincoln requires school uniforms.

All students must wear red, grey, or black polo shirts. Students must wear khaki trousers, shorts, or skirts.

The Texas Education Agency specified that the parents and/or guardians of students zoned to a school with uniforms may apply for a waiver to opt out of the uniform policy so their children do not have to wear the uniform; parents must specify "bona fide" reasons, such as religious reasons or philosophical objections.

== Neighborhoods served ==
The elementary attendance boundary includes the Fourth Ward, almost all of Midtown (all of the super neighborhood and the portion of the management district north of U.S. Highway 59), and most of Downtown. Small sections of the Neartown area, including parts of Avondale and East Montrose, are zoned to Gregory-Lincoln Elementary.

The middle school attendance boundary includes: the Fourth Ward, most of Downtown, most of Midtown, and portions of Neartown Houston east of Montrose Boulevard (including Avondale, Courtlandt Place, East Montrose, First Montrose Commons, Roseland Estates, and Westmoreland, and parts of Hyde Park, and North Montrose).

Four Seasons Hotel Houston residences, Houston House Apartments, One Park Place, and Sheridan Apartments are zoned to Gregory-Lincoln for grades K-8. Isabella Court, and The Rice are zoned to Gregory-Lincoln for grades 6-8.

== Feeder patterns ==
All of the areas zoned to Gregory-Lincoln for elementary school continue on to Gregory-Lincoln Middle School.

Elementary schools that feed into Gregory-Lincoln for middle school include:

- Gregory-Lincoln's elementary school program
- Wharton
- Ella J. Baker (former Woodrow Wilson) (partial)
- Crockett (partial)
- MacGregor (partial)

Students within the elementary school attendance zone and students within the middle school attendance zone are zoned to either Northside High School (formerly Davis High School) for the Downtown portion, Lamar High School for the Neartown/Montrose portion and most of Midtown, or Heights High School (formerly Reagan High School) for the Fourth Ward and small portions of Midtown.
