= Sheridan Apartments (Houston) =

Historic building

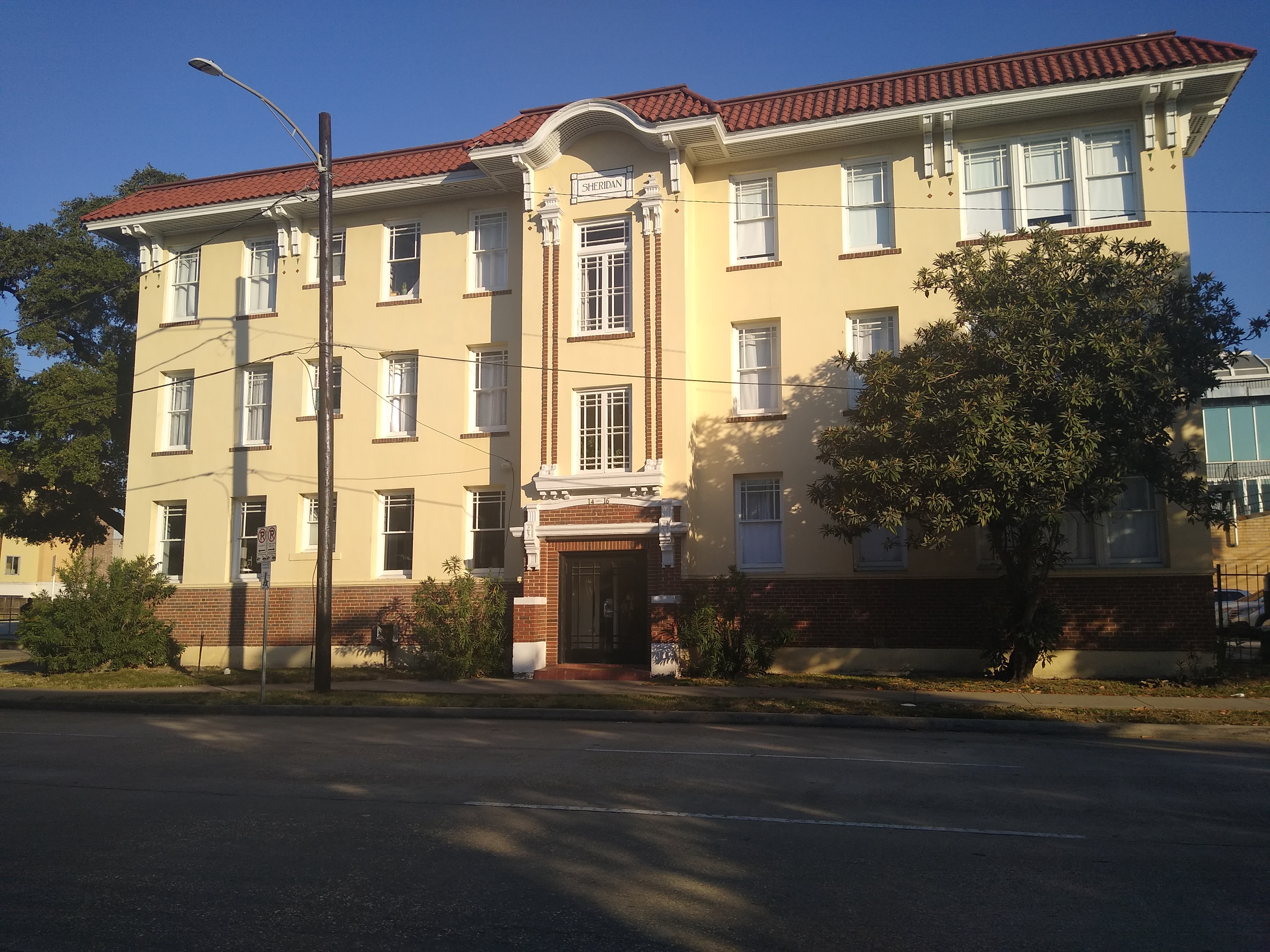
The Sheridan Apartments

The Sheridan Apartments is an apartment complex in Midtown, Houston. It was listed on the National Register of Historic Places (ID# 84001825) on August 2, 1984. It became a Texas Historic Landmark the same year, and in 1998 the City of Houston designated it as a landmark. It has Italianate features, as well as influences from the Arts and Crafts movement and the Prairie School.

1922 was the year of construction, on land owned by Robert C. Duff that he had bought in 1919. At the time there was not enough housing in Houston. By the midpoint of 1923 the units were occupied. The City of Houston stated on its website "The Sheridan is of importance because it has undergone no significant alterations since its erection."

The apartments are within the Houston Independent School District, and are zoned to Gregory-Lincoln Education Center (K-8) and Lamar High School. For elementary school the complex was previously zoned to J. W. Jones Elementary School in Midtown. J. Will Jones closed in 2009, and so Gregory-Lincoln's elementary boundary had an increase in territory in Midtown.
