= Westmoreland, Houston =

Subdivision in Houston, Texas, United States

Coordinates: 29.741°N 95.384°W

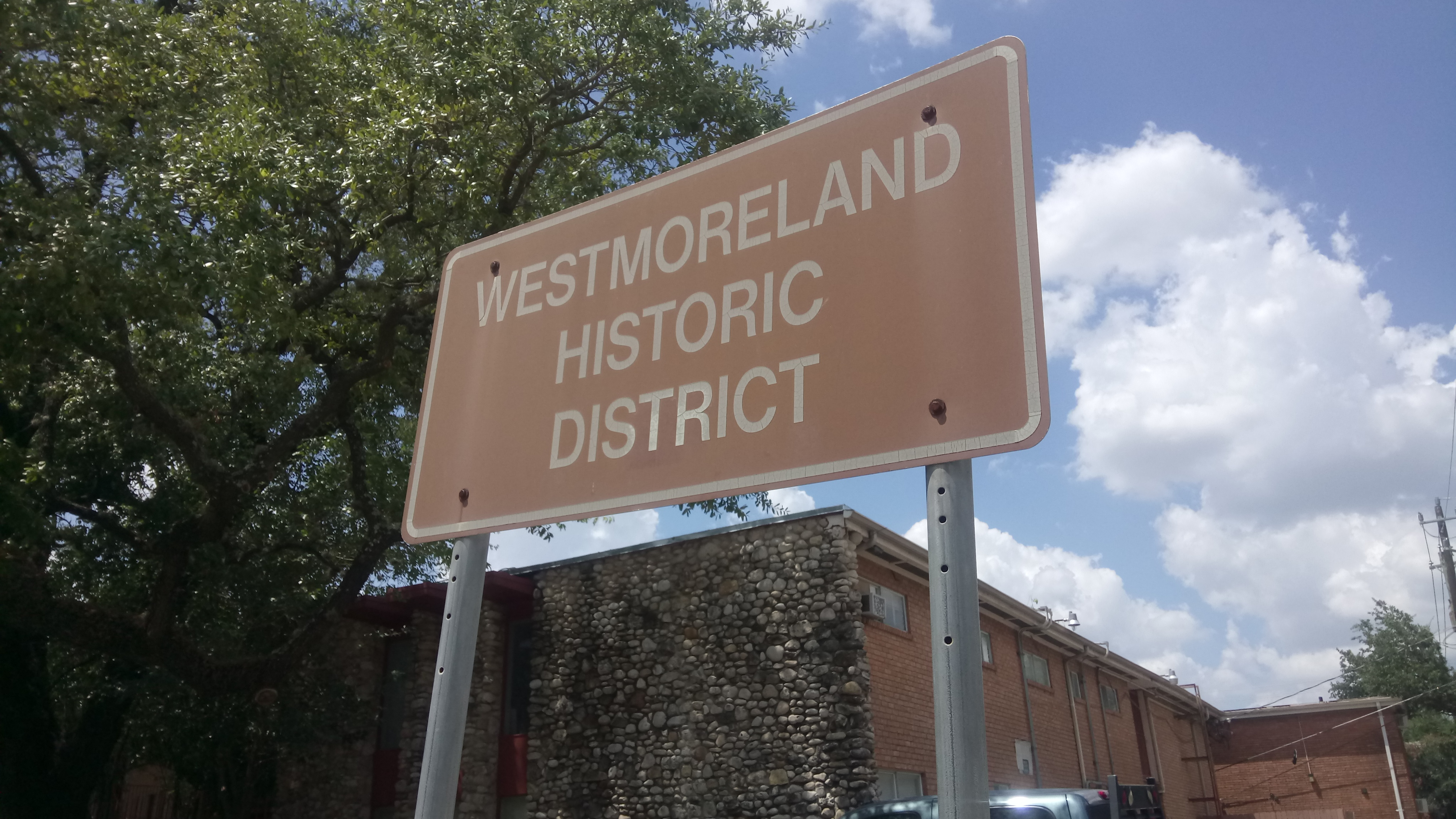
Sign

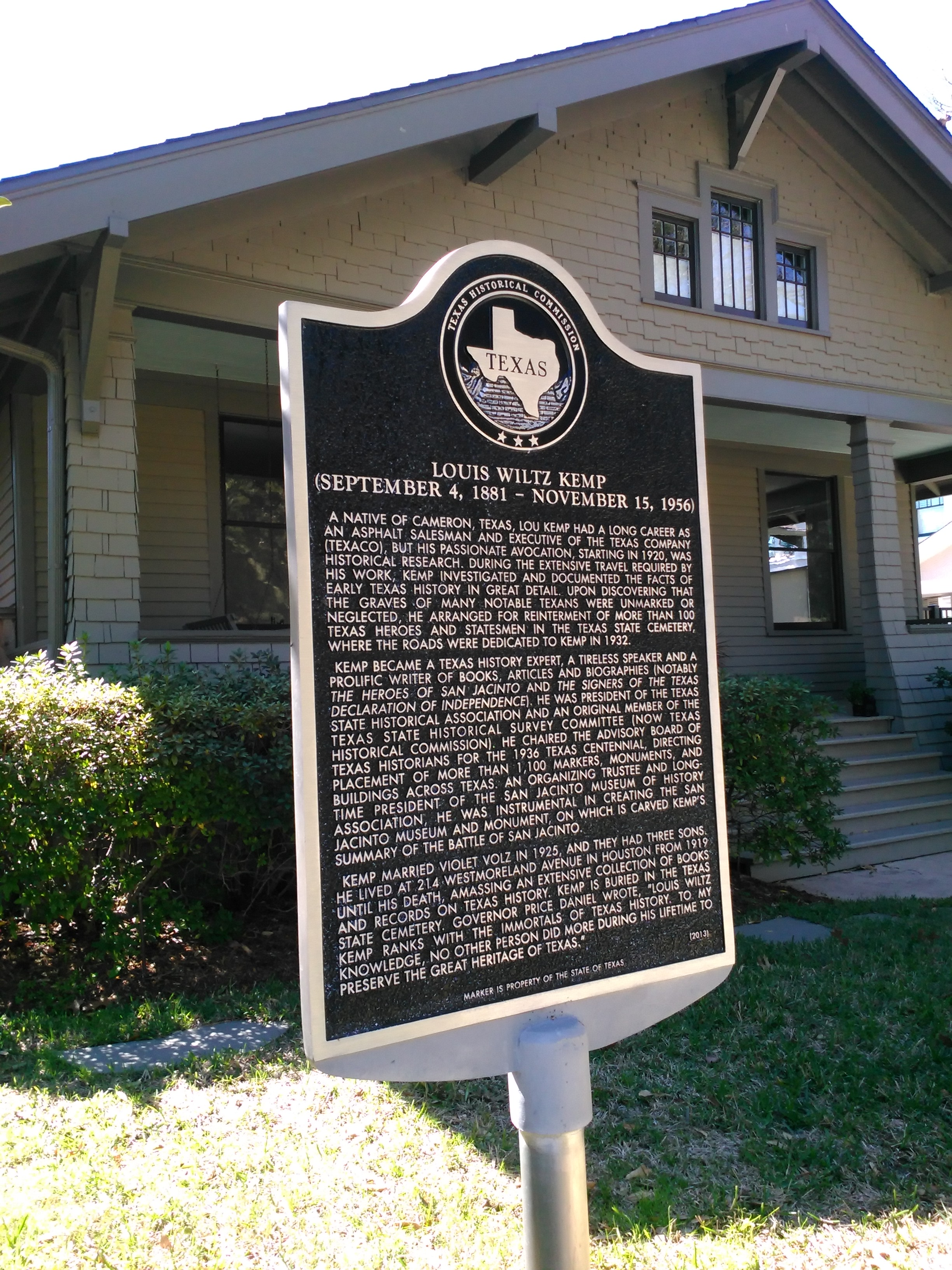
Historical marker

The Westmoreland Historic District is a neighborhood in Neartown Houston, Texas. It is west of Spur 527, between Westheimer Road and West Alabama Street.

The community was created in 1902 and was home to many prominent families in Greater Houston. The historic district's boundaries were established on July 23, 1997. As of 2009 many of the original houses are still standing.

== Notable residents ==
- Governor of Texas James V. Allred - He lived in the James V. Allred House, 400 Emerson

== Government ==
The Harris Health System (formerly Harris County Hospital District) designated the Casa de Amigos Health Center in the Near Northside for the ZIP code 77006. The designated public hospital is Ben Taub General Hospital in the Texas Medical Center.

== Education ==
Residents are zoned to the Houston Independent School District. Residents are zoned to Macgregor Elementary School, Gregory-Lincoln Education Center (for middle school), and Lamar High School.
