= Hyde Park, Montrose, Houston =

Hyde Park
- Neighborhood
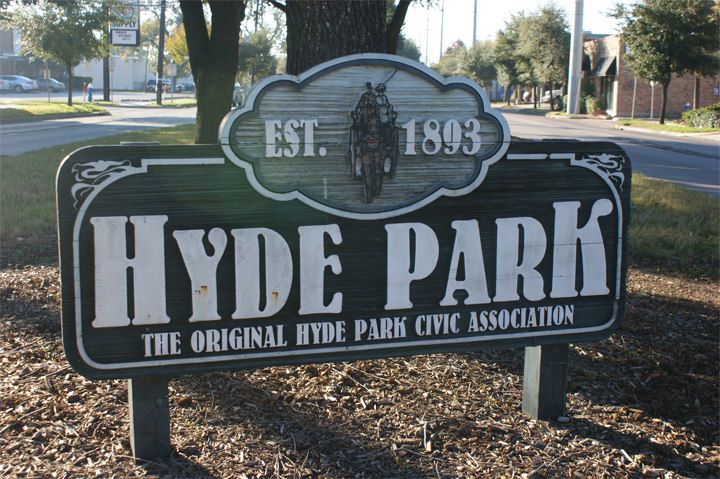
- Hyde Park sign
- Interactive map of Hyde Park
- Coordinates: 29°44′50″N 95°23′41″W
- Country: United States
- State: Texas
- City: Houston
- Established: 1893

Hyde Park is a historic community located in the Montrose neighborhood of Houston, Texas. Its southeast boundary is the intersection Montrose Boulevard and Westheimer. The neighborhood was established in the late 1800s on the summer farm of the second President of the Republic of Texas, Mirabeau Lamar. In the 1970s, Hyde Park became a central part of the Gay Rights Movement in Houston. Like much of Montrose, the neighborhood is now experiencing significant gentrification, and is home to an abundance of restaurants, including Mexican, Italian, Greek, American, Lebanese, coffee houses, and numerous bars.

== Geography ==
Hyde Park is bounded by West Gray to the north, Montrose Boulevard to the east, Westheimer to the south, and Commonwealth and Yupon to the west. The neighborhood is part of the Neartown/Montrose Super Neighborhood. Other Neartown neighborhoods include Cherryhurst, Courtlandt Place, Montrose, Vermont Commons, Mandell Place and Winlow Place.

When Hyde Park was established, it was considered a distant suburb on the outskirts of the City of Houston. Located less than three miles from downtown and inside Loop 610, today it is considered part of central Houston.

== History ==
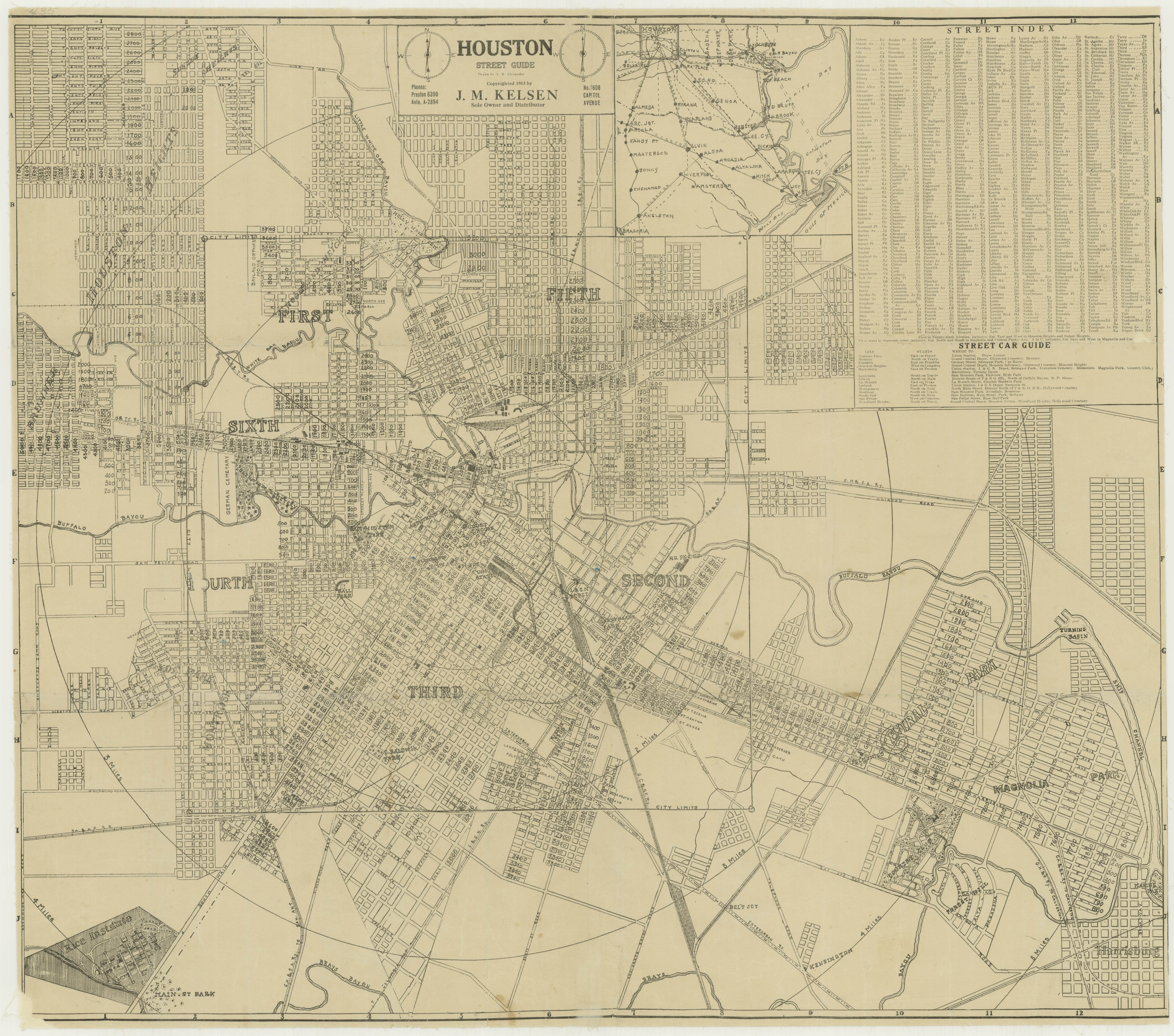
Hyde Park, located at G2, shown on 1913 Map of Houston Wards

Hyde Park was established in 1893 and was developed on land that was owned in the 1840s by Mirabeau B. Lamar, the second President of the Republic of Texas. When the area was annexed into the City of Houston in the early 1900s, it was owned by the Hyde Park Improvement Company, and the company's secretary and treasurer, J.C. Hooper, directed the planning and improvement of the neighborhood. In addition to an abundance of oak trees, the area was also desirable because it was of the highest elevations in the city, sitting 12 feet above downtown, and had excellent drainage to Buffalo Bayou .

According to "The Key to the City of Houston" Hyde Park was intended to be a high-end neighborhood, but deed restrictions regulated improvement prices to ensure that the area remained attainable to more than only the wealthiest citizens. Additionally, the restrictions set a minimum lot size, limited business development, and regulated the placement of barns and outhouses.

The longest continually operating water feature in Houston, the Dolphin Fountain, is located in Hyde Park. The fountain was installed in Lamar Park, a small neighborhood park, in 1946 and still runs today. Hyde Park residents are currently undergoing efforts to restore the fountain.

The neighborhood also hosted the Hyde Park Art Crawl for many years until the mid-2000s. The art crawl showcased the works of artists living in Hyde Park at a variety of locations within the neighborhood, including studios, homes, and restaurants.

The Hyde Park community was also an integral part of the Westheimer Street Festival, which ran along Westheimer Road, the southern boundary of Hyde Park, from 1971 to 2004.

== LGBT community ==
Hyde Park has been an integral part of the Montrose LGBT community since the beginning of the LGBT movement in Houston. The Houston Pride Parade walked along the neighborhood from 1979 until the parade's location change to downtown Houston in 2015.

The historical LGBT bar, Mary's, stood in Hyde Park for nearly 40 years. OutSmart stated that the bar "anchored" Houston’s gay community in the Montrose area. Another popular bar in the LGBT community, Chances, was located in the neighborhood until it closed in 2010.

Hyde Park is also home to Grace Lutheran Church, which became one of the first major churches in Houston to openly accept LGBT members in 1995. It also hired an LGBT pastor in 2008.

Early in her career, Annise Parker, the first openly gay mayor of the City of Houston, resided in Hyde Park.

== Development ==
Like most of the Montrose community, Hyde Park has also seen increased demolition of homes, businesses, and churches as developers demolish entire blocks in an effort to gentrify the area with large town home and mid-rise developments. Many older and larger trees are often removed for this development. Some Montrose community advocates feel the area is at risk of losing some of these distinguishing and cherished characteristics through wholesale demolition and rebuilding.

=== Building protections ===
Beginning in the early 1990s, many subdivisions in Hyde Park opted to renew historical deed restrictions as allowed by the Texas Property Code in an effort to maintain the unique character of the community. Many residents voluntarily opted their properties into the restrictions, which regulate land use, including the subdivision of lots, minimum building setbacks, and tree protections.

Starting in the early 2000s, residents throughout Hyde Park petitioned for the implementation of Chapter 42 Minimum Lot Size (MLS) and Minimum Building Line (MBL) Ordinances. These City of Houston states that protections are intended to help neighborhoods maintain their character. Through 2014, the community has been successful at implementing these protections on many streets within Hyde Park, such as Bomar, Fairview, Hyde Park, Jackson, Michigan, Welch, West Drew, and Willard.

== Government and infrastructure ==
The Harris Health System (formerly Harris County Hospital District) designated the Casa de Amigos Health Center in the Near Northside for the ZIP code 77006. The designated public hospital is Ben Taub General Hospital in the Texas Medical Center.

=== Emergency services ===
There is a Houston Police Department storefront at 802 Westheimer. The community shares Police and Fire Department resources with other Neartown neighborhoods.

=== Representatives ===
As of February 2015, Hyde Park was represented by:

- Houston City Council, District C—Council Member Ellen Cohen
- Texas State House District 147—Representative Garnet Coleman
- Texas State Senate District 15—Senator John Whitmire
- Texas U.S. House of Representatives Congressional District 2--Congressman Dan Crenshaw
- Texas U.S. Senators—Senator John Cornyn and Senator Ted Cruz

== Education ==
Residents are zoned to the Houston Independent School District (HISD). Residents east of Waugh are zoned to Wharton K-8 School (for elementary school), and Gregory-Lincoln Education Center (middle school only). Those west of Waugh are zoned to Baker Montessori School (formerly Woodrow Wilson, for elementary school), and Lanier Middle School. All residents are zoned to Lamar High School.

All students at Baker K-8 must participate in the Montessori program. In the event that a parent zoned to Baker is not interested in having his or her child educated in the Montessori style, the administration of Baker K-8 will assist the parent in selecting a different school.

== Points of Interest ==
Parks & Recreation

- Lamar Park & Dolphin Fountain

Churches & Charities

- Grace Lutheran Church
- Assistance League of Houston

Farmer's Markets & Co-ops

- Central City Co-op

Events

- National Night Out
- Houston Pride Parade

Health Care

- Legacy Community Health Services
