= Baker Montessori School =

School in Houston

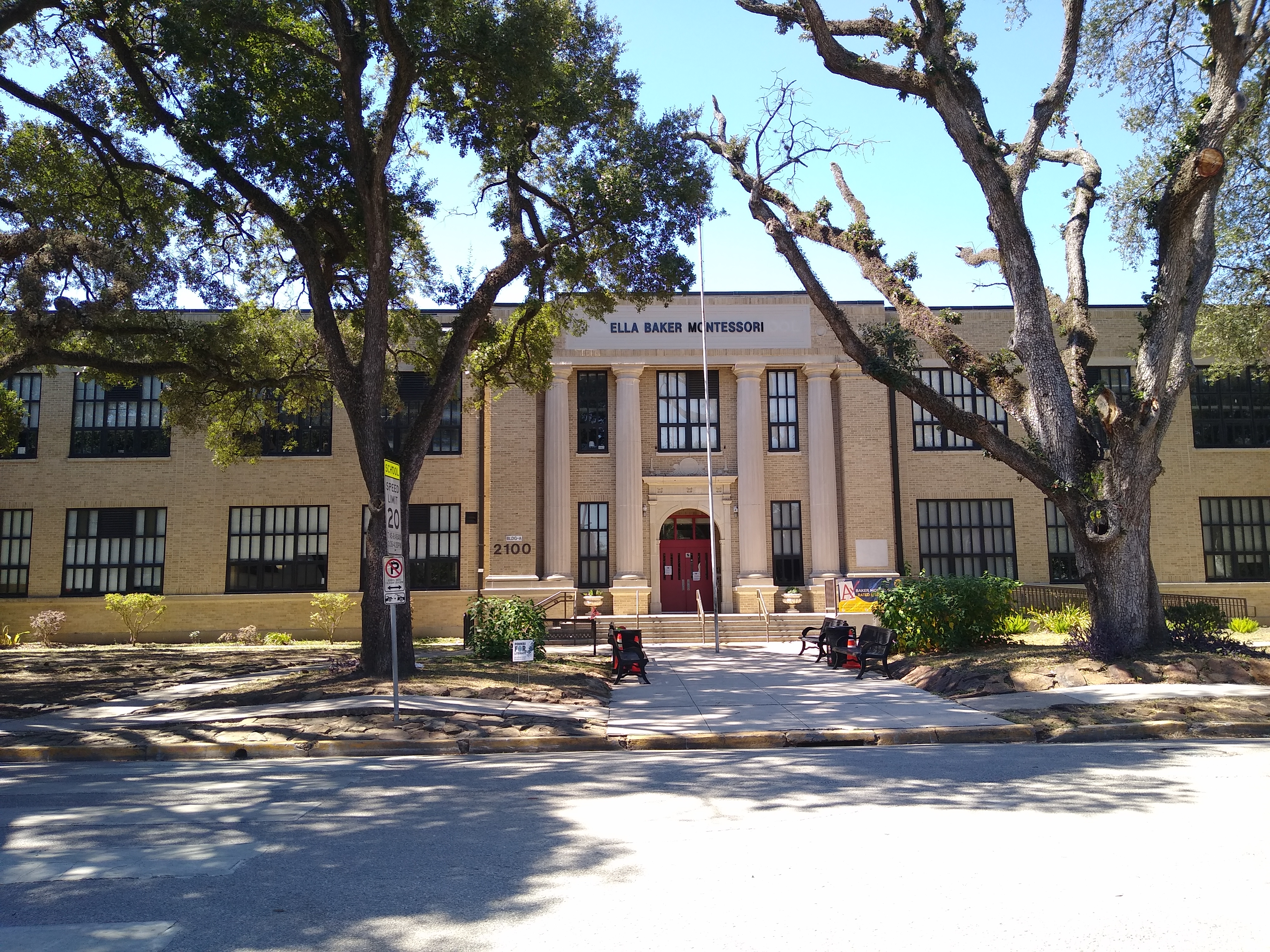
- Baker Montessori School

Location
- 2100 Yupon Houston, TX 77006-1830; Neartown area of Houston, Texas; United States; 29°44′52″N 95°23′56″W

Information
- Other name: Ella J. Baker Montessori School
- Former names: Woodrow Wilson Montessori School; Woodrow Wilson Elementary School
- Type: Public elementary (1925–2005); Public Montessori elementary and middle (since 2005)
- Established: 1925; 101 years ago
- School district: Houston Independent School District
- Grades: K-8
- Enrollment: c. 600 (as of 2021)
- Website: baker.houstonisd.org

The Ella J. Baker Montessori School, formerly the Woodrow Wilson Montessori School and the Woodrow Wilson Elementary School, is a public K-8 Montessori school in the Cherryhurst Addition subdivision in the Neartown area of Houston, Texas. A part of the Houston Independent School District (HISD), Baker serves as the neighborhood elementary school for a section of Neartown, including a portion of Montrose. It also serves as a magnet school for all of HISD's territory. As of 2014 it is one of three public Montessori programs in Houston. It was the first HISD school to use the Montessori style for all students, as well as housing HISD's first Montessori middle school program.

== History ==
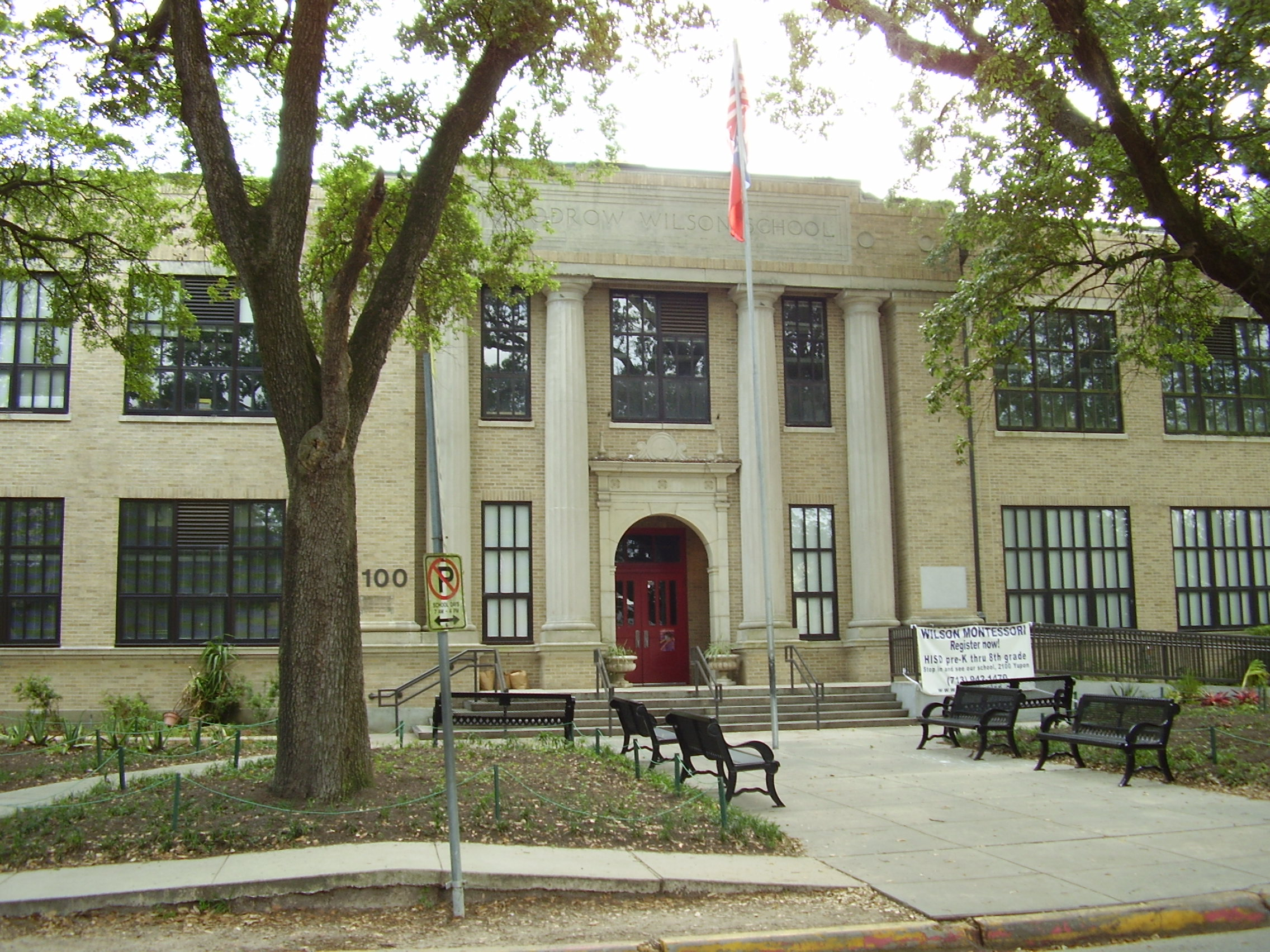
The school under its former name

The land that currently houses Baker Montessori was previously occupied by the summer house of Mirabeau Lamar, a President of Texas; it was located on the Oak Grove acreage site. The acreage was broken up in 1923. Construction began in 1924 and the school opened in 1925.

For much of its history it was a standard neighborhood elementary school. The Houston Chronicle described Wilson Elementary as "the showplace school of the city for many years". From 1986 to 1996, Wilson Elementary served a section of River Oaks as the neighborhood program of River Oaks Elementary School was removed.

In the 2000s Wilson Elementary experienced a decline in enrollment since the surrounding neighborhood had fewer families with children attending school. In 2005 there were 410 students. A group of area parents suggested converting Wilson into a Montessori school. HISD and the group, All Montessori School Project, negotiated for two years to determine how the school would be established. Not all area parents agreed with the proposal; 208 parents had signed a survey stating opposition.

In 2005 HISD announced that Wilson would be converted into a PreK-8 school using a Montessori program for all students. The Friends of Montessori agreed to assist the effort and signed a two-year agreement to assist the conversion of Wilson; and raised $6,000 to buy the materials used for the Montessori program. All teachers were to be certified by Montessori, and existing teachers staying at Wilson were retrained to deliver the curriculum. Parents acquired an additional $345,000 in the period 2003-2008 to convert Wilson into a Montessori campus. The 7th and 8th grades were to be established at Wilson by late 2009.

In 2008 there were 440 students. That year, The Houston Chronicle wrote that "Parents rave about Wilson". After the Montessori program was established, enrollment at Wilson increased; in the 2013-2014 school year, the school had 501 students, including 90 middle school students. The expected enrollment for the 2014-2015 school year was 530.

In 2016 groundbreaking occurred for an expansion of the campus. The original building is to be renovated, and a three-story structure designed by Smith & Co. Architects will be added on. The total cost will be $18.9 million, and the campus will have a total area of almost 58,000 square feet (5,400 m^{2}) of space.

In March 2021 the HISD board announced plans to consider renaming the school due to racist actions of Woodrow Wilson. Civil rights activist Ella J. Baker was proposed as the new namesake. On April 8 the HISD board approved of the rename.

== Admissions and neighborhoods served ==
Baker Montessori School serves as the neighborhood elementary school for a section of Neartown, including the Cherryhurst main and addition subdivisions, a portion of the original Montrose subdivision, a portion of Hyde Park, Mandell Place, Park, Vermont Commons, WAMM, and Winlow Place, as well as most of Audubon Place and portions of Avondale, Lancaster Place, and North Montrose. The Driscoll at River Oaks and the Residences at La Colombe d'Or are zoned to Baker.

In the event that a parent zoned to Baker is not interested in having their child educated in the Montessori style, the administration of Baker Montessori will assist the parent in selecting a different school. Baker Montessori functions as a magnet school, and children from outside the Baker boundary who apply to Baker are selected on the basis of a lottery.

=== Feeder patterns ===
Most residents of the Baker zone are also zoned to Lanier Middle School. Those east of Montrose Boulevard are instead zoned to the Gregory-Lincoln Educational Center middle school program. All residents of the Baker attendance zone are also zoned to Lamar High School.

=== Student body ===
Year	Enrollments	Notes
2005	410	
2008	440	including almost 90 learning English as a second language.
2013-2014	501	
2021	600	

== Curriculum ==
All students at Baker are taught in the Montessori educational style. The school day is divided into three-hour blocks, and students are expected to perform tasks on their own within those three hour blocks. Assignments involve students working in pairs and using flashcards, blocks, beads, and other objects. The school provides Spanish-language Montessori materials, in addition to English-language ones, for students with English as a second language. Each class has a mixture of different ages, and as a result each teacher is required to study, for a period of one year, how to customize a lesson plan for different students. In order to increase relations between the teachers, students and parents, each student stays in the same class for a three-year period. Students are required to take state achievement tests.

Before Baker was converted into an all-Montessori school, its magnet program was known as the "Woodrow Wilson Multi-Cultural Arts Program".

== Campus ==
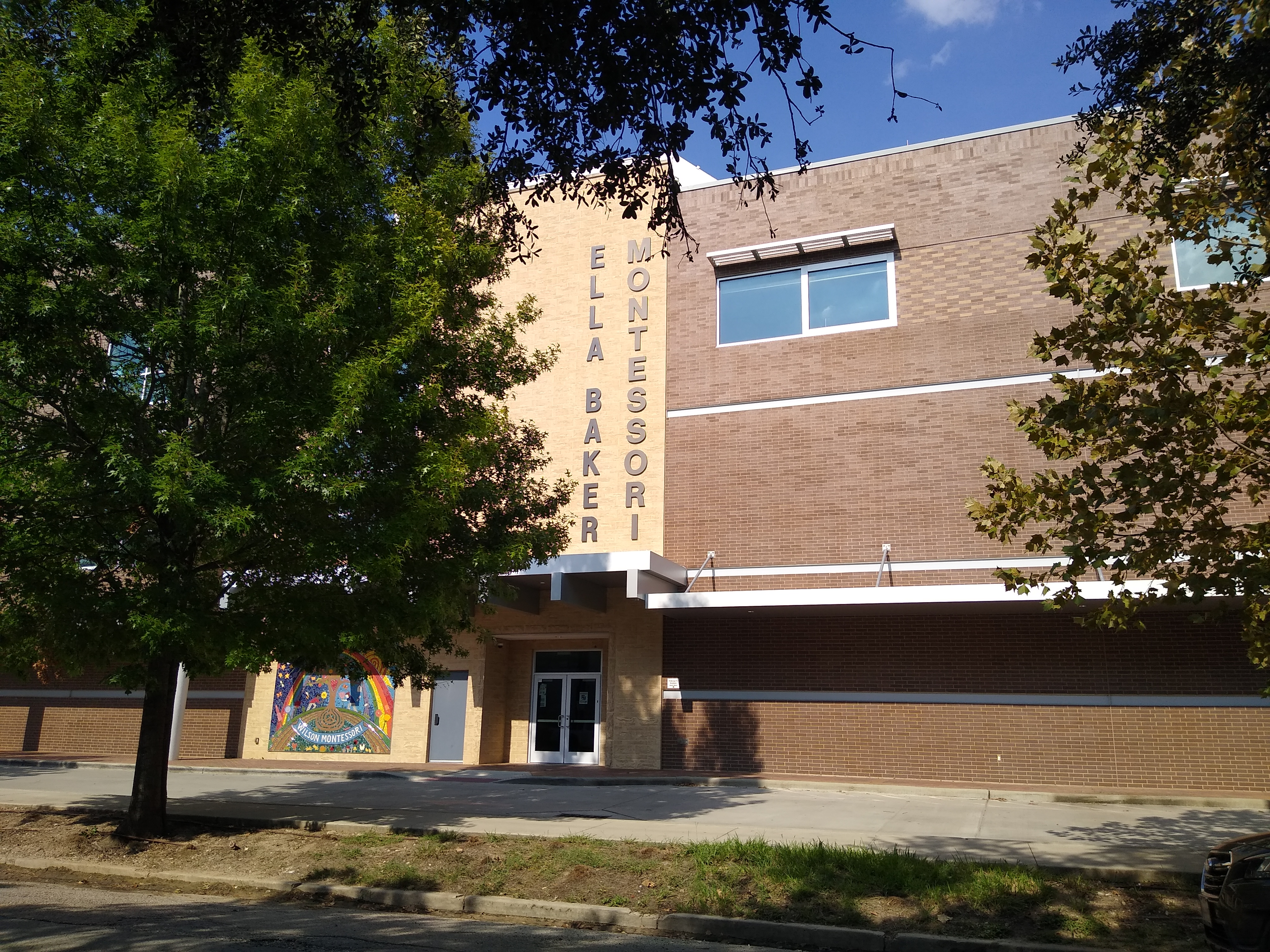
The expansion of the school

The school property is located in the Cherryhurst Addition subdivision. It was built on Block 5.

The school park is known as the Wilson Wonderground SPARK Park; the SPARK Park program is a joint City of Houston-HISD program to allow school parks to be used by the wider community. Around 2002 the Wilson Elementary park was developed as a SPARK Park. The condition of the field declined prior to 2012, but Camilo Parra, a parent of a Wilson student, led a campaign to revitalize the field; the proposal to improve the field was incorporated into existing plans to improve the park. Scott McCready, a landscape architect for SWA, designed the park renovation; McCready was also a parent of a Wilson student.

== Notable alumni ==
- Walter Cronkite
- Mark White, a former Governor of Texas
