= Neartown Houston =

District in Houston, Texas, a.k.a., Montrose

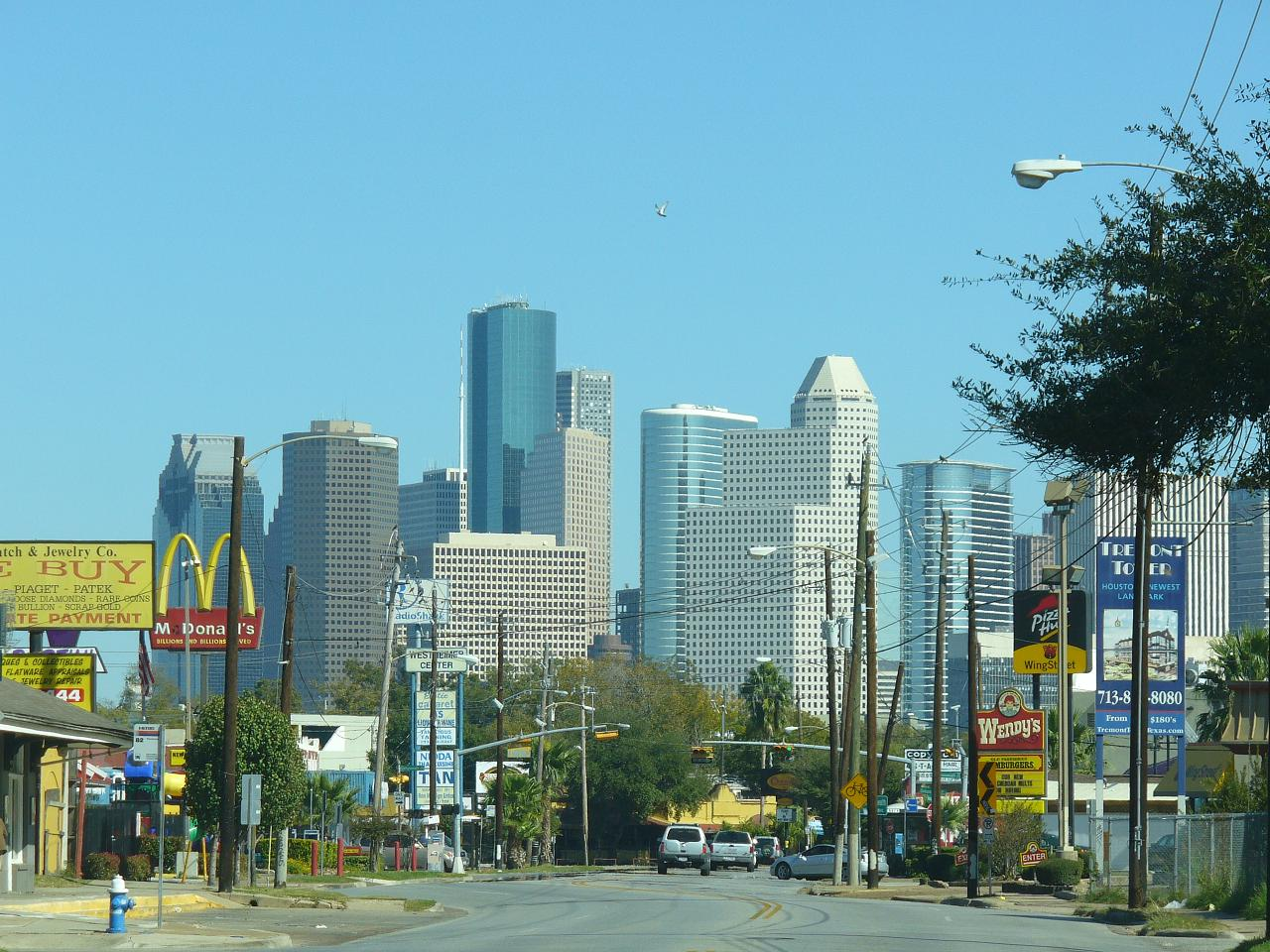
The downtown Houston skyline, viewed from Montrose

Montrose is an area located in west-central Houston, Texas, United States and is one of the city's major cultural areas. Montrose is a 7.5 square miles (19 km^{2}) area roughly bounded by Interstate 69/U.S. Highway 59 to the south, Allen Parkway to the north, South Shepherd Drive to the west, and Taft to Fairview to Bagby to Highway 59 to Main to the east. Montrose neighborhoods include Cherryhurst, Courtlandt Place, Hyde Park, Montrose, Vermont Commons, North and East Montrose, Mandell Place and Winlow Place. Montrose is also less well known by the moniker Neartown, encompassing Superneighborhood #24.

== History ==
Neartown has many of Houston's oldest neighborhoods. The Neartown Association began in 1963. Houston's urban real estate boom starting in the 1990s transformed Neartown and significantly increased property values.

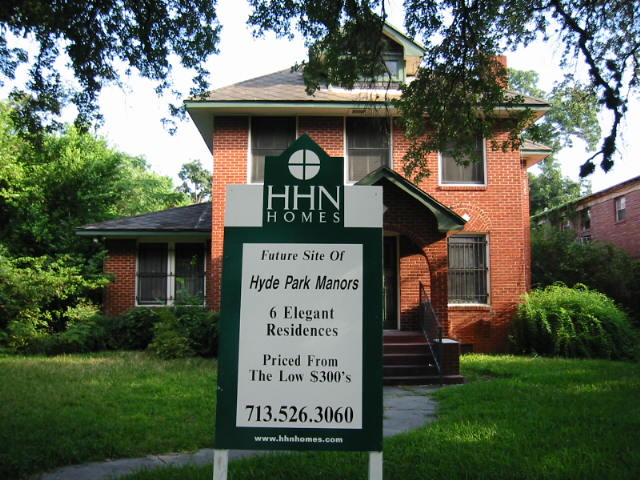
Residential property in Neartown

The City of Houston's Planning Department refers to Neartown as a mixed-use community. Since the 1990s gentrification, musicians and artists are being replaced with higher paid professionals (attorneys, educators, medical professionals) due to higher rents. Montrose has "wound a tortuous course from Silk Stocking and Low Rent and back again." In 1997 Katherine Feser of the Houston Chronicle stated that "Montrose [is] not for starving artists anymore".

On June 6, 2006, a teenage MS-13 gang member named Gabriel Granillo was stabbed to death at Ervan Chew Park.

== Culture ==
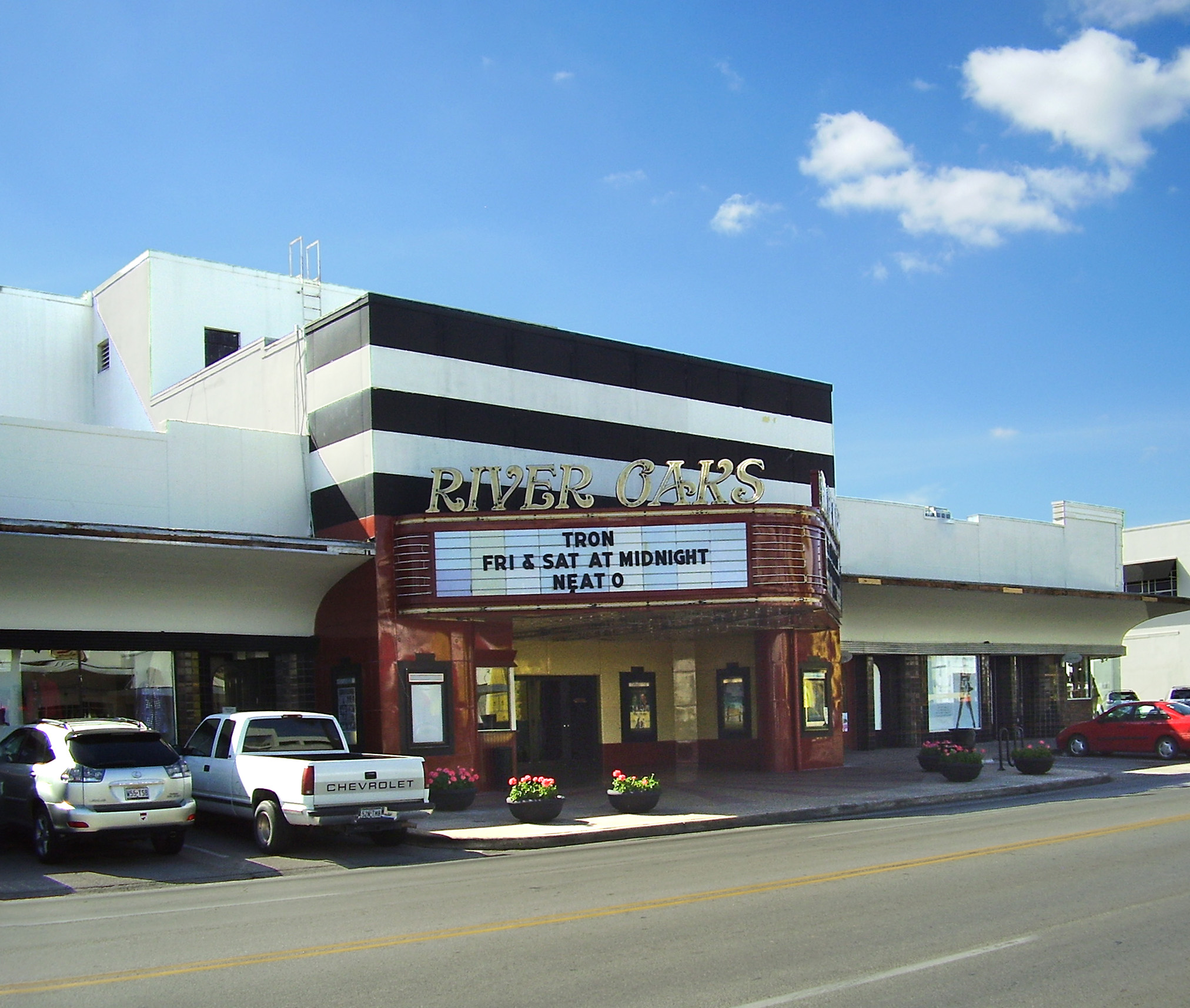
The River Oaks Theatre of Landmark Theatres, located in the River Oaks Shopping Center

The River Oaks Shopping Center, Houston's first shopping center, is located in Neartown, east of River Oaks. Constructed in 1927 and designed by architect Hugh Prather, the center, originally known as River Oaks Community Center, was one of the nation's first automobile-oriented retail centers. Its design, with arcs of retail space on either side of West Gray Avenue, was considered a model for future development. Portions of the historic shopping center were demolished in September 2007 to redevelop the site for bookstore and a parking garage. As of 2008, Landmark Theatres operates the River Oaks Theatre, an "arthouse" theater, located in the center. The theater is the last historic movie theater in Houston that is still being used as it was originally designed.

== Cityscape ==
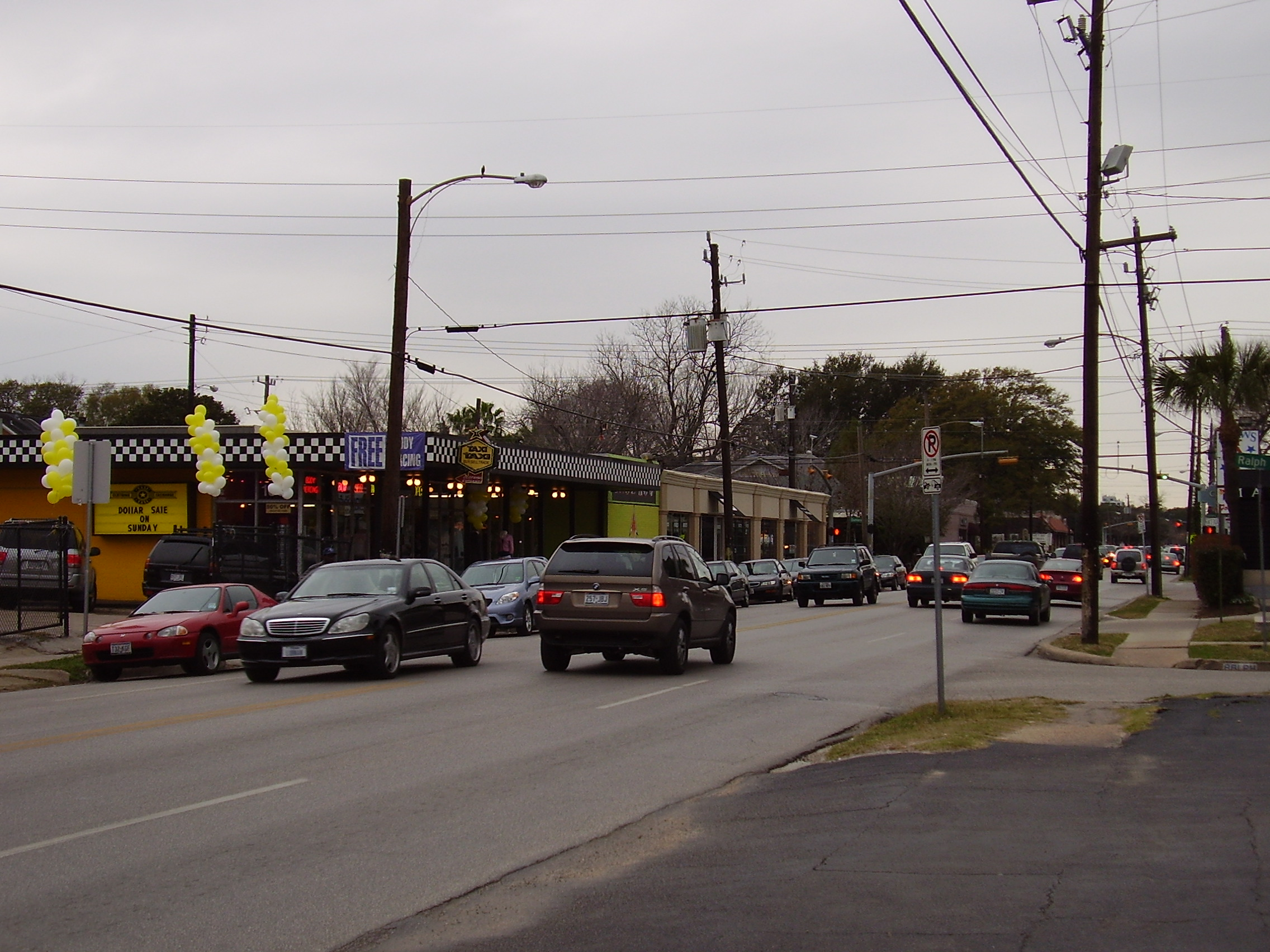
Shops along Westheimer Road—a major arterial traversing Neartown

Neartown was described in 1973 as "old buildings ranging all the way from Victorian Epic to Ramshackle Plywood." Neartown has European-style restaurants and sidewalk cafés along five blocks of Westheimer with many housed in renovated pre-World War I houses. The Neartown neighborhood along Van Buren Street was the Houston Press "Best Hidden Neighborhood" in 2002.

== Demographics ==
In 2015 the Houston city government-defined Neartown/Montrose Super Neighborhood had 31,037 residents. 71% were non-Hispanic white, 18% were Hispanic, 6% were non-Hispanic Asians, 4% were non-Hispanic blacks, and 1% were non-Hispanic others. In 2000 the super neighborhood had 28,015 people. 68% were non-Hispanic whites, 23% were Hispanic, 4% each were non-Hispanic black and Asian, and 2% were non-Hispanic others.

== Government and infrastructure ==
=== Local government ===
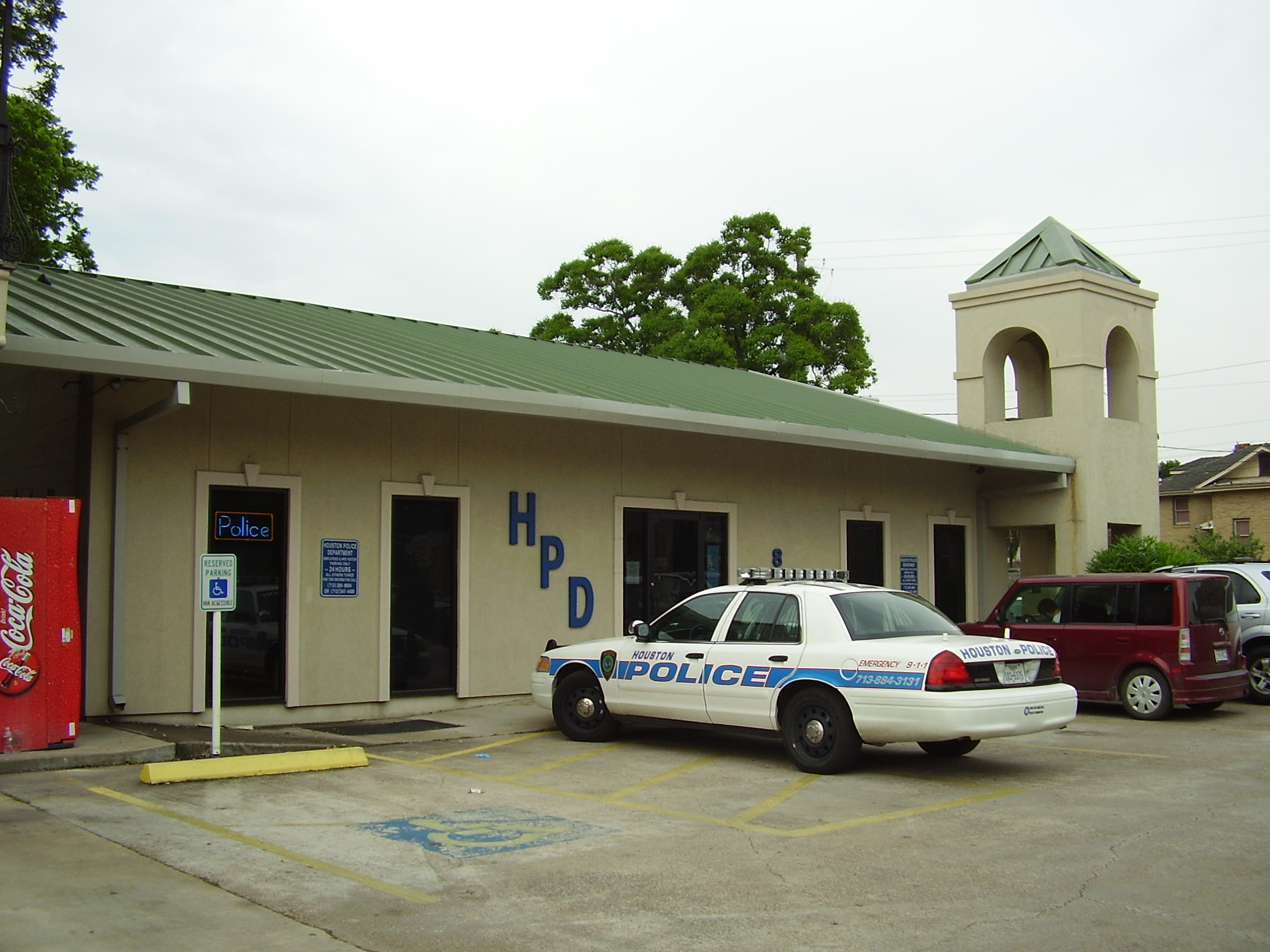
Houston Police Department Neartown Storefront

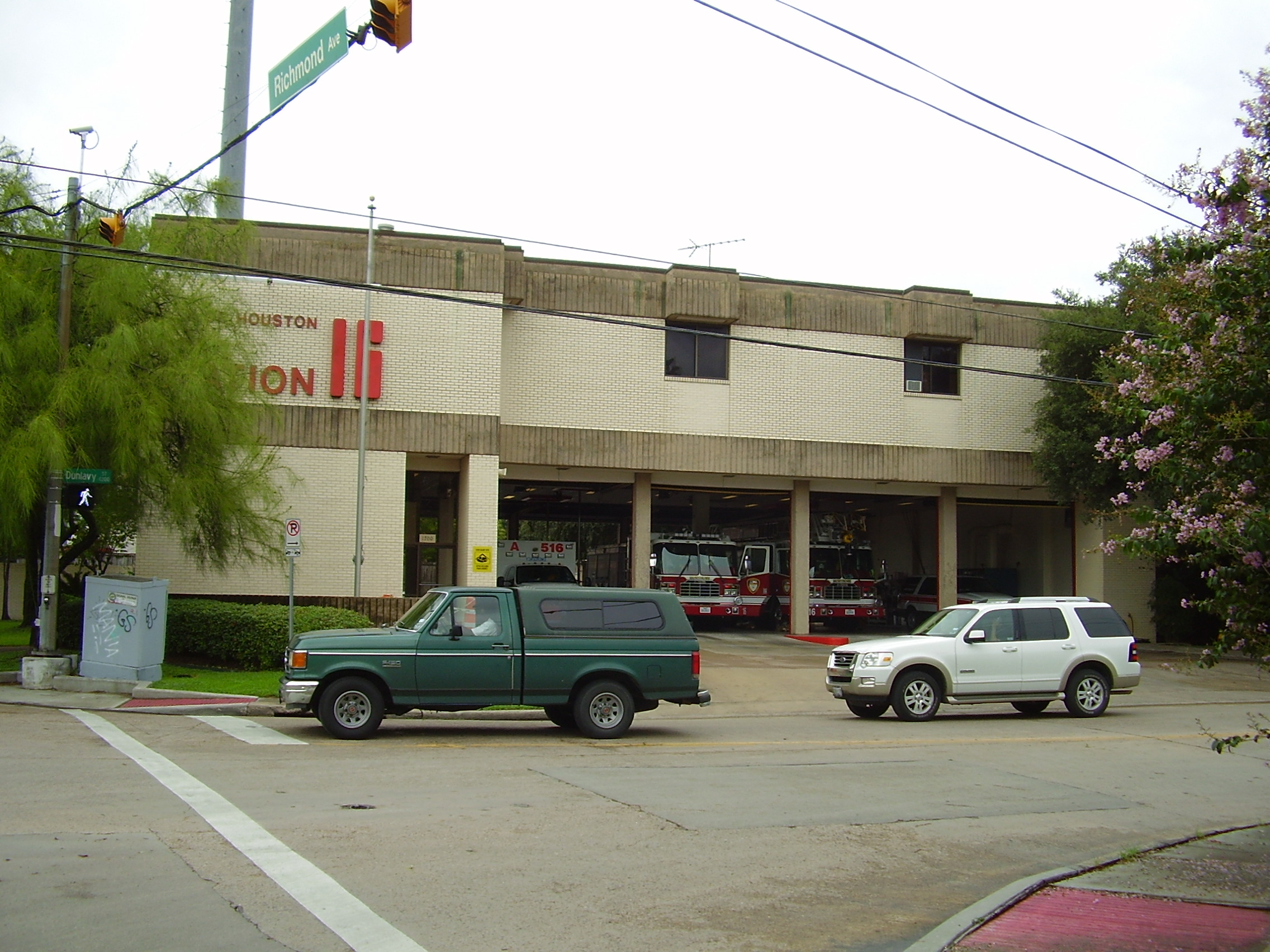
Fire Station 16

The community is within the Houston Police Department's Central Patrol Division, headquartered at 61 Riesner. The Neartown Storefront Station is located at 802 Westheimer. The City of Houston purchased the building used for the storefront with federal community development funds. By September 20, 1990, the Neartown Business Alliance spent around $4,000 per year to maintain the storefront.

Houston Fire Department Fire Station 16 serves the area. The fire station is in Fire District 6. The station opened at the intersection of Westheimer Road and Yupon in 1928. The station moved to the intersection of Richmond and Dunlavy in 1979.

City Council District D covers Neartown. As of 2008 Wanda Adams represents the district. Since the City of Houston Redistricting of 2011, Neartown has been represented in Council by Ellen Cohen in District C.

=== County, state, and federal representation ===
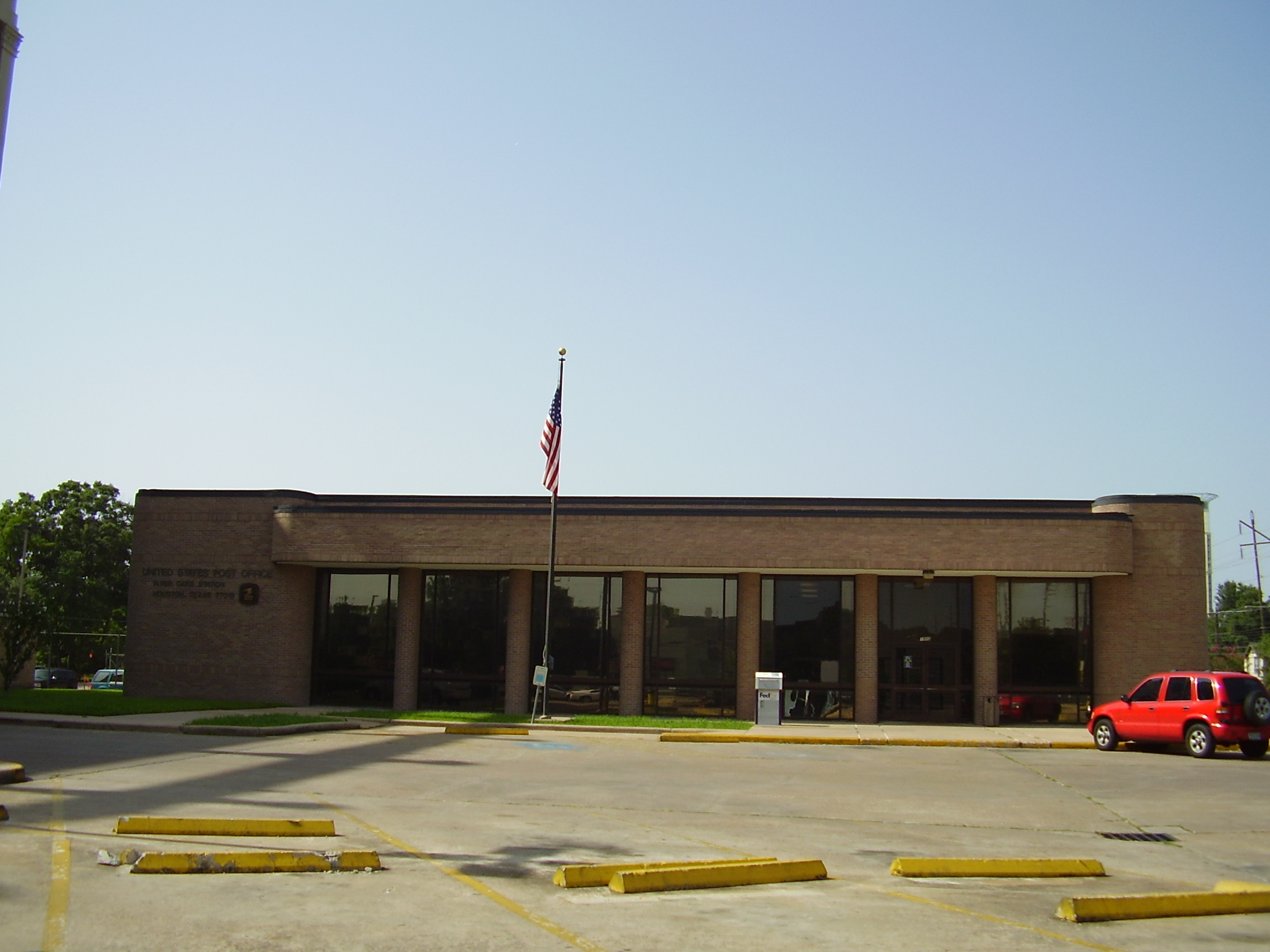
River Oaks Station Post Office

Harris County Precinct One, as of 2008 headed by El Franco Lee, serves Neartown. The county operates the Neartown Office at 1413 Westheimer Road.

A portion of Neartown is located in District 134 of the Texas House of Representatives. As of 2010, Sarah Davis represents District 134. A portion of Neartown is located in District 147 of the Texas House of Representatives. As of 2008, Garnet F. Coleman represents the district. Neartown is located in District 13 of the Texas Senate. As of 2008 its representative is Rodney Ellis.

The community is located within Texas's 7th congressional district. Since redistricting effective for the 2012 election, Neartown has been redrawn into the Texas 2nd Congressional District, served by Ted Poe. The United States Postal Service operates two post offices, the University Post Office at 1319 Richmond Avenue and the River Oaks Station Post Office at 1900 West Gray Street, in Neartown.

== Places of interest ==
Museums

- Menil Collection art museum
- Rothko Chapel
- Houston Center for Photography
- Byzantine Fresco Chapel Museum
- Museo Guadalupe Aztlan
- Museum of Printing History

Consulates

- Consulate-General of the People's Republic of China (closed)
- Consulate-General of Norway

Radio

- KPFT 90.1 FM, a Pacifica Radio affiliate, located at 419 Lovett Boulevard

Community

- Houston GLBT Community Center
- Pride Committee of Houston

Festivals

- Houston Greek Festival, usually held in October, on the grounds of the Annunciation Greek Orthodox Cathedral

Parades

- Houston Art Car Parade
- Houston Gay Pride Parade to commemorate the Stonewall Riots

Cathedrals and Churches

- Annunciation Greek Orthodox Cathedral
- Chapel of St. Basil at the University of St. Thomas (Texas)(designed by esteemed architect Philip Johnson)

== Economy ==
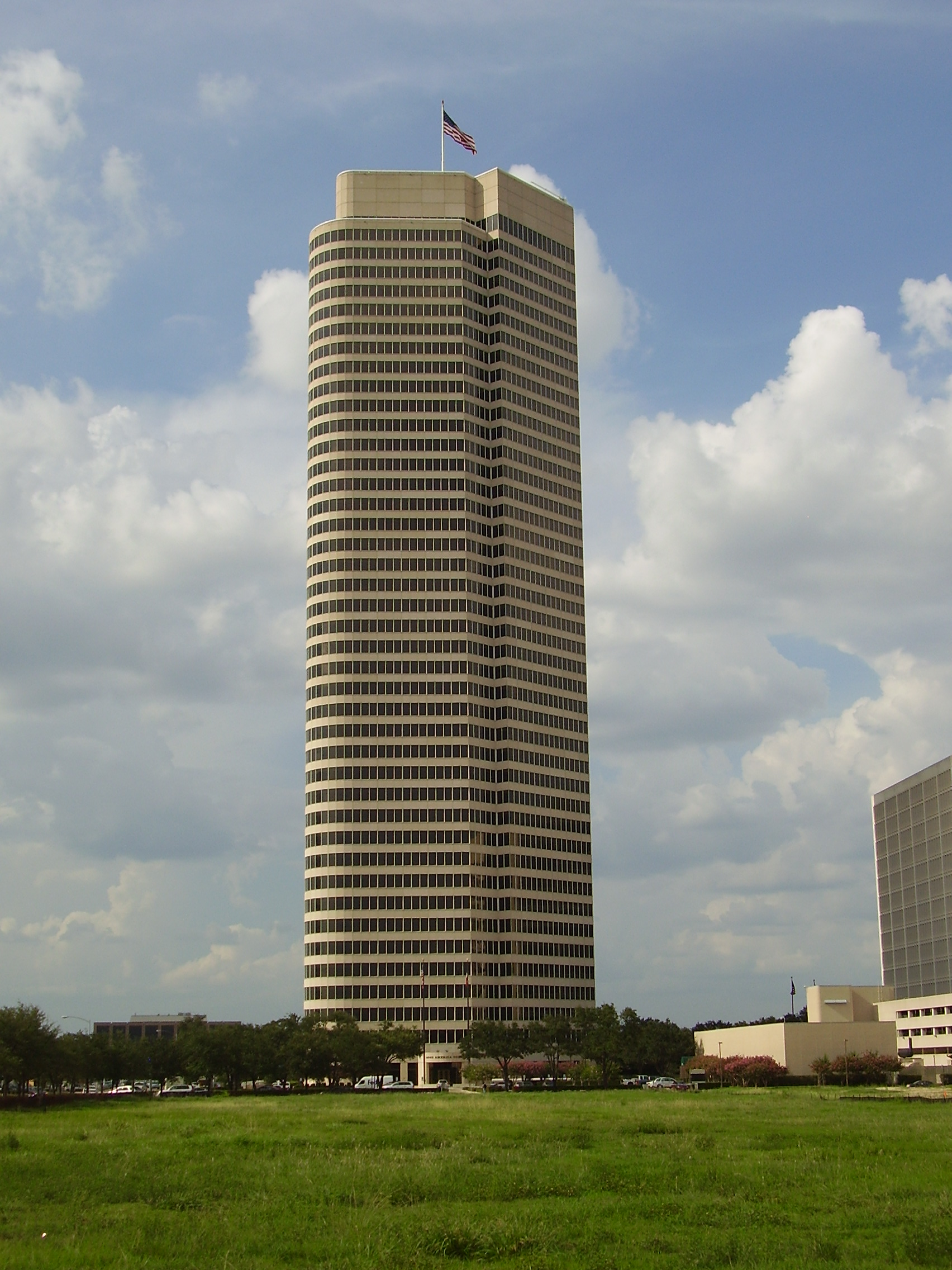
The America Tower houses the headquarters of Baker Hughes; the tower hosted Continental Airlines's headquarters from 1983 to 1998

The headquarters of Baker Hughes is in the America Tower at the American General Center Service Corporation International has its headquarters in Neartown.

On July 1, 1983 Continental Airlines's headquarters were located at the America Tower in Neartown, and would remain there until the relocation to Continental Center I in Downtown Houston, announced by the airline in 1997, that occurred in stages in 1998 and 1999.

== Education ==
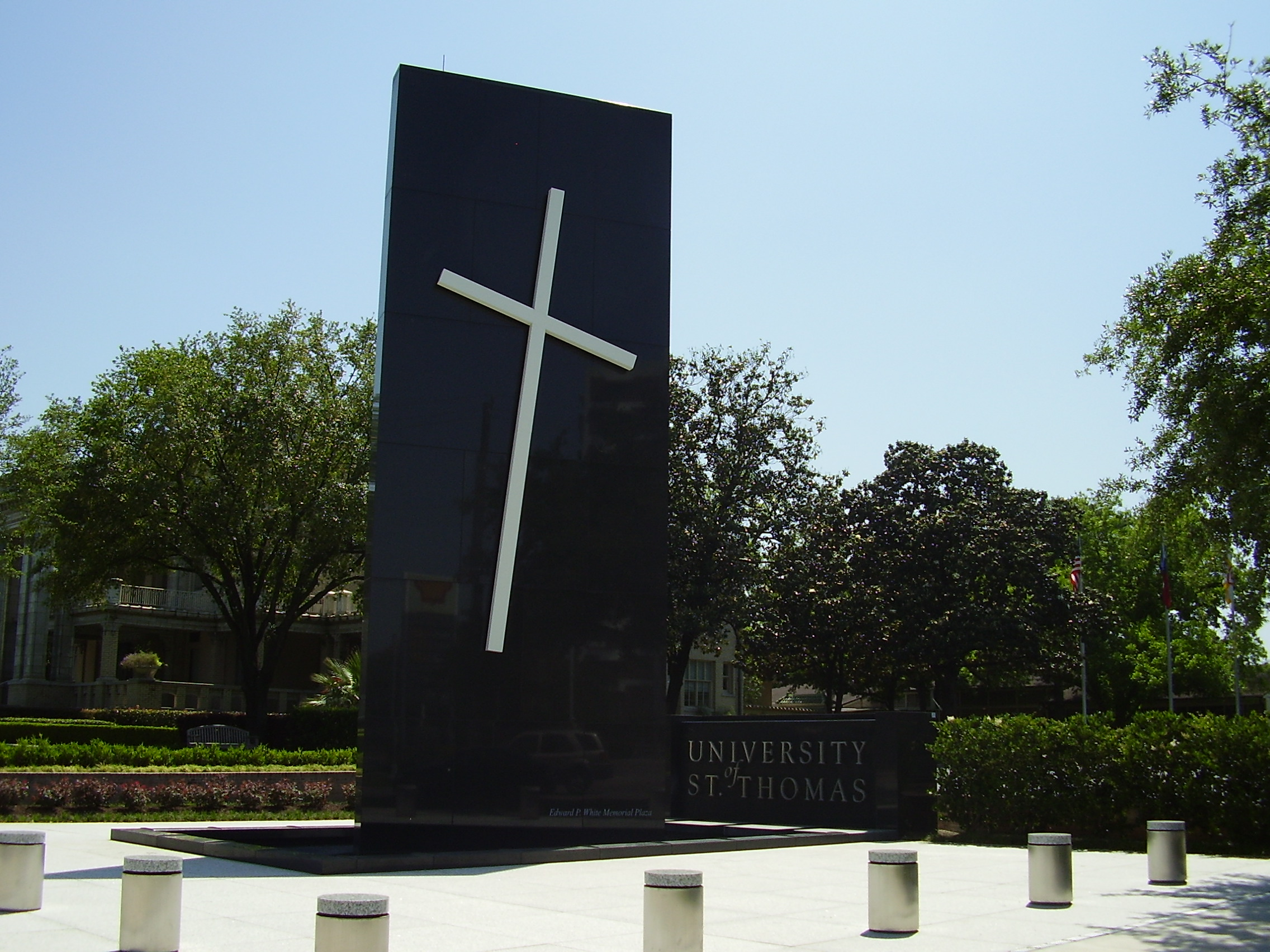
The University of Saint Thomas

=== Colleges and universities ===
Neartown is home to the University of Saint Thomas.

Neartown is also close to Rice University, The University of Texas Health Science Center at Houston, the University of Houston, Texas Southern University, Houston Community College Central, and University of Houston–Downtown.

=== Primary and secondary education ===
==== Public schools ====
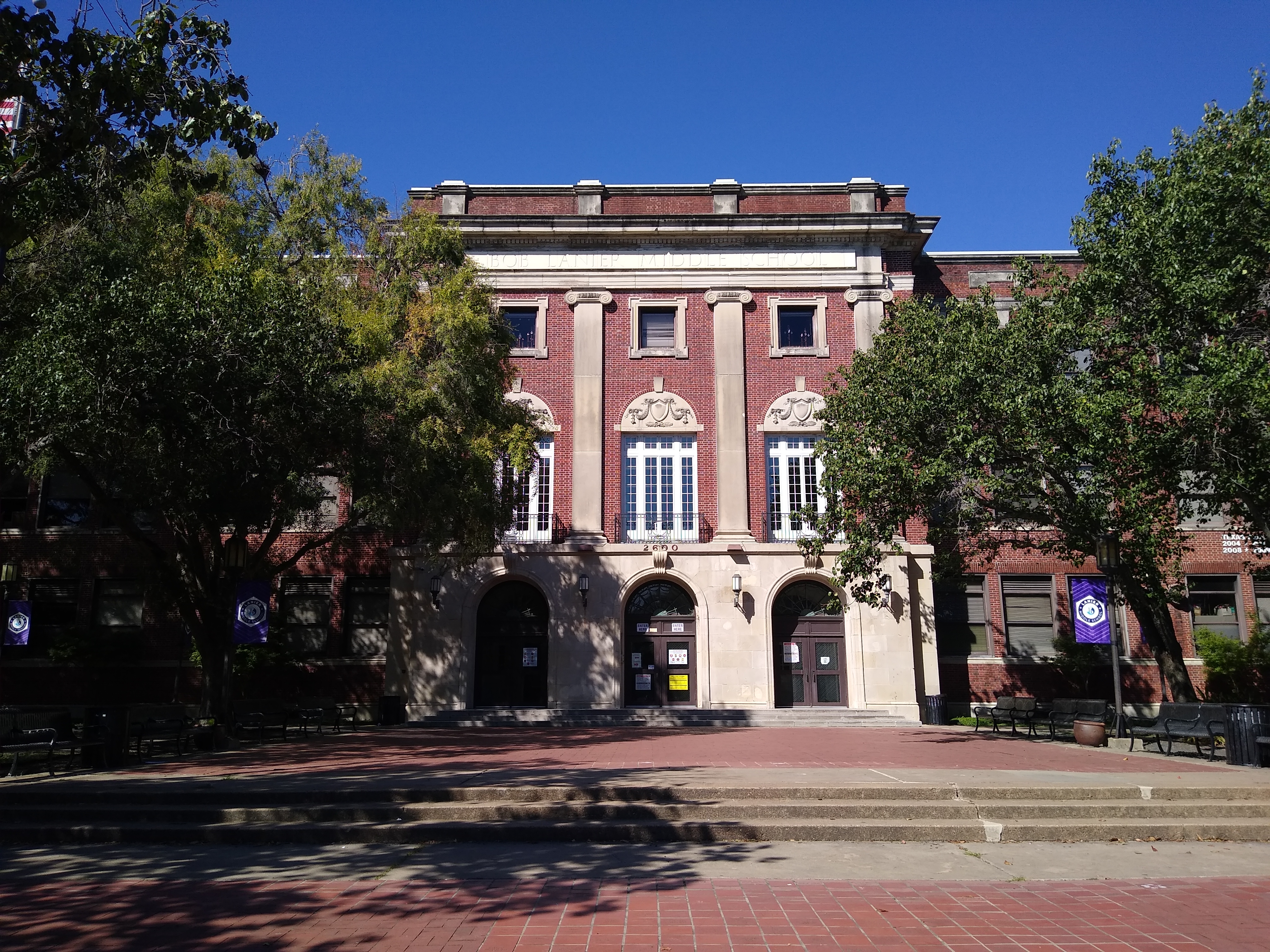
Lanier Middle School serves the western half of Neartown

Pupils in Neartown are in the Houston Independent School District. Neartown is divided among Trustee District IV, represented by Paula M. Harris as of 2008, Trustee District V, represented by Dianne Johnson as of 2008, and Trustee District VIII, represented by Diana Dávila as of 2008.

Baker Montessori School (formerly Wilson Montessori School, in Neartown), Gregory-Lincoln Education Center (in the Fourth Ward), MacGregor Elementary School, Poe Elementary School (in Boulevard Oaks), and Wharton Elementary School (in Neartown) serve separate sections of Neartown.

Pupils in Neartown reside within the boundaries of three middle-school attendance areas. Lanier Middle School (in Neartown), Cullen Middle School, and Gregory-Lincoln Education Center serve separate sections of Neartown. All Neartown area pupils are zoned to Lamar High School in Upper Kirby.

In Fall 2019 Arabic Immersion Magnet School is scheduled to move into the former High School for the Performing and Visual Arts building.

===== Histories of schools =====
For a period, Montrose Elementary School was in Neartown. Southmore Elementary School opened in 1921, Wilson in 1925, Lanier in 1926, Poe in 1928, and Wharton in 1929. Southmore was renamed MacGregor Elementary School in 1930 and Lamar opened in 1937. Ryan opened in 1958 after Yates High School moved to a new campus. Gregory-Lincoln opened in 1966 and its current facility opened in 2007. Before the start of the 2009–2010 school year J. Will Jones, which formerly served a section of Neartown, was consolidated into Blackshear Elementary School, a campus in the Third Ward. During its final year of enrollment J. Will Jones had more students than Blackshear.

Previously Ryan Middle School served a segment of Neartown. In March 2013 the HISD board voted to close Ryan Middle School and move all students into the zone of Cullen Middle School. The High School for the Performing and Visual Arts moved to Downtown Houston in 2019.

===== Gallery of public schools =====
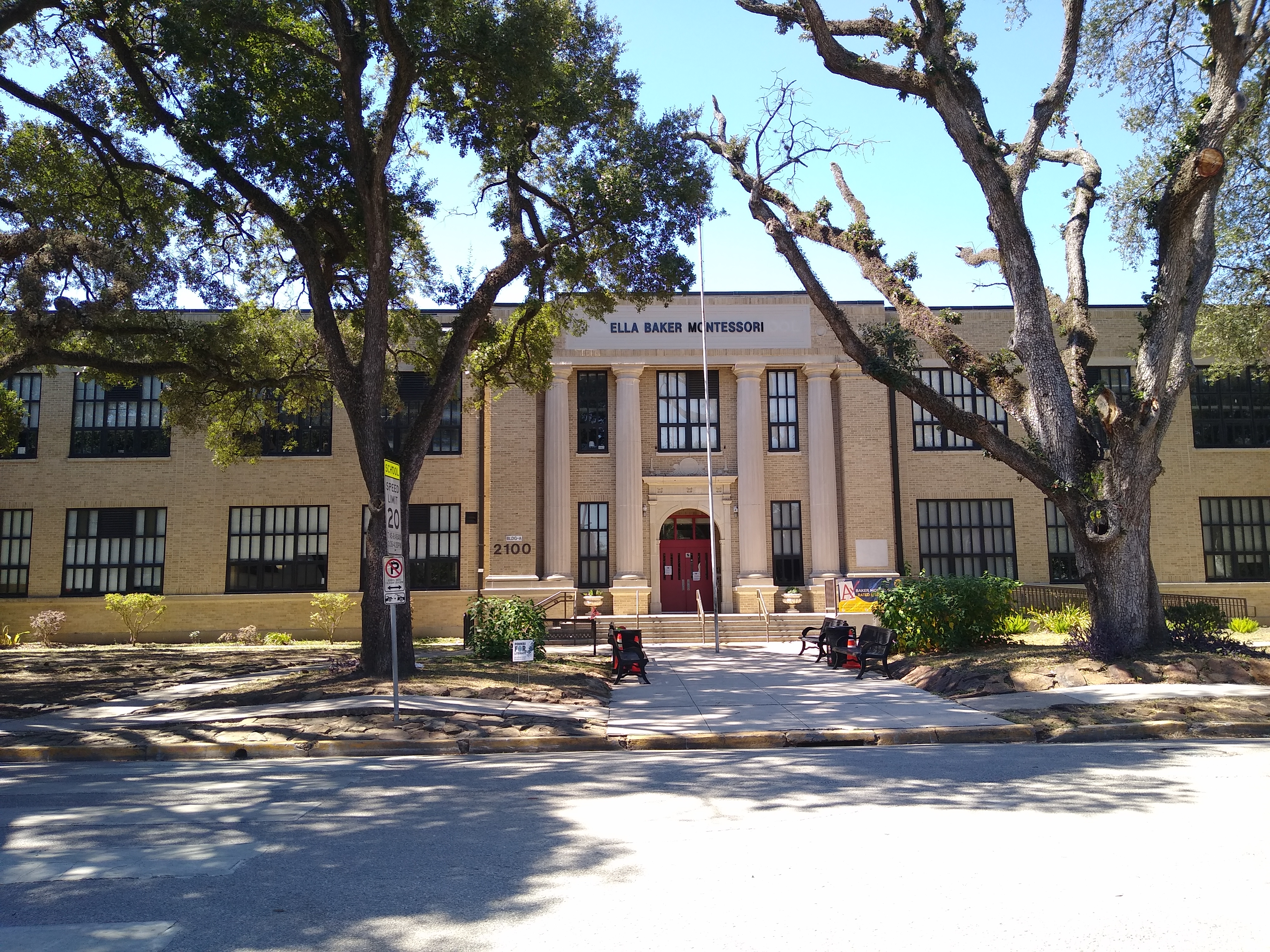
Ella J. Baker Montessori School

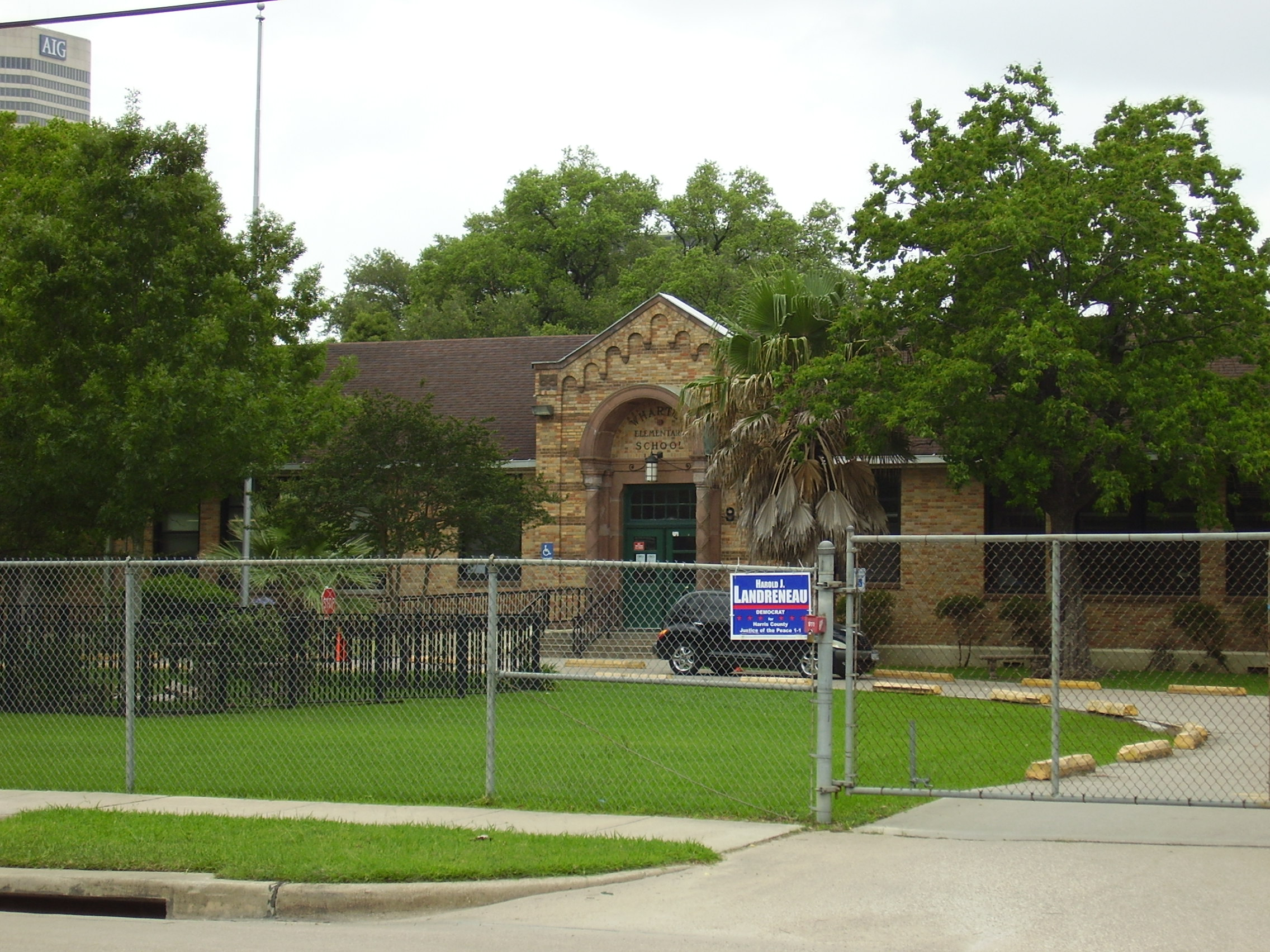
Wharton Dual Language Academy serves a northern portion of Neartown

==== Private schools ====
Neartown is home to the Annunciation Orthodox School (a K-8 private school) and The Harris School. The Kinkaid School was located in the Neartown area until 1957 when the school moved to Piney Point Village.

===== Gallery of private schools =====
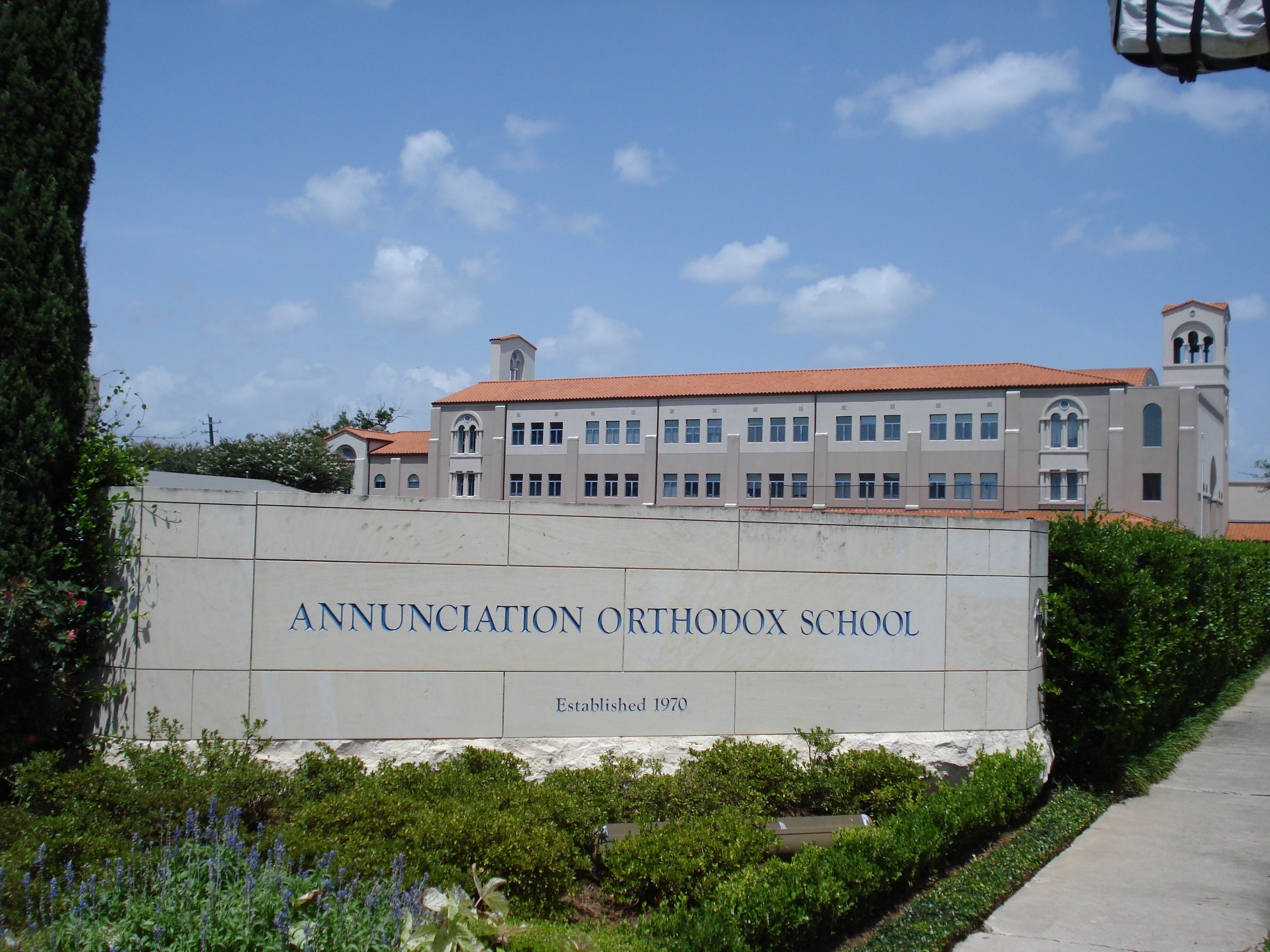
Annunciation Orthodox School

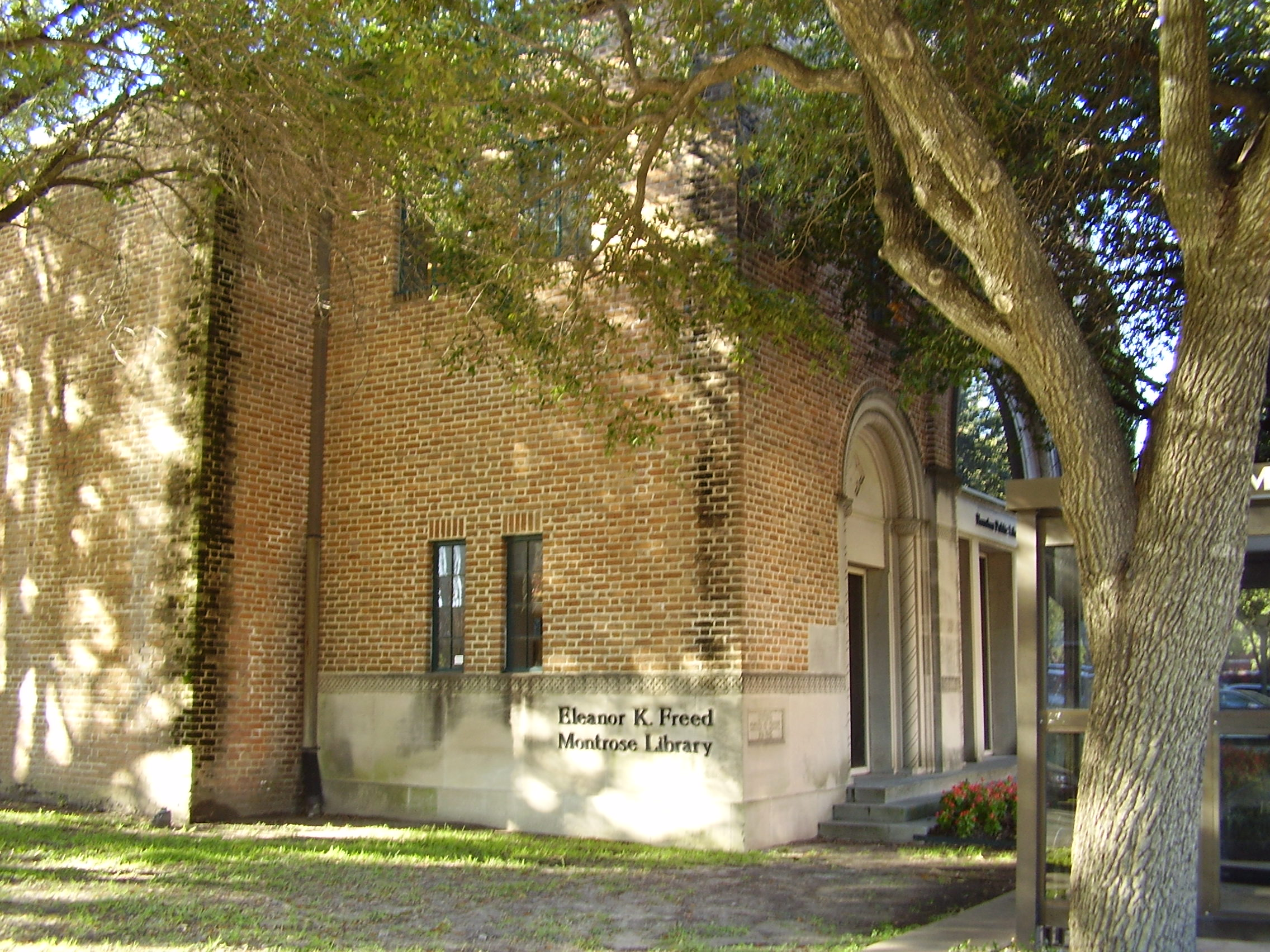
The Eleanor K. Freed Montrose Library of the Houston Public Library

=== Public libraries ===
The administrative offices of the Houston Public Library are located in the Marston Building in Neartown. The City of Houston spent $1.3 million to renovate the Marston Building to accommodate HPL staff. The administration moved to the building after the Central Library was scheduled to close in 2006.

The Eleanor K. Freed-Montrose Neighborhood Library of Houston Public Library is at 4100 Montrose Boulevard.

== Media ==
The Houston Chronicle is the area regional newspaper. The River Oaks Examiner is a local newspaper distributed in the community.

== Health services ==
Legacy Community Health Services and Montrose Counseling Center are located in Neartown. In 2006 the Metropolitan Multi-Service Center was moved from the Houston Department of Health and Human Services to the Houston Parks and Recreation Department. It became the West Gray Adaptive Recreation Center.

== Parks and recreation ==
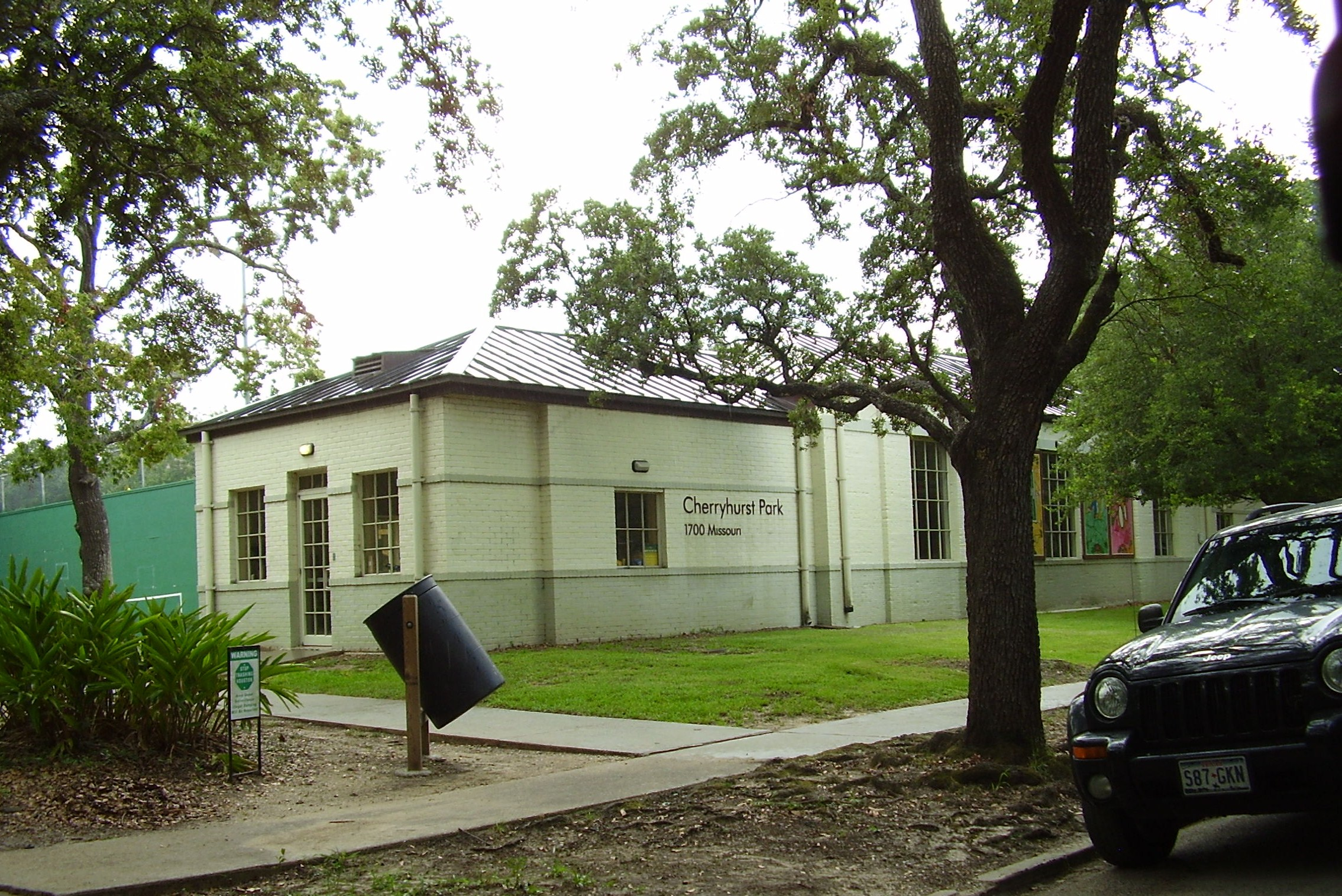
Cherryhurst Park

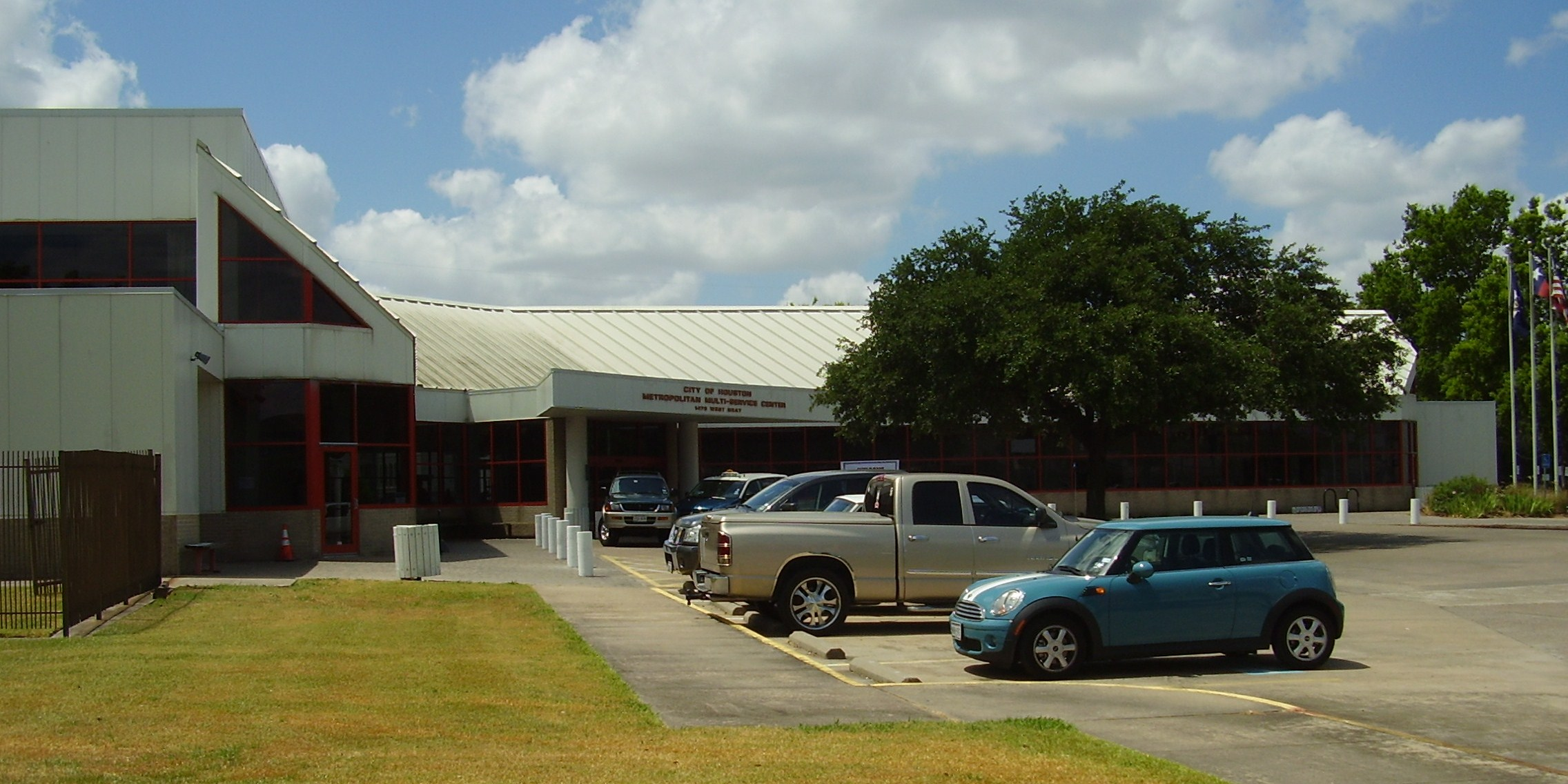
Metropolitan Multi-Service Center a.k.a. the West Gray Adaptive Recreation Center

Ervan Chew Park, a fenced-in, approximately 9,000-square-foot (840 m^{2}) park, is located at 4502 Dunlavy Street. The park (originally Herbert D. Dunlavy Park) was acquired by the City of Houston in 1945. In February 2000 the park was renamed for Ervan Chew, a Chinese-American Eagle Scout who grew up in the area and won the Silver Beaver Award, which was delivered by Ronald Reagan, in 1986; Chew died at age 42, on January 19, 1999. Chew Park has a basketball half court, small soccer (football) field, a dog park and a baseball diamond. Ervan Chew Park has little league games and dog parties. The Neartown Little League, located in Neartown, holds its games at Chew Park. Chew Park was the first park to let dogs run without leashes in a special zone. The Friends of Ervan Chew Park funded the dog zone, which was dedicated in May 2004.

== Notable residents ==
- Denton Cooley
- Walter Cronkite
- Clark Gable
- Howard Hughes
- Lyndon B. Johnson
- Mirabeau B. Lamar (the site for Lamar's family home is now Baker Montessori School)

== Gallery ==
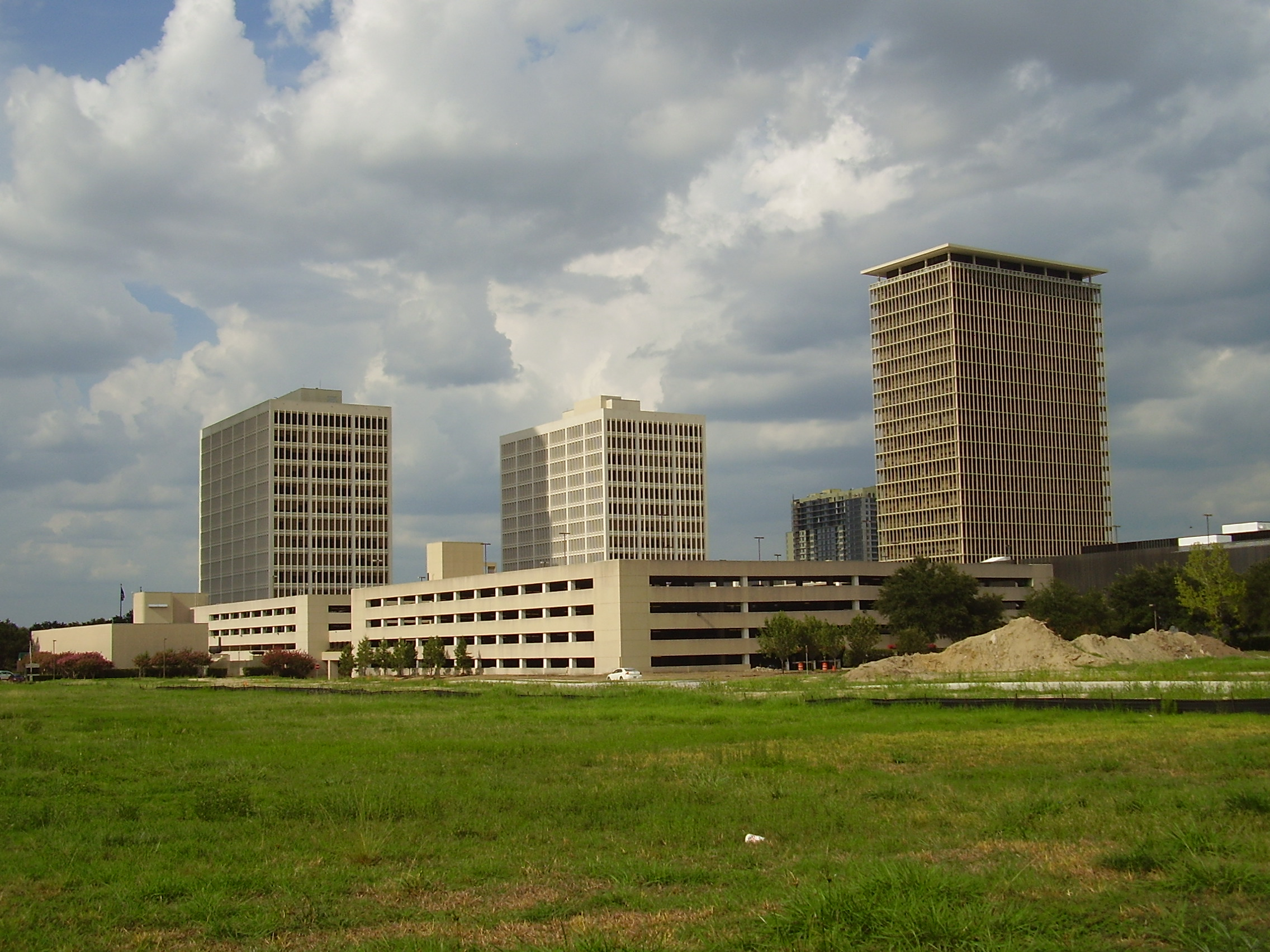
Four of the towers of the American General Complex

== See also ==
- Westheimer Street Festival
- Bayou City Art Festival
