= River Oaks, Houston =

Subdivision in Texas, USA

Coordinates: 29.751°N 95.433°W

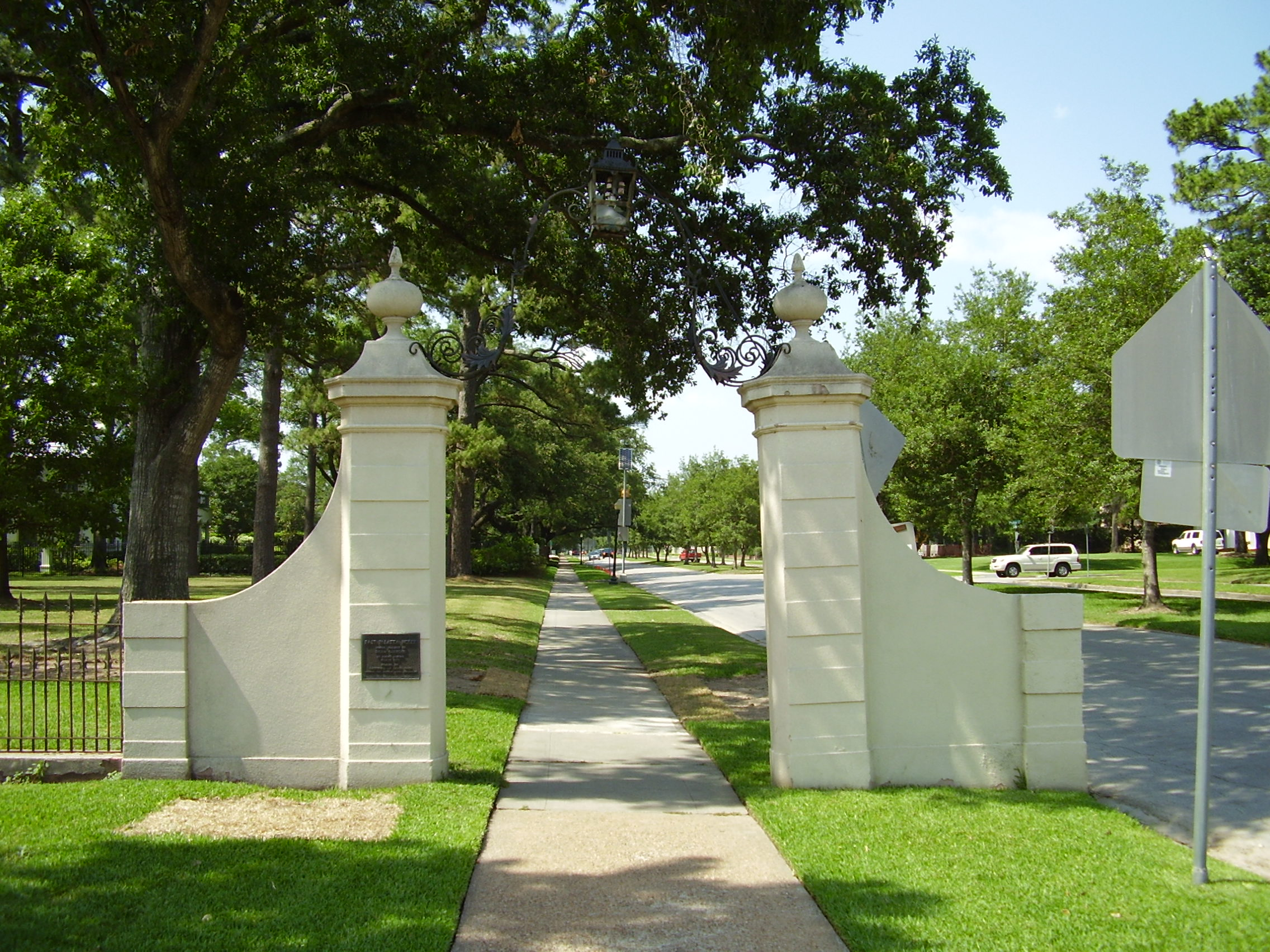
The marker at an entrance to River Oaks

River Oaks is a residential community located in the center of Houston, Texas, United States. Located within the 610 Loop and between Downtown and Uptown, the community spans 1,100 acres (450 ha). Established in the 1920s by brothers Will Hogg and Michael Hogg, the community became a well-publicized national model for community planning. Real estate values in the community range from $1 million to over $20 million. River Oaks was also named the most expensive neighborhood in Houston in 2013. The community is home to River Oaks Country Club, which includes a golf course designed by architect Donald Ross and redesigned in 2015 by Tom Fazio.

== History ==
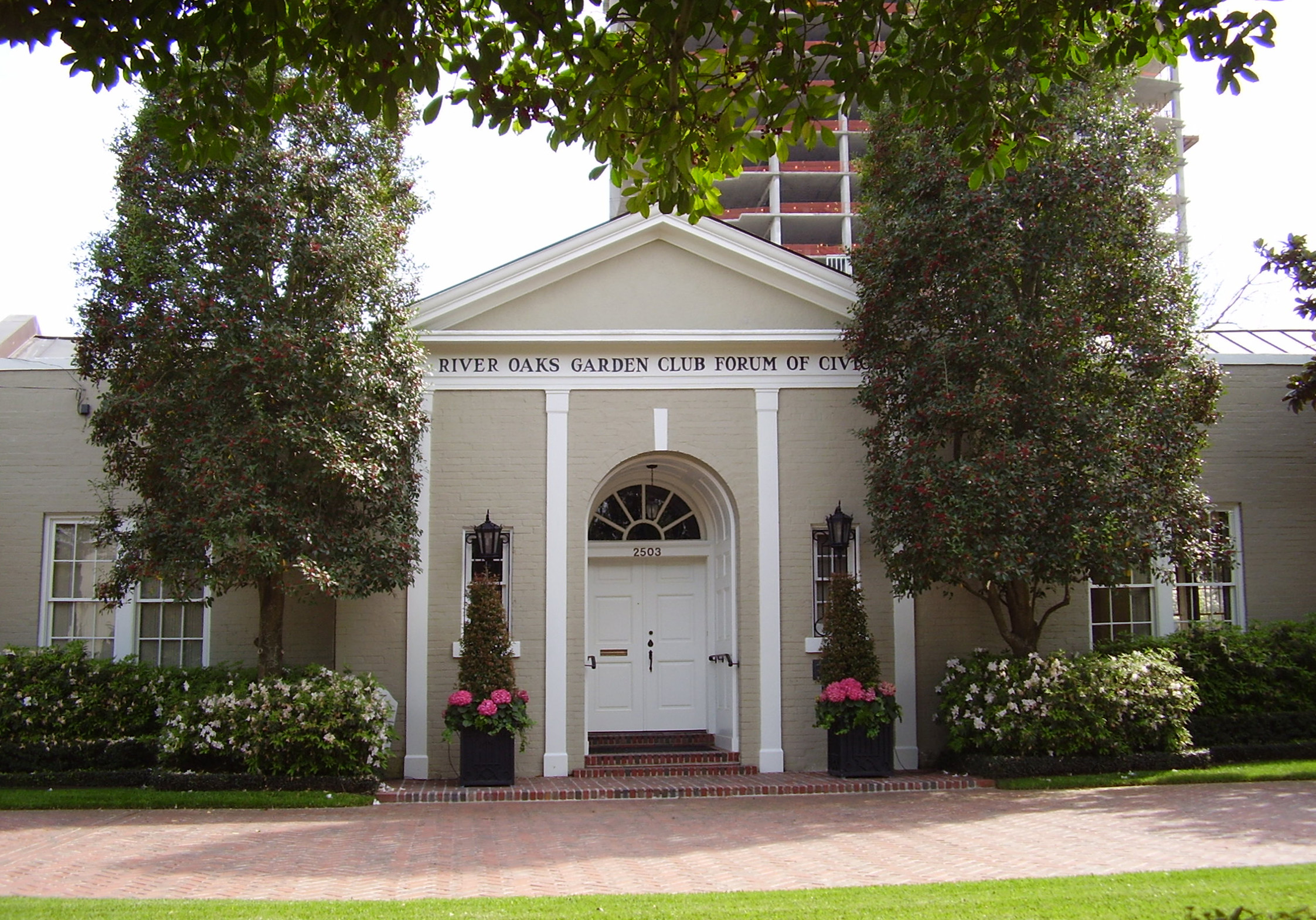
The River Oaks Garden Club Forum of Civics, located in Upper Kirby

In 1923, Thomas William House, Jr., Thomas H. Ball, and Junius W. Reynolds founded the Country Club Estates Company. This firm acquired two large tracts west of Houston totalling 360 acres for the purpose of developing a subdivision. County Club Estates Company sold investors shares to fund the River Oaks Country Club, which they chartered on February 1, 1923. The club developed both recreational facilities for adults and children.

Country Club Estates Company planned a residential subdivision near the country club grounds. Kenneth E. Womack and Ball sold club memberships and also charter memberships which bundled a club membership with a share of stock in the residential investment. They raised a total of $249,750 for Country Club Estates Company. They hired Herbert A. Kipp for the design of the first subdivision, covering an area of about 178 acres. Keeping with the country club theme, Kipp laid out wide, curving roads for a non-gridded network and named some of them for well-known country clubs. Some of the larger lots ranged from one-quarter acre to four acres in size.

William and Michael Hogg, the sons of former Texas governor Jim Hogg, and attorney Hugh Potter established River Oaks in the 1920s. Potter obtained an option to purchase 200 acres (81 ha) around the River Oaks Country Club in 1923, and in the following year William Hogg established the Country Club Estates in order to support the development of the community. The two brothers promoted the sale of lots in the subdivision for US$2,200 (equivalent to $41,250 in 2025) apiece in 1928. The brothers, along with sister Ima Hogg, oversaw the construction of Bayou Bend, a stately southern-style home on the banks of Buffalo Bayou.

The first development of River Oaks was the summer house of William L. Clayton. Houston-architect Birdsall Briscoe completed this Colonial Revival home for the Clayton family in 1924. This property is a City of Houston Landmark and is listed on the National Register of Historic Places.

The development plans ensured that River Oaks's parks and esplanades were planted with oaks, shrubs, azaleas and other flowers. Every detail of the development was planned to establish a well-integrated community. Advertised as a "distinguished experiment in fine living," River Oaks became a national model for community planning. River Oaks' planning standards, residential architecture, and landscape design were publicized during the 1920s and 1930s in national newspapers, real estate media and design journals. Deed restrictions at the time restricted home prices to over $7,000 and specified architectural styles, with a gentlemen's agreement excluding blacks, Jews, and other minorities. Homes along Kirby Drive were restricted to American Colonial or English Tudor style architecture.

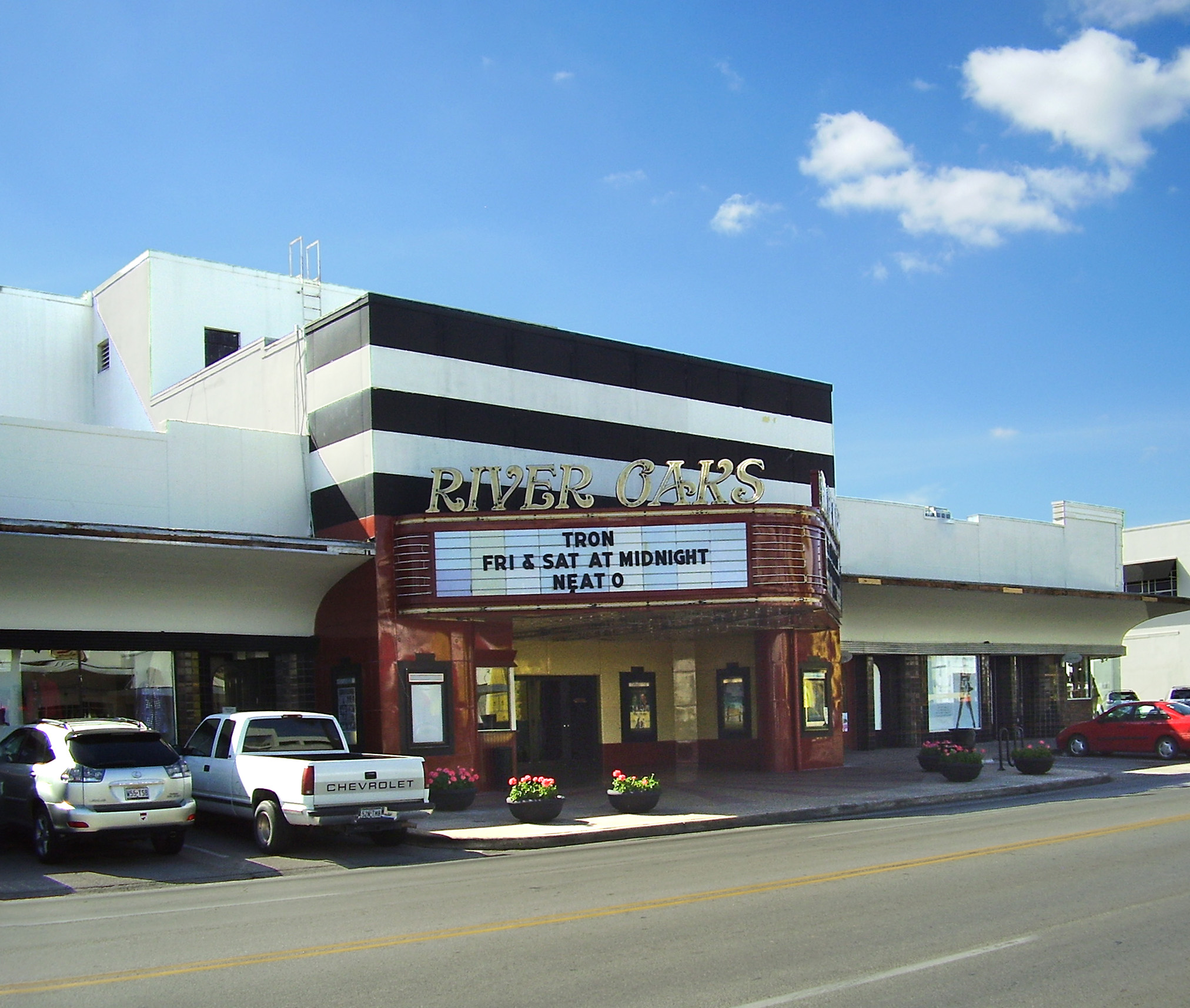
The River Oaks Theatre of Landmark Theatres, located east of River Oaks in the River Oaks Shopping Center in Neartown

During the 1920s, River Oaks was so effectively organized, planned and restricted that it became the most expensive neighborhood in Houston. The City of Houston annexed the community in 1927, adding 3,465 acres (1,402 ha) of land to the city limits. Bus service to Downtown Houston opened during the same year. After World War II, as Houston experienced its greatest growth, River Oaks became a haven for the wealthy of the city.

River Oaks has been the subject matter of scholarly studies, primarily because its significant contributions to Houston's history and development as an elite suburban community. The community was the site of the 1972 murder of Dr. John Hill (later described in Thomas Thompson's novel, Blood and Money). River Oaks was the home of Jeff Skilling before he began serving a 25-year prison sentence for his involvement in the Enron scandal.

The River Oaks Garden Club Forum of Civics, located in Upper Kirby, is listed in the National Register of Historic Places as the "Forum of Civics" on October 13, 1988. Formerly a county schoolhouse, the building is currently the administrative center for the River Oaks Garden Club.

In 2011 Bloomberg Businessweek ranked River Oaks as the seventh most expensive housing blocks in the United States.

In 2017 Hurricane Harvey caused some flooding in River Oaks.

== Geography ==
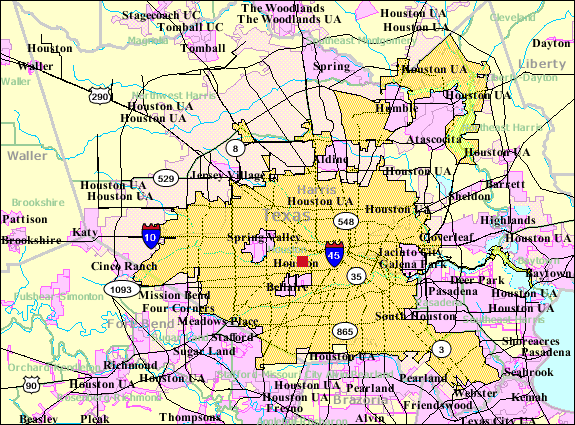
Location of River Oaks in the City of Houston

Located within the 610 Loop and between Downtown and Uptown, River Oaks spans 1,100 acres (450 ha). The community is located in a region bounded on the north by Buffalo Bayou, on the east by South Shepherd Drive, on the west by Willowick Road, and on the south by Westheimer Road. River Oaks is located northeast of Uptown, north of the Upper Kirby district, west of Neartown, and is near to the freeway system and many major thoroughfares such as Westheimer Road, Kirby Drive and San Felipe Street.

River Oaks Boulevard, a road that runs through the center of the community, is lined on both sides by mansions and estates located away from the street. The two square mile (5.2 m^{2}) area of the subdivision comprises approximately 1,600 homes, mostly detached single family homes. In 1990, the Houston Chronicle said that "[t]he grandest streets are probably River Oaks Boulevard and Lazy Lane. Some of the houses are monstrosities, but many show taste and grace and also have lovely gardens."

== Demographics ==
River Oaks is within the Houston Super Neighborhood #23 Afton Oaks/River Oaks, a division of the City of Houston that includes River Oaks and some surrounding subdivisions, including Afton Oaks. In 2015 the super neighborhood had 14,518 residents; 77% were non-Hispanic White, 10% were Hispanic, 7% were non-Hispanic Asian, 4% were non-Hispanic black, and 2% were non-Hispanic other.

According to the 2000 U.S. census, the super neighborhood had 14,313 residents; 12,273 of them (85.7%) were White, 1,160 (8.1%) were Hispanic, 390 (2.7%) were Asian, 247 (1.7%) were Black, 18 were Native American, 13 were Native Hawaiian, and 23 were Others. 189 people were of two or more races. Of the 12,088 residents over 18 years of age, 10,390 (86.0%) were White, 945 (7.8%) were Hispanic, 353 (2.9%) were Asian, 205 (1.7%) were Black, 17 were Native American, 8 were Native Hawaiian, and 22 were Other. 148 were of two or more races.

As of 2000 the neighborhood had 8,169 housing units. Of the 7,401 occupied units, 3,573 were rental units and 3,828 were owner units. The Super Neighborhood had 3,518 families with a total of 9,521 individuals. River Oaks Super Neighborhood had a lower average family size than the average City of Houston family size. The River Oaks average was 2.7, while the city average was 3.4.

River Oaks is one of the wealthiest communities in Texas and the United States. Real estate values range from $1 million to over $20 million.

== Architecture ==
The community has multiple houses deemed historic by the city government's planning commission. As of 2020 the law allows for demolition of city-designated landmarks after a 90-day waiting period, so by 2020 multiple property owners tore down their respective historic landmarks. 80 demolition permits of River Oaks permits residences were approved in 2018 and 2019.

== Culture, parks, and recreation ==
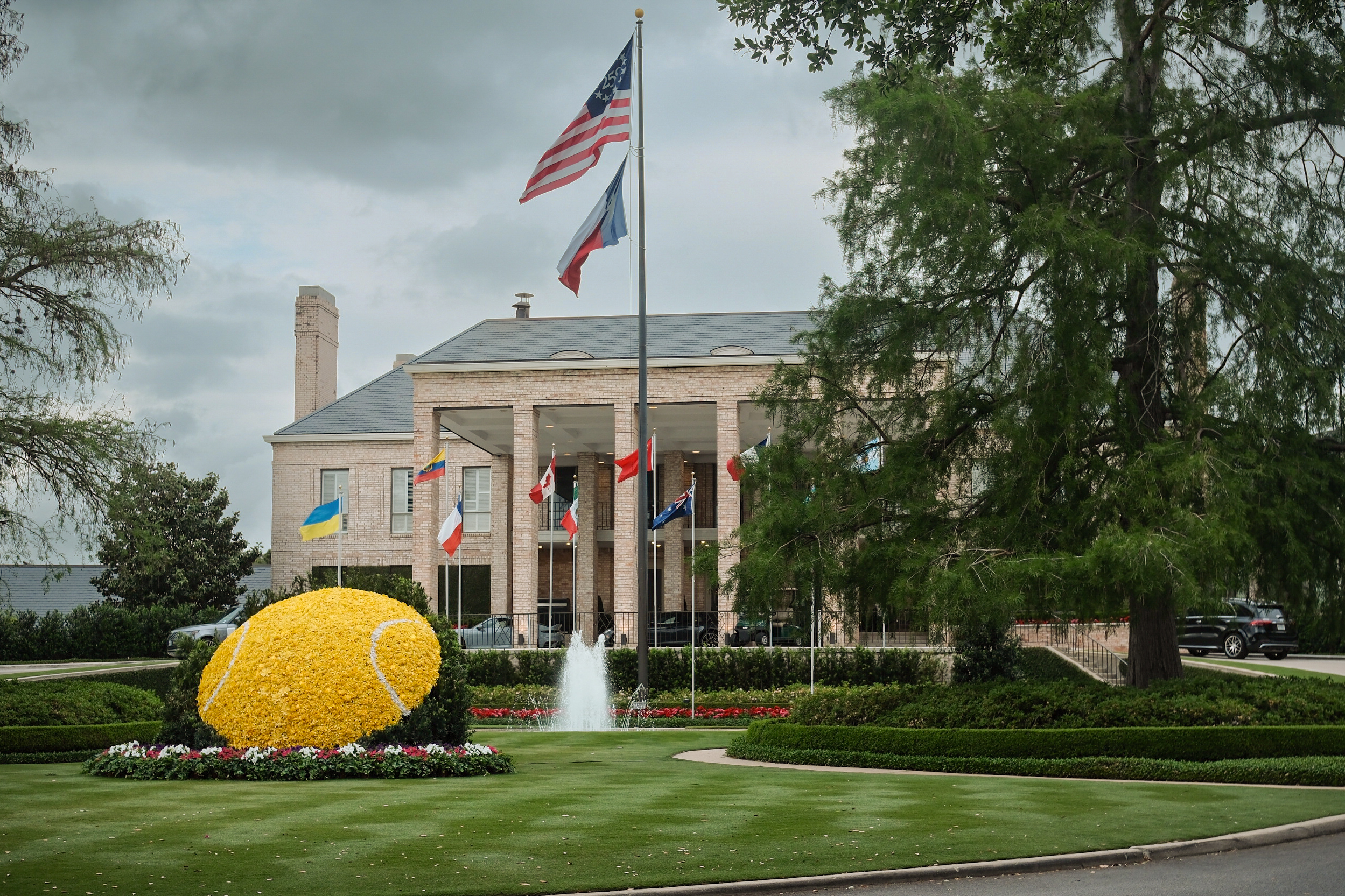
River Oaks Country Club

Adjacent to the community is the River Oaks Shopping Center, Houston's first shopping center. Constructed in 1927 and designed by architect Hugh Prather, the center, originally known as River Oaks Community Center, was one of the first automobile-oriented retail centers in the United States. Its design, with arcs of retail space on either side of West Gray Avenue, was considered a model for future development. Portions of the historic shopping center were demolished in September 2007 to redevelop the site for a bookstore and parking garage. As of 2008, Landmark Theatres operates the River Oaks Theatre, an "arthouse" theater, located in the center. The theater is the last historic movie theater in Houston that is still being used as it was originally designed.

River Oaks is home to the forty-member River Oaks Chamber Orchestra. The orchestra is composed of musicians from around the United States and guest conductors from around the world. River Oaks Country Club, located within the community on the northern end of River Oaks Boulevard, is a country club that includes a golf facility that was designed by architect Donald Ross. Ross is considered to be one of the most significant golf course designers in the history of golfing. Opening in 1923, the country club has hosted the River Oaks International Tennis Tournament since 1931. The Houston Intown Chamber of Commerce assists economic activity in River Oaks. The Houston Ballet headquarters, training facilities and pre-professional school, the Ben Stevenson Academy, were located on West Gray near the River Oaks Shopping Center until 2012.

=== Parks ===
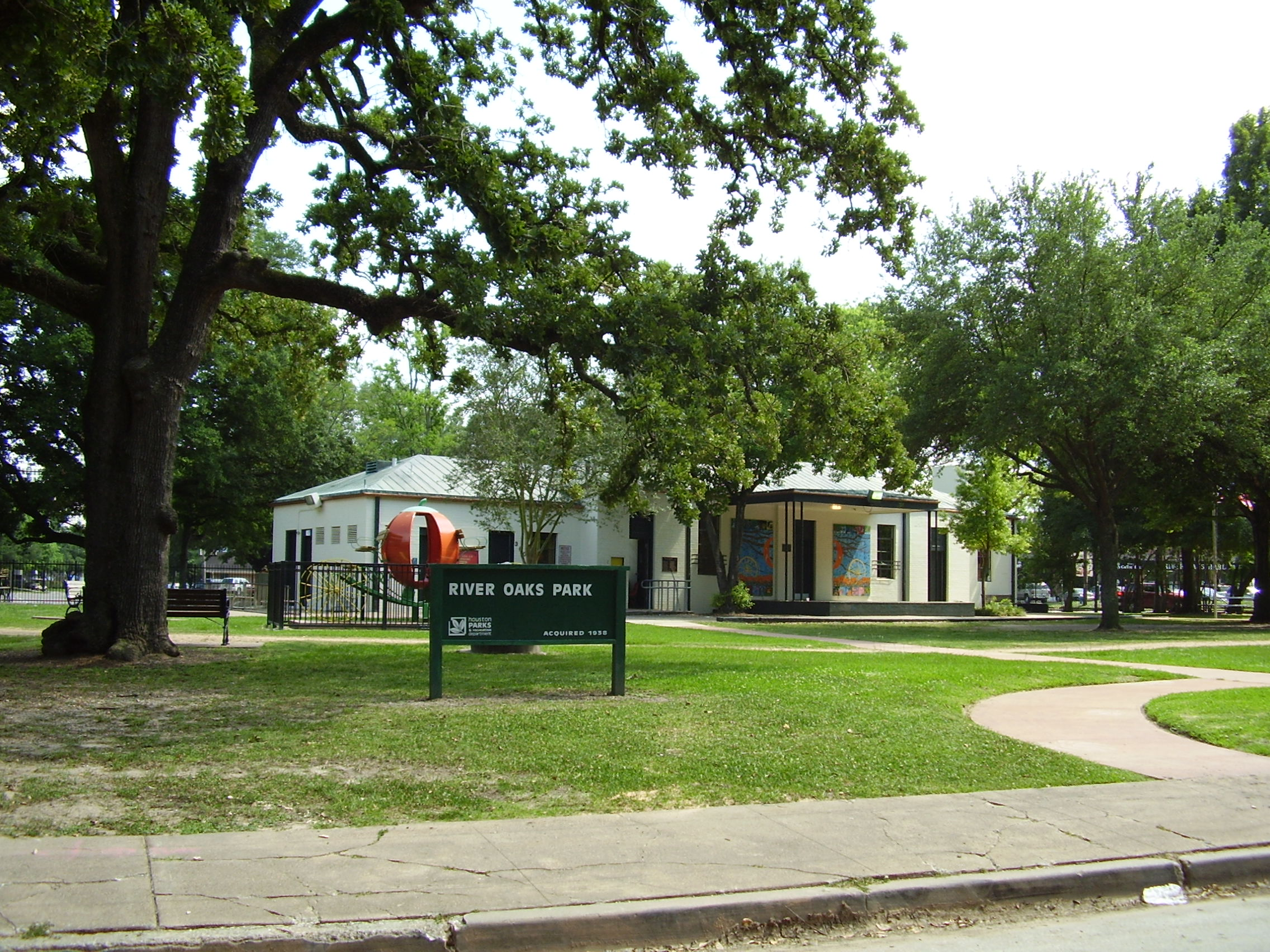
River Oaks Park

Several municipal parks serve River Oaks. River Oaks Park and the River Oaks Community Center, operated by the City of Houston, is one block west of Lamar High School. River Oaks Park includes a .25-mile (0.40 km) off-road trail located within the park's boundaries, tennis courts, a playground, and a lighted sports ground. River Oaks Park includes the Pumpkin Carriage, intended to evoke Cinderella's carriage. Around 2003 Friends of River Oaks Parks had restored the carriage. The Houston Business Journal said "Pumpkin Park provides outstanding resources for neighborhood children – a wonderful playground, community center and the Summer Enrichment Program offering youngsters sports activities and crafts classes."

On June 24, 1999, the River Oaks Property Owners, Inc. entered an agreement with the City of Houston; ROPO agreed to maintain and upgrade parks and esplanades in River Oaks. ROPO also has the right to spend its own funds to improve them. Municipal parks assisted by ROPO include Del Monte Park, Mary Elliot Park, Ella Lee Park, Homewood Park, Kirby Park, Rebecca Meyer Park, Olympia Park, Pine Valley Park, and Sleepy Hollow Park.

== Education ==
=== Primary and secondary schools ===
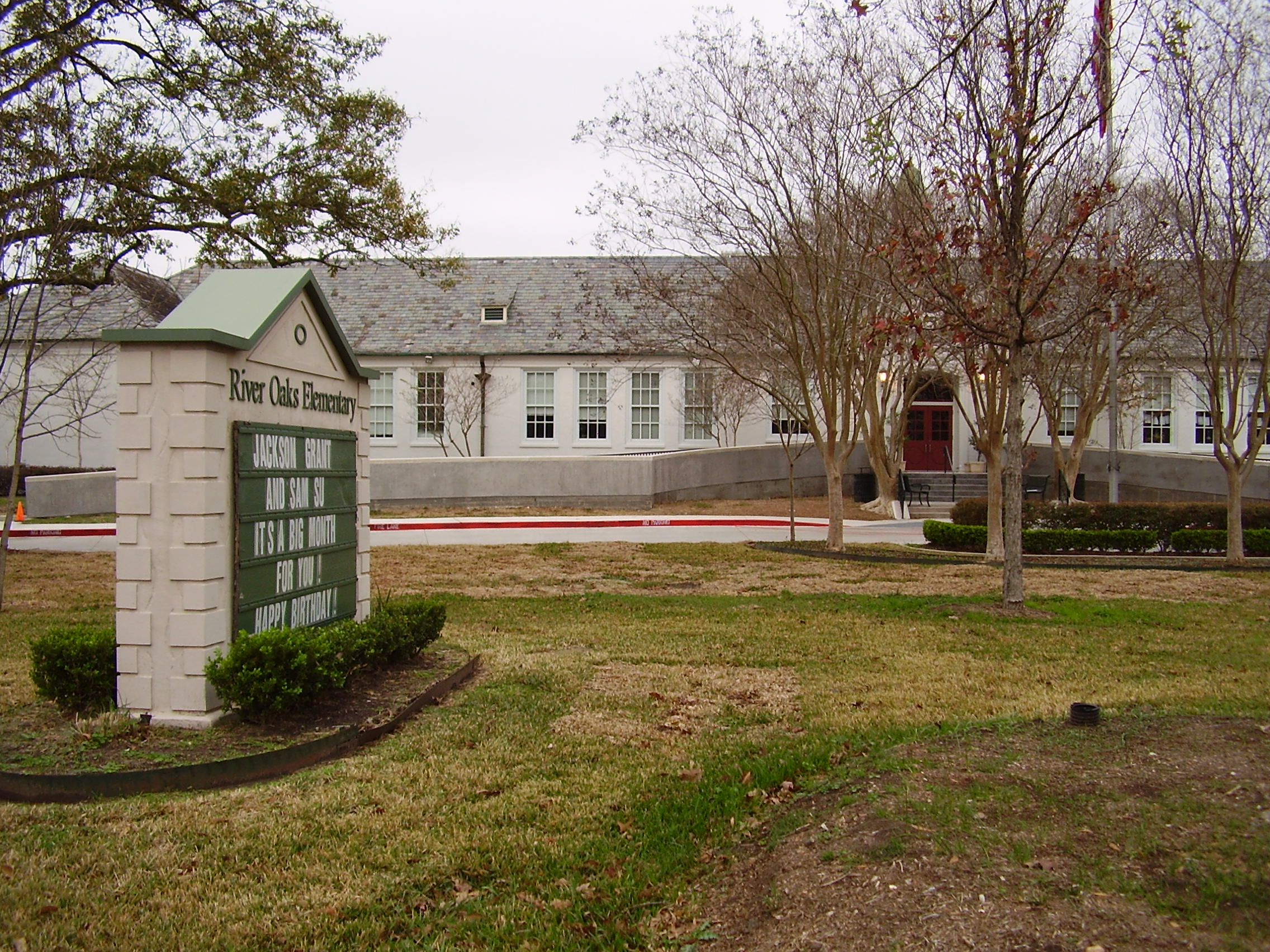
River Oaks Elementary School

The Houston Independent School District (HISD) operates the public schools serving River Oaks. The community is within Trustee District VII. As of 2000, almost 9% of HISD property taxes originated from River Oaks residents.

The attendance boundaries of River Oaks Elementary School, Lanier Middle School, and Lamar High School include River Oaks. Lanier opened in 1926, River Oaks Elementary opened in 1929, and Lamar opened in 1937. As of 2014 there were 517 students in grades Kindergarten through 5 that were zoned to River Oaks Elementary School; that year, according to HISD estimates, about 56% attended River Oaks Elementary, about 41% attended private schools or homeschooling programs, about 2% attended other HISD schools, and about 1% attended public schools in other school districts. Laura Nathan-Garner, author of the second edition of the Insiders' Guide to Houston (2012), wrote that "Many children in [River Oaks] attend [Lamar]".

In 1974 most of River Oaks was assigned to River Oaks Elementary School. Prior to desegregation, it had around 800 children. After desegregation, many parents removed their children from River Oaks Elementary, and the school was far below capacity. In 1986 the neighborhood component of the school closed. At the time River Oaks had mainly older families. At the time the remaining families who did have children had the money to send their children to private school and preferred to do so.

Between 1986 and 1996, River Oaks Elementary School only admitted magnet school students from other areas of the city. The community was divided between the attendance zones of Woodrow Wilson Elementary School (opened in 1925, now Ella Baker Montessori School), the now closed Will Rogers Elementary School (opened in 1950, closed in summer 2006), and Poe Elementary School. By 1995 River Oaks Elementary became one of the most prestigious elementary schools in Houston and had a waiting list. By that year several new families had established themselves in River Oaks and many of them were interested in sending their children to public school. In 1995, several River Oaks parents petitioned HISD to re-establish the neighborhood program at River Oaks Elementary School which allows non-magnet students residing in the school's boundaries to attend. Some magnet parents opposed, believing that the River Oaks program would reduce racial diversity at the school. In 1996, HISD added a neighborhood program to the school for grades Kindergarten through 2nd, with grades 3 through 5 phased in over a subsequent three-year period.

Crockett Early Childhood Center is the closest public early childhood center to River Oaks, while Wilson Elementary School's preschool program is the closest tuition-based program. Only economically disadvantaged students, homeless students, students who are not proficient in English, or children of active-duty members of the U.S. military or whose parent has been killed, injured, or missing in action while on active duty may be enrolled in tuition-free HISD preschools. Students who are eligible for HISD's preschools may attend any Early Childhood Center in Houston ISD for free. Students not eligible may enroll in tuition-based HISD preschool programs.

Several independent (private) schools serve the community. Since the 1970s and by 1995, most of the children in River Oaks were sent to private schools. Catholic schools, operated by the Roman Catholic Archdiocese of Galveston-Houston, include St. Thomas High School (9–12, males only, north of River Oaks along the north edge of the Buffalo Bayou) and St. Anne Catholic School (K-8, south of River Oaks at Shepherd and Westheimer). Other private schools in the area and private schools marketed to River Oaks families include St. John's School (K–12, in Upper Kirby), Annunciation Orthodox School (K-8, in the Neartown area), River Oaks Baptist School (K-8, in River Oaks), Episcopal High School (9–12, Bellaire), The Kinkaid School in (Piney Point Village). In 2006 St. Anne Catholic School received the Blue Ribbon Award.

=== Colleges and universities ===
River Oaks is within the Houston Community College System boundaries. The closest campuses are the Central Campus in Midtown and the West Loop Center. Four-year universities and colleges in close proximity to River Oaks include University of St. Thomas in Montrose and Rice University in the Houston Museum District.

=== Libraries ===
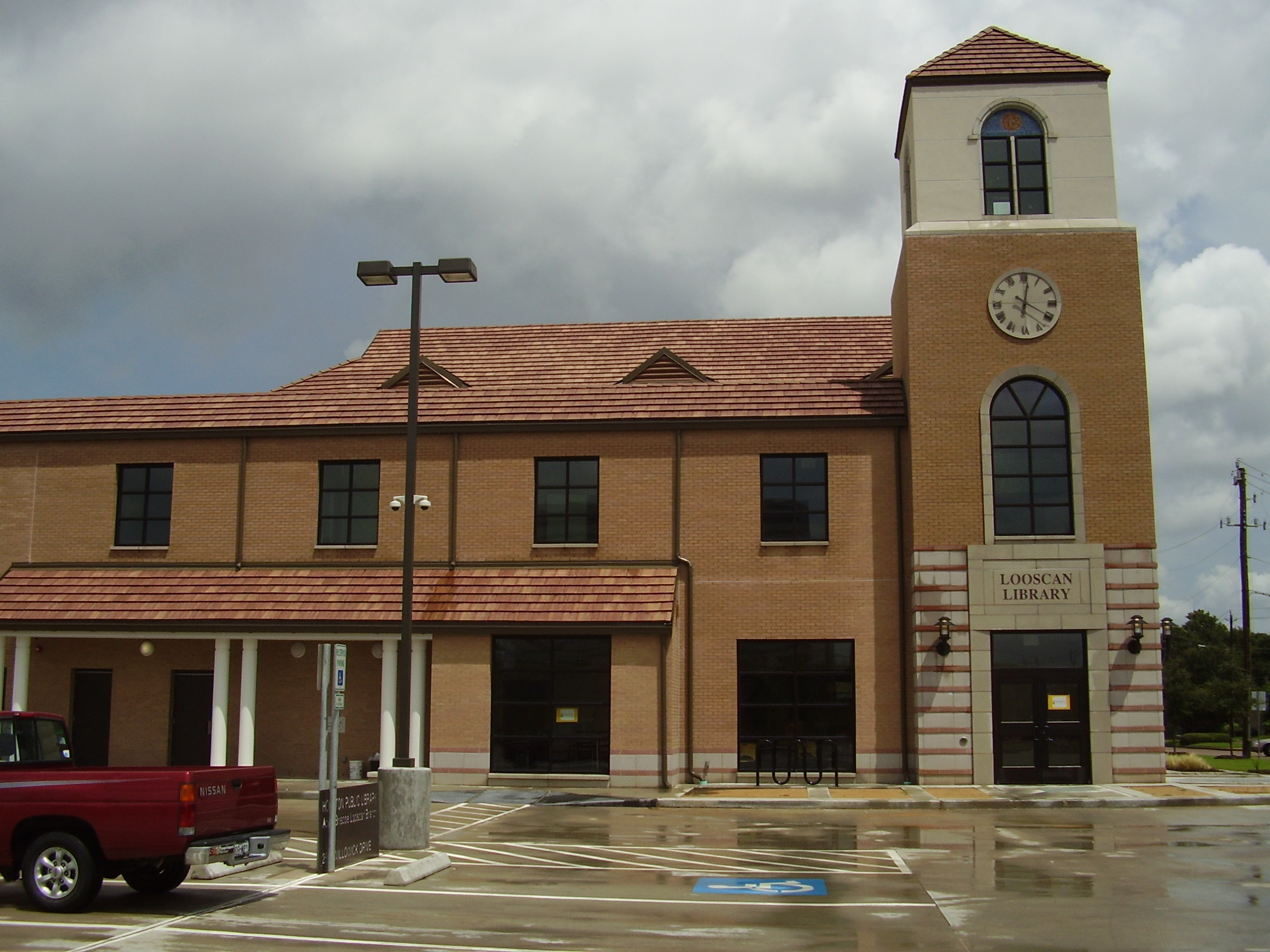
Looscan Library

The community is served by the Adele B. Looscan Branch of Houston Public Library. The current building opened in September 2007. The former library, established in 1956, closed on August 27, 2005, and was demolished in February 2006.

The previous Looscan branch had around 61,000 visitors in the fiscal year 2005. The original plans for Looscan called for the library to get a $5.4 million renovation. An Upper Kirby group proposed a new site near the Upper Kirby YMCA. Around that period the group Friends of Neighborhood Libraries began raising funds. The replacement library, costing $6.2 million, has twice the staff and two and one half times the size of the previous facility. Friends of Neighborhood Libraries raised one million dollars in four months, and around $2.5 million in total to help fund the new library. The 21,000 square feet (2,000 m^{2}) library, designed by Jackson & Ryan Architects, houses over 60,000 books and is the first city LEED-certified facility. It includes a 120-seat multipurpose meeting room and a 14-seat private conference room. The library has several reading areas, including the Marsha Moody Children's Reading Room, a teenager reading area, and a periodical reading area. The exterior was designed to match visual cues of buildings in the surrounding area, such as the River Oaks Baptist Church and School. The Emily Scott and Joseph Wood Evans Clock Tower, a part of the library's exterior, includes a garden book archive and works of art.

=== Gallery of schools ===
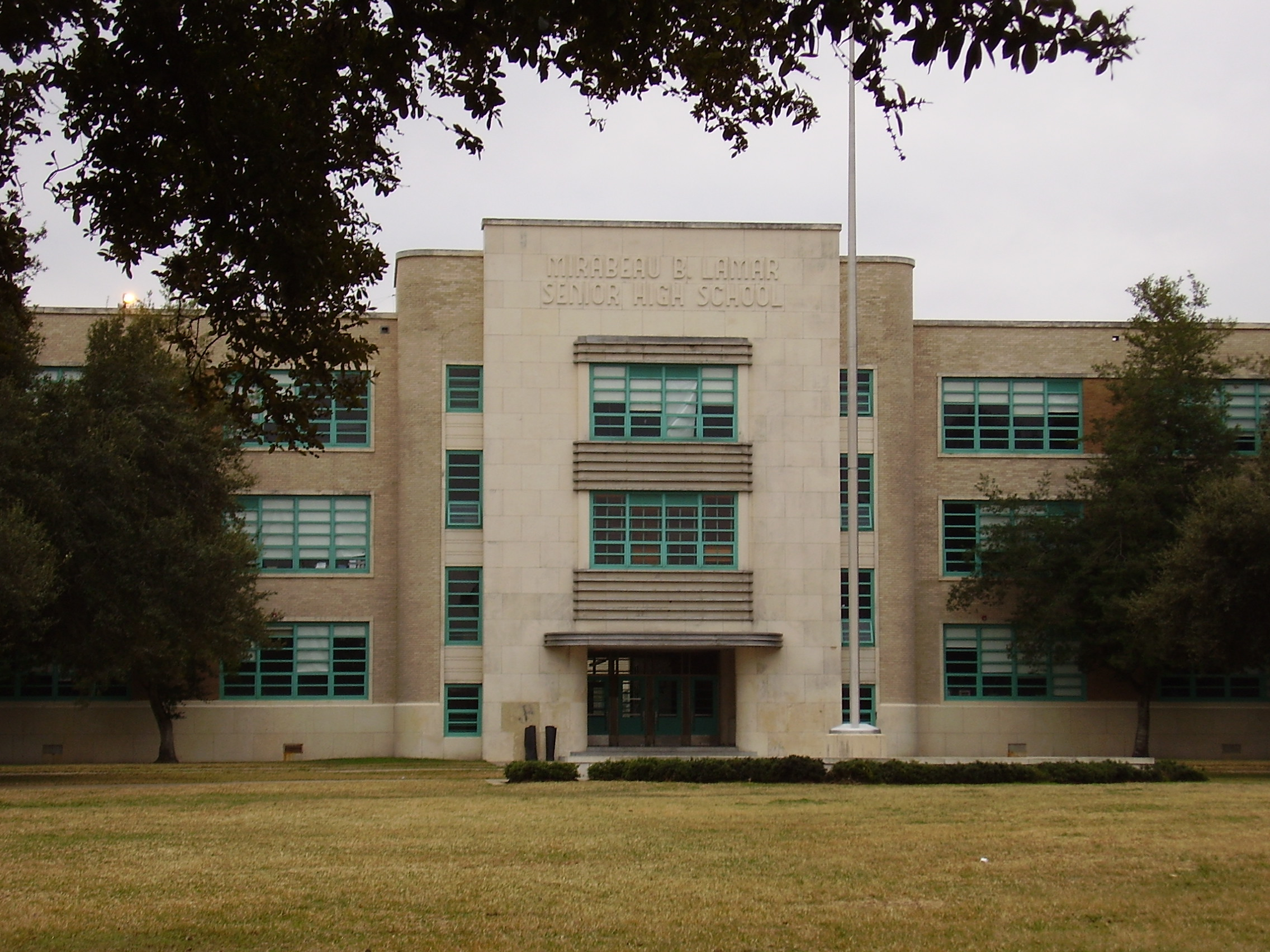
Lamar High School

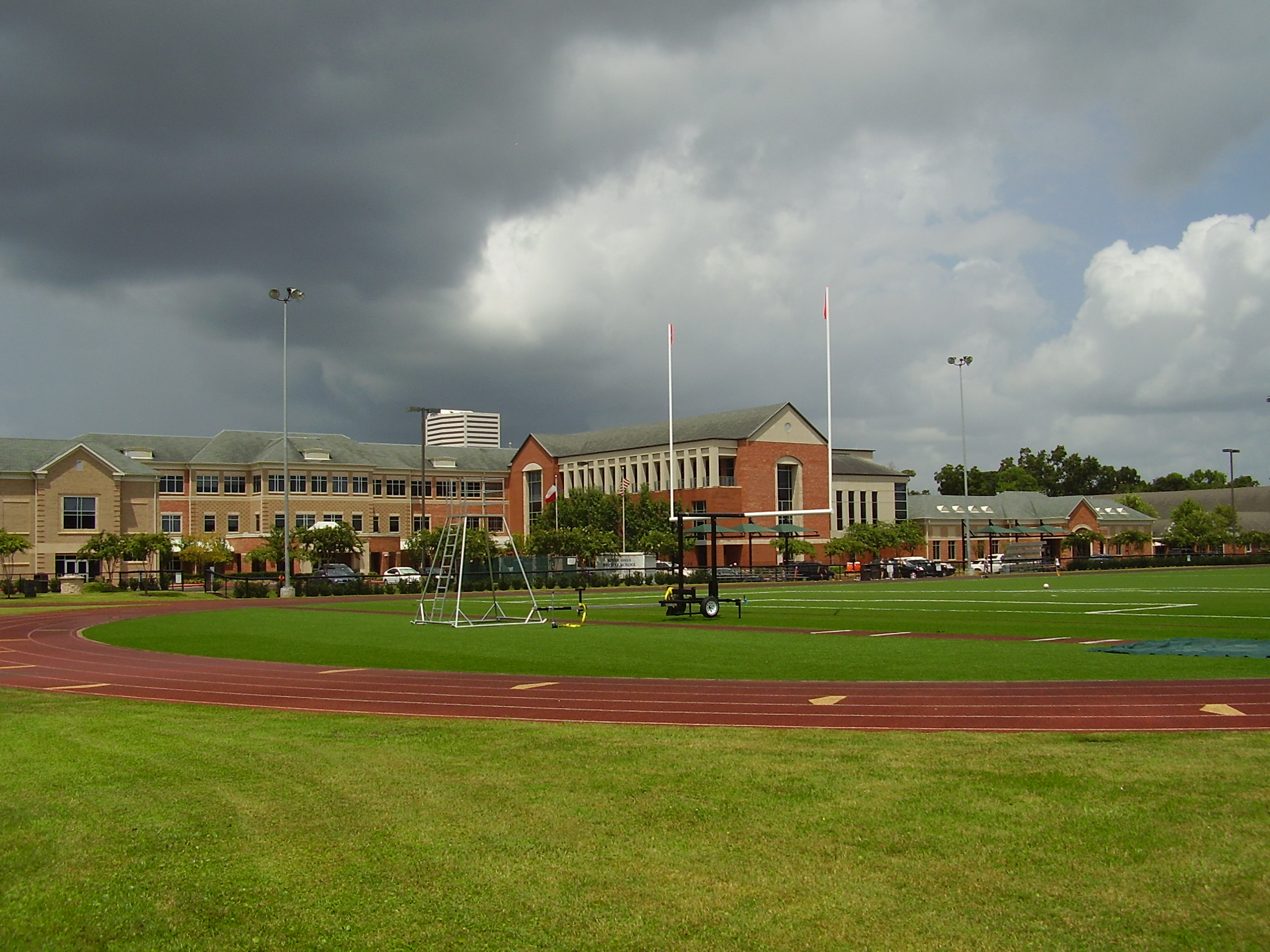
River Oaks Baptist Church and School

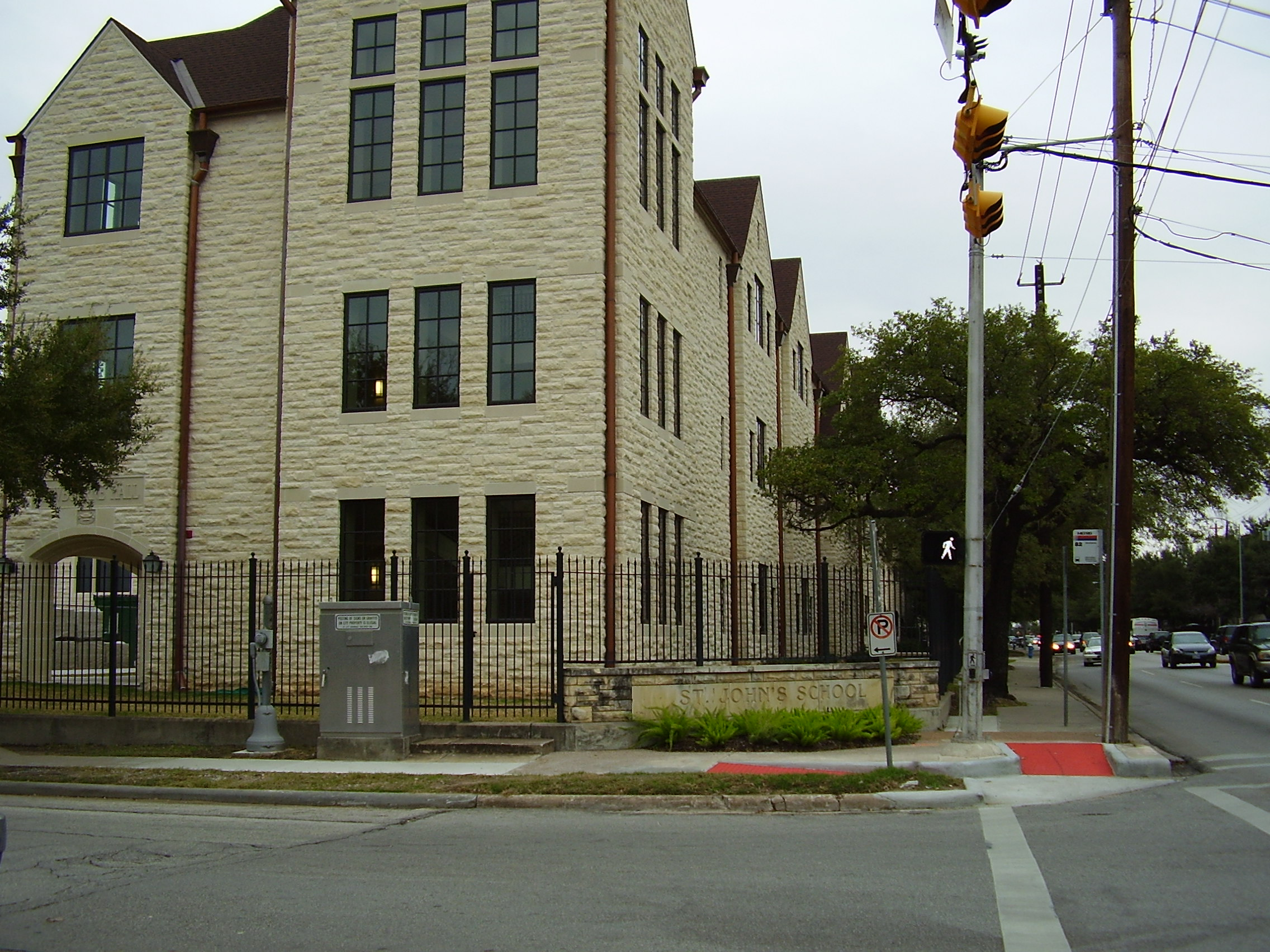
St. John's School Cullen Campus

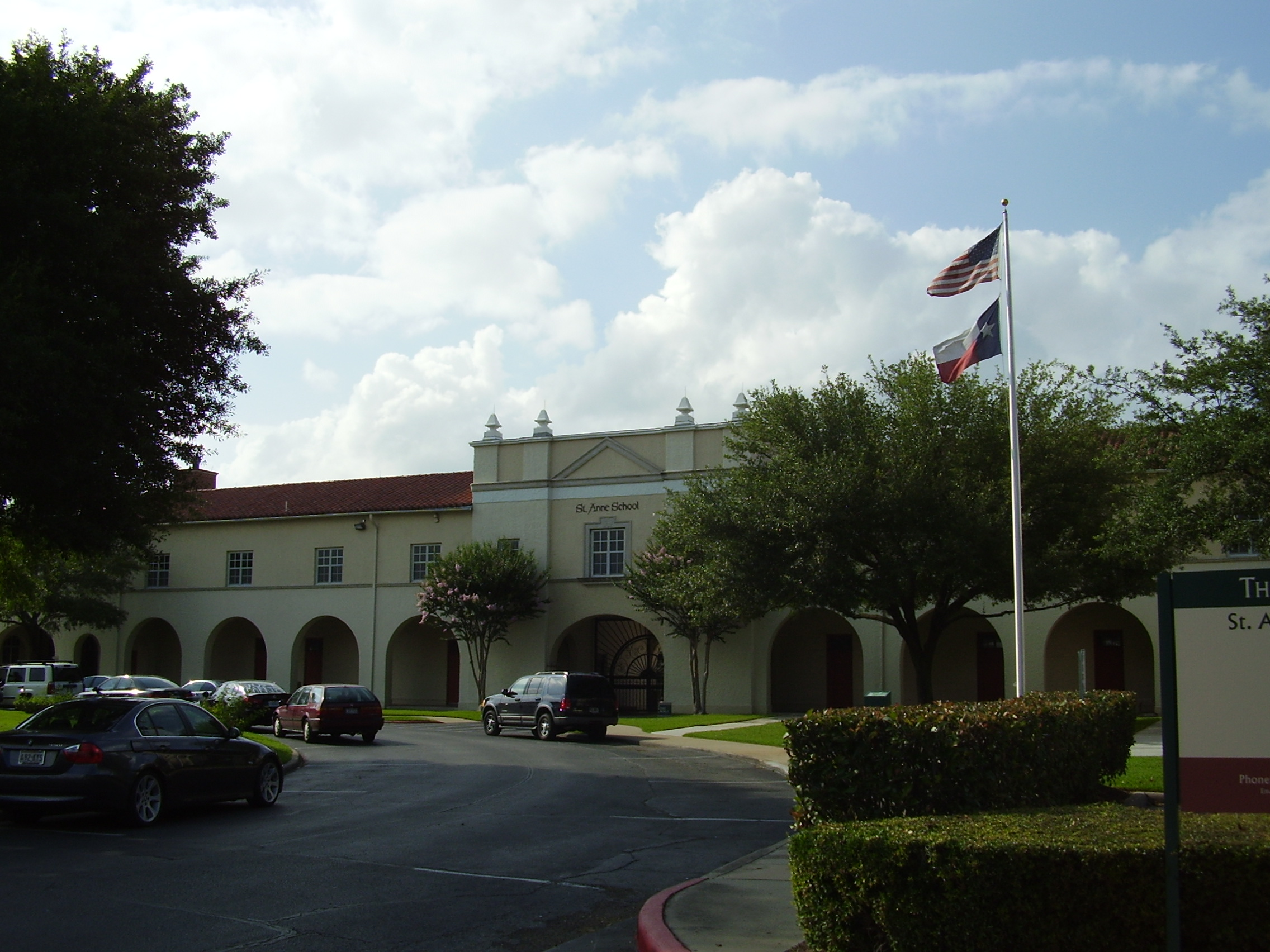
St. Anne Catholic School

== Media ==
The Houston Chronicle is the area's regional newspaper. On Thursdays, residents receive the Bellaire/West U/River Oaks/Meyerland section, which covers events specific to these neighborhoods. The River Oaks Examiner and Village News are local newspapers distributed in the community. The River Oaks Buzz is a monthly magazine mailed free of charge to all residents and focuses on the community.

== Government and infrastructure ==
=== Local government ===
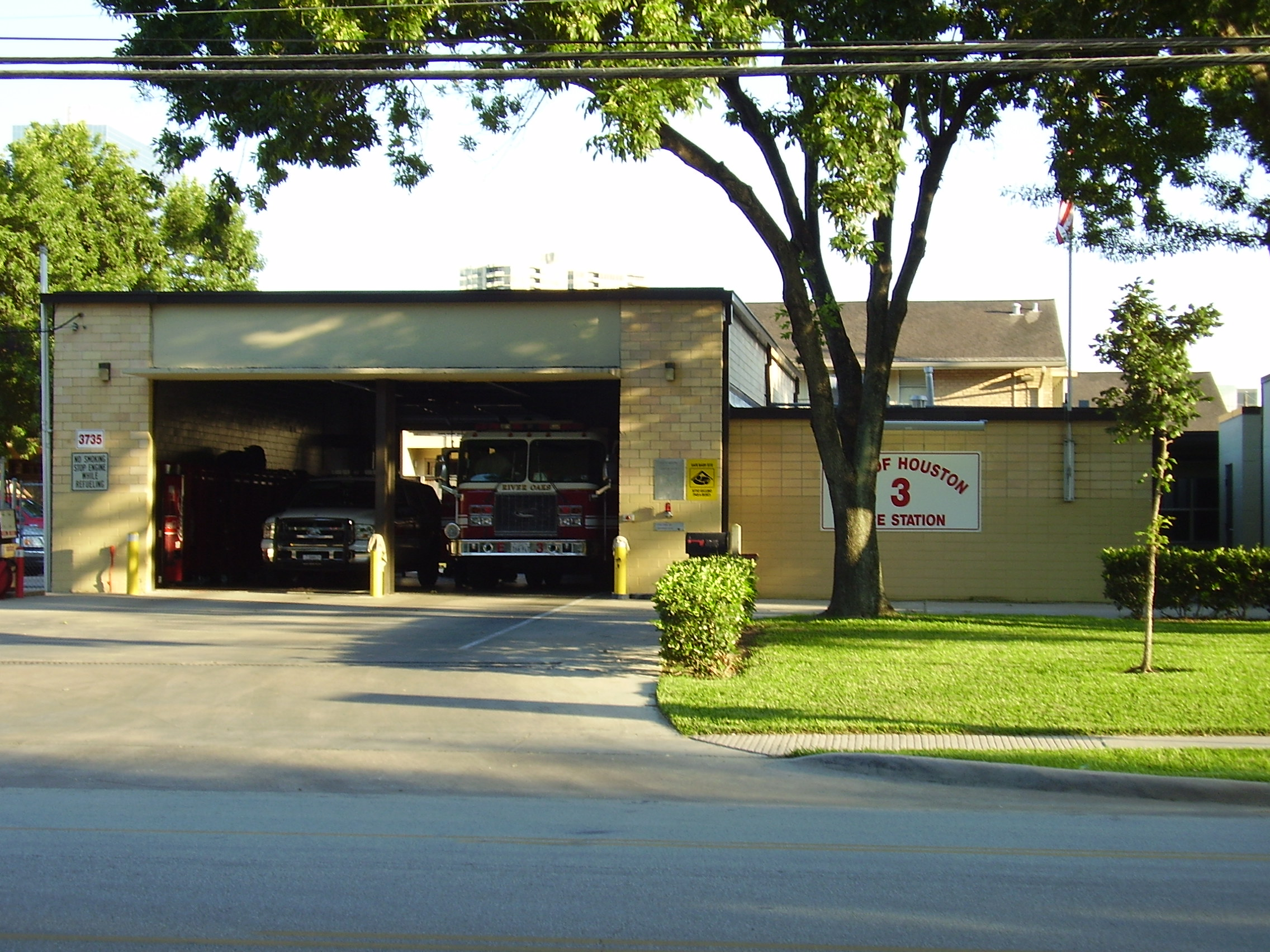
Houston Fire Department Station 3 River Oaks

Houston Fire Department operates Station 3 at 3735 West Alabama at Cummins, near River Oaks. The fire station is in Fire District 28. Station 3 moved to its current location in 1958. The station underwent a renovation in 2003 and 2004 and re-opened in the northern hemisphere spring of 2004. The community is within the Houston Police Department's Central Patrol Division, headquartered at 61 Riesner. River Oaks has one of the lowest crime rates in Houston.

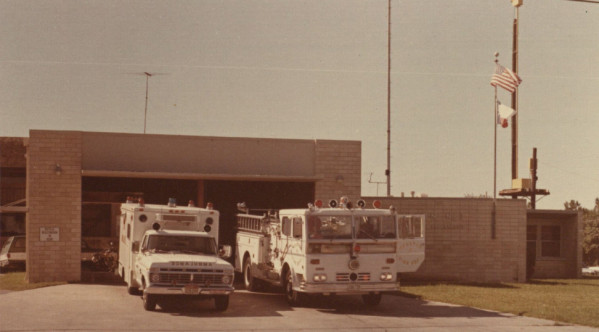
Fire Station 3, 1976

The River Oaks Property Owners, Inc. offices are at 3923 San Felipe Road. The community operates its own private security force, River Oaks Patrol. The Texas Department of Public Safety classifies the force as a guard, alarm, and investigation company. The community is within Super Neighborhood #23 and its recognized council was established on October 15, 2001. Each super neighborhood represents a group of civic clubs, places of worship, businesses, and other institutions and community interests. River Oaks is a part of the Houston City Council District G.

=== County, state, and federal government ===
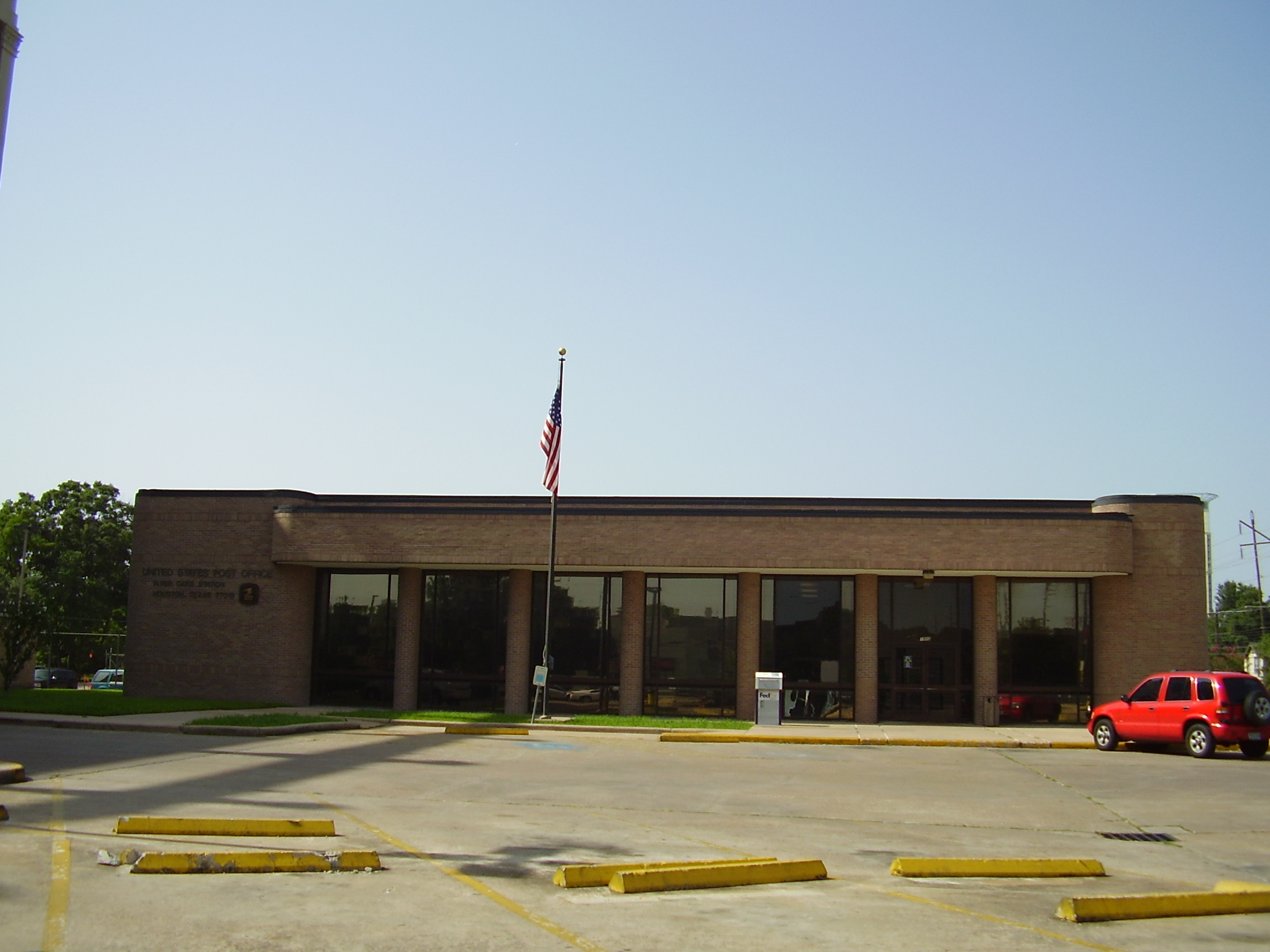
River Oaks Station Post Office, east of River Oaks in Neartown

River Oaks is within Harris County Precinct 4. As of 2020, R. Jack Cagle is the precinct's County Commissioner. River Oaks is in Justice of the Peace/Constable Precinct One. As of 2012 Alan Rosen is the constable.

River Oaks is located in District 134 of the Texas House of Representatives and represented by Ann Johnson, a Democrat. River Oaks is within District 17 of the Texas Senate and represented by Joan Huffman, a Republican.

The community is within Texas's 7th congressional district. As of 2019, the representative is Lizzie Pannill Fletcher. The United States Post Office Service (USPS) operates the River Oaks Post Office at 1900 West Gray Street, supporting the zip codes 77027 and 77019. The post office sits on a 109,160 square feet (10,141 m^{2}) property with a gross building area of 18,100 square feet (1,680 m^{2}). In addition the Julius Melcher Post Office is near River Oaks. In January 2009 the USPS announced that it will put the River Oaks Post Office property up for sale. In October of that year the USPS announced that it, for now, will not sell the River Oaks and Melcher post offices.

Metropolitan Transit Authority of Harris County, Texas (METRO) operates bus services in and around River Oaks. Lines serving River Oaks are the 27 Shepherd, 32 Renwick/San Felipe, 41 Kirby/Polk and 82 Westheimer.

Harris Health System (formerly Harris County Hospital District) designated Casa De Amigos Health Center in Northside for ZIP code 77019 and the Valbona Health Center (formerly People's Health Center) in Greater Sharpstown for ZIP code 77027. The nearest public hospital is Ben Taub General Hospital in the Texas Medical Center.

=== Politics ===
Politicians and political parties conduct fundraising campaigns in River Oaks because it has "six desired qualities" including "allure, location, preening, location, Secret Service familiarity and location." In both 2000 and 2004, River Oaks residents gave $3.9 million to political campaigns. In 2008, they gave $3.4 million to political campaigns through the middle of that year. In 1992 Cynthia Mayer of the Philadelphia Inquirer described River Oaks as one of Houston's "richest, most Republican neighborhoods", and Bennett Roth of the Houston Chronicle also described the area as such in 2008.

== Notable residents ==
- Jim Bath, businessman
- George R. Brown
- Tony Buzbee, attorney
- William Lockhart Clayton, co-founder of Anderson-Clayton Cotton Company
- John Connally, Governor of Texas
- Ted Cruz, Senator for Texas
- Clyde Drexler, professional basketball player
- Dan Duncan, businessman
- Carolyn Farb, philanthropist
- Andrew Fastow and Lea Fastow, primary figure of the Enron scandal and his wife
- Tilman J. Fertitta, businessman and reality TV star
- Thomas Ginn, developer, owner of Ginn Racing and philanthropist.
- Ima Hogg, philanthropist and art collector
- Molly Ivins, journalist, author
- Bob Lanier, former Mayor of Houston
- Khalid bin Mahfouz, Saudi Arabian oil figure
- John W. Mecom Sr., independent oilman
- Robert Mosbacher, businessman and politician
- Carli Mosier, voice actress
- Joel Osteen, pastor of Lakewood Church
- Fayez Sarofim, investor on the Forbes 500
- Jeffrey Skilling, primary figure of the Enron scandal
- Stephen Susman, plaintiffs attorney and founding partner of Susman Godfrey
- Lynn Wyatt, socialite and philanthropist
- Oscar Wyatt, oil baron

== Gallery ==
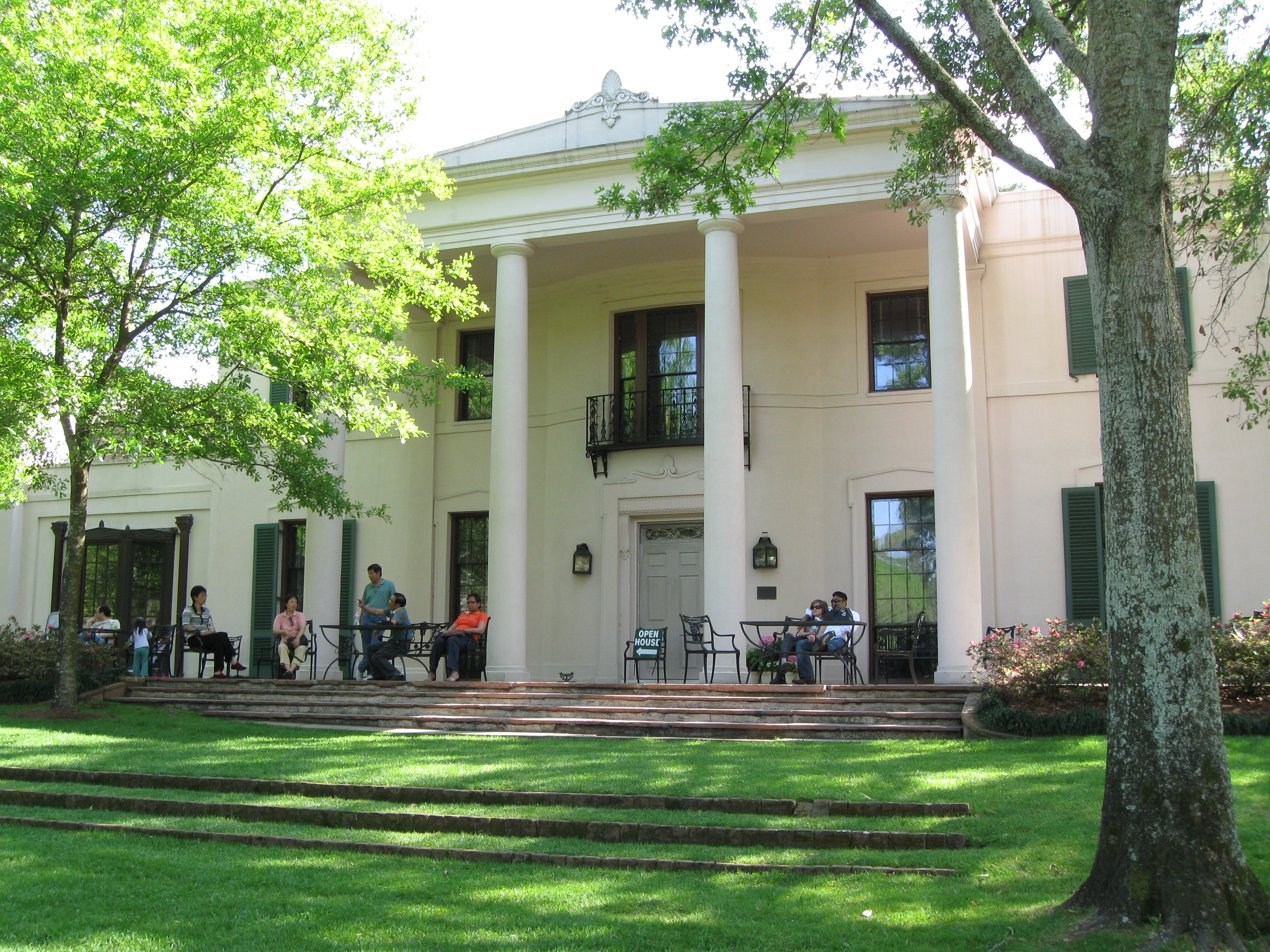
Bayou Bend Collection and Gardens

== See also ==
- History of Houston
- Geographic areas of Houston
- Bayou Bend Collection and Gardens
- Highland Park and River Oaks
