= Highland Park and River Oaks =

2014 book by Cheryl Caldwell Ferguson

Highland Park and River Oaks: The Origins of Garden Suburban Community Planning in Texas
- First edition
- Author: Cheryl Caldwell Ferguson
- Language: English
- Genre: Non-fiction
- Publisher: University of Texas Press
- Publication date: 2014
- Publication place: United States

Highland Park and River Oaks: The Origins of Garden Suburban Community Planning in Texas is a 2014 book by Cheryl Caldwell Ferguson, published by the University of Texas Press. It discusses the development of two "garden suburbs" in Texas, the River Oaks neighborhood in Houston and the Dallas–Fort Worth municipality of Highland Park, during the 1920s.

== Background ==
The author, an independent scholar, is a resident of Austin, Texas. She also coauthored Buildings of Texas: Central, South, and Gulf Coast.

Primary sources used as references include advertisements, archives, clip files, correspondence between the developers, drawings and plans, historical society collections, magazine articles, neighborhood newsletters, newspaper articles, pamphlets, photographs, records from city governments.

== Contents ==
The book begins with a discussion of preceding developments in Texas. Three chapters of the book discuss River Oaks and Highland Park, including the original section and Highland Park West; this makes up over 50% of the book. The book ends by discussing subsequent developments.

In regards to River Oaks and Highland Park the book discusses how the developers priced the lots, targeted buyers, and opened suburbs in phases. Some of that information originated from the Conference of Developers of High-Class Residential Property records. The book also discusses the infrastructure costs of the developments. The book notes include biographies of key individuals related to Highland Park and River Oaks. In the final chapter the author stated that the developments historically prevented African-Americans and Hispanics and Latinos from living there and therefore had a higher social status. She also stated that both Highland Park and River Oaks had become very wealthy areas even though in the 1920s they may have been considered middle class.

Ferguson sometimes discusses other similar developments in the United States; Mary Corbin Sies of the University of Maryland stated that this was a "good feature" of Highland Park and River Oaks although at times at times they "are sometimes described without indicating how they help us contextualize" the two developments that are the main topic of the book. The communities that preceded Highland Park and River Oaks that are discussed include six communities in Houston: Broadacres, Courtlandt Place, Forest Hill, Houston Heights, and Westmoreland; as well as five communities in Dallas: East Dallas, Munger Place, Oak Cliff, Oak Lawn, and Philadelphia Place.

According to the book some elements of the city planning used in Highland Park and River Oaks had an influence on subsequent developments while others did not. The book specifically documented these areas in the section "Texas influence and permanence". It discusses two communities in Amarillo, Wolflin Estates and Wolflin Place; the Mills Place community in Corsicana; two places in Fort Worth: River Crest and Ryan Place, as well as nearby Westover Hills; Olmos Park in the San Antonio metropolitan area; and two places in Wichita Falls: Country Club Estates and Morningside Park Additions.

Ferguson uses primary sources including advertisements, architectural drawings, deed restrictions, and planning documents to demonstrate the national trends. The book includes color, sepiatone and black and white photographs, along with maps and planning illustrations. In some cases the author had to use reproductions of images since she was unable to obtain the originals; as a consequence, according to Sies, some images of floor plans and maps are difficult to read and some images are small in size.

== Reception ==
Harold Henderson of Planning wrote that the illustrations and maps were "superb".

Robert E. Krause of the Maryland-National Capital Park and Planning Commission praised the text for balancing the prose on individual houses within the developments and the prose on the overall development of the neighborhoods, and the illustrations for being "lovely"; Krause praised the author "for not only her research, but for creating a work widely applicable to subject experts, students, and the general public." Krause argued that the book should have included a discussion on the controversy behind the demolitions of certain houses and contemporary maps.

Sies wrote that the author "contributes substantially to scholars' understanding of the planning processes of affluent suburbs." Sies argued that the book should have included a picture of a typical streetscape of Highland Park and River Oaks instead of primarily illustrating the most "grand" houses; that there is too much emphasis on Spanish architecture even though the book itself stated that architects were not very concerned with the specific housing styles chosen and instead, in Sies's words, "focused on crafting livable houses"; and that there are "idiosyncratic and hard-to-follow" descriptions of architecture.
