= River Oaks Garden Club Forum of Civics =

- River Oaks Garden Club Forum of Civics (Forum of Civics)
- U.S. National Register of Historic Places
- Recorded Texas Historic Landmark
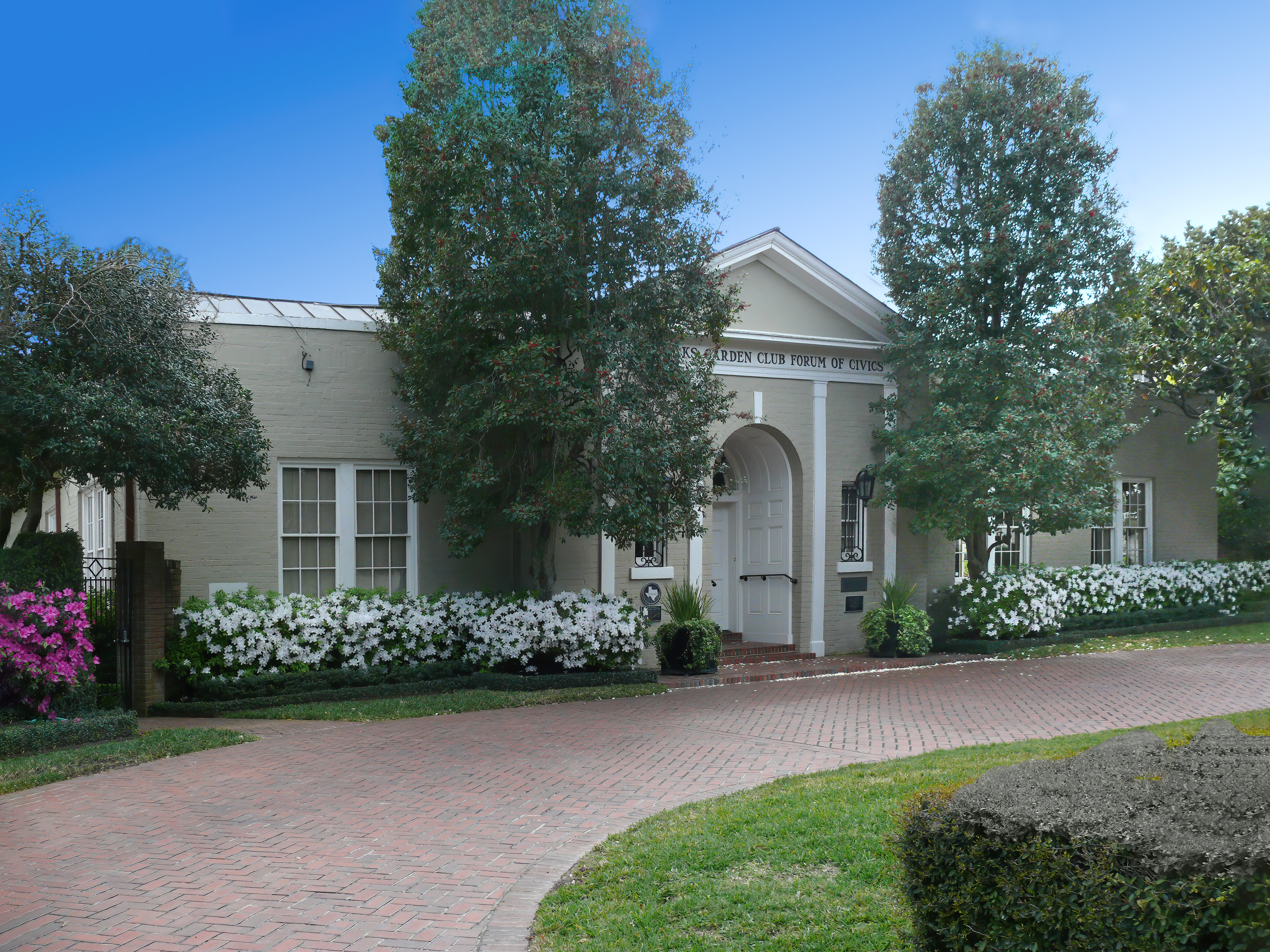
- River Oaks Garden Club Forum of Civics

- Location within Texas Location within the United States
- Location: 2503 Westheimer Road @ Main Street; Houston, Texas; United States
- Coordinates: 29.7420°N 95.4179°W
- Area: 1.5 acres (0.61 ha)
- Built: 1910
- Architect: Staub, John F.
- Architectural style: Classical Revival
- NRHP reference No.: 88001053
- RTHL No.: 10667

Significant dates
- Added to NRHP: October 13, 1988
- Designated RTHL: 1964

River Oaks Garden Club Forum of Civics is a building at 2503 Westheimer Road in Houston, Texas, United States listed in the National Register of Historic Places as the "Forum of Civics."

The building is located south of the River Oaks neighborhood in the Upper Kirby district.

== History ==
Built in 1910, the building, known as John Smith County School, served as a county schoolhouse. John F. Staub remodeled the building to serve as the headquarters of the Forum of Civics, an organization founded by Will Hogg. In 1939 the Hogg estate bequeathed the Forum of Civics to the University of Texas. River Oaks Garden Club has owned the building since 1942. The building received listing in the National Register of Historic Places on October 13, 1988.

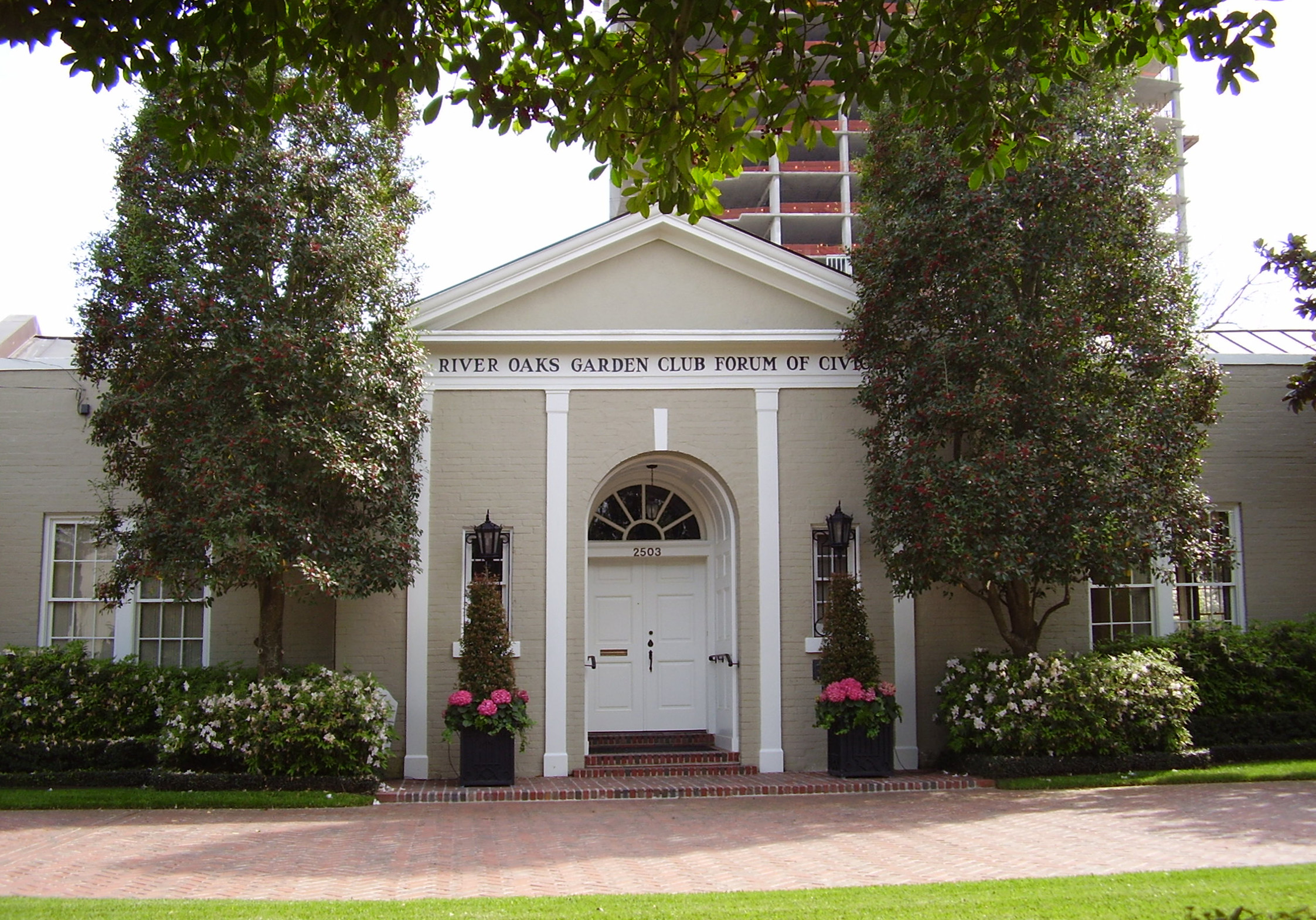
Forum of Civics of River Oaks Garden Club

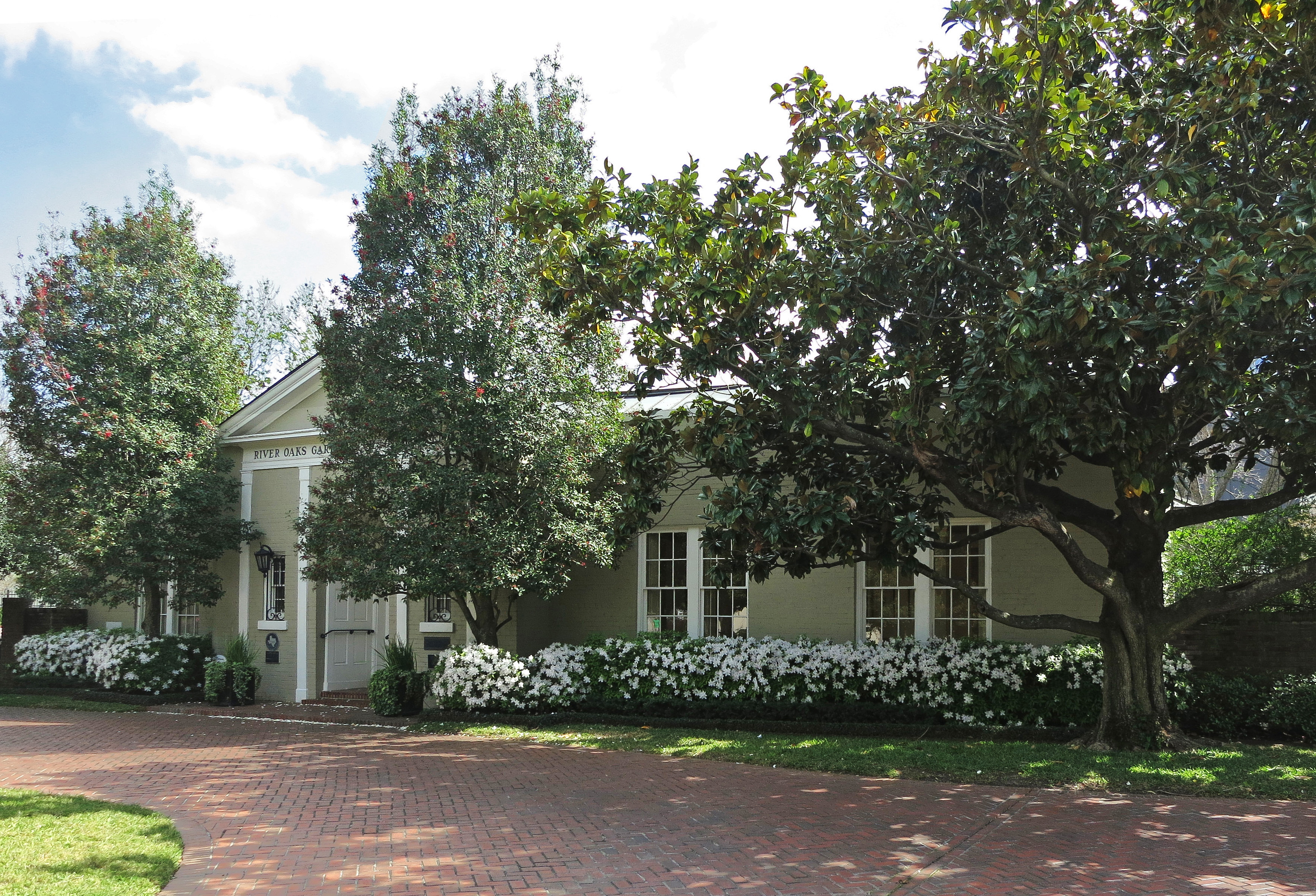
Forum of Civics of River Oaks Garden Club, Houston

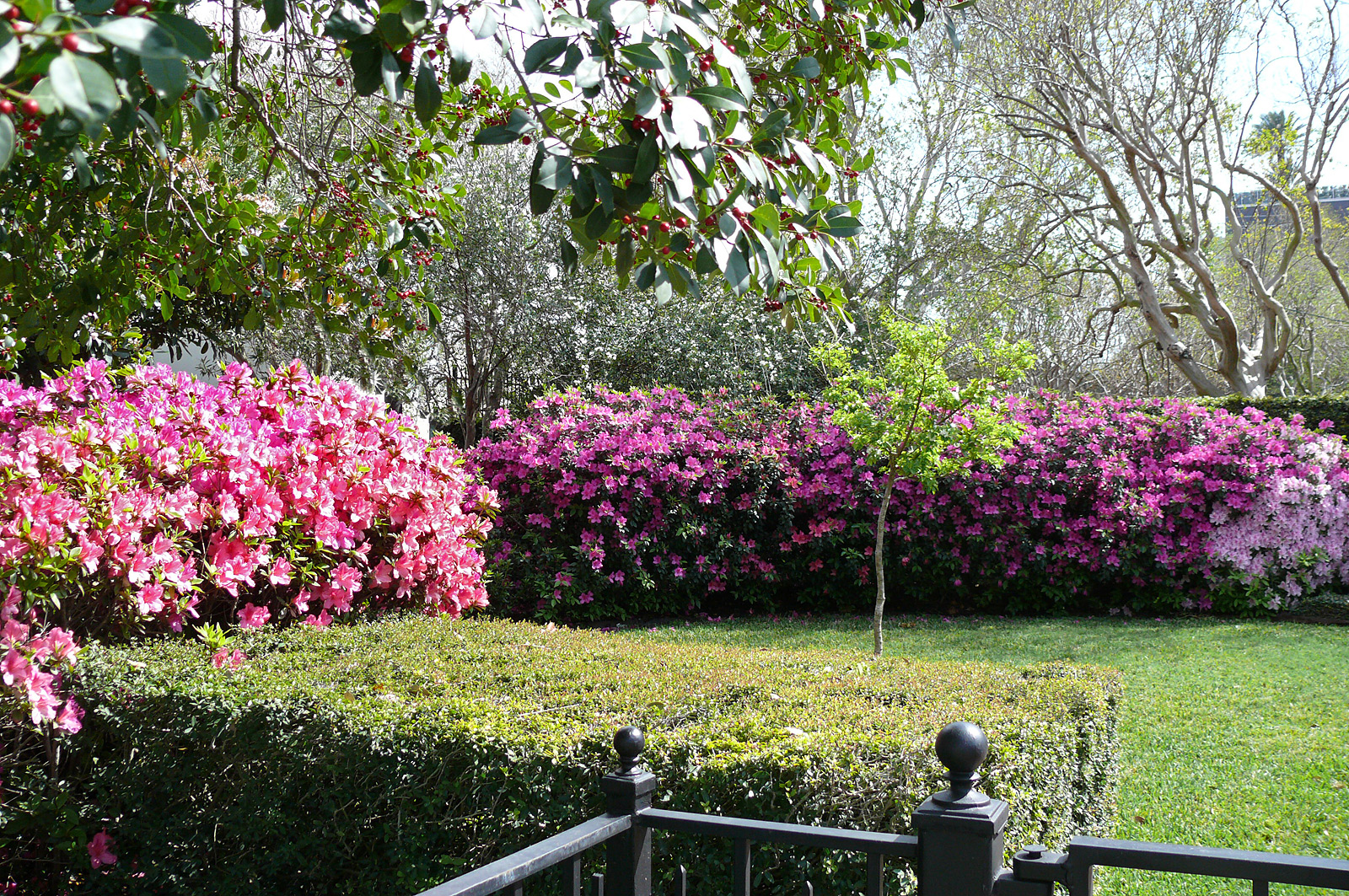
Azaleas at Houston's River Oaks Garden Club. The Club sponsors Houston's renowned "Azalea Trail"

== See also ==
- River Oaks, Houston
