= River Oaks Theatre =

Historic movie theater in Houston, Texas, United States

Coordinates: 29.7528°N 95.4091°W

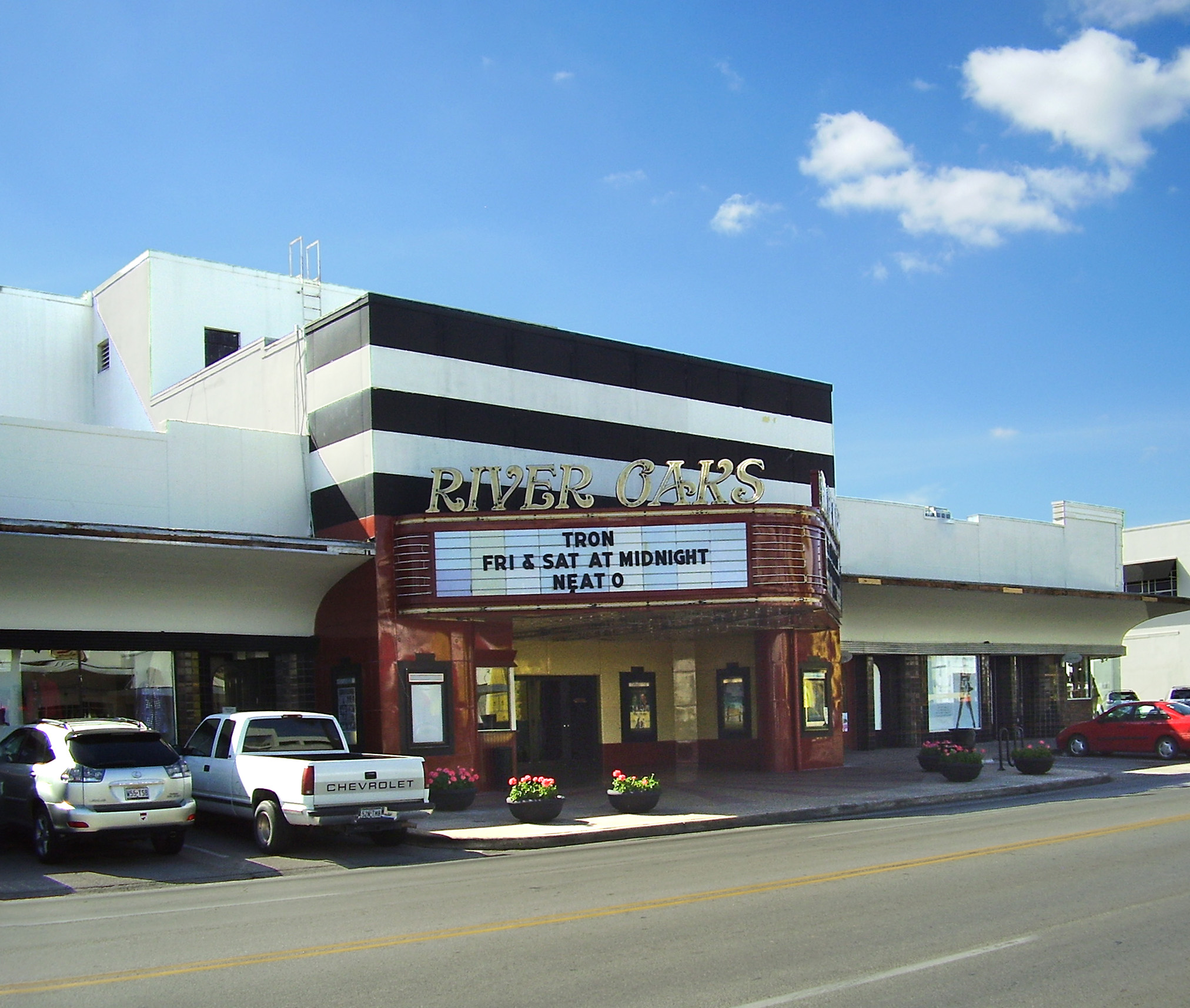
The River Oaks Theatre

The River Oaks Theatre is a historic movie theater located in the River Oaks Shopping Center in the Neartown community in Houston, Texas, United States, east of the River Oaks community. The theater has three projection screens; one large screen, downstairs, and two smaller screens, upstairs.

== History ==
The River Oaks Theatre was built in 1939. It was an example of late-1930s Art Deco design. It was the last of the deluxe neighborhood movie theaters built by Interstate Theatre Corporation.

The theater opened on November 28, 1939. Paul Scott had the lease to the theater. Its first film was Bachelor Mother. In February 1947 Interstate Theaters acquired the River Oaks Theatre. In late 1975 the chain Trans-Continental took control from Interstate. The New Mexico chain Movie, Inc. took control of the River Oaks Theatre in 1977. The theater's focus changed from first-run films to alternative films such as re-released films, and classic, foreign, cult, and old films. Movie, Inc. later merged with Landmark Theatre Company.

Since 1976, the theater was operated by Landmark Theatres and generally showed foreign language and independent films, as well as other "art-house" movies. The theater re-opened on March 26, 1977.

On September 9, 1982, there was a screening of Salo at the theater; this was the third showing in a three-year period. Vice squad officers waited for the screening to conclude and arrested the manager in a raid. The authorities charged him with promoting obscene material but a jury acquitted the manager in an April 1983 trial.

During a January 1983 screening of Fire on the Water there was a dueling protest between Ku Klux Klan and anti-Klan groups. After the release of the 1985 film Hail Mary there were protests from church groups.

The theater's focus went back to first run films by the mid-1980s due to an increase in video VHS releases and cable. In the mid-1980s the theater owners spent $400,000 on renovation. They removed a group of seats from the downstairs auditorium so a projector could be installed. The seating capacity was changed to 546 seats. The owners changed the balcony into two 125-seat each mini-theaters. The 1939-era carbon-arc projectors were replaced with platter-system projectors. The balcony screens received an ultrastereo sound system, while Dolby was used for the downstairs screens. The theater owners installed a café in the upstairs area and elevators. New paint in gray and blue was applied to the interior. On May 15, 1986, the renovated theater re-opened. October 5, 2012 the theatre showed its final movie on 35mm film, The Master, before being upgraded to 100% digital projection.

In December 1996 premiere of the film The Evening Star was held here.

The theater was in the River Oaks Shopping Center, on the eastern edge of the prestigious River Oaks subdivision.

In December 2018, Landmark was acquired by Cohen Media Group, changing the theater's ownership.

== Honors and awards ==
The theater received the following awards:

- On March 26, 2000, it was officially proclaimed "River Oaks Theatre Day" by Mayor Lee P. Brown
- Presented an award for the "Preservation of a Landmark Facility as a Unique and Special Venue for Art, Vintage and Independently Produced Films" (2001) by the Museum District Alliance
- Declared "Best Movie Theatre" (2001) by Inside Houston
- Declared "Best Movie Theatre" (2003) by the Houston Press
- Listed as one of the "20 Cool Things About Houston" (2006) by the Houston Chronicle
- November 6, 2006, was officially proclaimed "River Oaks Theatre Day" by Mayor Bill White
- On April 19, 2007, the globally popular internet show, Pure Pwnage, screened its newest episode at the River Oaks Theatre, before the internet release
- Listed on the National Register of Historic Places (October 25, 2024)

== The Rocky Horror Picture Show ==
The River Oaks Theatre carried on the tradition of showing The Rocky Horror Picture Show at midnight, on the second Saturday of every month, complete with the "Royal Mystic Order of Chaos" shadow cast.

== Closing ==
After rumors circulated that the theater would close, on August 30, 2006, Carolyn Farb announced that she would make an effort to preserve the theatre. She stood in front of the theater with a group of supporters. All wore shirts reading "Save Our Shrines" in black.

In 2006, due to the controversy, the Houston Press ranked Weingarten the "Turkey Landlord of the Year".

On February 25, 2021, the Houston Chronicle reported that the theatre's lease was set to expire on March 31, 2021, and that negotiations with Weingarten Realty, the theatre's landlord, were ongoing. On March 12, 2021, Houston CBS affiliate KHOU reported that Landmark Theatres had not reached a deal with Weingarten Realty.

There were protests on March 1, and March 7.

On March 15 Landmark announced that it will be forced to close the theater due to Weingarten not responding to its proposals.

It closed on March 25, 2021. The final film screened was Nomadland. It was the sole remaining traditional cinema in the city.

== Reopening ==
In 2022, Culinary Khancepts, an affiliate of Star Cinema Grill, announced it would be the new tenant and reopen the theater in 2024, following extension renovations. The theater officially reopened on October 3, 2024.
