= River Oaks Baptist School =

Private school in Texas, United States

Coordinates: 29.744889°N 95.442979°W

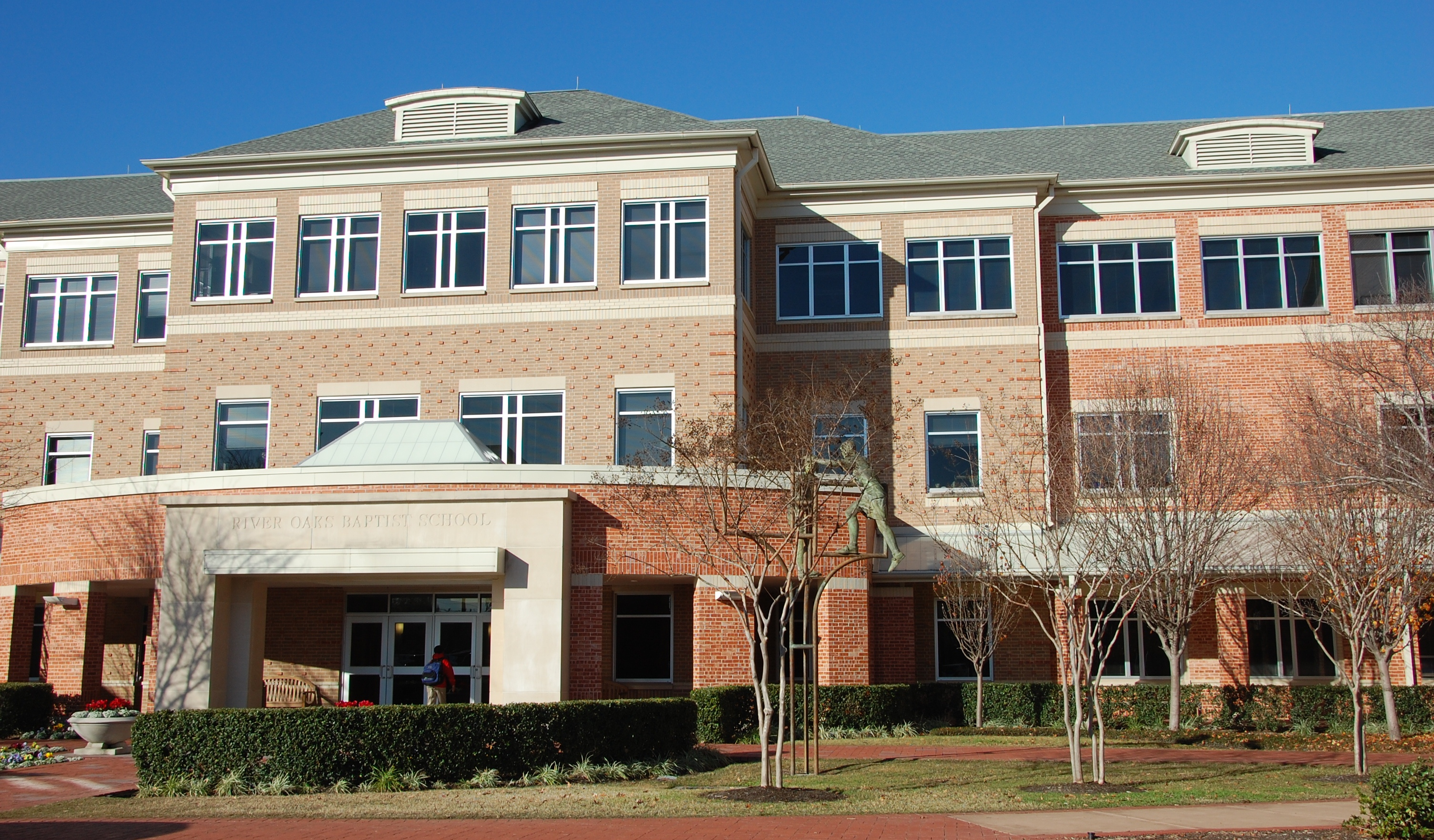
The entrance to the building with a statue of children symbolizing the future

River Oaks Baptist School is a private, Christian, co-educational day school for students in preschool, lower school and middle school located in Houston, Texas.

== Location ==
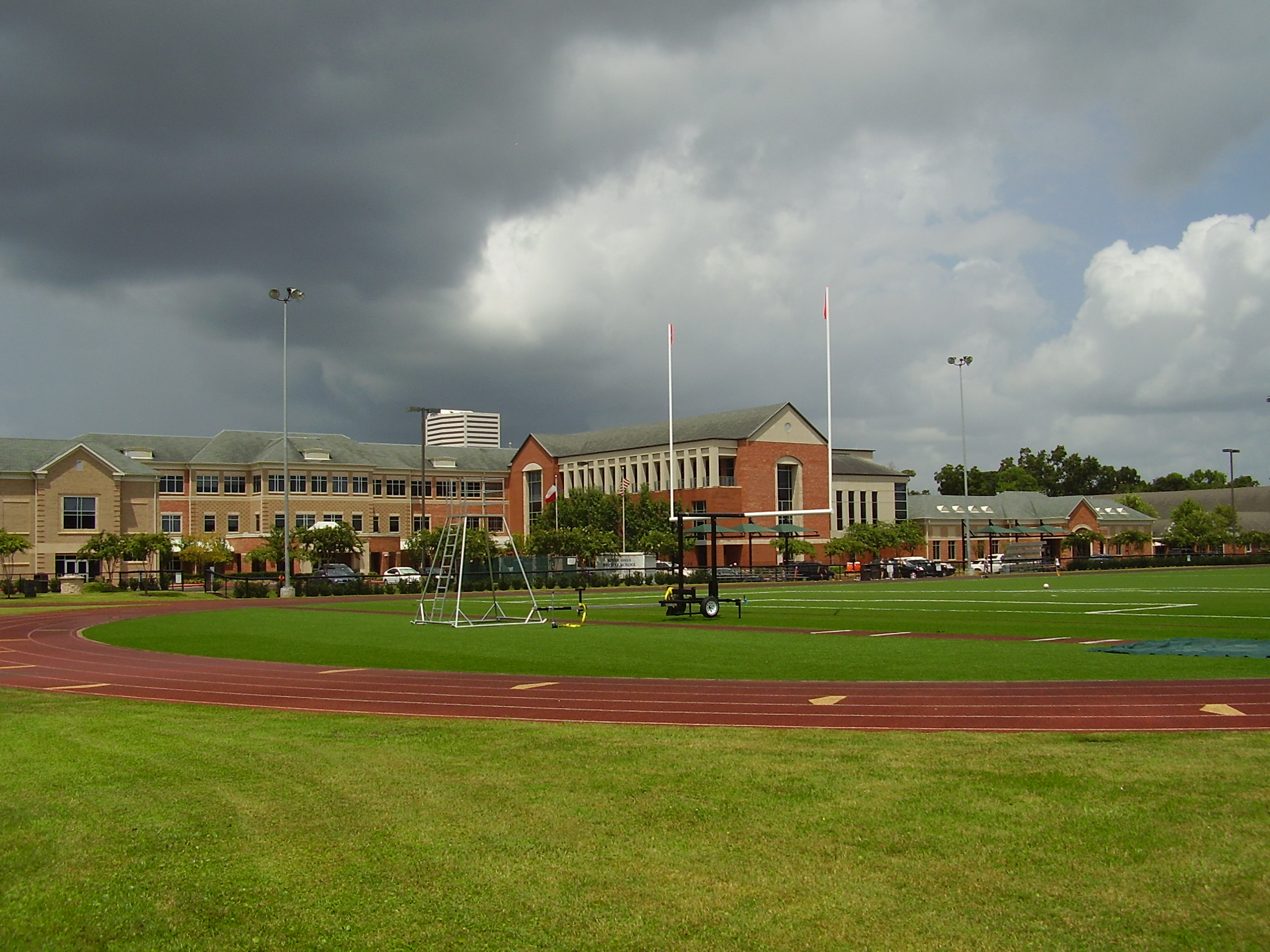
River Oaks Baptist School

ROBS is located on the property of River Oaks Baptist Church, between the Oak Estates and Royden Oaks neighborhoods, in proximity to River Oaks.

== History ==
River Oaks Baptist School was founded by River Oaks Baptist Church in 1955. The School began as a weekly preschool and kindergarten, with two teachers and 30 students. Demand for more classes prompted the gradual expansion of the School. In 1979, the School celebrated the graduation of its first eighth grade class. In 1980, with 527 students in Preschool, Lower School, and Middle School, the significant enlargement of the School's campus began. The campus master plan was completed in 2006, and the School now serves approximately 850 students from age two to eighth grade.

== Library ==
The 9,000 square feet (840 m^{2}) ROBS school library opened was built in 1997. It includes an open area that functions as a storytelling space and an area for school receptions. The library also houses a large central reading room, an after-school study area, the office of the head librarian, a work area for other library employees, and a work area for volunteers.

== See also ==
- Christianity in Houston
