= River Oaks Shopping Center =

Shopping center in Houston, Texas

Coordinates: 29.753°N 95.409°W

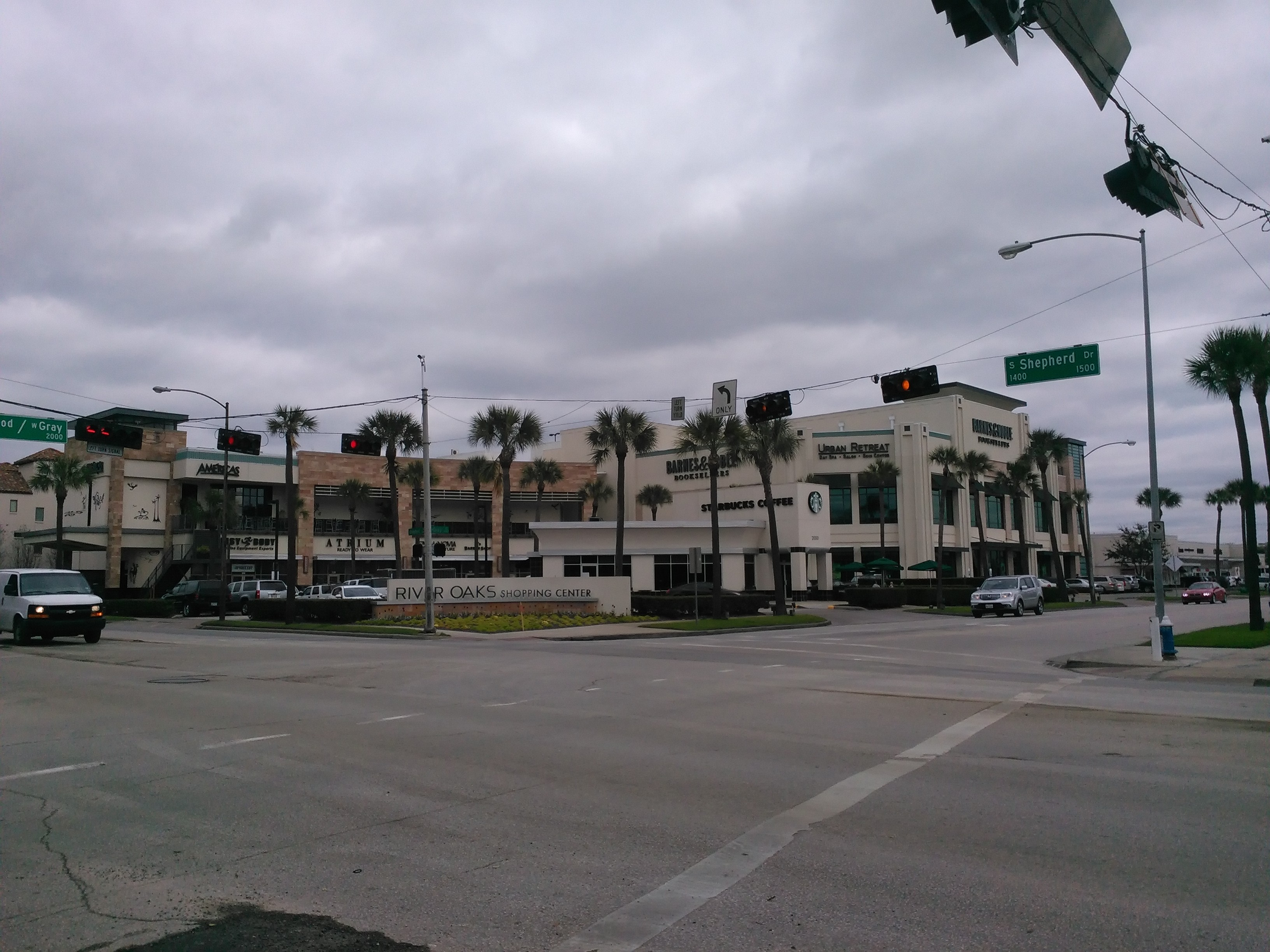
River Oaks Shopping Center

The River Oaks Shopping Center is a shopping center in Neartown, Houston, adjacent to River Oaks. As of 2012 the more than 322,000-square-foot (29,900 m^{2}) center includes one grocery store, one movie theater, 14 restaurants, and 76 stores. The center, owned by Weingarten Realty, is the third oldest shopping center of its type in the United States.

== History ==
Hugh Potter, who was involved in the River Oaks Corporation and took control of it in the 1930s, had created the concept of the shopping center. Potter originally planned to place the center at the intersection of River Oaks Boulevard and Westheimer Road where St. John the Divine Church was built, but in 1930 he changed the location to where it would be ultimately built. The preliminary studies began in 1932.

Potter commissioned architects Edward Arrantz and Oliver C. Winston to create the plans for the study. Arrantz died, so he was replaced by Stanton Nunn. Winston was later hired by the Public Works Administration to be the housing division project planner. In the early fall of 1936, H. G. Frost committed to financing the center. Potter asked Winston to finish the process, so Winston took one month of leave of absence from his job with the federal government. The designs, produced by the architecture firm Nunn & McGinty, were finalized in 1937. The first stores at the River Oaks Shopping Center opened in November 1937. Anna Mod, author of Building Modern Houston, wrote "The center was the subject of numerous articles" when it opened.

In 1971 Weingarten Realty bought the center. In 1975 Weingarten made its first renovation.

In 2008 area residents began complaining upon learning about a plan to install an open-air wine bar/patio for private parties. Tony Vallone, who planned to establish the wine bar/patio, later announced that the plans have been called off.

In October 2011 Weingarten completed a renovation of $1.15 million. The company planted palm trees from Florida along the curbs, and it added energy-saving lighting. In a 38-year period ending in 2012, Weingarten spent over $115 million in renovations to the River Oaks Shopping Center.

=== Redevelopment ===
The front page of the July 22, 2006 Houston Chronicle reported there were plans to demolish parts of the River Oaks Shopping Center and to build redevelopment, including a Barnes & Noble, on the site of one portion, a building on the northeast corner of Shepherd Drive and West Gray, for redevelopment. These plans, which were unconfirmed by the newspaper, stated that the River Oaks Theatre would be demolished.

In 2007 Weingarten announced for certain it was going to demolish the northeast corner portion of the center. Weingarten announced that a $15 million, about 60,000-square-foot (5,600 m^{2}) complex of two- and three-story buildings, anchored by a two-story Barnes & Noble, would replace the former portion. The plans called for a spa, office space, shops, and restaurants to be housed in the new complex. The Starbucks on that lot was not affected.

There was a campaign to preserve the Art Deco building. The Greater Houston Preservation Alliance (GPHA) made a petition that got over 25,000, asking for Barnes & Noble to not lease space in the project. This petition was sent to the Barnes & Noble chairperson and CEO. The GPHA stated that the Houston Archaeological and Historical Commission included the River Oaks Shopping Center portion, the Alabama Theatre, and the River Oaks Theater in its list of fifty most important historic buildings in Houston. The GPHA also asked the Texas Historical Commission (THC) to inquire about the historical eligibility of the old portion. The THC ruled it to be eligible to be on the National Historic Register, along with the Alabama and River Oaks Theatres.

That year, the City of Houston Planning Commission recommended that the shopping center be designated as a historic landmark. This designation would give tax breaks discouraging demolition. In July 2007 some trees in the area were felled to prepare for the demolition. The City of Houston designated the River Oaks Shopping Center, Alabama Theatre, and the River Oaks Theatre as historic landmarks. Under the city law at the time, the owners and developers of a building designated as a landmark can still demolish a building designated as such without penalty if they apply for a certificate of nondesignation. If this is granted, the recognition of a place as being a historic landmark is delayed for a six-month period. During this period the owner and/or developer is/are free to demolish the building.

On September 4, 2007, demolition of the old portion began. In 2007 Jennifer Friedburg of the Houston Chronicle wrote that pro-preservationists "will certainly continue to try to change the rules to protect other buildings that might be demolished in the future" and that "While this act seals the center’s fate, it will do little to end the debate about what type of city Houston is, what it values and what it will look like in the future."

In 2018 Weingarten announced plans to demolish the section with the former Laff Stop Comedy club so a thirty-story residential tower could be built in its place.

== Location and composition ==
The center is at the intersection of West Gray Avenue and South Shepherd Drive in Neartown, adjacent to the eastern boundary of River Oaks.

The center is 2 miles (3.2 km) west of Downtown Houston, 2 miles (3.2 km) north of the Rice University/Texas Medical Center area, 3 miles (4.8 km) east of Uptown Houston/The Galleria, and 2 miles (3.2 km) south of the Houston Heights.

In 2017 Weingarten announced plans to build a 30-story residential tower with construction scheduled to begin in 2018. Ziegler Cooper is the architect. The tower, which will house ground-level retail in about 10,000 square feet (930 m^{2}) of space, would replace parking spaces and an existing building that houses the restaurants Café Ginger and Local Pour.

== Architecture ==
The Houston Chronicle wrote that the center had "a snazzy “modern” design evocative of the era in which the center was built".

The parts of the River Oaks Shopping Center are along both sides of West Gray Avenue. Richard Longstreth of Cite described the two main buildings as being "mirror images, each framing a forecourt, as if two of the Washington centers were face to face." Longstreth wrote that Potter had "probably stipulated" this design "at the outset".

The main buildings had a semicircular shape. This way, automobile drivers entering the forecourt could see all of the stores. and drivers traveling from River Oaks to Downtown Houston would also be able to see the stores. Anna Mod wrote that the entrances to the shops each had "a solid base, large windows, and a minimally detailed cornice."

Longstreth wrote that the shape and the "abstract, minimalist vocabulary" were "[t]wo of the most distinctive features" in Winston's architectural plans, and that this arrangement "imparted a sense of fluidity that stood in distinct contrast to even the least historicizing Washington centers then realized, where form and composition engendered a feeling of static reserve."

== Tenants ==
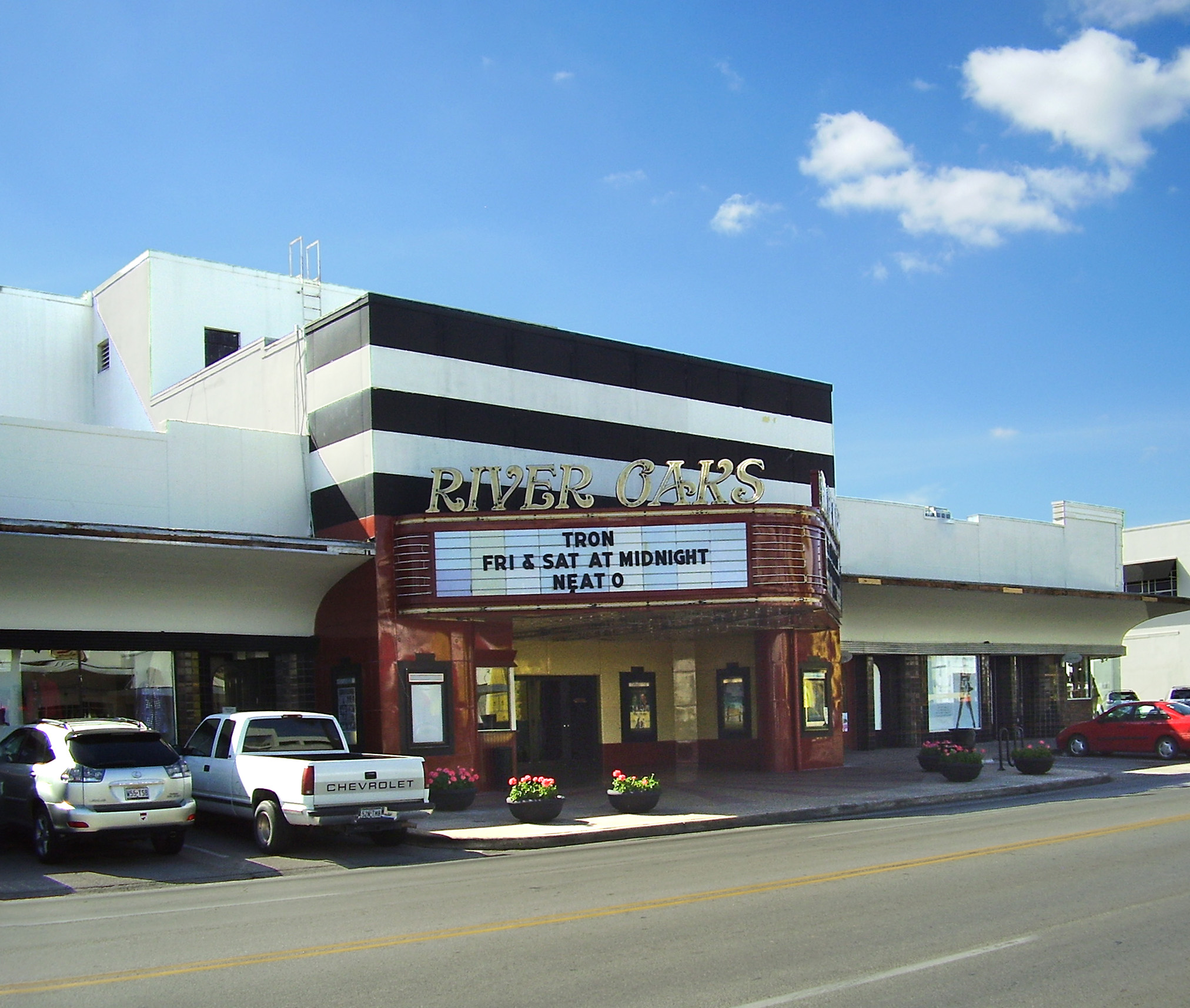
River Oaks Theatre

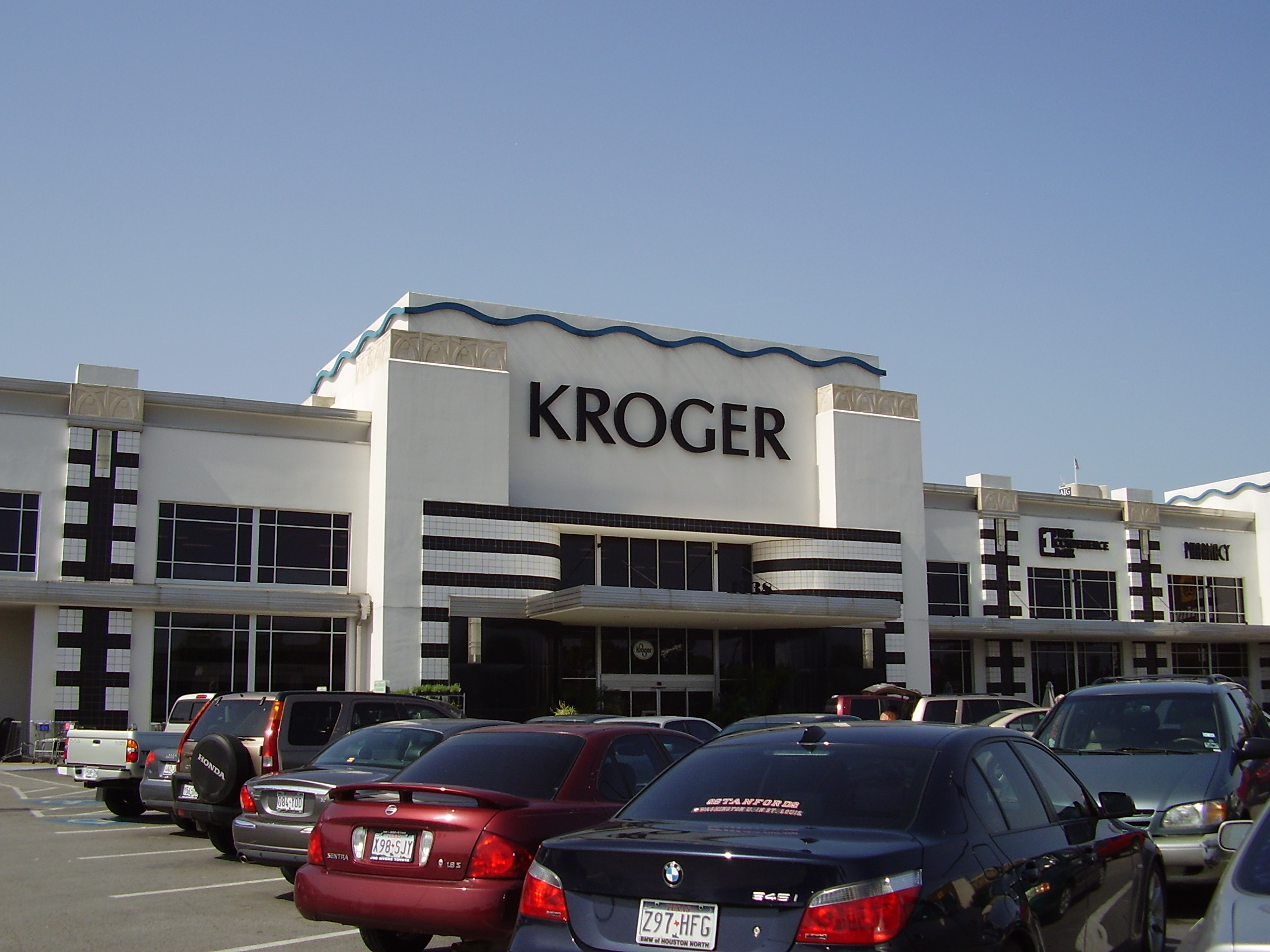
Kroger

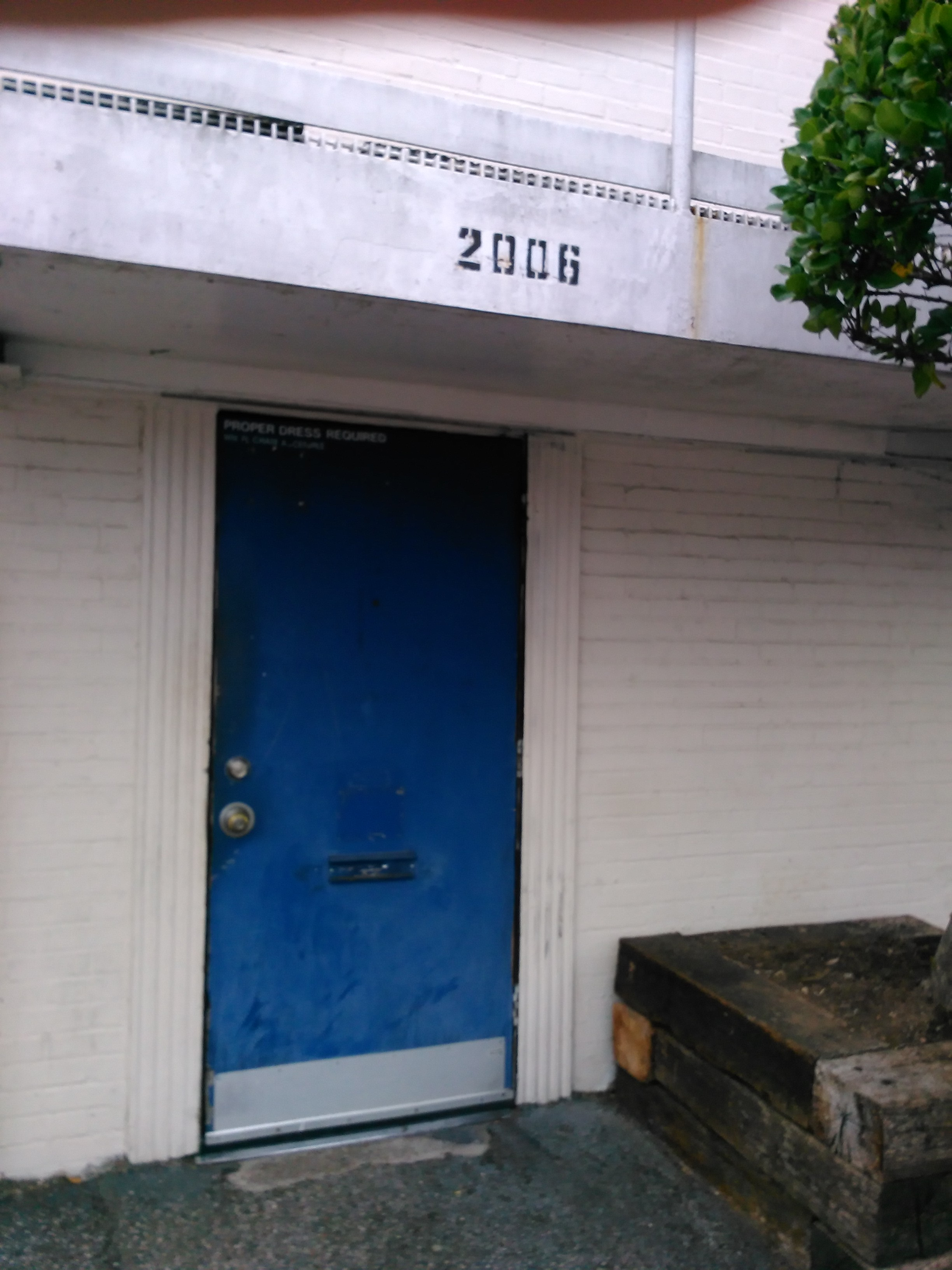
Marfreless Bar, accessible through this door

Tenants include Barnes & Noble, Kroger Signature, Jos A. Bank, the River Oaks Theatre, and Starbucks. Previously the shopping center had two Starbucks locations, with one being referred to by a joke that Lewis Black made in 2002. That Starbucks closed in 2020.

In 1987 Events, a gift store, opened. Events is in a 6,000-square-foot (560 m^{2}) space. The founders, Jay Rosenstein and Raymond Barron, sold it to Regina Garcia in 2013.

La Griglia Restaurant is in the center. In 2006 Mimi Swartz of National Geographic wrote that La Griglia is "the River Oaks lunch spot of choice."

The section that was demolished in 2007 included a Black-eyed Pea, a Jamba Juice, a Jos. A. Bank, and a bakery. The Jamba Juice and Jos. A. Bank moved while the Black-eyed Pea and the bakery closed.

In 2007 Boutique Em&Lee and the lingerie boutique La Mode moved within the shopping center.

In 2010 Weingarten announced that a branch of the Américas restaurant by Michael Cordua will open in the center.

As of 2010 Tony Mandola's Gulf Coast Kitchen had been located in the center for 20 years. At that time there were plans to move.

In 2011 the record shop Allrecords was notified that the Luke's Locker wanted to expand, so Allrecords decided to move out of the center. It was there for 30 years.

In 2013 Atrium Ready to Wear, a fashion designer clothing store, and Casa de Novia Bridal Couture, a bridal dress shop, moved into the center in a space below the Américas restaurant. The former moved into a 1,000-square-foot (93 m^{2}) area while the letter moved into a 2,600-square-foot (240 m^{2}) area; both are separated from one another by a low glass partition. The combined new space of the shops is 1,000 square feet (93 m^{2}) larger than the combined previous one.

Marfreless Bar moved to a two-story area behind the River Oaks Theatre in 1976. In 2013 Marfreless announced it was closing. It was accessible through an unmarked door. The closure was scheduled for March 30, 2013. In June 2013 the bar announced it was going to reopen later that summer, with new management.

The first J McLaughlin in Texas was scheduled to open at this center on July 19, 2013.

A 12,500-square-foot (1,160 m^{2}) Kelsey Seybold Clinic opened in 2021.

== Apartment complex ==
The complex has an apartment complex, The Driscoll at River Oaks. It is scheduled to open in 2021, and construction began in 2018. The range of units is from 900 square feet (84 m^{2}) to 3,000 square feet (280 m^{2}). The complex is within the Houston Independent School District (HISD), and is assigned to Wilson Montessori School, Lanier Middle School, and Lamar High School.

== See also ==
- Alabama Theatre (Houston)
- Village Arcade
