= St. Anne Catholic School (Houston) =

Catholic school in Texas, United States

Coordinates: 29.742899°N 95.410968°W

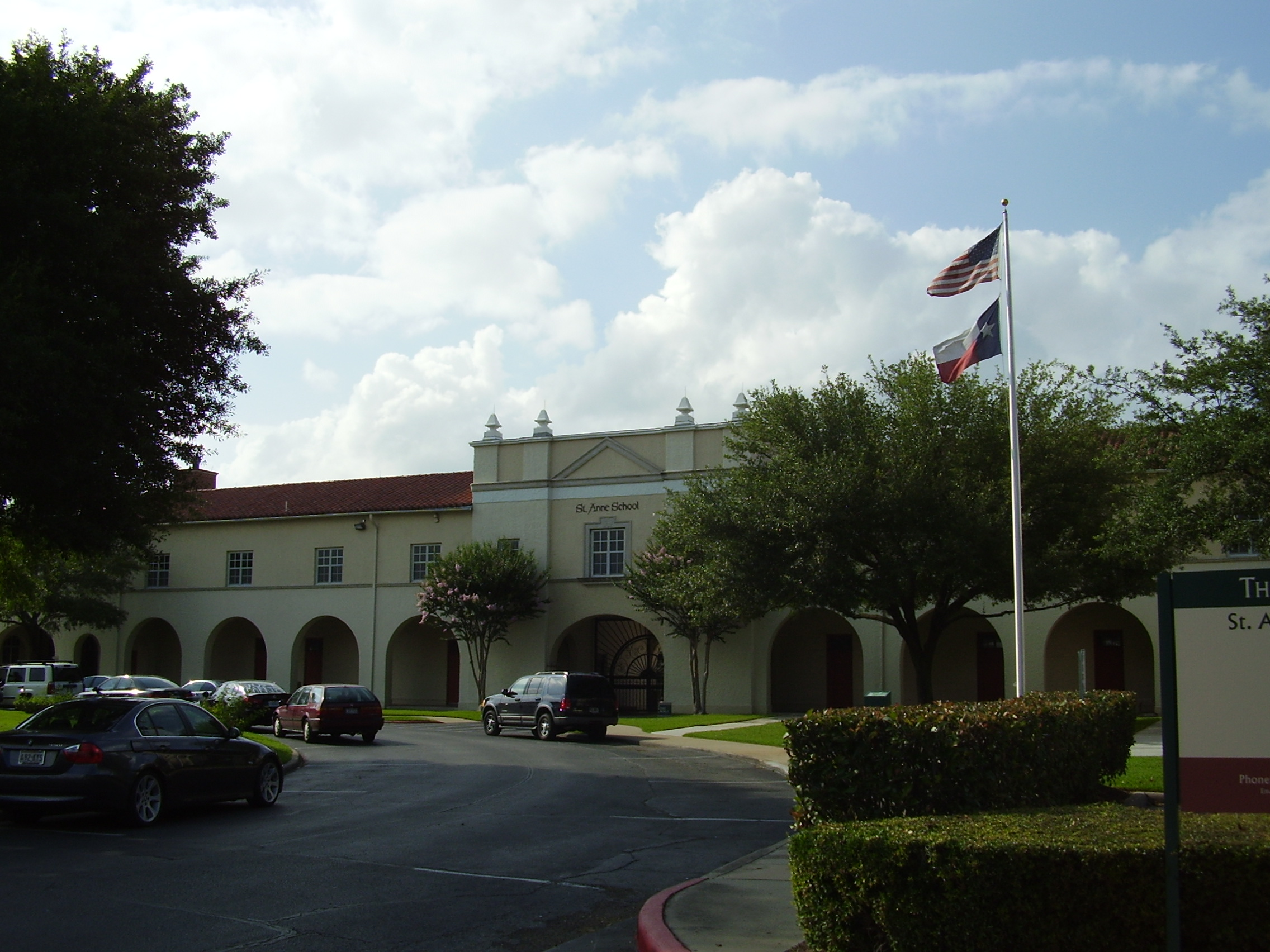

Information
- Religious affiliation: Roman Catholic
- Grades: Kindergarten - Grade 8

St. Anne Catholic School is a Roman Catholic parochial school located at 2120 Westheimer Road in Houston, Texas, United States. A part of the Roman Catholic Archdiocese of Galveston-Houston, the school is located at the southeast corner of the intersection of Westheimer and Shepherd.

The school serves Kindergarten through eighth grade. In 2006 St. Anne Catholic School received the Blue Ribbon Award. Students wear school uniforms.

== See also ==
- Christianity in Houston
