= The Post Oak School =

Private school in Great Houston, Texas

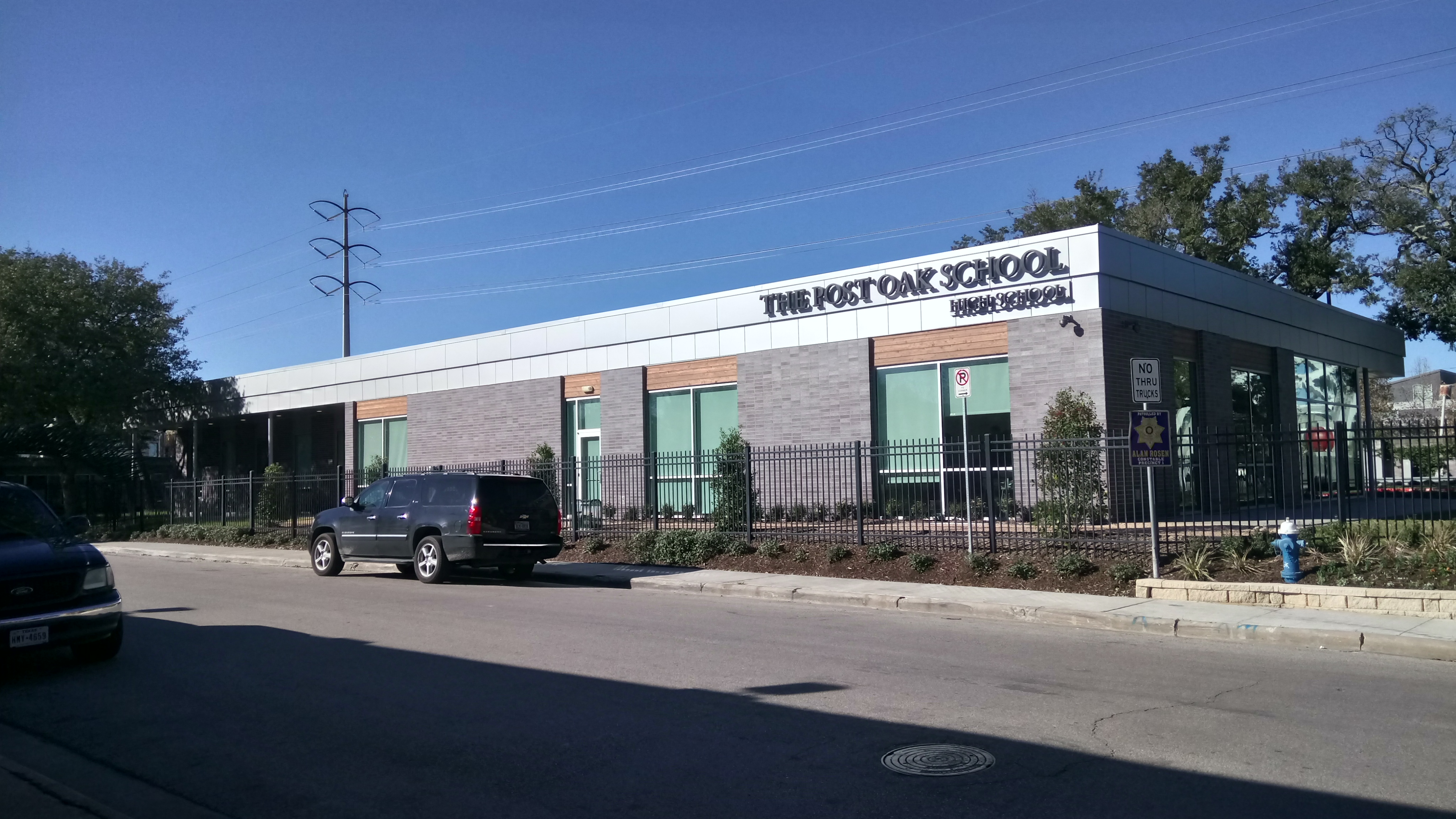
- Post Oak School Museum District Campus High School

Location
- Bissonnet Campus (PreK-Primary): 4600 Bissonnet Street, Bellaire, TX 77401-3099; Museum District Campus (Secondary): 1010 Autrey Street, Houston, TX 77006

Information
- Type: Private school
- Website: postoakschool.org

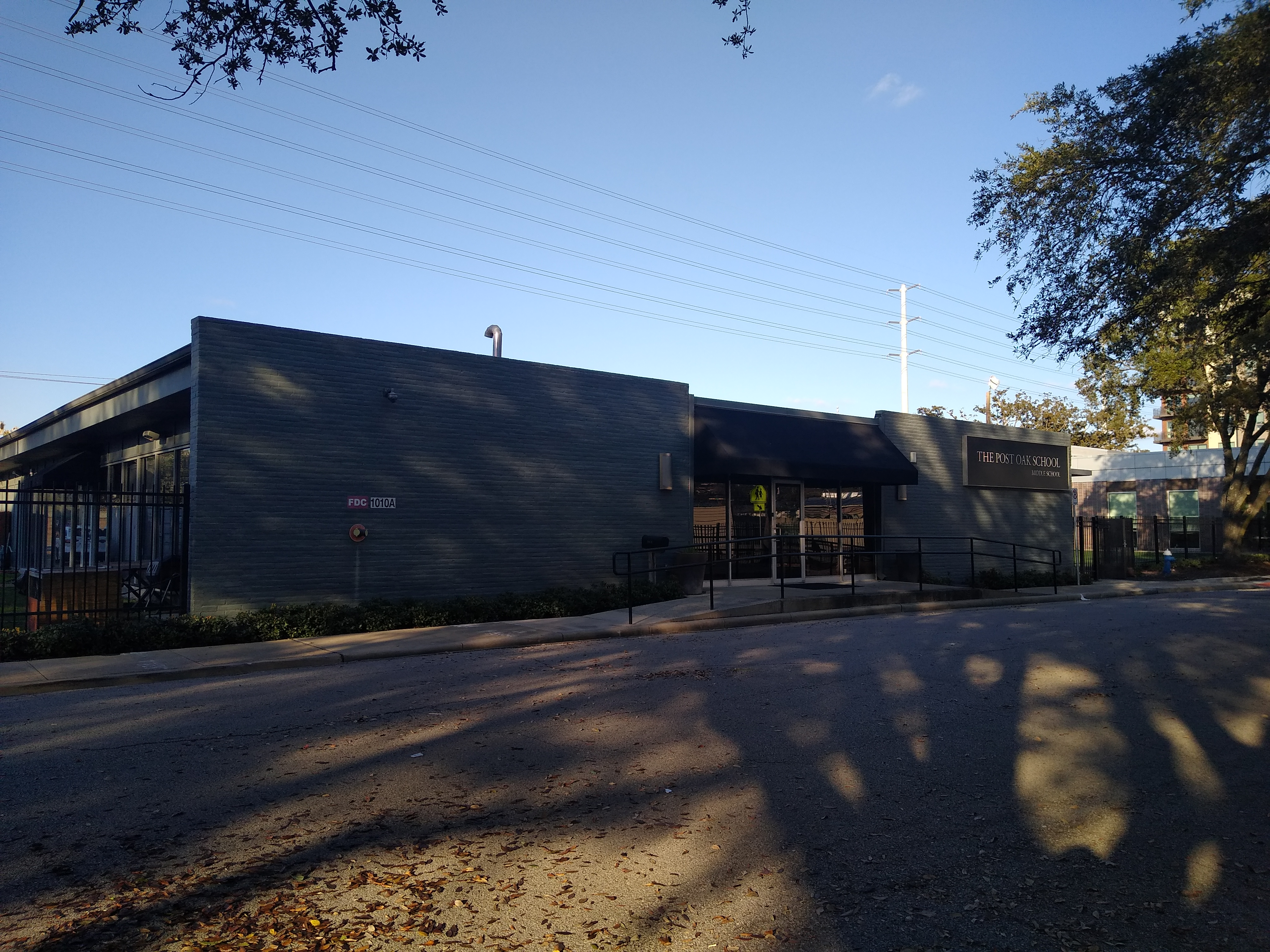
The Post Oak School Middle School

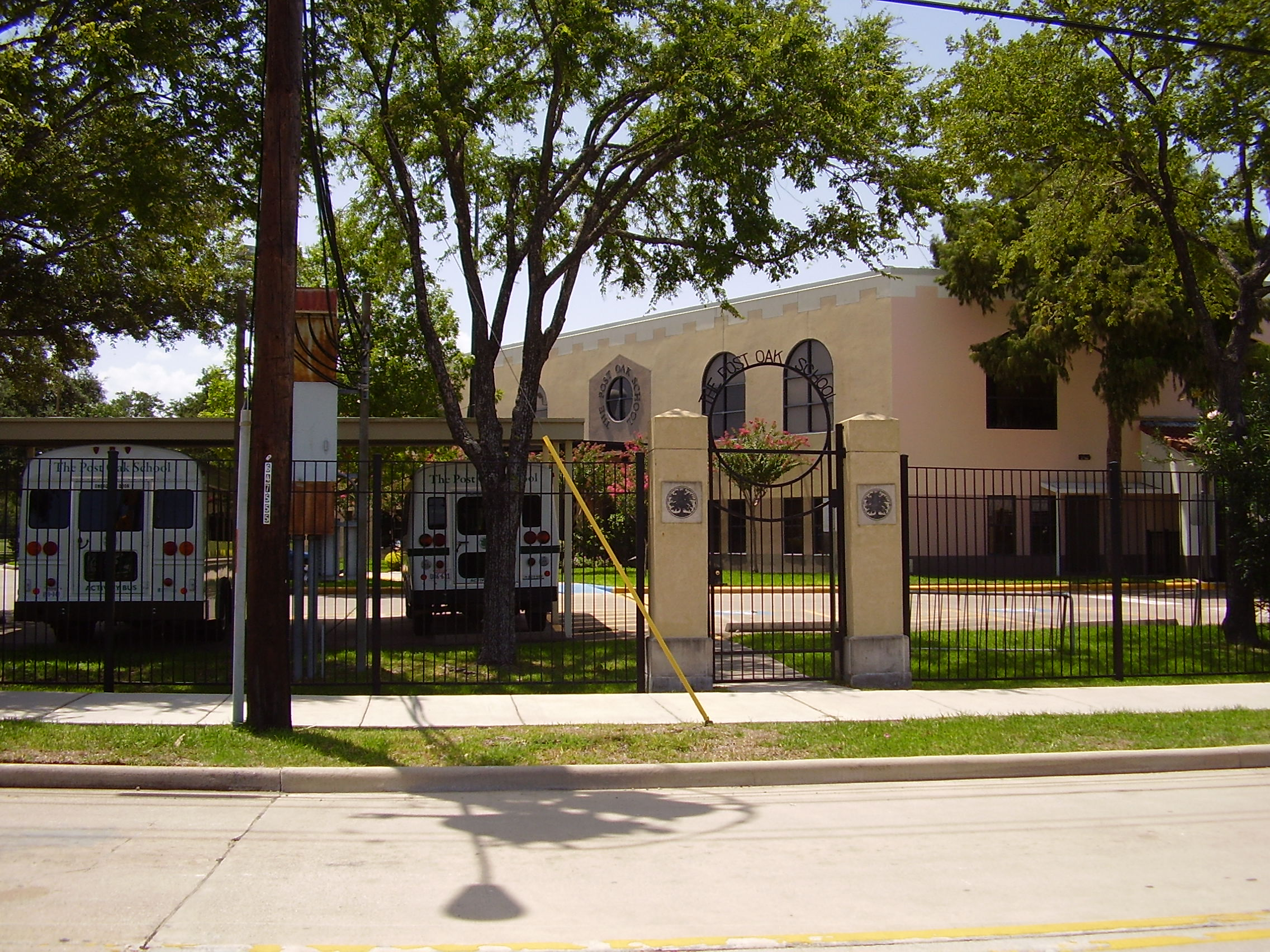
The Post Oak School Bissonnet Campus (elementary school)

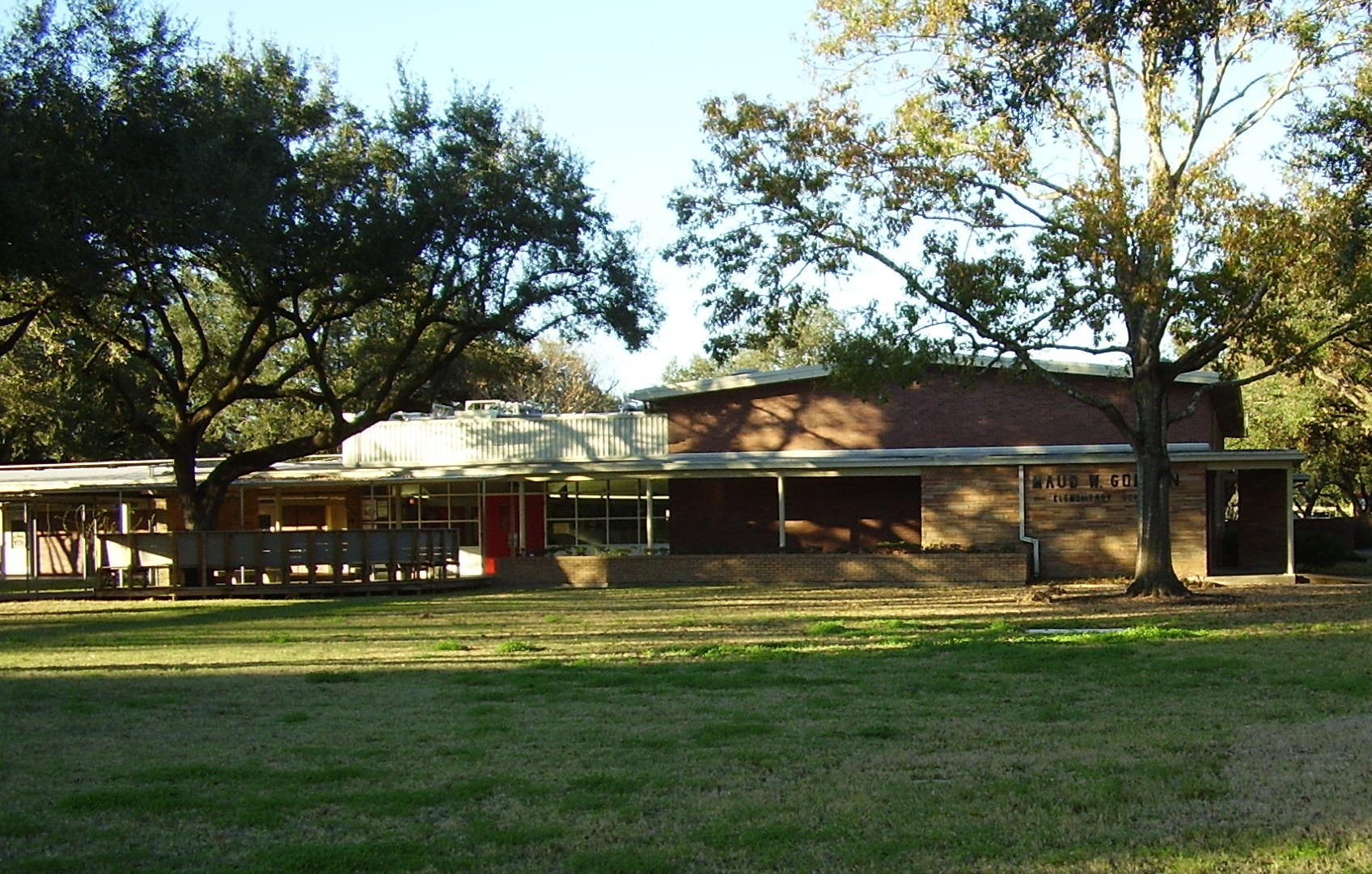
Gordon Elementary School (now Mandarin Chinese Language Immersion Magnet School), the former site of The Post Oak School

The Post Oak School is a private Montessori K-12 school with two campuses in Greater Houston. The preschool through elementary location is the Bissonnet Campus in Bellaire, Texas while the middle-high school is in the Museum District of Houston.

Founded in 1963, the school is a non-profit corporation. It is accredited by the Independent Schools Association of the Southwest (ISAS). The school serves approximately 600 students, from 14 months through high school. The classroom levels are Infant Community, Primary, Lower Elementary, Upper Elementary, Middle School, and High School. Each level consists of children in three-year age ranges (apart from middle school which has a two-year age range, and high school consisting of a four-year range).

After the 1983 closure of Gordon Elementary School, a Houston Independent School District public school facility, as a neighborhood school, Gordon temporarily housed The Post Oak School.

== K-6 campus ==
The K-6 campus in Bellaire had, in 2010, 3.5 acres (1.4 ha) of space. It began using the permanent Bellaire campus circa 1987.

In 2013 the school received a permit to expand from the Bellaire City Government.

== High school and Middle School ==
The Post Oak High School is a private Montessori high school in the Museum District, Houston. The high school opened in the fall of 2012.

It is the first high school to open in the Museum District and it is the third Montessori high school in Houston.

Post Oak School began plans to establish a high school in 2010. In 2011 the school plans called for partnering with area medical institutions and museums. The school is in proximity to the Texas Medical Center. The school has a student population of about 100.

It also has a Middle School at the same campus in the Museum District, and it serves about 60 students as of Fall 2025.

Campuses in the 610 Loop Area

== Notable alumni ==
One well-known graduate of The Post Oak School is U.S. figure skater Becky Bereswill.
