= Czech Center Museum Houston =

Museum in Houston, Texas

Coordinates: 29.72889°N 95.38493°W

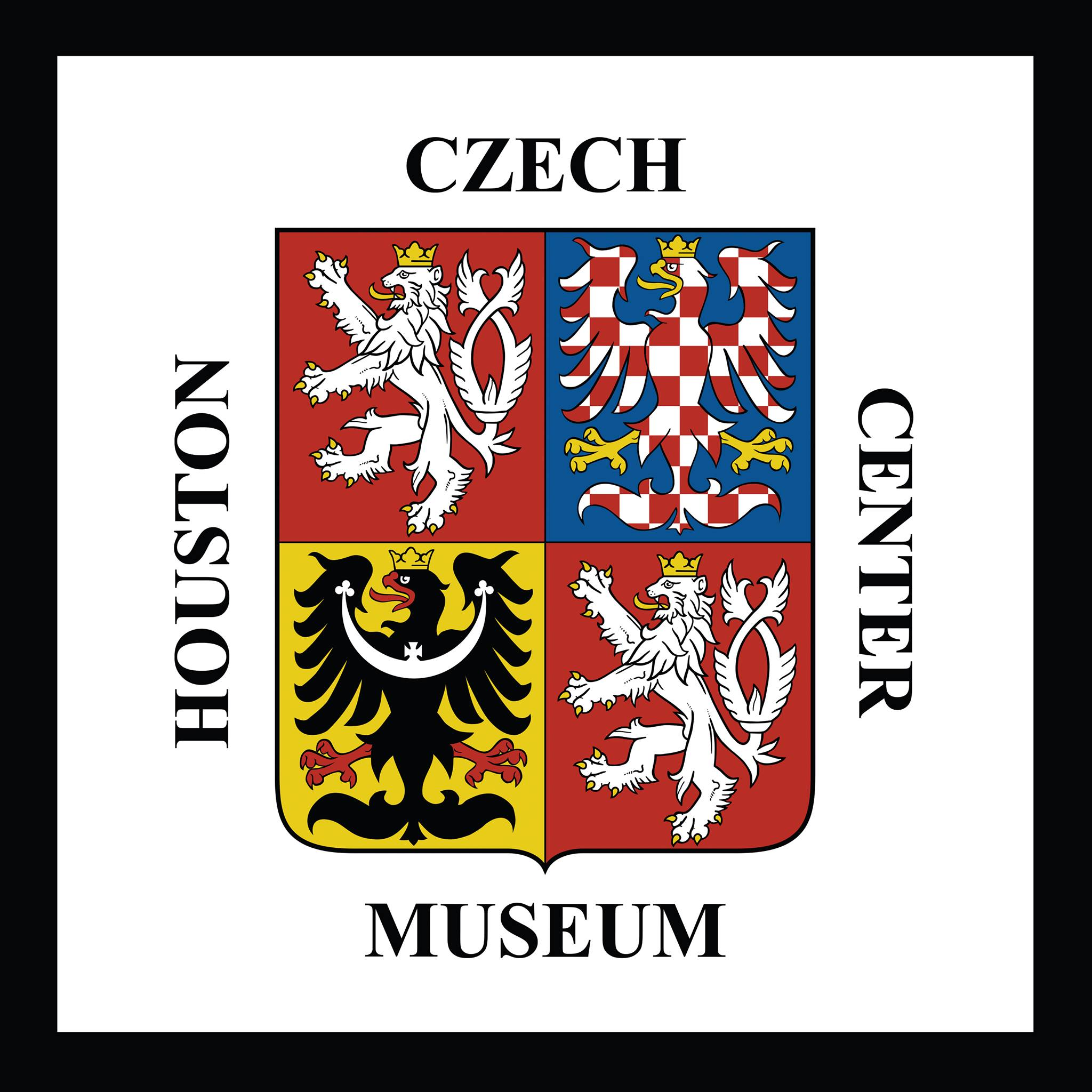
- Established: 1995
- Focus: Multifunctional organization focusing on culture, art, history, and community
- Address: 4920 San Jacinto Street
- Location: Houston, Texas
- Website: www.czechcenter.org

The Czech Center Museum Houston (DBA), also known as Czech Cultural & Community Center, is a multifunctional cultural organization in Houston, Texas. It is located in the Houston Museum District and has an area of 20,000-square-foot (1,900 m^{2}). It is committed to the education and celebration of Czech (Moravian, Bohemian, Silesian) and Slovak culture, art, and history.

== History ==
The organization was founded in 1995 as Czech Cultural & Community Center by Bill Rosene, Effie Rosene, and many other people's passionate hard work. Bill Rosene and Effie Rosene were handling the daily operations until 2017 and were involved until Effie Rosene's death in 2019.

Originally located in The Northwest Mall, the organization began construction of their new and current building at 4920 San Jacinto Street in 2002. The name was changed to Czech Center Museum Houston shortly after becoming part of the Houston Museum District. In 2005, the organization began construction of a third floor which was completed in 2009. The addition of the third floor allowed the museum to expand its collection and include the largest Czechoslovak Art Deco Collection in the United States donated by Eric Ottervik.

== Architecture ==
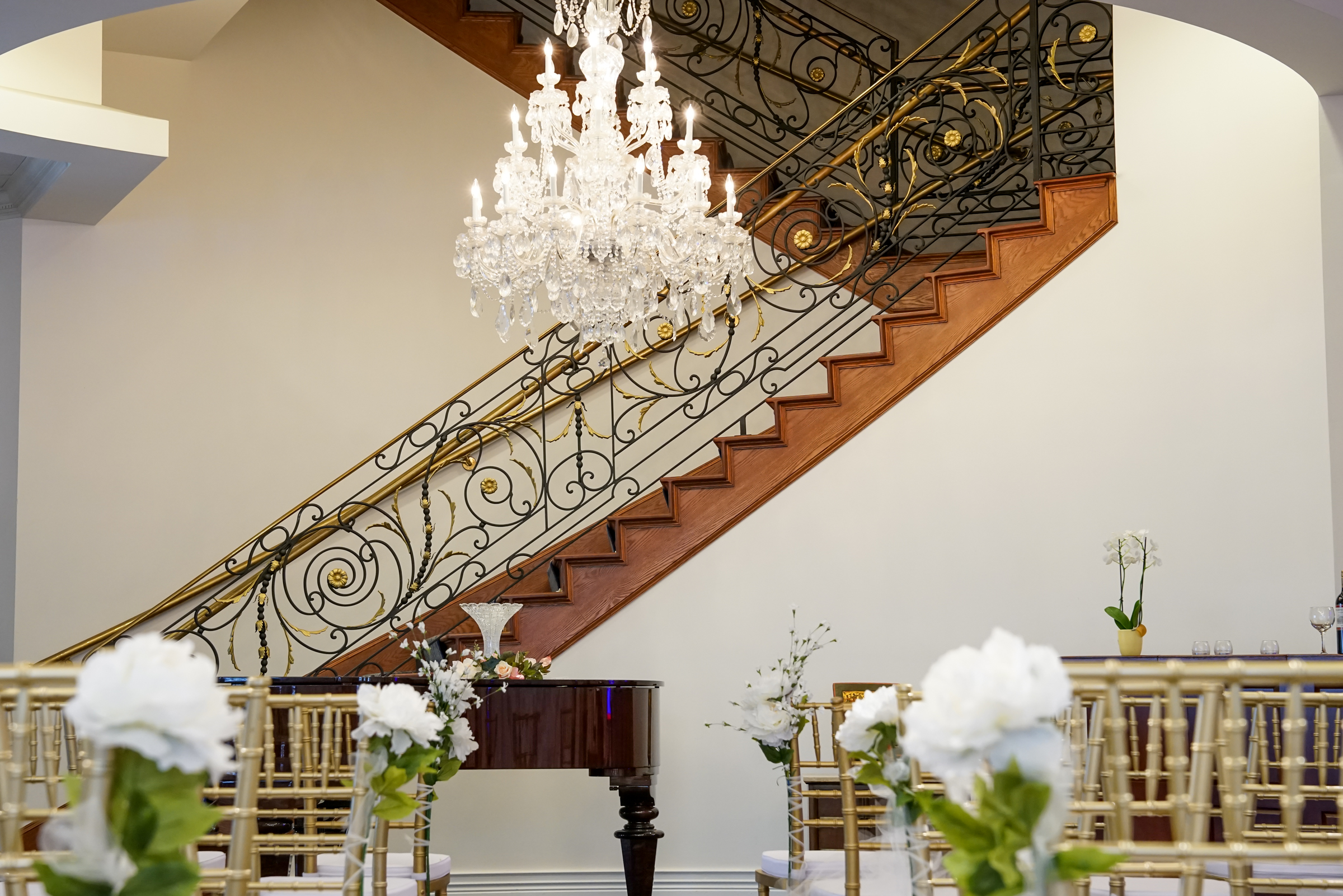

Czech Center Museum Houston's current building was built specifically for the museum inspired by 19th century Czech Villa designs, including baroque-style ornaments, stained glass, and authentic Bohemian crystal chandeliers. The museum consists of three floors, the first two floors, Prague Hall and Brno Gallery which were named after the two most populated cities in the Czech Republic. These halls are used for cultural events featuring local and international artists and musicians. The third floor consists of Pilsen Hall, the museum's main exhibit area, and Comenius Library.

== Art collection ==
Czech Center Museum Houston's current collection contains more than 5,000 pieces that demonstrate Czech and Slovak culture, art, and history of the last two centuries. The collection includes

- Bohemian, Moravian, Silesian, and Slovakian Folk art from the 18th century to 1980. The collection includes jewelry, kroje, textiles, sculptures, and antique ornaments.
- Czech and Slovak paintings and posters depicting the history of eastern European people.
- Bohemian Glass, crystal perfume bottles, and crystal chandeliers from the late 19th century to the modern era.
- An expansive library of books from Austria-Hungary to the modern era.
- Vintage Czech dolls and antique pottery and porcelain.

=== Moon Landscape replica by Petr Ginz ===
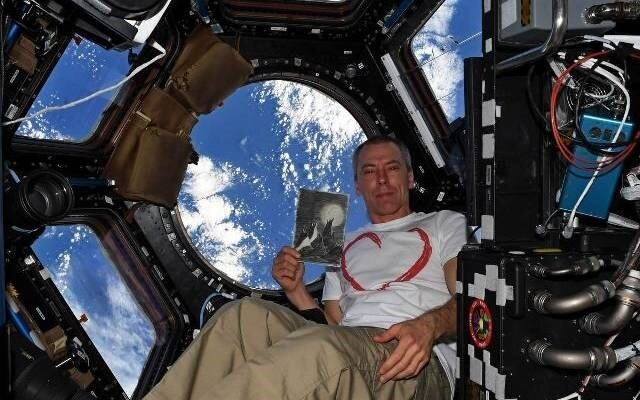
Feustel holding Peter Ginz's drawing

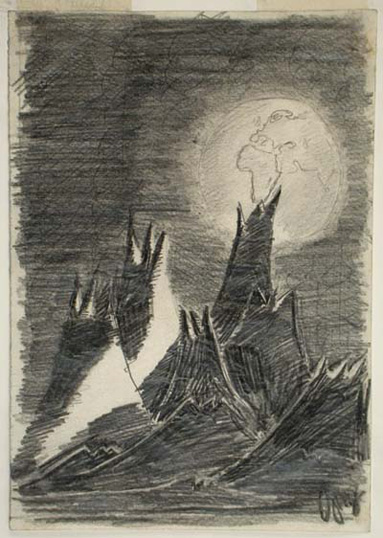
The drawing

In 2018, astronaut Andrew Feustel brought a copy of Petr Ginz's Moon Landscape drawing to the International Space Station. On February 1, 2020, Feustel donated the copy to Czech Center Museum Houston, which is now on display on the third floor. The donation was made in memory of Holocaust victims and the crew of Space Shuttle Columbia. Inspired by Ginz's story, Ilan Ramon – whose grandfather and other family members were murdered in the Holocaust – took Moon Landscape with him on Space Shuttle Columbia. The shuttle, crew, and drawing were destroyed upon re-entry to Earth's atmosphere.
