= Presbyterian School =

Private, Christian PreK–8 day school in Houston, Texas

Coordinates: 29.727995°N 95.390080°W

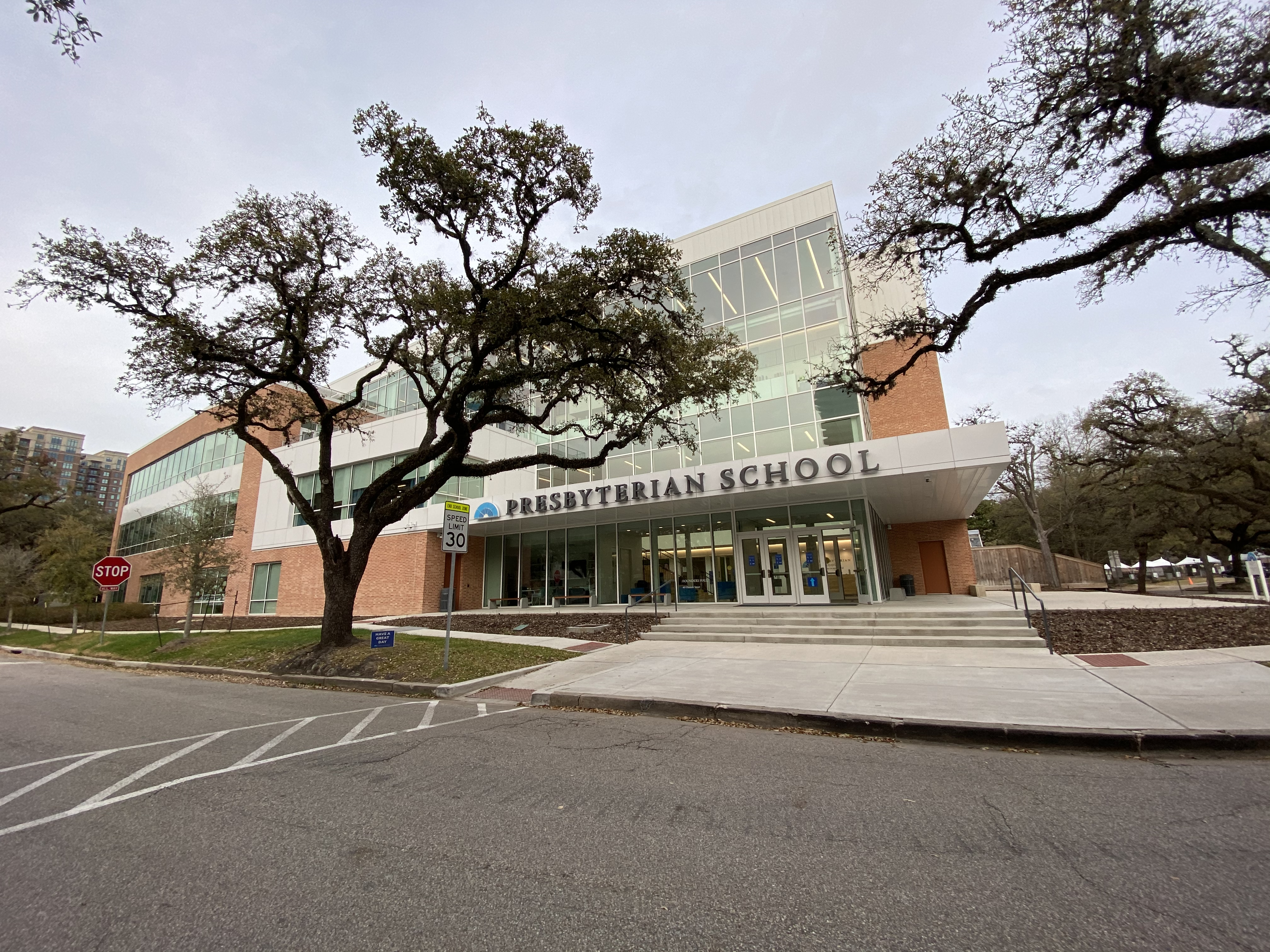
Presbyterian School

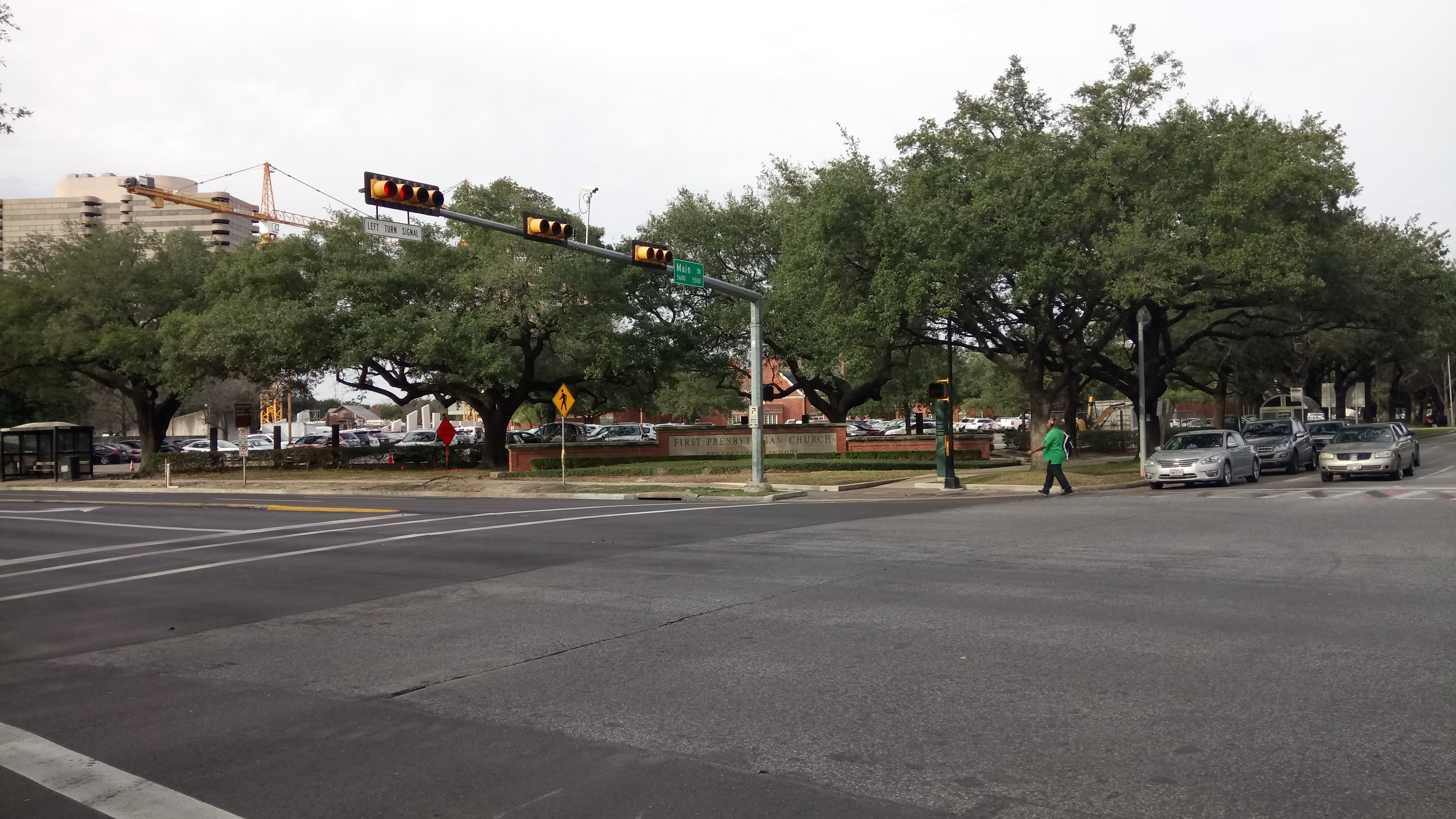
First Presbyterian Church and Presbyterian School

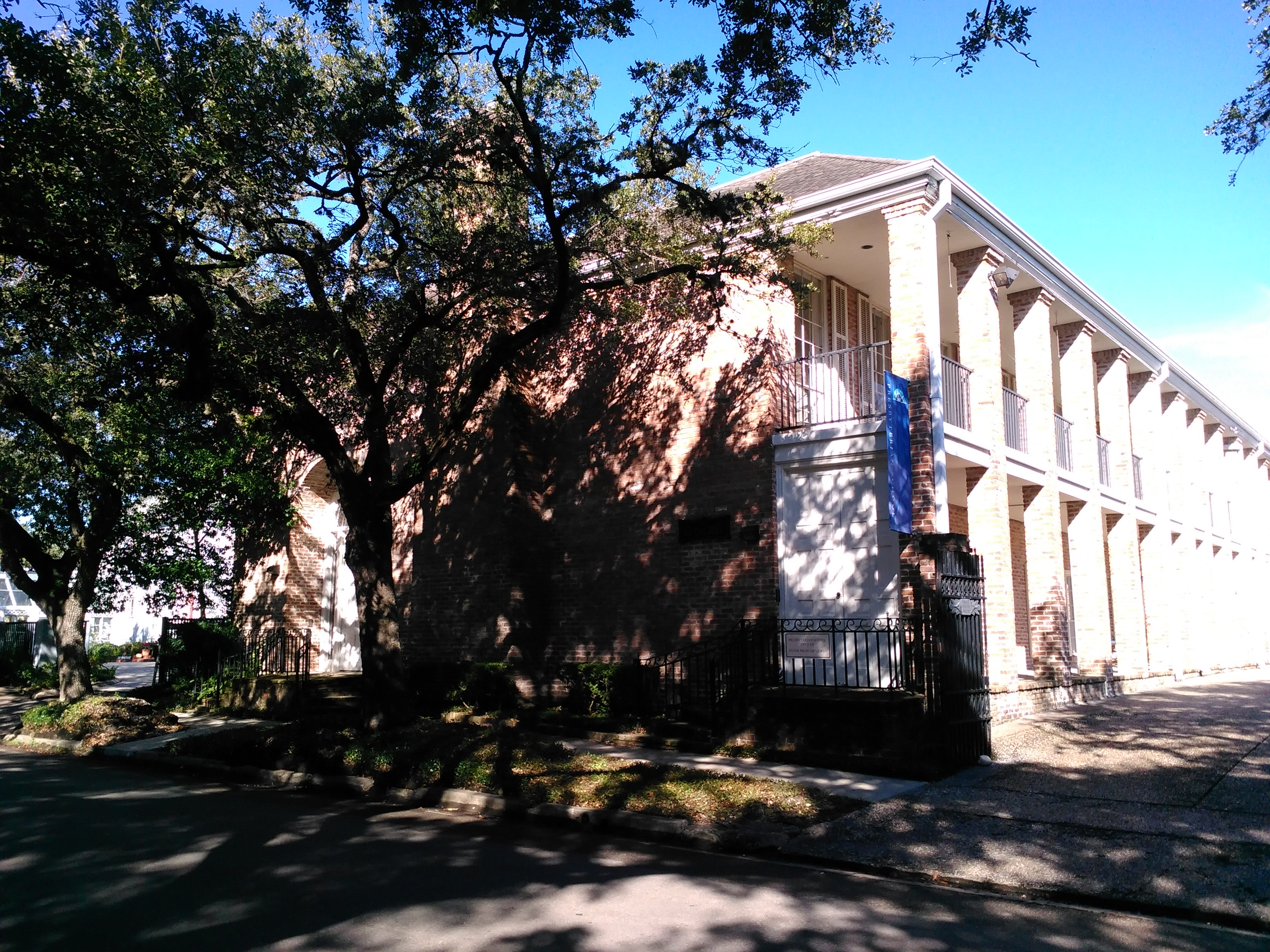
School offices at 100 Oakdale

Presbyterian School is a private, coeducational Christian PreK-8 day school in the Museum District, Houston. Presbyterian School is composed of three divisions: an Early Childhood division, PK3-Kindergarten, a Lower School division, first through fifth grade, and a Middle School division, sixth through eighth grade.

The school shares a campus with First Presbyterian Church as well as a standalone building and is governed by an independent board of trustees and maintains an independent 501(c)(3) non-profit corporation status. The school is financially independent from First Presbyterian Church.

== History ==
In 1986, Dr. John William Lancaster appointed a School Study Committee to explore the feasibility of an early childhood and lower school at the church. Presbyterian School was officially founded in 1988 and opened its doors in the fall of 1989. The original goal was to starting with those kindergarten age and younger and add an additional grade each year thereafter.

In August 2000, the school expanded with its addition of a middle school and accepted its first class of fifth and sixth graders. Presbyterian graduated its first class of eighth grade students in 2003. That year, Ray Johnson, formerly the principal of All Saints School in Tyler, Texas, became the principal at Presbyterian.

In 2005, Houston's Presbyterian School acquired over 14 acres (5.7 ha) of land 5 miles (8.0 km) from the school and embarked on a $6.5 million capital campaign to create a sports and outdoor education complex. As of that year it had 490 students.

== Memberships and accreditations ==
- Independent Schools Association of the Southwest (ISAS)
- National Association of Independent Schools (NAIS) Council for Advancement and Support of Education (CASE)
- Council for Spiritual and Ethical Education (CSEE)
- Educational Records Bureau (ERB)
- Houston Association of Independent Schools (HAIS)
- Independent School Management (ISM)

== Campus ==
Presbyterian School is located in the Museum District of Houston. The school counts among its neighbors institutions of learning and the arts such as Rice University, the Museum of Natural Science, Houston's Medical Center, the Houston Children's Museum, the Museum of Fine Arts and St. Thomas University. The main campus includes two learning commons, four science labs, two art rooms (including in-house kiln), two music rooms, an Academic Enrichment Center, two gymnasiums, a 1,200-seat theatre, sanctuary and chapel. Presbyterian School enrolls more than 600 children from age 3 through eighth grade.

Presbyterian School has expanded its campus to include a 14-acre (5.7 ha) Outdoor Education Campus (OEC) less than 5 miles (8.0 km) from the school. The outdoor campus is located just south of the Texas Medical Center on Highway 288 (9100 South Freeway) and is easily accessible by school bus. The Outdoor Education Campus provides space for environmental learning, sports and athletics, nature trails, play areas and outdoor worship.

== Academics ==
Early Childhood students explore ideas and develop skills through art, music and movement, dramatic play, blocks, language arts, social studies, and math. Field trips, interactive science experiments, and readiness activities in reading and math further enhance the program.

Lower School students are taught language arts, mathematics, and social studies in their primary classroom. Faculty with specialized training in science, art, chapel, library, music, and physical education provide instruction beyond the walls of a student's homeroom and in interdisciplinary activities.

Middle School students are required to take five core classes including English, History, Mathematics, Science and Spanish. Rotation classes are also required for students in each grade. In sixth grade those include Art, Religion, Music, and Study Skills. In seventh and eighth grade those include Wellness electives (Life Skills, Bible, Health, PE, and Biomechanics) and Fine Arts electives (Drama, Music, Art, and Photography).

Core classes include:

- Core academics (Language Arts and Writing, Math, Science, Social Studies)
- Foreign Language (Spanish)
- Wellness (Chapel, Bible, PE)
- Fine Arts (Art, Music, Choir, Drama, Electives)
- Specialists (Center for Teaching & Learning, Learning Commons, Think.Make. Talk.)

Think.Make.Talk. is an academic program that asks students to think deeply about problems, ideas, projects, and research; creatively make real-world applications that flow out of that thinking; and talk to members of their community about how to develop it.

== Extracurricular activities ==
Students are encouraged to participate in activities that benefit the community through an annual day of service and yearlong service projects. Local organizations that have benefited from volunteer efforts include Child Advocates, Emergency Aid Coalition, Houston Food Bank, Main Street Ministries, Nehemiah Center, Kids Meals, Books Between Kids, and many more. Every Lower and Middle School grade participates in a yearlong service learning project that is integrated into their curriculum.

== Athletics ==
Presbyterian School offers over 35 sports teams for student athletes throughout the year who strive for the greatest rewards.

== See also ==
- Christianity in Houston
- Christian school
