= Houston Museum District =

Area in Houston, Texas, US

Coordinates: 29.725°N 95.389°W

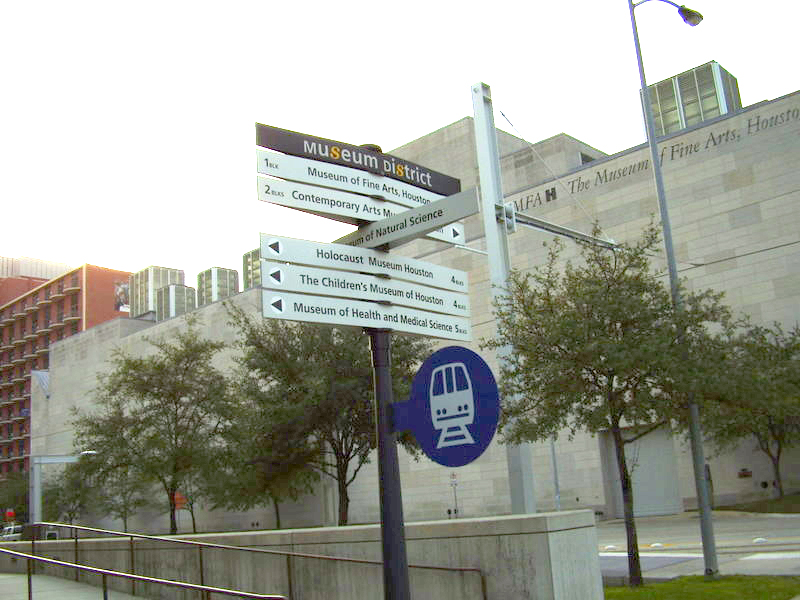
A direction sign in the Museum District

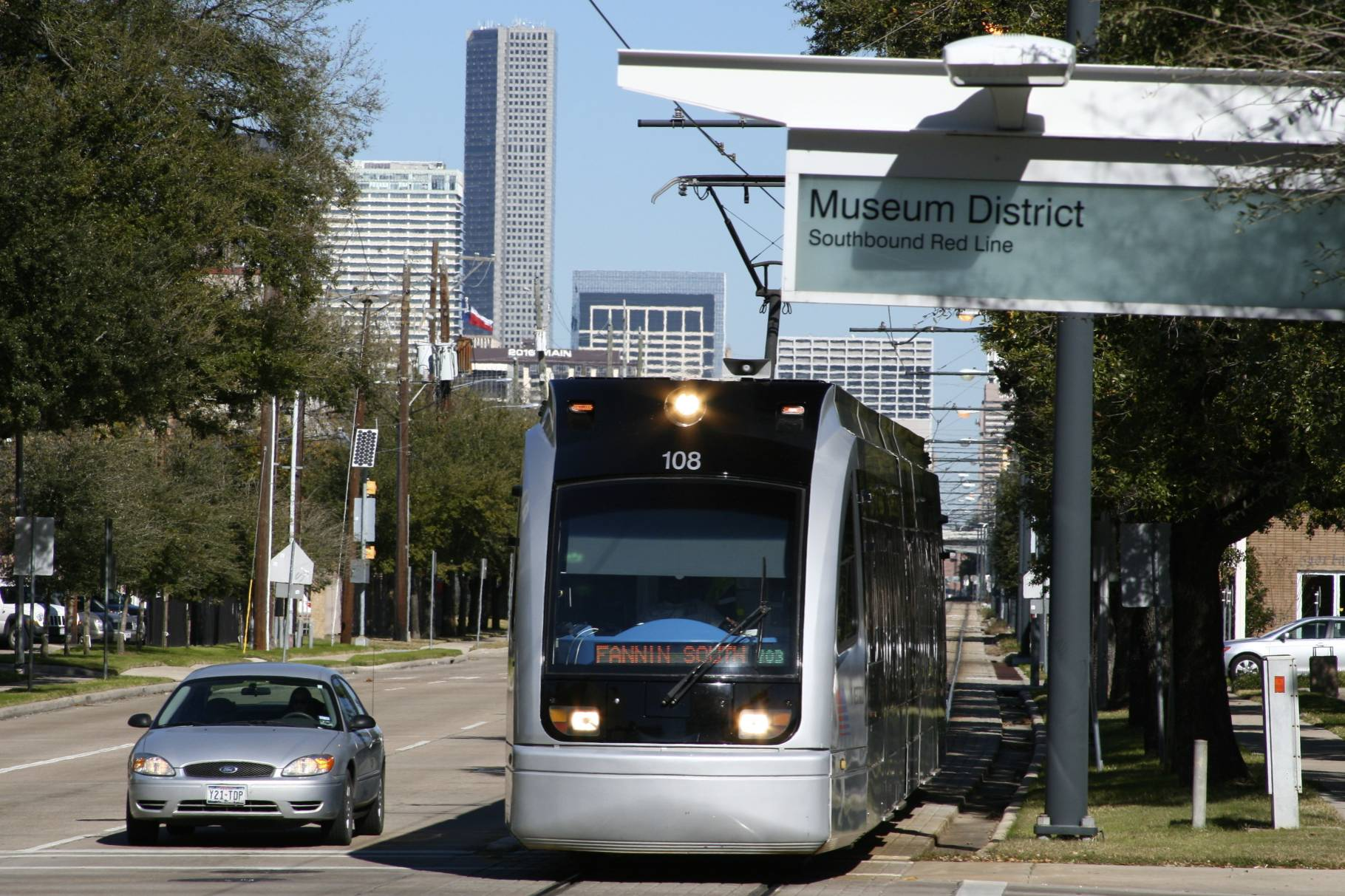
Museum District Red Line southbound station

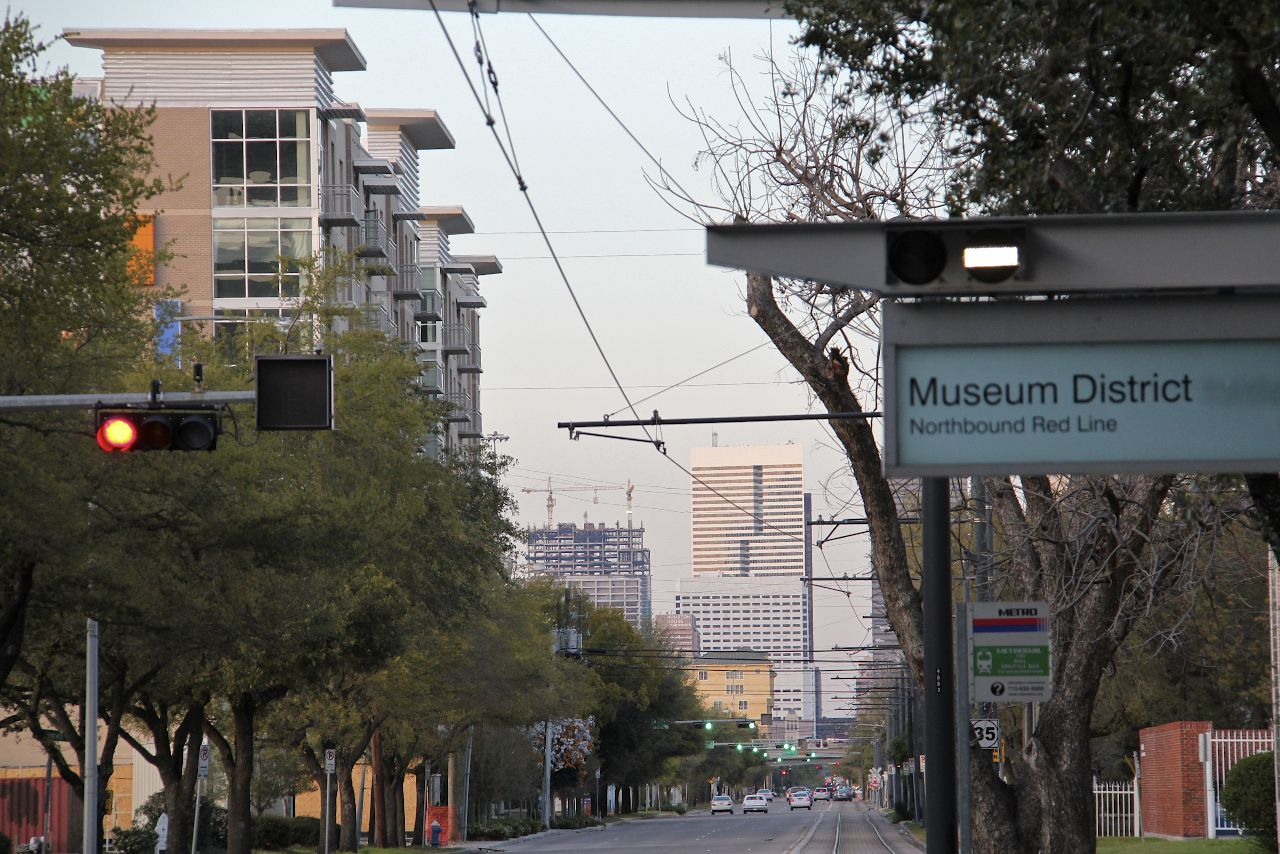
Museum District Red Line northbound station

The Houston Museum District is an association of 21 museums, cultural centers and community organizations dedicated to promoting art, science, history, and culture, located in Houston, Texas, United States.

The Houston Museum District currently includes 21 museums that recorded a collective attendance of around 7 million visitors a year. All of the museums offer free times or days and 11 of the museums are free all the time. Thursdays the Museum District gets particularly crowded because of museum free days. On Thursdays, The Children's Museum of Houston is free after 5 p.m., The Health Museum is free from 2–7 pm, and the Museum of Fine Arts, Houston is free 11 am - 9 pm. The Houston Museum of Natural Science is free on Tuesdays between 5-8 pm.

Houston's Museum District is walkable and bikeable. Sidewalks are wide and well-maintained, and attractions and restaurants are situated near each other.

The district is bordered roughly by Texas State Highway 288, Hermann Park, U.S. Route 59, and the Texas Medical Center. The Museum District Civic Association compared the area to Georgetown in Washington, D.C., and to the French Quarter of New Orleans.

The Museum District is served by four stops on the METRORail, one specifically named for it and is easily accessible from I-69/US 59, State Highway 288 and Main Street, across from the main entrance to Rice University.

The beginnings of the Museum District are found in 1977, when it became apparent that some action needed to be taken to provide easier access to the museums of the area. This call for community improvement evolved into the non-profit Montrose Project by the mid-1980s but changed into the Museum District Development Association of Houston (MDDAH) shortly thereafter. Based on the works of this organization, the Museum District was formally recognized by the City of Houston in 1989. The founding organization was dissolved in 1994, but the Museum District is now under the auspices of the Houston Museum District Association, founded in 1997.

The Museum District attracts visitors, students and volunteers of all ages, backgrounds, and ethnicities to learn about and celebrate art, history, culture, and nature around the world. More information on the 21 institutions of Houston's Museum District may be found on their official website.

== History ==
In the late 1970s, the area currently including the Houston Museum District had fallen into disrepair, badly needing attention from local, county and state governments to improve roads and beautify the area, then unsafe for pedestrian traffic and cyclists.

The Houston Museum District began as a grassroots community movement in 1977 led by Alexandra R. Marshall whose concept was to create a pedestrian-friendly district with the Museum of Fine Arts, at the intersection of Bissonnet Street and Montrose Boulevard, as its core. In such a strongly vehicle-oriented city, and one which to this day retains the title of the largest city in the United States without zoning, this was fairly progressive.

The Museum District Development Association of Houston proposed a multi-phase plan to beautify and make more pedestrian-friendly the area located between Allen Parkway, Buffalo Bayou and Hermann Park. It took advantage of the opportunity to create in Houston an area of vital urban importance, similar to the French Quarter in New Orleans, St. Germain in Paris, and Georgetown in Washington, DC.

Since its creation, the numerous efforts of the Houston Museum District organizations have included community improvement projects, tree planting, sidewalk planning, construction and expansion, esplanade design, development and beautification, establishment of public transportation to and from the area, police support and various cultural events

The Montrose Association, the Museum Area Municipal Association, the South Main Civic Association, the Cultural Arts Center of Houston and TALA (Texas Accountants and Lawyers for the Arts) all played a part in the development and subsequent success in the creation of the Houston Museum District.

=== Timeline ===
- 1977: Concept formulated, area associations involved.
- January 1986: Montrose Project incorporated.
- July 1986: Montrose Project becomes the Museum District Development Association of Houston.
- March 1987: MDDAH gains 501(c)3 status.
- May 1988: “Raiders of the Lost Art” event held to raise funds and awareness of the District.

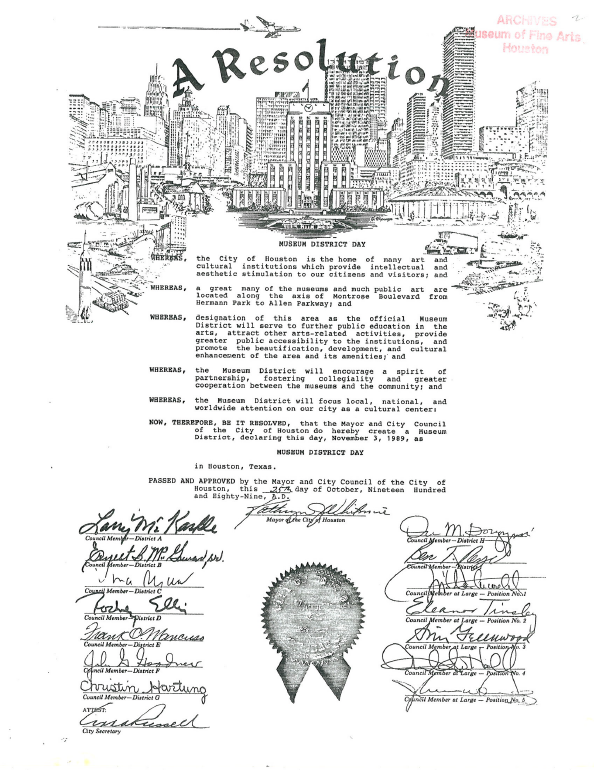
City of Houston Museum District Resolution

- September 1989: The Museum District receives a Clean Houston Honorable Mention in the Proud Partners Awards for its Museum District Improvement program.
- September 1989: Business leaders, museum directors and members gathered to sign a coalition agreement supporting a City of Houston Resolution creating an official Museum District.
- October 18, 1989: The area along Montrose Boulevard, from Allen Parkway to Hermann Park was designated by the City of Houston City Council and Mayor Kathryn Whitmire as the official Museum District of Houston.
- 1990: The Cultural Arts Council of Houston, now known as Houston Arts Alliance published The Cultural Guide to Houston, a guide book of Houston which included maps of each cultural center in the city, including a map of the Museum District.
- December 1991: MDDAH helped host the 5th Annual Christmas and Hanukkah in Neartown, with a tree lighting, caroling and a Children's Parade and Festival.
- May 1992: “Savor the Flavors” benefit held for the Museum District, highlighting 23 local restaurants.
- 1994: The organized abandonment/dissolution of the 501(c)3 Museum District Development Association of Houston. Records were handed off to the South Main Center Association for further collaboration and development within the community.
- November 1996: Shepherded by the South Main Center Association, now South Main Alliance, the organizations of the Museum District joined to publish a brochure, promoting the Museum District, which included new member museums.
- January 1997: Eleven institutions reincorporated the Houston Museum District Association as a 501(c)3 corporation. Five new museums joined in 2002 and two more in 2007.

=== Founding members ===
According to 1st board meeting notes (October 4, 1986):

Directors:

- Alexandra Marshall, Chairman
- Ora Harrison, President
- Lyn Mathre
- Jan Chism
- John B. Honeycutt
- Barbara Brown
- Jill Hafner
- Nancy Hinckley
- Candyce Rylander
- Dr. William Shiffick

=== Ex Officio members ===
- Peter Marzio, Director, Museum of Fine Arts, Houston
- Truett Latimer, Director, Houston Museum of Natural Science
- Jane Jerry, Director, The Children's Museum
- Paul Winkler, Director, The Menil Collection
- Suzanne Delehanty, Director, The Contemporary Arts Museum
- Don Piercy, Director, The Museum of Print History
- Harla Kaplin, Director, Houston Fotofest, Inc.
- Jean Caslin, Director, Houston Center for Photography

=== Participating civic leaders at founding ===
- Marty Reiner, executive director, South Main Center Association
- Kathy Hanns, Director, The Art League of Houston
- Sarah Brunon, President, Neartown Association
- Gail Ramsey, President, Neartown Business Alliance
- Barry Moore, President, Museum Area Municipal Association
- Mimi Walker, President, Westmoreland Civic Association
- Burt Nix, President, Greater Montrose Business Guild
- Andrea di Bagno, Representative, Audubon Civic Club
- Jan Cato, Representative, Shadowlawn Civic Club
- Dr. Joseph McFadden, University of St. Thomas
- Dr. John Lancaster, Pastor, First Presbyterian Church
- Don Olson, Director, Parks and Recreation Department, City of Houston

== Current museum members ==
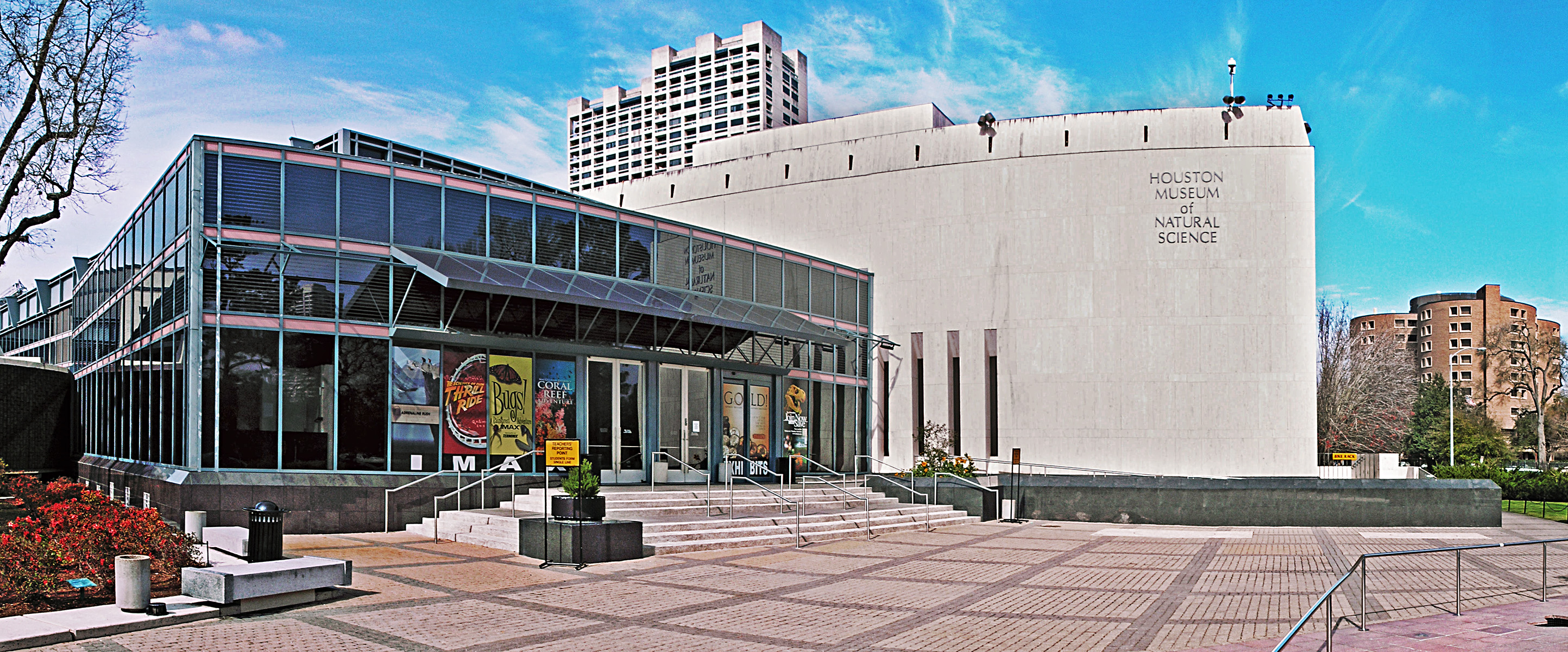
Museum of Natural Science

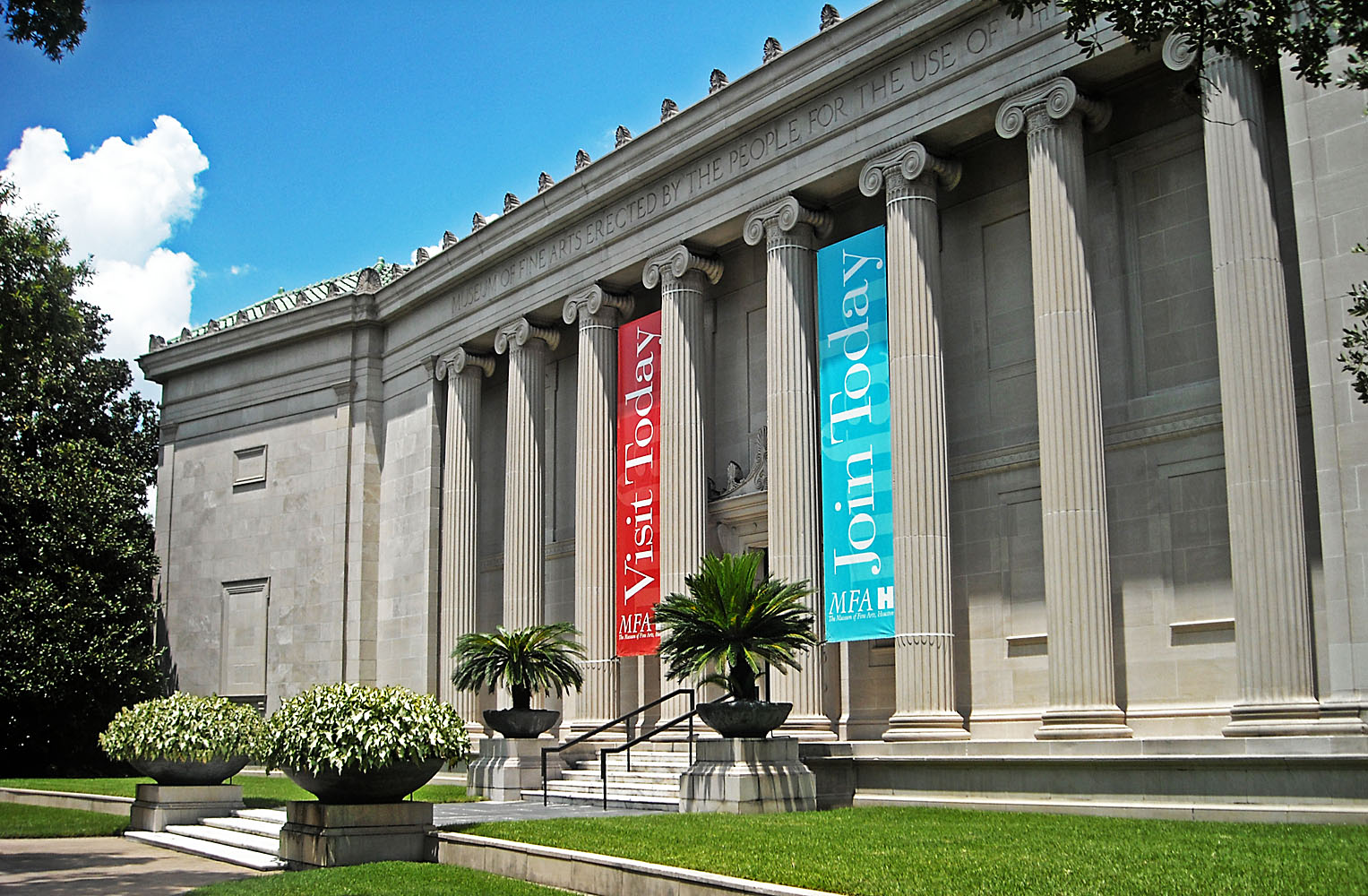
Museum of Fine Arts

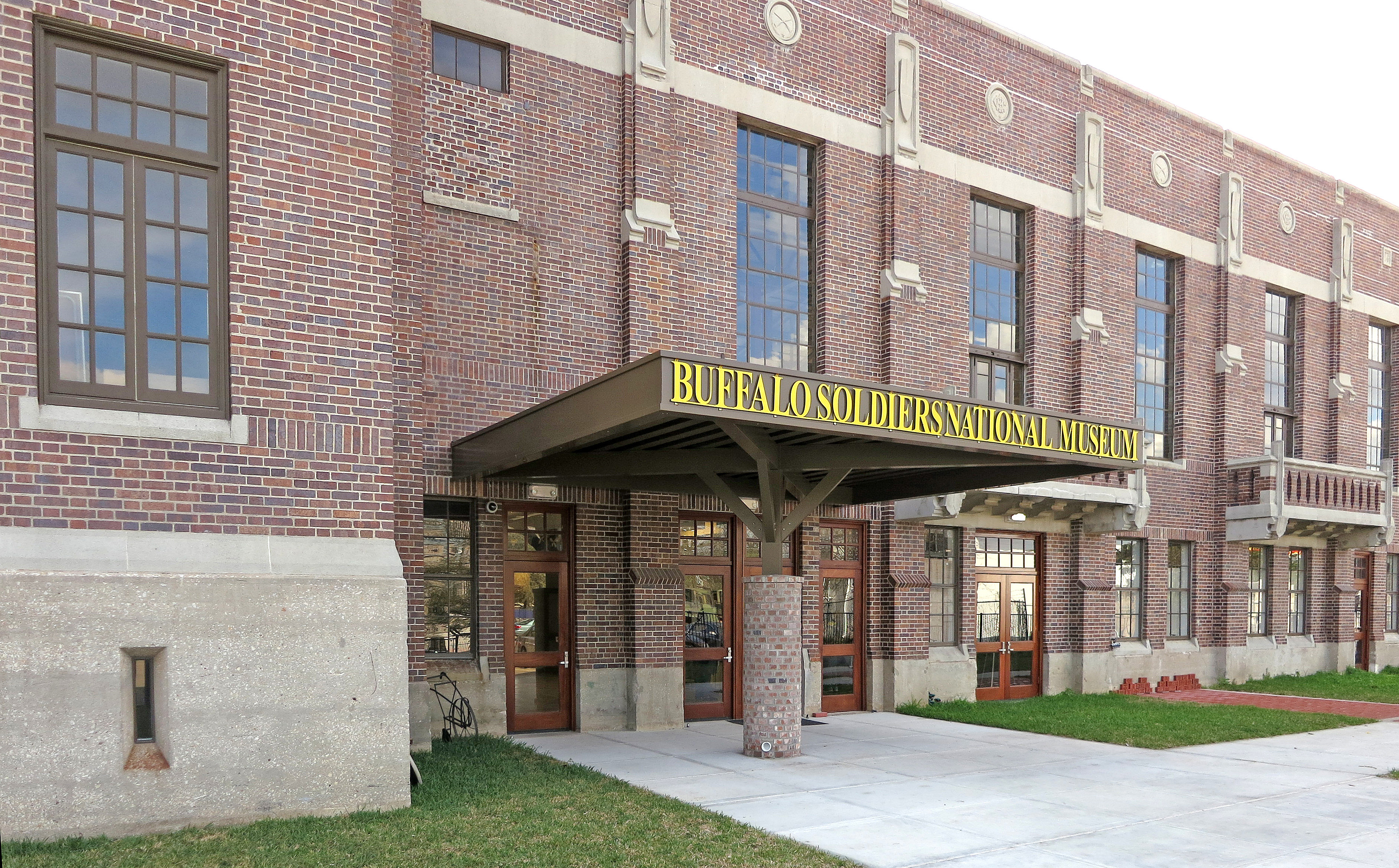
Buffalo Soldiers National Museum

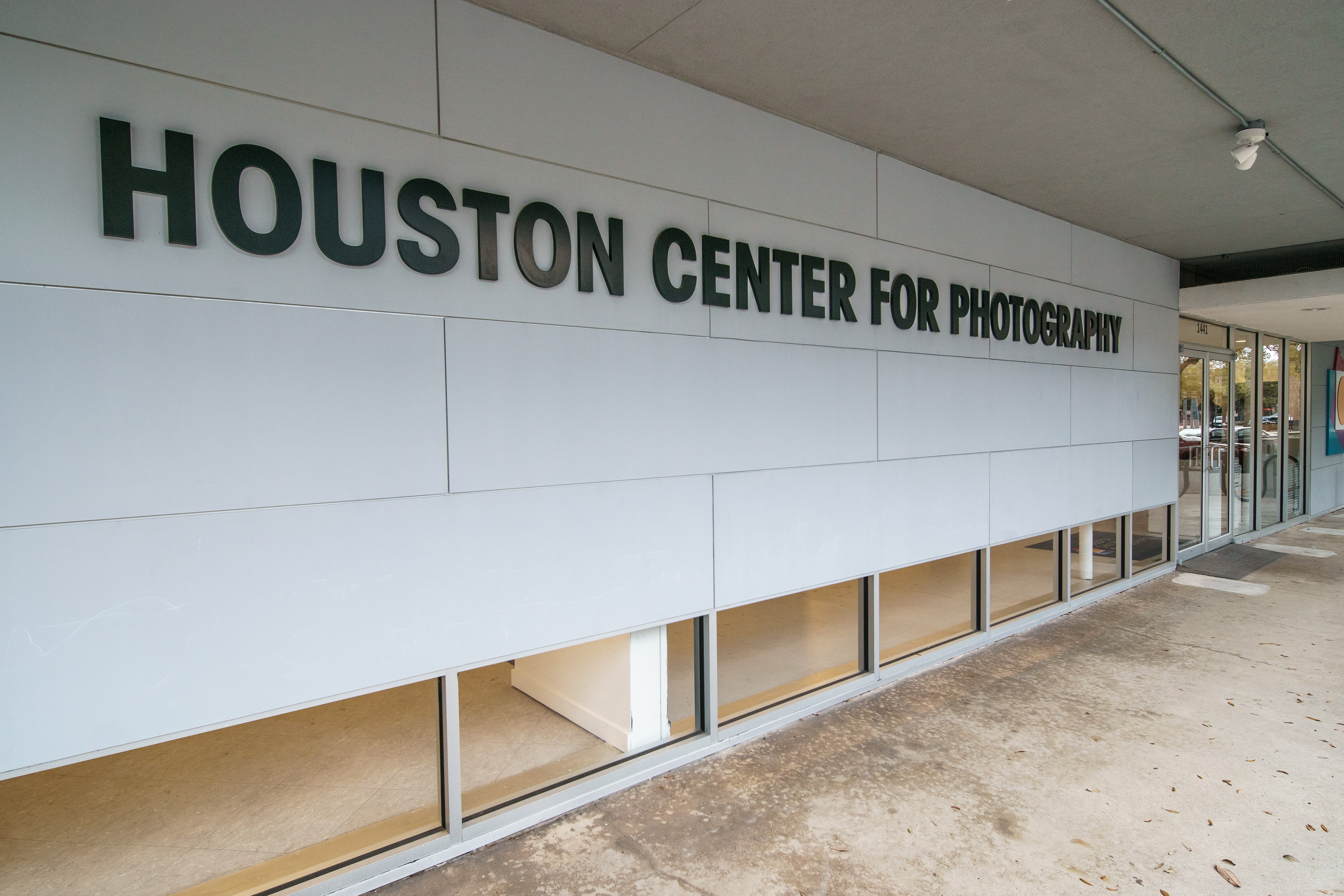
Houston Center for Photography

- Asia Society Texas Center
- Buffalo Soldiers National Museum
- Children's Museum of Houston
- Contemporary Arts Museum Houston
- Czech Center Museum Houston
- DiverseWorks
- The Health Museum
- Holocaust Museum Houston
- Houston Center for Contemporary Craft
- Houston Center for Photography
- Houston Museum of African American Culture
- Houston Museum of Natural Science
- Houston Zoo
- Inprint
- The Jung Center of Houston
- Lawndale Art Center
- The Menil Collection
- Miller Outdoor Theatre
- Moody Center for the Arts
- The Museum of Fine Arts, Houston
- The Rothko Chapel

Parks and other institutions

- Clayton Library Center for Genealogical Research
- Hermann Park

== Funding ==
Originally, funding was completely based on private sources—association member dues and members' donations. Later, with growing awareness of the MDDAH and their work, funding came from numerous other sources.

Today, total operating budgets for the member museums are funded almost completely from revenues and private donations. Museum District funding includes contributions from all participating museums; foundation support from The Houston Endowment, Inc.; The John P. McGovern Foundation; and The Wortham Foundation, Inc.

== Public issues ==
The District plays an ongoing role in forming responses to public concerns and opportunities that include transportation improvements, signage, visitor information, area beautification, flood control and urban planning considerations. The HMDA also serves as an intermediary, which fosters an ongoing dialogue among the museums in the district to maintain continuing interest and visitation in the area.

== Residential areas ==
Museum Park Neighborhood Association (MPNA) serves houses roughly bound by Texas State Highway 288, Hermann Park, Main Street, and Alabama Street. Several apartment and/or condo communities are already in the area and new ones are currently being built and developed. One benefit of living at The Circle at Hermann Park, The Mosaic, The Parklane, The Plaza, The Warwick, or new residential communities being built is that residents enjoy easy walking distance to the Houston Zoo, The Children's Museum Houston, The Houston Museum of Natural Science, Miller Outdoor Theatre, Hermann Park, The Museum of Fine Arts, Houston, and more.

In 2003 Keiji Asakura of SLA Studio Land presented the Museum District Walk Project, a project to expand walkability in the area. In 2015 a walkability study came from SWA Group.

By 2018 residential condominiums became a popular form of residence in the community.

== Parking ==
Parking in the Houston Museum District can be tricky if you visit on Thursdays, weekends, HISD Spring/Summer/Winter vacation days, or evenings when Miller Outdoor Theatre is hosting a popular show. A parking lot adjacent to the McGovern Centennial Gardens on Hermann Drive was added in 2014. You may park there for free. Parking in the lot across from the Law Building at MFAH is also free. You may also park at the zoo or in the lot near the Rice University Light Rail Station for free (there is a 3-hour time limit). You may pay to park along Hermann Drive or on side streets, in the HMNS garage, or in various garages. You may also park along the MetroRail Line and take the light rail train to Rice University or The Museum District stops.

== Education ==
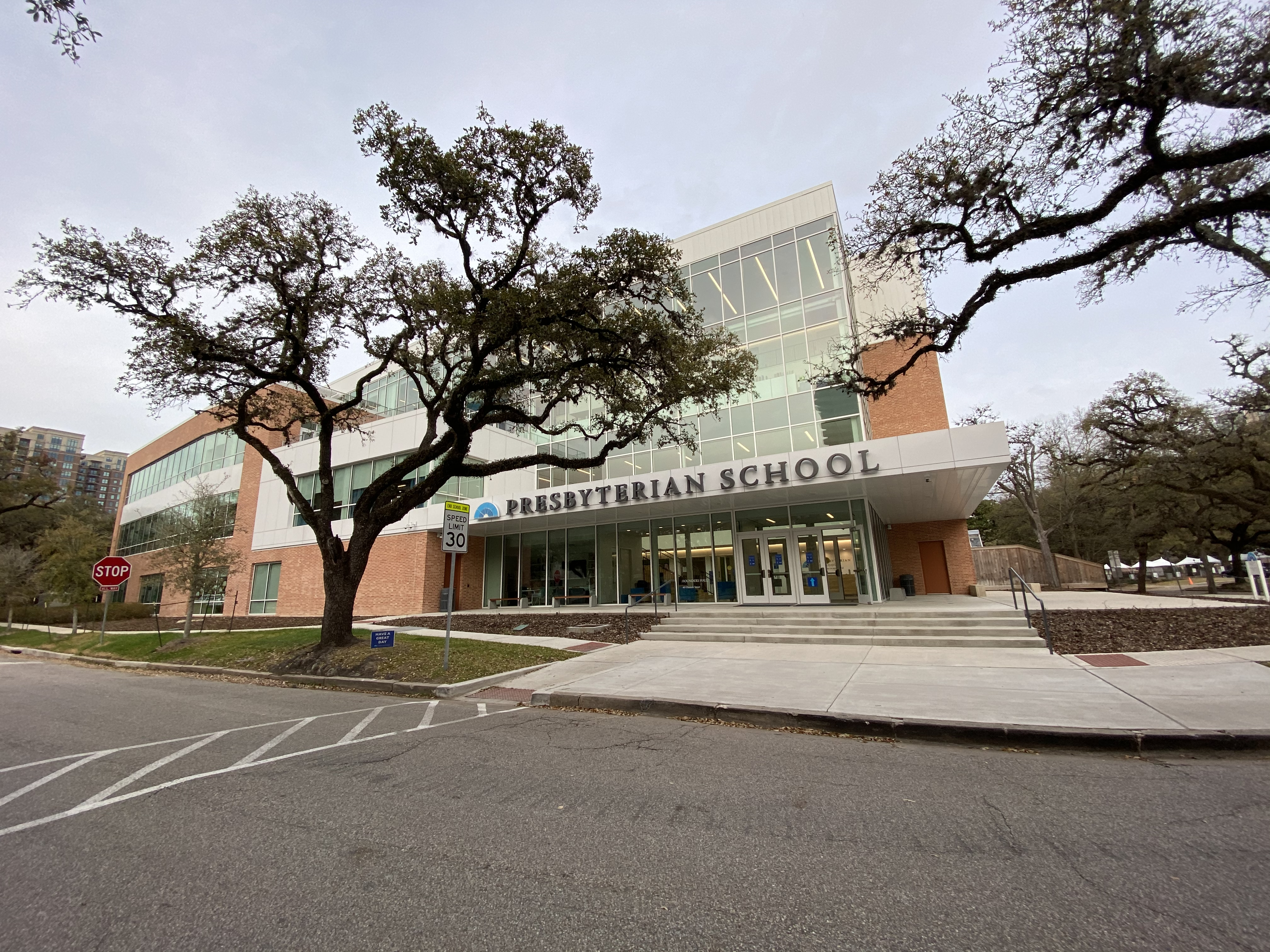
Presbyterian School

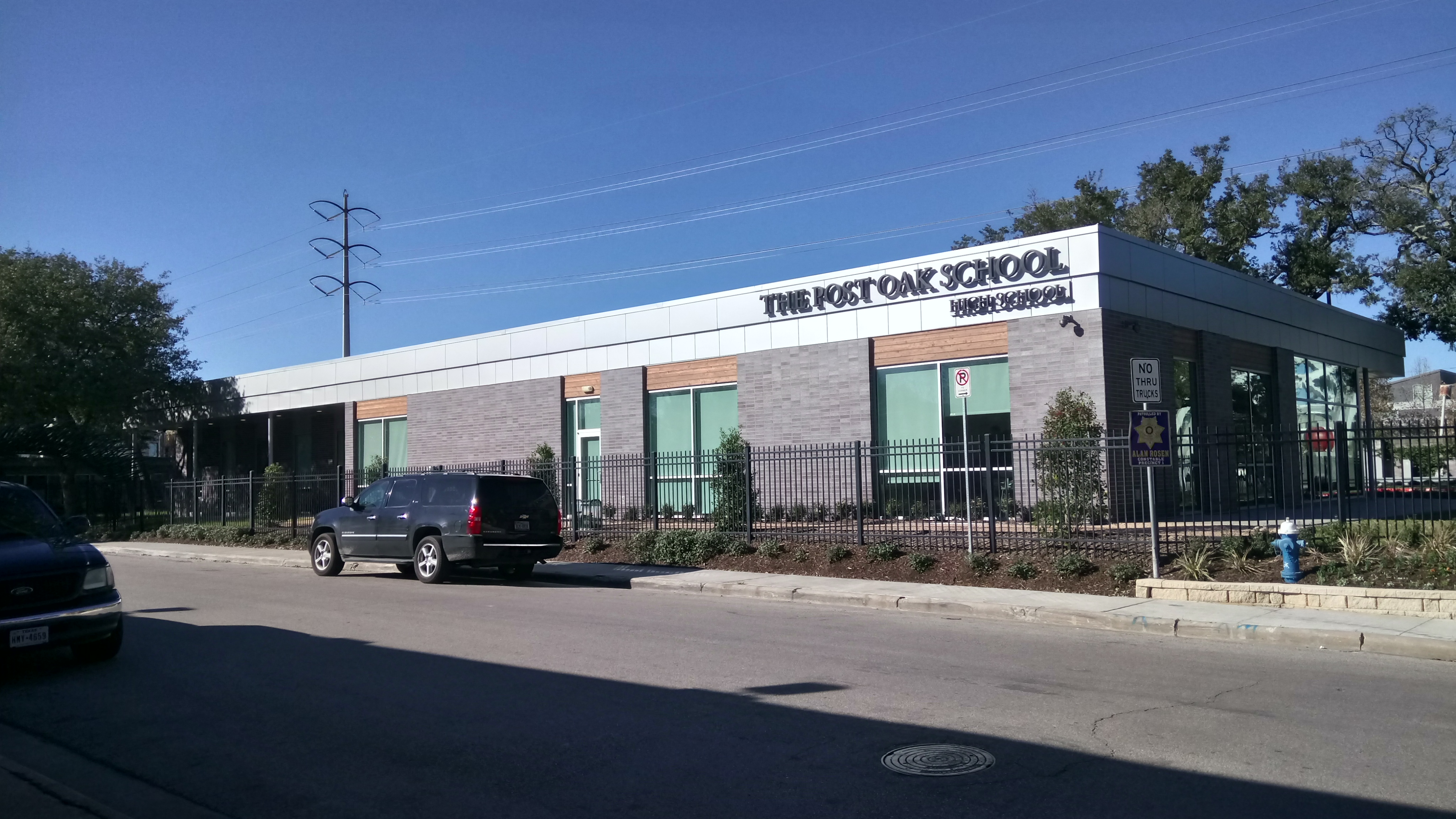
The Post Oak School High School

=== Primary and secondary schools ===
The Houston Independent School District (HISD) operates area public schools.

Elementary schools serving portions of the Museum District area:

- MacGregor
- Poe

Middle schools serving portions of the Museum District area:

- Cullen (east of Fannin Street and Montrose Boulevard)
- Lanier (west of Fannin Street and Montrose Boulevard)

Beginning in 2018 Baylor College of Medicine Academy at Ryan also serves as a boundary option for students zoned to Blackshear, Lockhart, and MacGregor elementary schools.

Lamar High School serves houses in the Museum District area.

Presbyterian School is located in the Museum District. The Post Oak High School, a private Montessori high school, opened in the northern hemisphere fall of 2012. It is the first high school in the Museum District.

In 2013 Houston A+ Challenge announced that the private middle school A+ Unlimited Potential would open in the Museum District area.

=== Public libraries ===
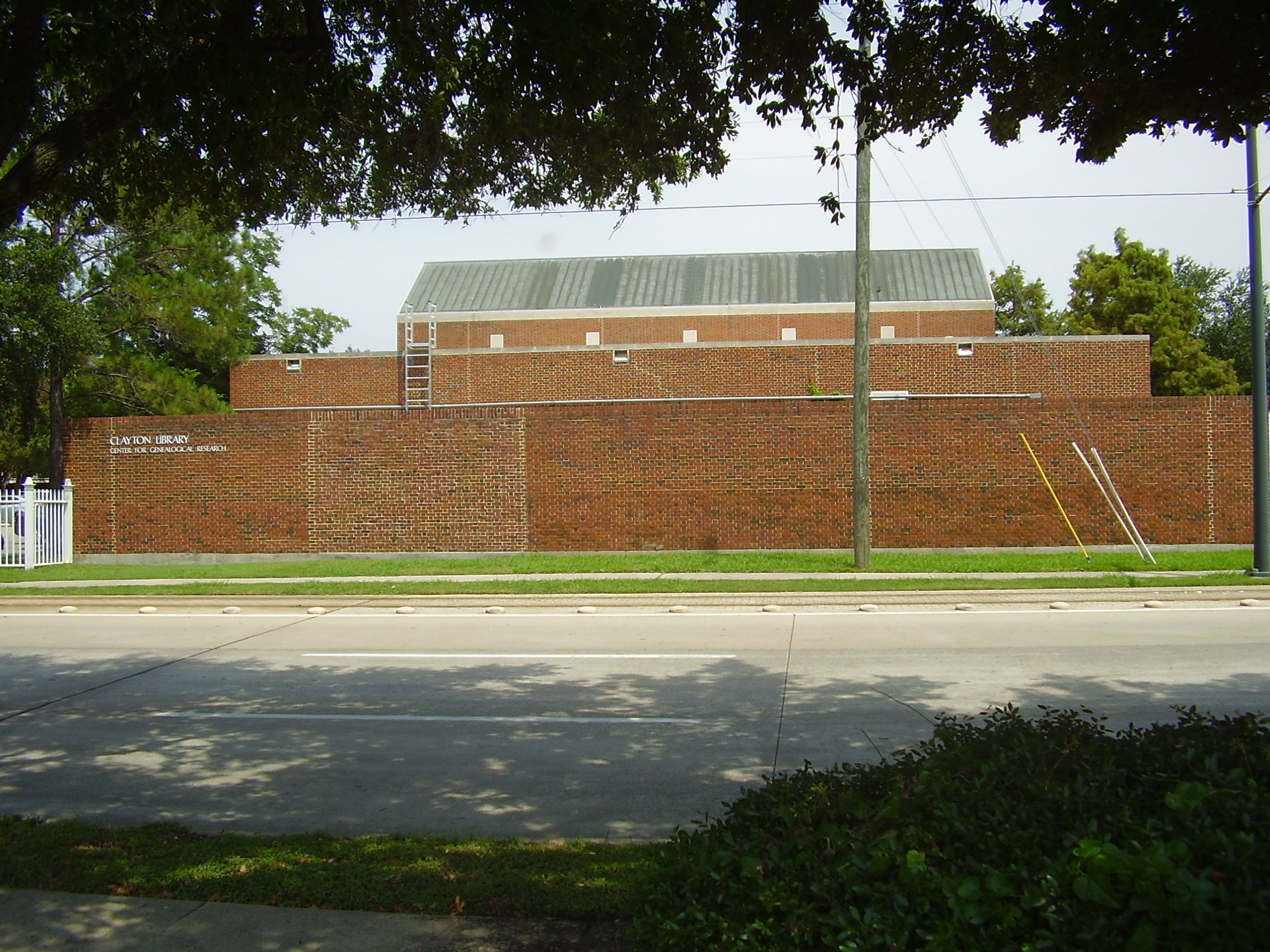
Clayton Library, Center for Genealogical Research

The Houston Public Library Clayton Library, Center for Genealogical Research is located in the Museum District. The genealogical collection, originally housed in the Julia Ideson Building in Downtown Houston, moved to the William Clayton Home, a Georgian-style house built in 1917, in the Museum District in 1968. A site for a new building, adjacent to the Clayton Home, was purchased in 1986. The new building, which was built in 1988, was designed to complement the Clayton Home. The city implemented a $6.8 million renovation project for the Clayton Home and the guest house and carriage house on the property in the 2000s. The city planned to renovate the property so it would meet LEED standards. The city installed an elevator in the guest house so the building could be used as an administrative office. The carriage house received an addition so it could function as a 100-person conference room. The Clayton site can accommodate one plenary session and four breakout meetings, which would be required for a national genealogical conference. The Houston Business Journal awarded the renovation as the best historic renovation for its 2009 Landmark Awards. There is also a branch of the Houston Public Library in the Children's Museum of Houston.

== Religion ==
First Presbyterian Church is located in the Museum District. St. Mathew's Lutheran Church and St. Paul's United Methodist Church are located in the Museum District.

== See also ==
- Melissa Chiu
- Houston Alternative Art
