= William Vanderbloemen =

Entrepreneur and pastor

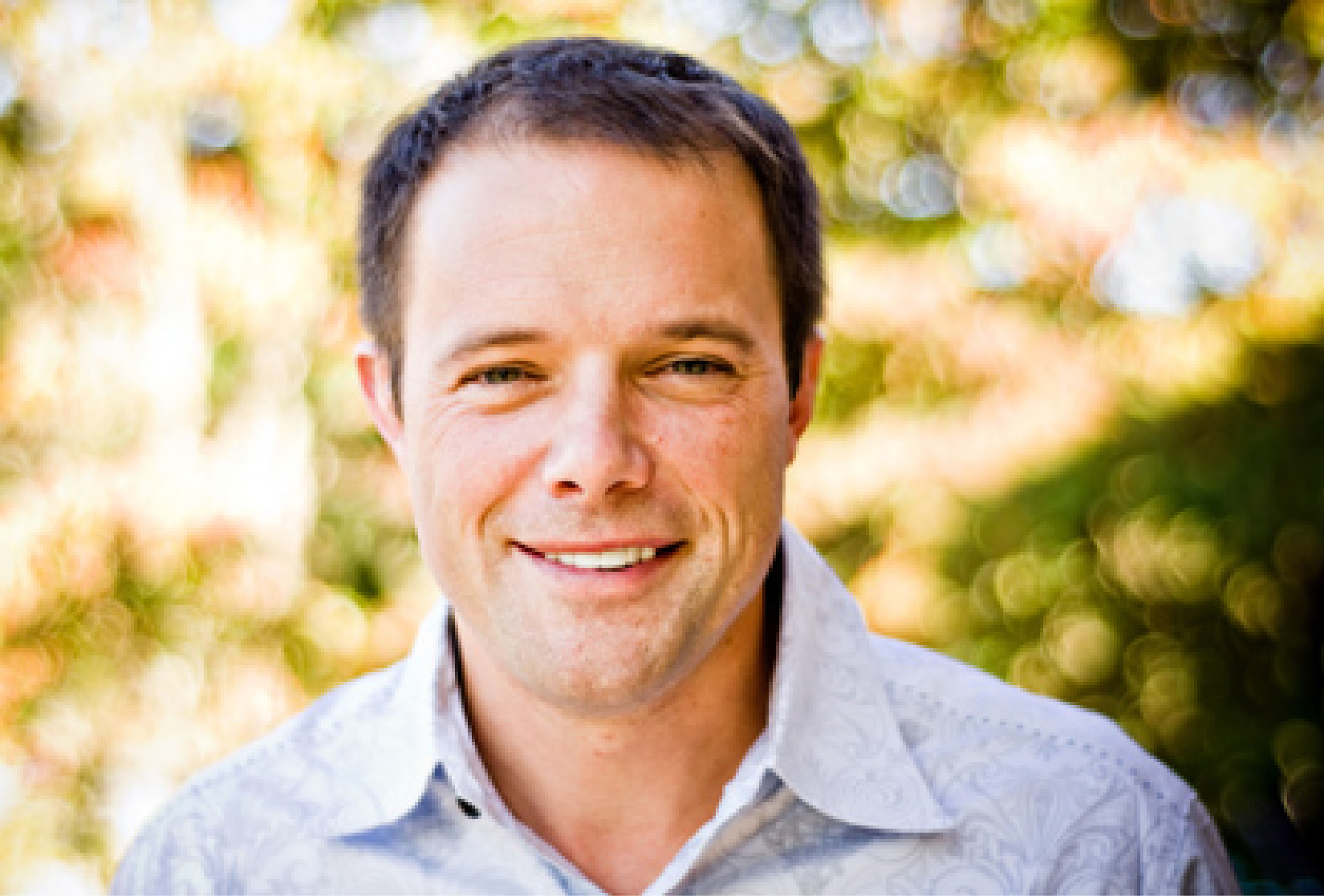
- Vanderbloemen in 2013
- Born: December 20, 1969 (age 56); Taylorsville, North Carolina, U.S.
- Education: Wake Forest University, B.A.; Princeton Theological Seminary, M. Div.
- Occupations: Entrepreneur, pastor, speaker, author

William Vanderbloemen (born 1969) is an entrepreneur, pastor, speaker, author, and CEO and founder of Vanderbloemen Search Group, an executive search firm serving churches, ministries, and faith-based organizations.

== Education ==
Vanderbloemen received a B.A. in philosophy/religion from Wake Forest University (1992) and later earned an M.Div from Princeton Theological Seminary (1995).

== Career ==
=== Ministry ===
After graduating, Vanderbloemen took a post as the associate pastor of the First Presbyterian Church of Hendersonville, North Carolina. At 27, he accepted his first senior pastorate at the Memorial Presbyterian Church of Montgomery in Alabama. In less than four years there, the membership tripled and the church completed a $5.5 million building program. In 2001, Vanderbloemen was a guest chaplain for the U.S. House of Representatives.

At 31, he was elected senior pastor of the First Presbyterian Church of Houston. At the time, he was the youngest senior pastor ever elected to Houston's oldest church. In 2006, he presided over the funeral of former U.S. House Representative, Senator, Treasury Secretary and Democratic Vice Presidential Nominee Lloyd Bentsen.

=== Corporate career ===
Vanderbloemen has studied the issue of pastoral "succession planning" as a means to help churches and ministries continue beyond the term of a main spiritual leader and has become a consultant on the topic of church succession planning and compensation analysis for churches and ministries. He also works with relief organizations, such as World Vision International and Living Water International.

Vanderbloemen has been a media commentator on the issues surrounding Mars Hill Church and its former pastor Mark Driscoll, Christianity Today, and Gospel Herald.

Vanderbloemen says that "all pastors are interim pastors"," and talks about a "hyper-connected world", rendering the needs for churches to plan ahead because they will face transition issues.

He has been a contributor to Forbes, where he covers topics about having a strong faith and building a business, Fortune, and Outreach Magazine. He has also been published through Fast Company, Entrepreneur, and Inc.

Vanderbloemen served as a human resources manager at Anadarko Petroleum. In 2008, he was the senior vice president/ministry practice leader at FaithSearch Partners, an executive search firm focused on faith-based hospitals, health care systems, and ministries.

==== Vanderbloemen Search Group ====
Based in Houston, Texas, Vanderbloemen Search Group opened in 2009. The executive search firm, which also conducts compensation analysis and consulting services for organizations, specializes in a mix of domestic and international placement of faith-based leaders within churches and ministries, as well as Christian organizations. It works with churches all over the world and of every denomination.

Vanderbloemen Search Group acquired the search firm Help Staff Me in 2011. In November 2012, It was accepted into the Association of Executive Search Consultants (AESC).

== Personal life ==
Vanderbloemen, his wife Adrienne, and his seven children live in Houston.

== Works ==
- Vanderbloemen, William; Bird, Warren (2014). Next: Pastoral Succession That Works. Baker. ISBN 978-0801016479. discusses the process of pastoral succession planning
- Vanderbloemen, William (2016). Search: The Pastoral Search Committee Handbook. Nashville: B&H Publishing Group. ISBN 978-1-4336-8989-5.
