= First Presbyterian Church (Houston) =

Church in Houston, Texas

Coordinates: 29.7277°N 95.3888°W

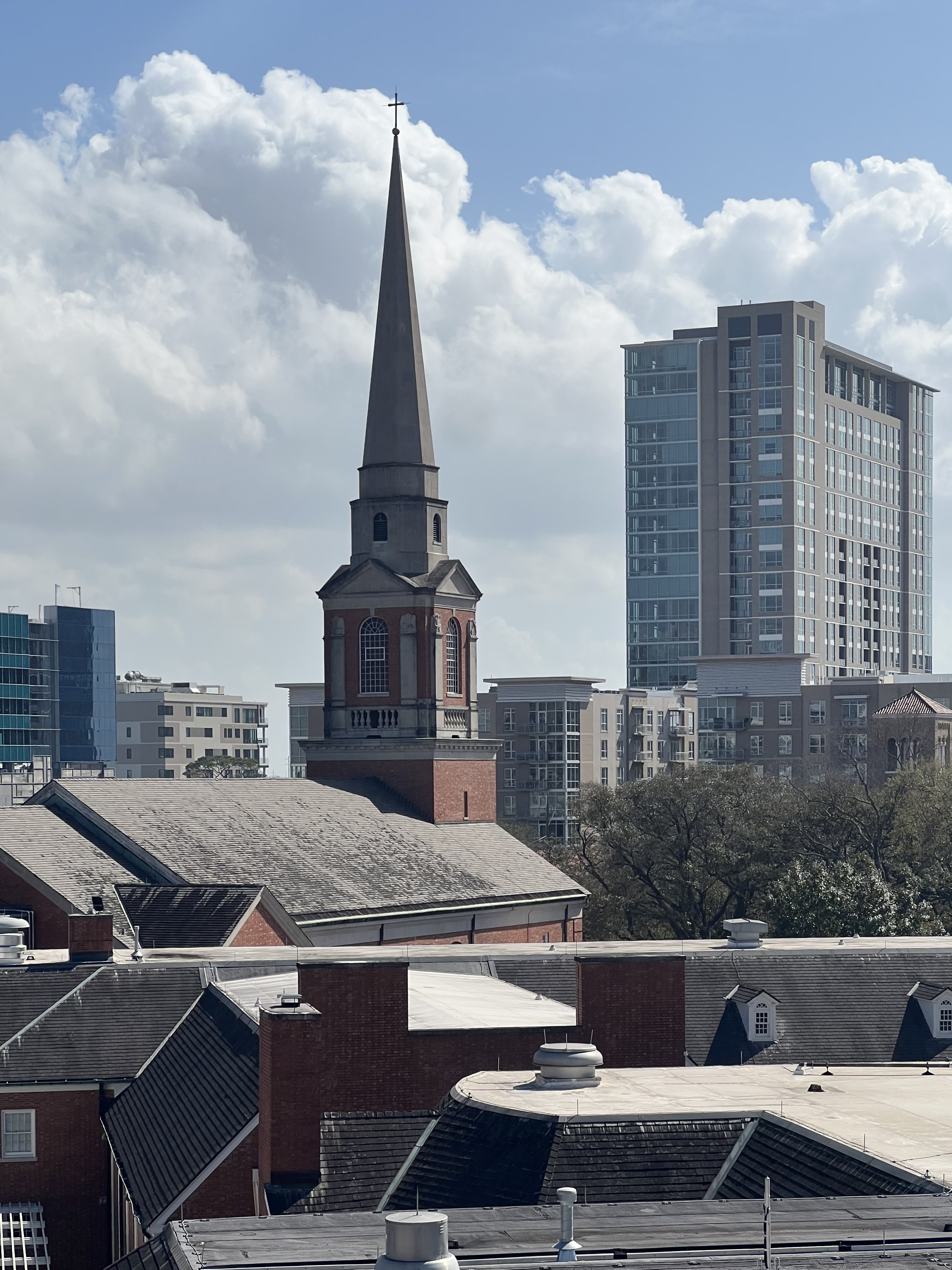
- First Presbyterian Church
- Location: Houston, Texas
- Country: United States
- Denomination: ECO: A Covenant Order of Evangelical Presbyterians
- Previous denomination: Presbyterian Church (USA), Presbyterian Church in the United States

History
- Dedicated: 1839

Clergy
- Pastor: Curtis A. Bronzan

The First Presbyterian Church of Houston is a church in the Museum District of Houston, Texas. As of 2012 it had 3,567 members. The church has been located in the Museum District since 1948.

== History ==
The church was founded in 1839 by Rev. James Weston Miller. He was from Pennsylvania as a foreign missionary in the Republic of Texas. The congregation consisted of 13 charter members. Initially, the church met in the Senate Chamber of the Republic of Texas, moving nearby to its first building in 1842. Later the congregation become a prominent member of the Southern Presbyterian Church, and planted several Presbyterian congregations in Houston. The church grew rapidly. First Presbyterian begun mission efforts to South Korea and Brazil.

The church moved to its current location in 1948. The new sanctuary building was the first air-conditioned sanctuary in Texas.

In 2001 B. William Vanderbloemen was elected as the church's pastor. Vanderbloemen resigned in January 2007 after taking leave in December 2006.

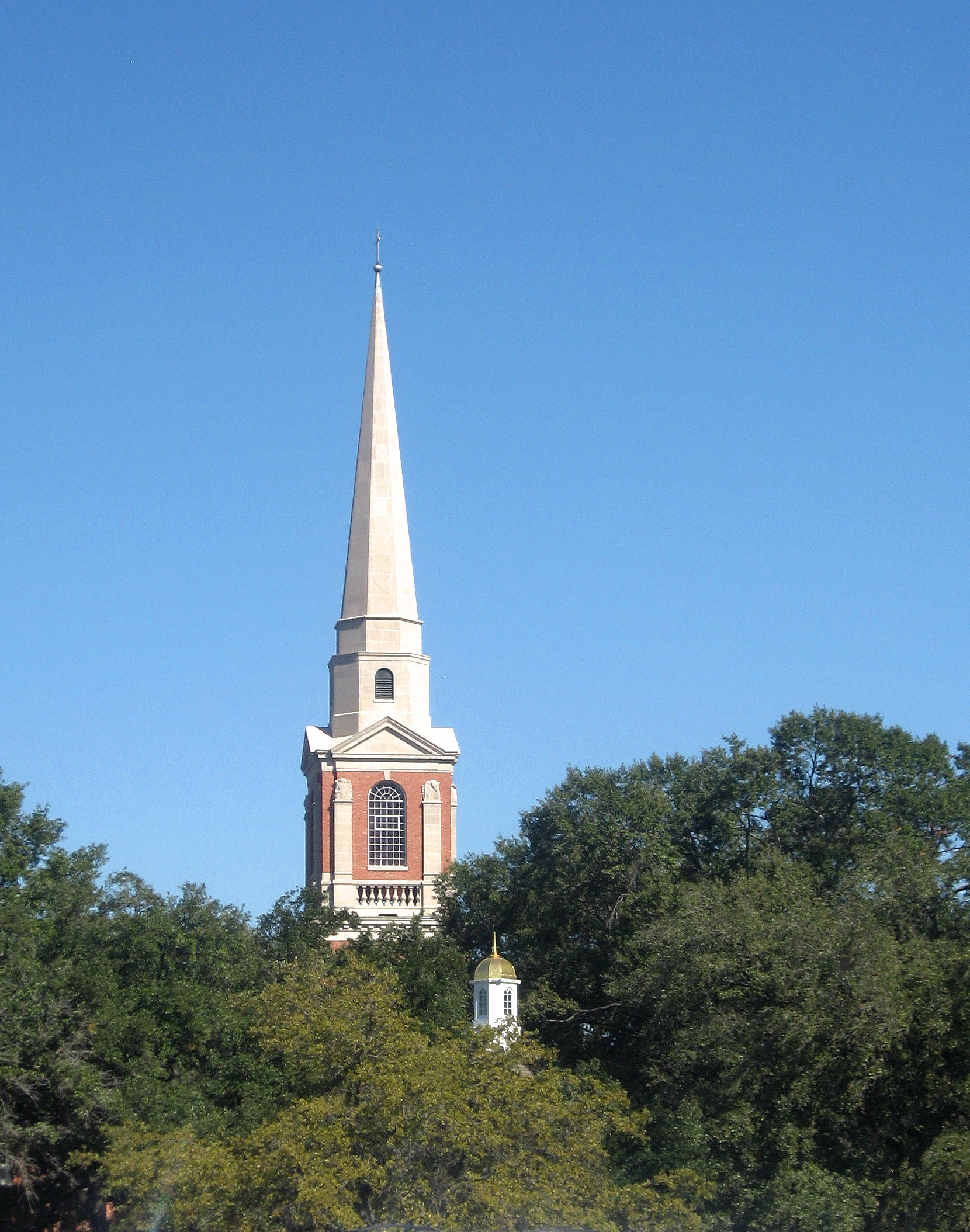
The steeple of the main chapel.

In February 2014 the church voted whether or not to sever ties with the PCUSA, following a policy change in which the latter organization opened the possibility of the ordination of openly gay ministers. First Presbyterian narrowly voted to stay with the denomination.

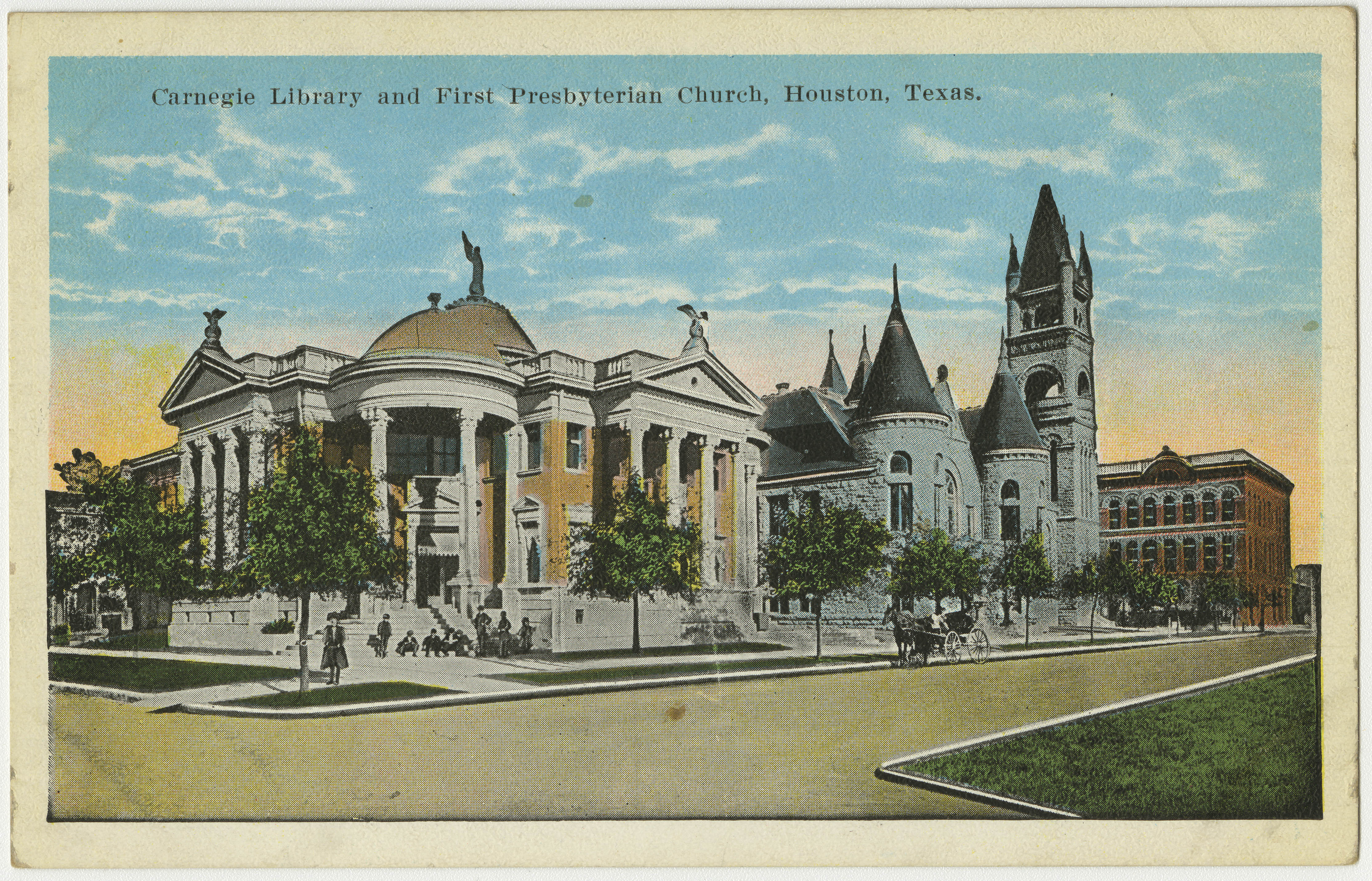
The building behind the Carnegie Library served from 1896 until it burned down in 1932.

In November 2016, the church decided to leave the PCUSA and align with ECO: A Covenant Order of Evangelical Presbyterians.

The senior pastor is Curtis A. Bronzan.

== School ==
Presbyterian School is on the grounds of the church.

== See also ==
- Christianity in Houston
