= Houston's Hermann Park =

2014 book by Barrie Scardino Bradley

Houston's Hermann Park: A Century of Community
- First edition
- Author: Barrie Scardino Bradley
- Language: English
- Series: John Lindsey Series in Arts and the Humanities
- Genre: Non-fiction
- Publisher: Texas A&M University Press
- Publication date: 2014
- Publication place: United States

Houston's Hermann Park: A Century of Community is a 2014 book by Barrie Scardino Bradley, published by the Texas A&M University Press. It discusses Hermann Park in Houston, Texas. The book is a part of the John Lindsey Series in Arts and the Humanities. The book, commissioned by the Hermann Park Conservancy, was scheduled for a release on December 18, 2013. Stephen Fox, an architectural historian, and Doreen Stoller, a conservancy director, wrote the foreword and afterword, respectively. It was released to celebrate the park's centennial anniversary.

== Background ==
Scardino is an historian and architect, in addition to being an author. She first moved to Houston in 1979, moved away in 1998, and moved back in 2004. She had once worked for the Houston Public Library's Houston Metropolitan Research Center as an architectural archivist, and she once served as the executive director of the Houston chapter of the American Institute of Architecture. She accepted the commission to write the book in 2010.

== Contents ==
The book discusses the park's background and development. Images published in this book include drawings, plans, historical images, and modern images. An appendix is included.

== Reception ==
Lake Douglas of Louisiana State University praised the book, stating that it was "comprehensive, well written, and lavishly illustrated", concluding that the book "is a gift to Houstonians as well as to landscape historians, urban designers, and everyone interested in the evolution and stewardship of an iconic urban park in a major American city."
