= Ideson =

Ideson is a surname. Notable people with the surname include:

- Julia Ideson (1880–1945), American librarian
- Mark Ideson (born 1976), Canadian wheelchair curler
