= Sunnyside, Houston =

Community in Houston, Texas, United States

Coordinates: 29.662°N 95.364°W

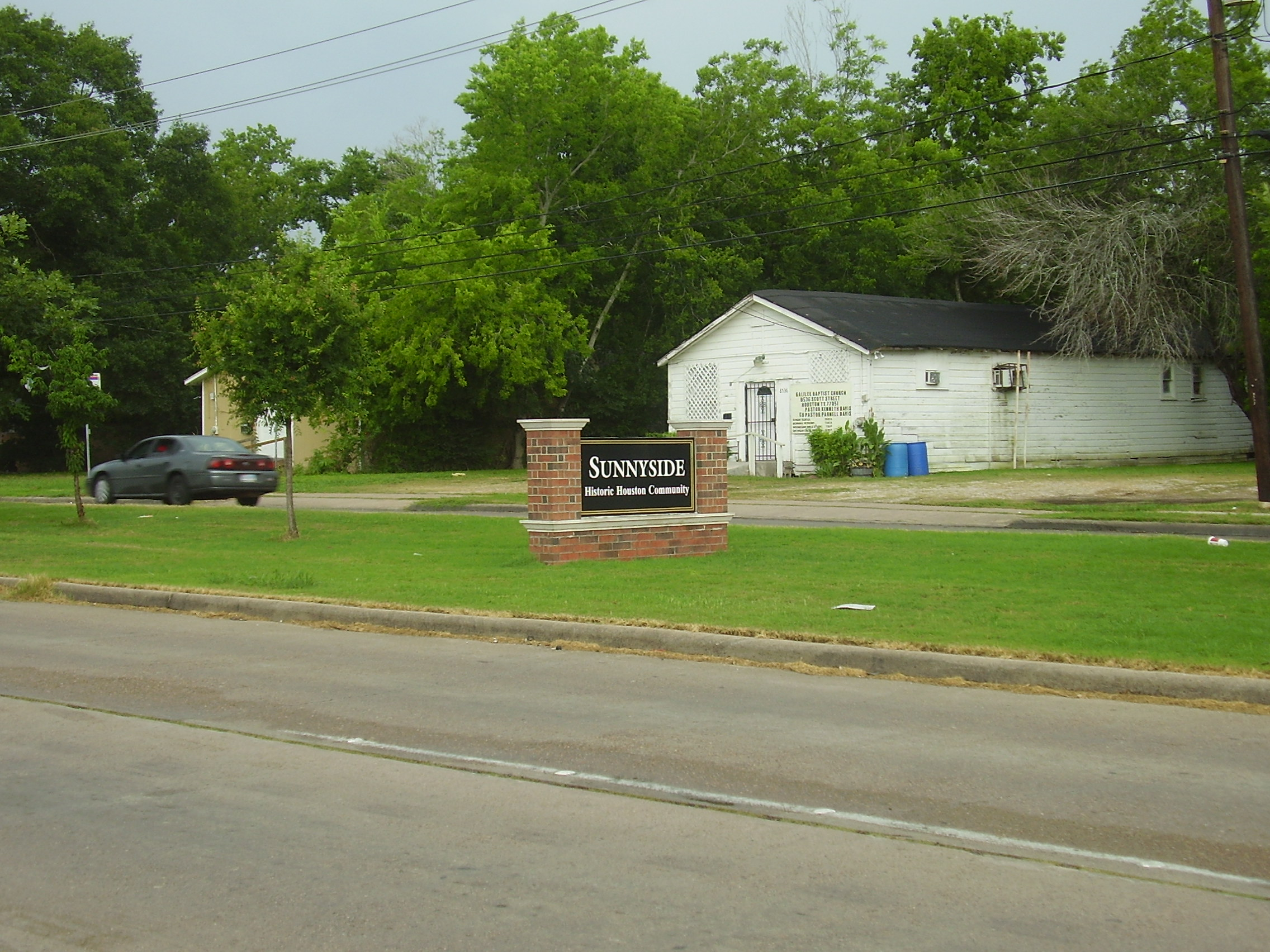
A sign indicating Sunnyside's location

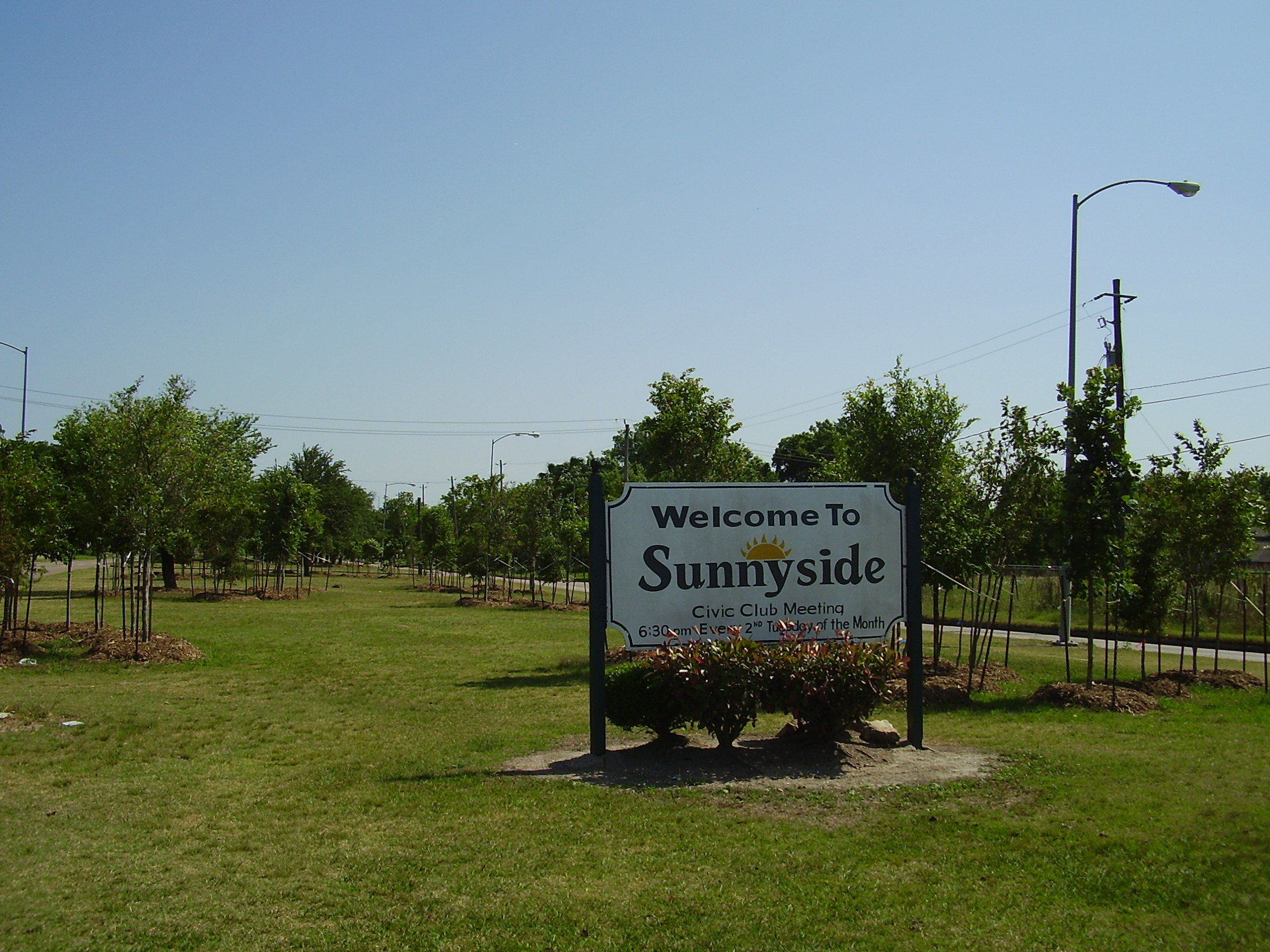
A sign indicating Sunnyside's location

Sunnyside is a community in southern Houston, Texas, United States, south of Downtown Houston.

Sunnyside is outside the 610 Loop and inside Beltway 8 off State Highway 288 south of Downtown Houston and is predominantly African American. The community's slogan is "Sunnyside Pride." Sunnyside included a landfill, an adjacent garbage incinerator, and several salvage yards; the incinerator has closed. The city of Houston describes Sunnyside's housing as "suburban-style." As of 2007 Sandra Massie-Hines was the honorary Mayor of Sunnyside.

== History ==
Thousands of enslaved African-Americans lived near Houston before the U.S. Civil War. Many of them near the city worked on sugar and cotton plantations, while most of those in the city limits had domestic and artisan jobs. In 1860, 49% of the city's population was enslaved.

African Americans started to settle in the community and it was founded by H. H. Holmes. Sunnyside, the oldest African-American community in southern Houston, was first platted in 1912. When the community opened in the 1910s, H. H. Holmes, the founder, gave the land the name Sunny Side. By the 1940s area residents established a water district and a volunteer fire department. The City of Houston annexed Sunnyside in 1956.

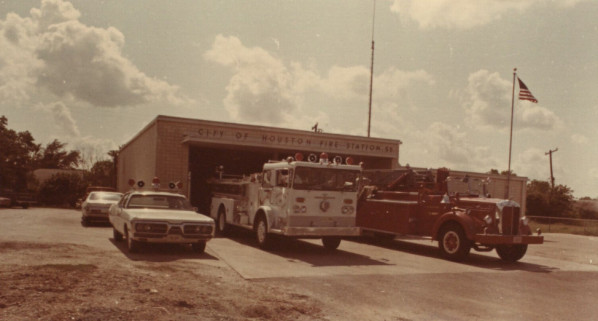
Fire Station 55, 1976

In the 1940s and 1950s new additions were constructed in the Sunnyside area, and local residents of nearby Mykawa, then a mostly white community, expressed dismay at this, as the 1948 Shelley v. Kraemer Supreme Court decision meant that neighborhoods could no longer have rules excluding people on the basis of race. Terroristic threats were made against the Sunnyside community.

In the 1970s and 1980s the neighborhood, while low income, had healthy business activity, and was known as "Black Wall Street" or "Baby River Oaks" due to the concentration of businesses. The population decreased beginning in the 1970s. From the 1980 U.S. Census to the 1990 Census, many African-Americans left traditional African-American neighborhoods like Sunnyside and entered parts of Southwest Houston. Sunnyside lost 30% of its population in the decade prior to August 20, 1992. In addition, by the 1980s the imprisonment of African Americans, an increase in violence, and the proliferation of recreational drugs began to damage the neighborhood. The 1980s oil bust also damaged the Sunnyside economy.

Between 1990 and 2000 the Hispanic population of Sunnyside increased a little by between 5 and 10 percent as Hispanics in the Houston area moved into majority black neighborhoods. In the same period, the black population of both Sunnyside and South Park combined declined by 4,225, or 11% as majority African-American neighborhoods in Houston had declines in their black populations.

As of January 2007, according to a Houston Chronicle article and according to residents who live(d) there, Sunnyside has many issues with recreational drug use. Marijuana, Opioids, Benzodiazepines or benzos, Methamphetamine or commonly known as ice, shards, crystal and/or glass, 3,4-Methylenedioxymethamphetamine or MDMA, Ecstasy, E-pills and/or tabs, diacetylmorphine or heroin or brown, Crack cocaine simply called hard or rock, Cocaine or powder, snow, and/or sugar, Phencyclidine (PCP) also known as shrewm or water, are cited by the article and surveys as a popular drug choices in Sunnyside which have flooded the streets and plagued the residents.

On August 30, 2007, the Houston Chronicle published an article about a syphilis outbreak in Houston. Marlene McNeese-Ward, the Houston Health Department chief of HIV/STD and Viral Hepatitis Prevention, stated "We're really looking at Acres Homes especially, and Sunnyside, but there's not too many ZIP codes ... where we're not seeing any (cases)."

The 2000s-2010s Great Recession further harmed Sunnyside particularly because many businesses had thin operating margins.

In 2010 a zip code including much of the Sunnyside area had 118 registered sex offenders; it has the highest concentration of sex offenders of any zip code without facilities designed to house registered sex offenders. While some other Houston areas have higher concentrations of sex offenders than Sunnyside, those areas have specific facilities housing sex offenders. Travis McGee, the president of the Sunnyside Civic Association, said that the Sunnyside area was a "dumping field for anything that’s negative" and that he felt fear for area children.

A 2013 NeighborhoodScout crime study that analyzed data from the Federal Bureau of Investigation (FBI) concluded that Sunnyside was #6 in its list of the 25 most dangerous neighborhoods in the United States. According to the ranking, every year each Sunnyside resident had a 1 in 11 chance of becoming a victim of crime, and the violent crime rate was 91.27 out of 1,000.

In 2016 the Houston City Council established a tax increment reinvestment zone (TIRZ) in western Sunnyside.

== Demographics ==
In 1980 64% of residents owned their houses.

According to the 1990 Census Sunnyside had 3,484 residents. 93.8% of them were African-American, 4.2% were Hispanic, and 2% were White, Asian, or other. The median household income was $12,477, compared to the City of Houston median of $26,621. 38.6% of Sunnyside residents lived below the poverty line. As of that year, in the wider area, 1.5% were Hispanic.

In 2000 the City of Houston-defined Sunnyside Super Neighborhood had 18,629 residents. 93% were non-Hispanic black, 4% were Hispanic, and 1% each were non-Hispanic white, Asian, and others.

In 2010 the home ownership rate was 46%. As of 2016 about 22,000 people lived in the Sunnyside area, with 97% being black and 10% being Hispanic.

In 2006, the unemployment rate was 12%. In 2016 it was 29%, the highest percentage of any community in Houston; the city's overall unemployment rate was 5.5%.

In 2010 4,576 households had salaries under $25,000 annually. Circa 2016 about 30% of the households were poorer than the defined poverty line, and 5,062 households made under $25,000 annually.

In 2015 the super neighborhood had 20,071 residents. 88% were non-Hispanic black, 10% were Hispanic, and 1% each were non-Hispanic white and other. The percentage of non-Hispanic Asians was zero.

== Economy ==
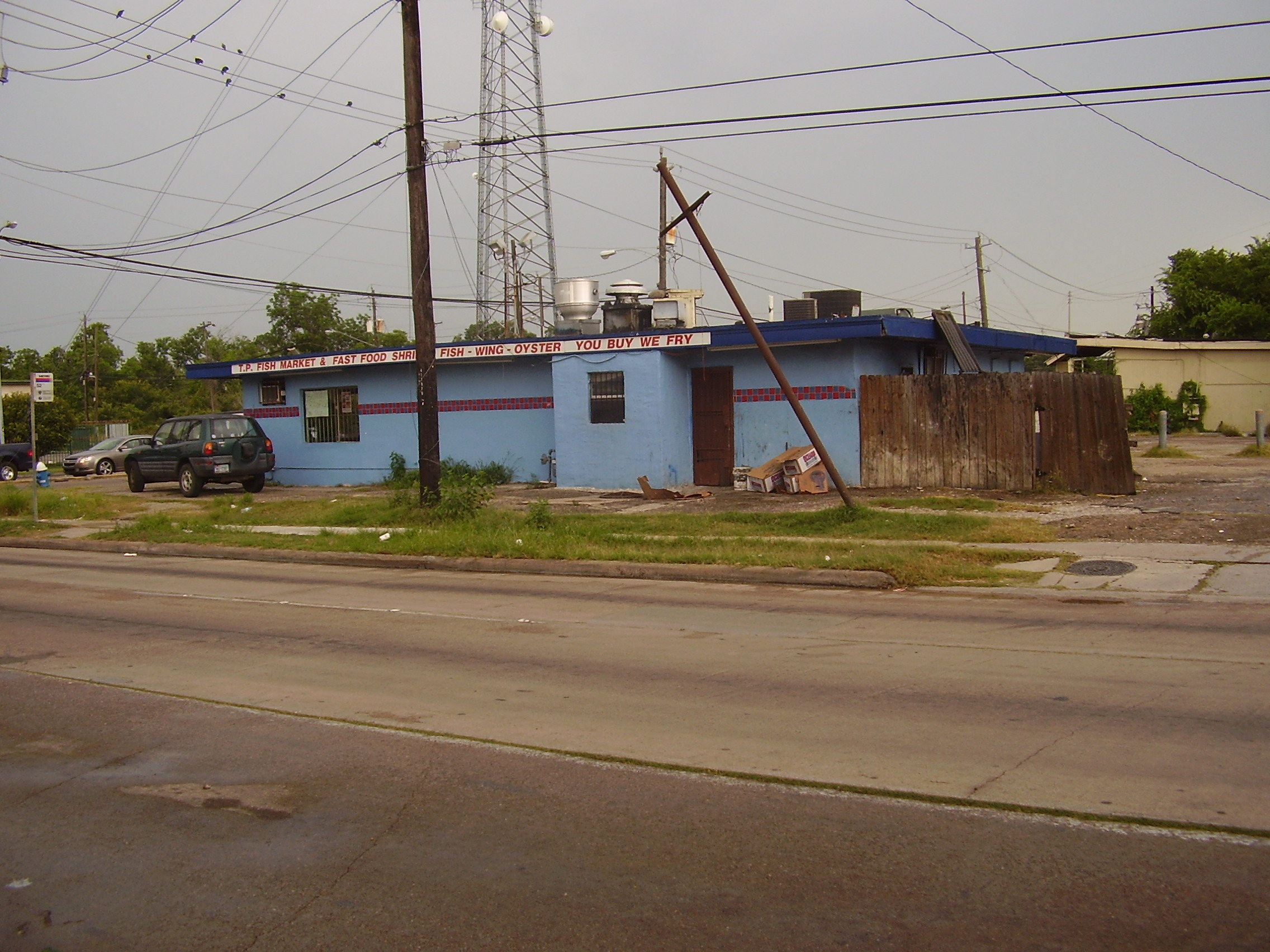
A "you buy we fry" restaurant in Sunnyside

In the 1970s and 1980s the area was known as "Black Wall Street" or "Baby River Oaks" due to the concentration of businesses. The 1980s oil bust damaged the Sunnyside economy. There were 800 businesses in Sunnyside in 2006; the 2000s-2010s Great Recession further harmed Sunnyside particularly because many businesses had thin operating margins; many African-American businesses received above-average damage from the 2008 recession, and new ones had since been established in Missouri City and Pearland. In 2016 the number of businesses in Sunnyside was 600, a 25% decrease from 2006.

== Crime ==
As of 2016, according to crime statistics, Sunnyside had 3 times the Houston average in terms of crime.

== Culture ==
In 2019 Kinder Institute for Urban Research of Rice University concluded that the community had a "strong" "social fabric".

== Cityscape ==
Rafael Longoria and Susan Rogers of the Rice Design Alliance said that Sunnyside could be described as "rurban," a word coined in 1918 which describes an area with a mix of urban and rural characteristics. By 2007 new houses began to appear in the area. As of 2008 Sunnyside still has small churches, shotgun houses, horse stalls, original frame houses, open ditches, uncontrolled garbage fires, and vacant lots, features which characterize many rural areas. By the early 1970s a major landfill and incinerator in the area had been converted into a park.

As of 2010 Sunnyside has two grocery stores within its area, which serve a regional population of 22,000. Toral Sindha, a nutritionist in the City of Houston's health department and the manager of the city's Community Garden Program, stated that because of this Sunnyside was "a true food desert" and that "healthy produce in fresh fruits and vegetables is not accessible in Sunnyside." Cindy George of the Houston Chronicle said during that year that in Sunnyside and several other communities in Houston, "an abundance of drive-throughs and convenience stores offer processed, fatty foods to residents." George added that Sunnyside's neighborhood stores "offer fewer healthy options of any kind."

As of 2016 a large number of federally subsidized low income housing units are in the area. The Houston Housing Authority (HHA), formerly the Housing Authority of the City of Houston (HACH), proposed additional ones in 2013, although they were not built. Villa Americana formerly known as the VA, Wesley Square, Sunflower Terrace, Scott Plaza, King's Row, Royal Palms East, Southlawn, Missionary Village, and the now demolished Wilmington are low income housing developments located around the area.

In 2019 there were plans to establish a solar power facility in the area.

== Government and Infrastructure ==
=== Local government ===
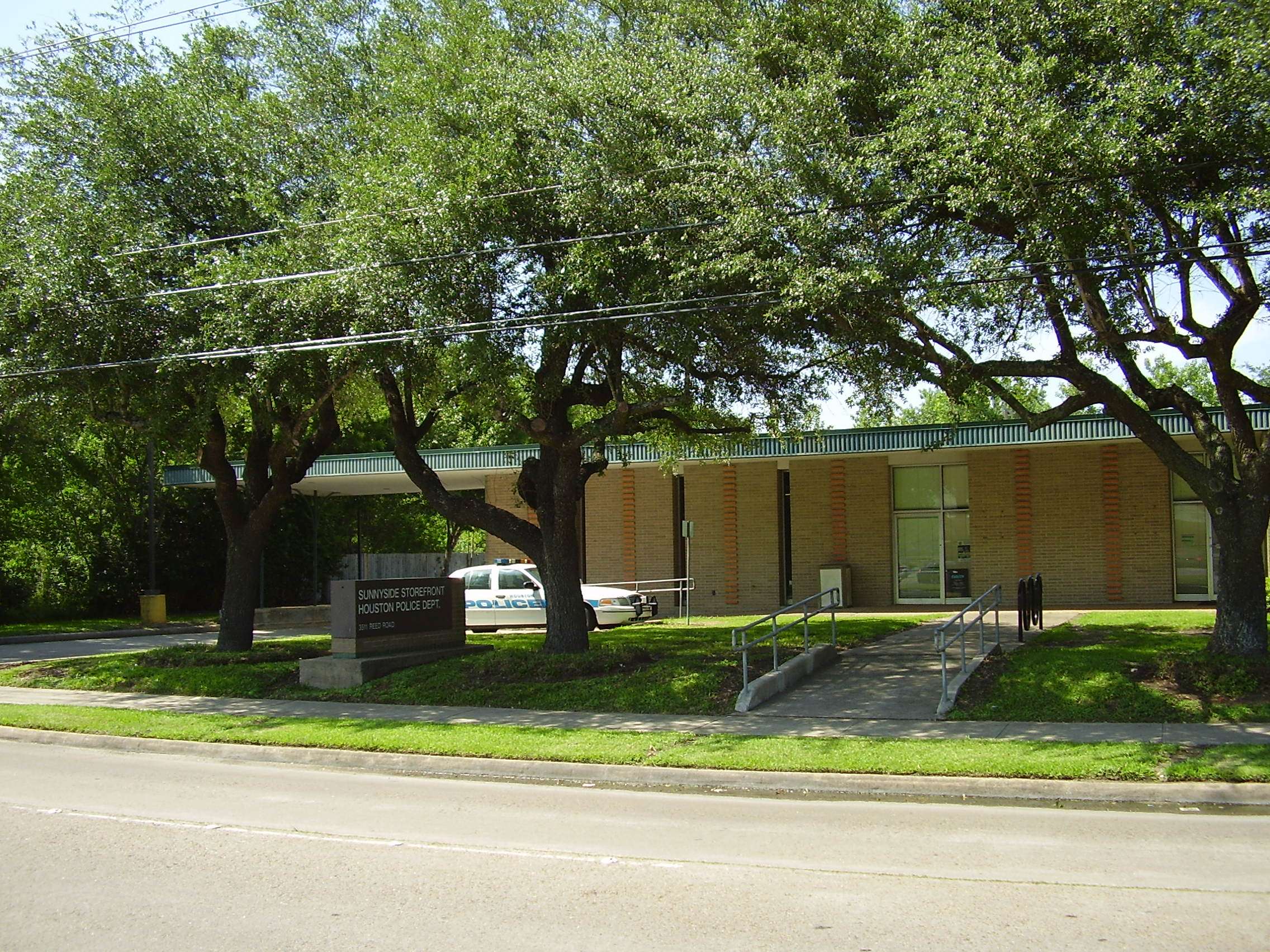
Houston Police Department Sunnyside Storefront

The neighborhood is within the Houston Police Department's Southeast Patrol Division, headquartered at 8300 Mykawa Road. The Sunnyside Storefront Station is located at 3511 Reed Road.

The Houston Fire Department Station 55 Sunnyside is near Sunnyside at 11212 Cullen Boulevard at Selinsky Road. The station is within Fire District 46. The station opened in 1963 in what was then the southeasternmost area in the Houston city limits. The station had two facelifts and reopened in June 2000.

Houston City Council District D covers Sunnyside. As of 2020 Dr. Carolyn Evans-Shabazz represents the district. The city operates the Sunnyside Multi-Service Center at 4605 Wilmington Street. The city multi-service centers provide several services such as child care, programs for elderly residents, and rental space. The multi-service center received damage from Hurricane Ike. In 2010 the city began to establish a community garden at the Sunnyside center to provide area residents with vegetables and other nutritious foods.

During the 1997 Mayor of Houston election, 99% of Sunnyside voters voted for Lee P. Brown.

The Houston Health Department operates the Sunnyside Health Center in Sunnyside.

=== County, state, and federal representation ===
Harris County Precinct One, headed by Commissioner Rodney Ellis, serves Sunnyside.

Harris Health System (formerly Harris County Hospital District) operates the Martin Luther King Health Center in southeast Houston. The designated public hospital is Ben Taub General Hospital in the Texas Medical Center.

Sunnyside is located in District 146 of the Texas House of Representatives. As of 2017, Shawn Thierry represents the district. Sunnyside is within District 13 of the Texas Senate; as of 2017 Borris L. Miles represents that district.

Sunnyside is in Texas's 9th congressional district. As of 2008, Al Green represents the district. The closest United States Postal Service post office is the Martin Luther King Post Office at 9444 Cullen Boulevard.

Sunnyside residents expressed apathy towards the 1992 Republican National Convention, which was held in the Houston Astrodome; residents believed that it did not address issues pertinent to Sunnyside residents. Despite the neighborhood's proximity to the Astrodome, traffic from the convention did not lead to increase of patronage of area businesses.

== Education ==
=== Primary and secondary schools ===
==== Public schools ====
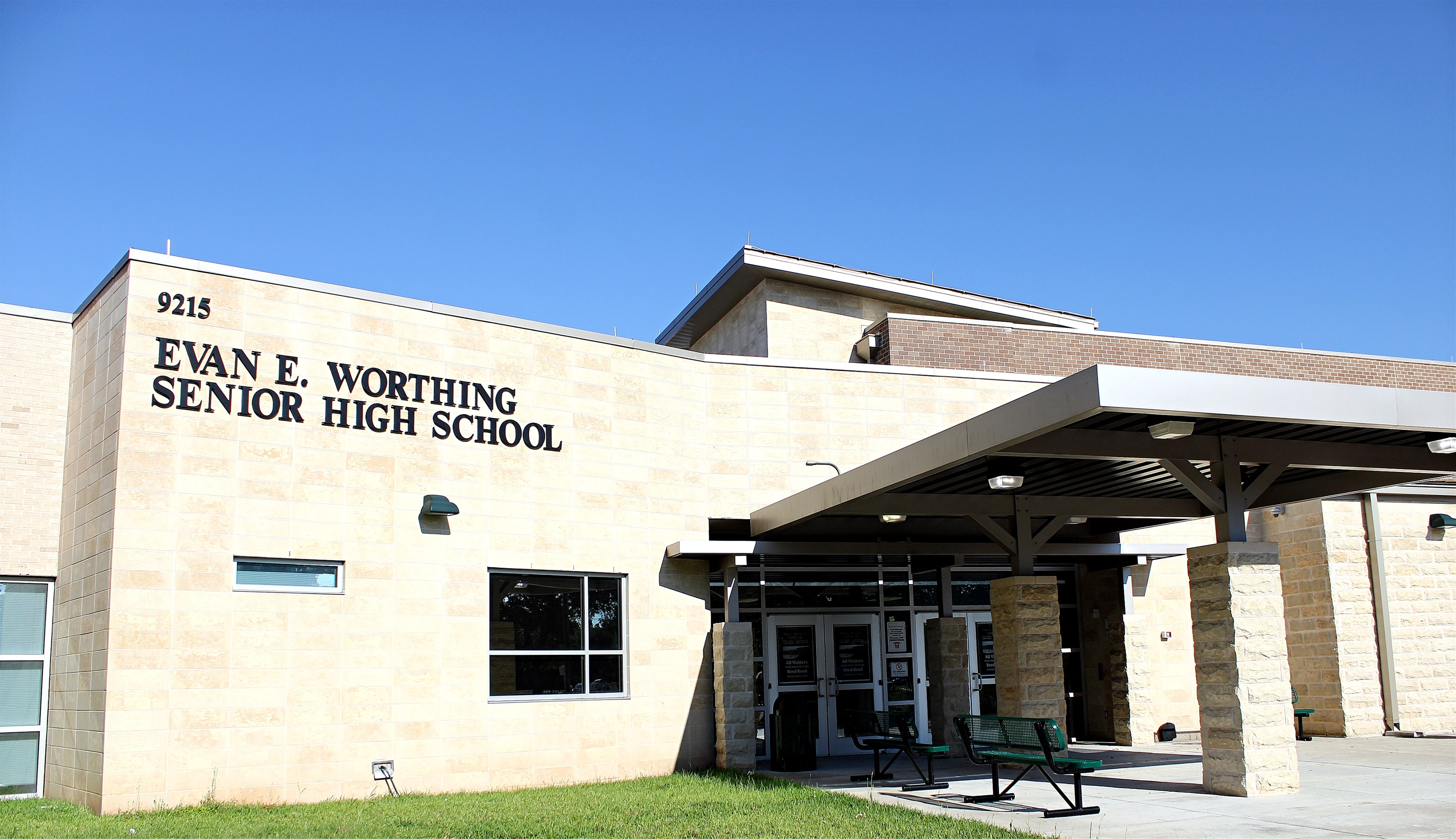
Worthing High School

The community is zoned to Houston Independent School District (HISD) schools. The community is within Trustee District IV, represented by Paula M. Harris as of 2008.

The schools serving Sunnyside proper include Young Elementary School, Attucks Middle School, and Worthing High School. Worthing is located in Sunnyside.

Young Elementary opened as Sunny Side Elementary School in 1918; HISD renamed the school in June 1999 after Sunnyside residents petitioned for a renaming of the school. Young shares its campus with South Administrative Alternative Elementary and Drug-Free School. Worthing was built in 1958, and it opened on January 27, 1958. Prior to the opening of Worthing, students went to Miller Junior High School and Yates High School. After Worthing received a new campus in 1962, Worthing moved out of its former campus, where Attucks opened.

Carnegie Vanguard High School, an HISD magnet school, was previously near Sunnyside. In 2008 Carnegie Vanguard was chosen as a National Blue Ribbon School. Carnegie was scheduled to move to the Fourth Ward.

==== Charter schools ====
The Sunnyside area has the following state charter schools:

KIPP Houston Public Schools operates three charter schools on the same site: KIPP Zenith Academy (grades K-4), established in 2009; KIPP Spirit College Prep (grades 5-8), established in 2006; and KIPP Sunnyside High School (KSHS), which opened in 2010. KIPP Sunnyside HS serves students from the Sunnyside, Third Ward, and Hiram Clarke areas. KIPP Zenith opened as part of a wave of KIPP elementary schools opening at the same time.

YES Prep Public Schools operates YES Prep Southside in Sunnyside. The school is open to children from the Sunnyside, Third Ward, OST, South Park and Old South Union neighborhoods. YES Prep Southside opened in the 2015-2016 school year with a 6th grade class, and will continue to add a grade each year until it has 6th-12th grades.

Pro-Vision Academy, in Sunnyside, relocated to there in November 2008. Pro-Vision was the first all male middle charter school in the State of Texas. Pro-Vision All Male Middle Charter School was established in 1995. Pro-Vision serves grades 5th - 8th. Now since 2014 Pro-Vision welcomes female students and is now an athletic school

Crossroads Charter is located in a four-story office building in the area.

==== Private schools ====
A Kindergarten through 5 Roman Catholic school called St. Philip Neri School, of the Roman Catholic Archdiocese of Galveston-Houston, was in the area. It closed in Spring 2009. The school was consolidated with St. Peter the Apostle Middle School, located in the Third Ward area, which became PK-8 and ultimately closed in 2019.

==== Gallery of public schools ====
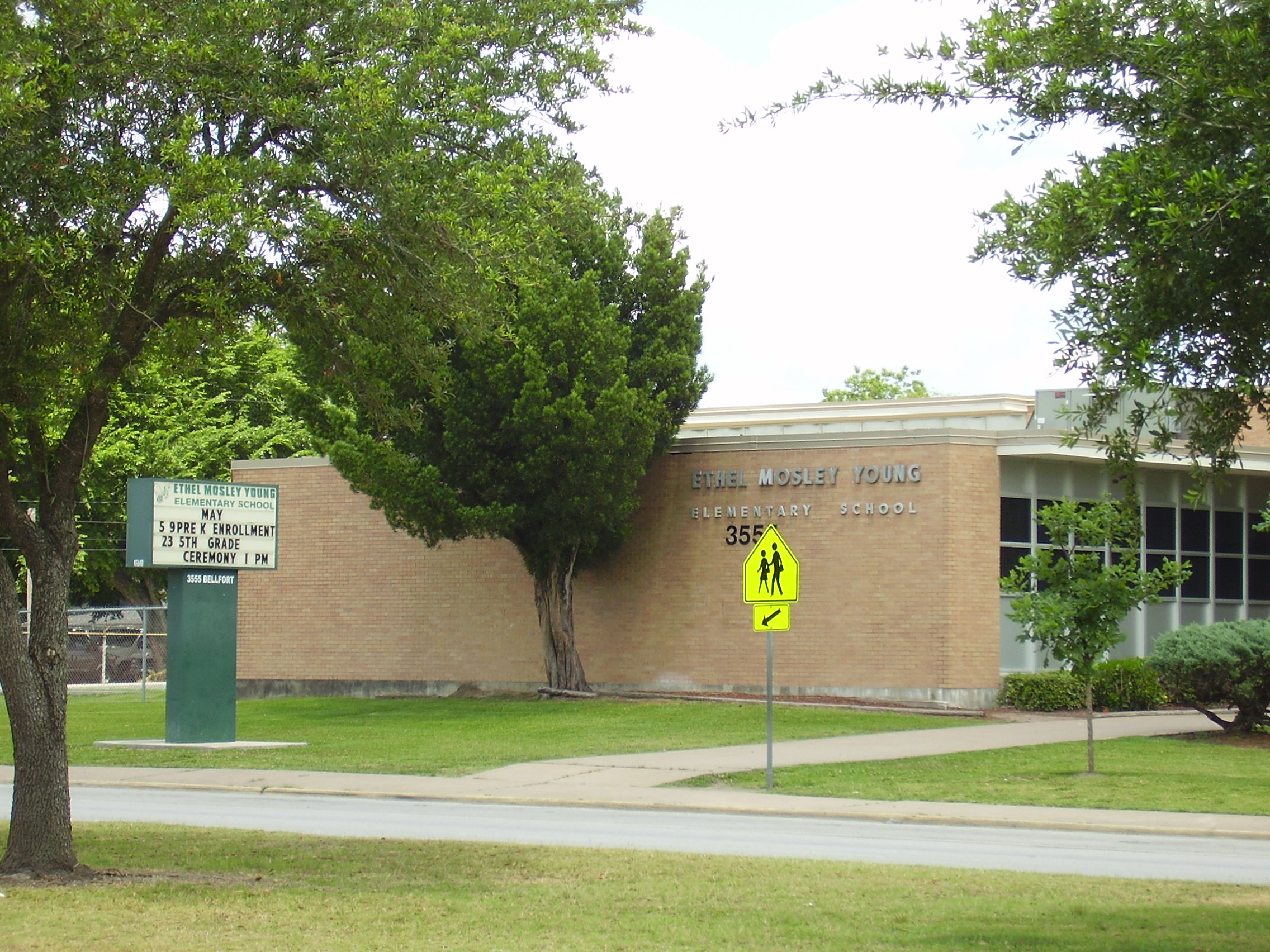
Young Elementary School

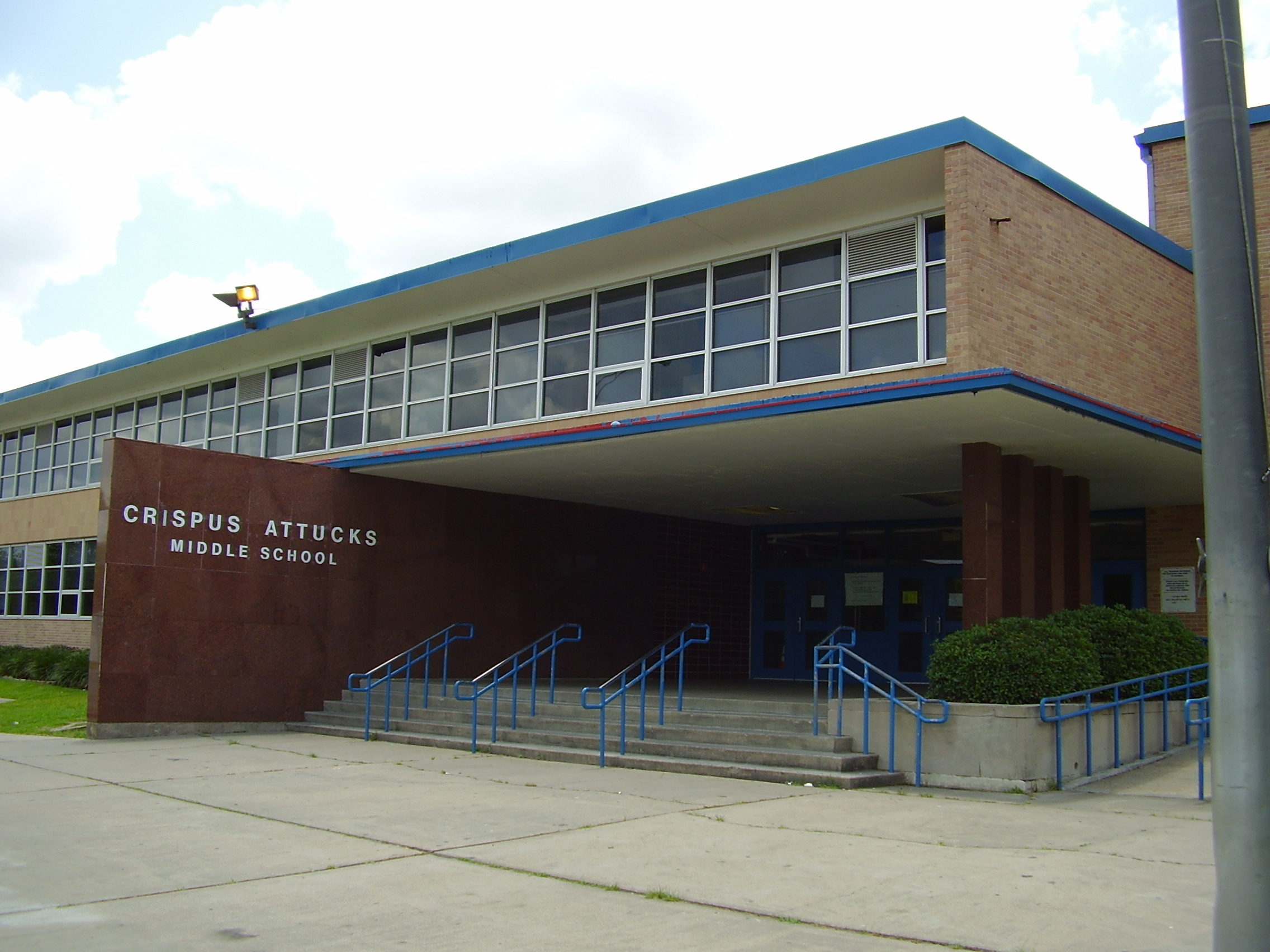
Attucks Middle School

=== Public libraries ===
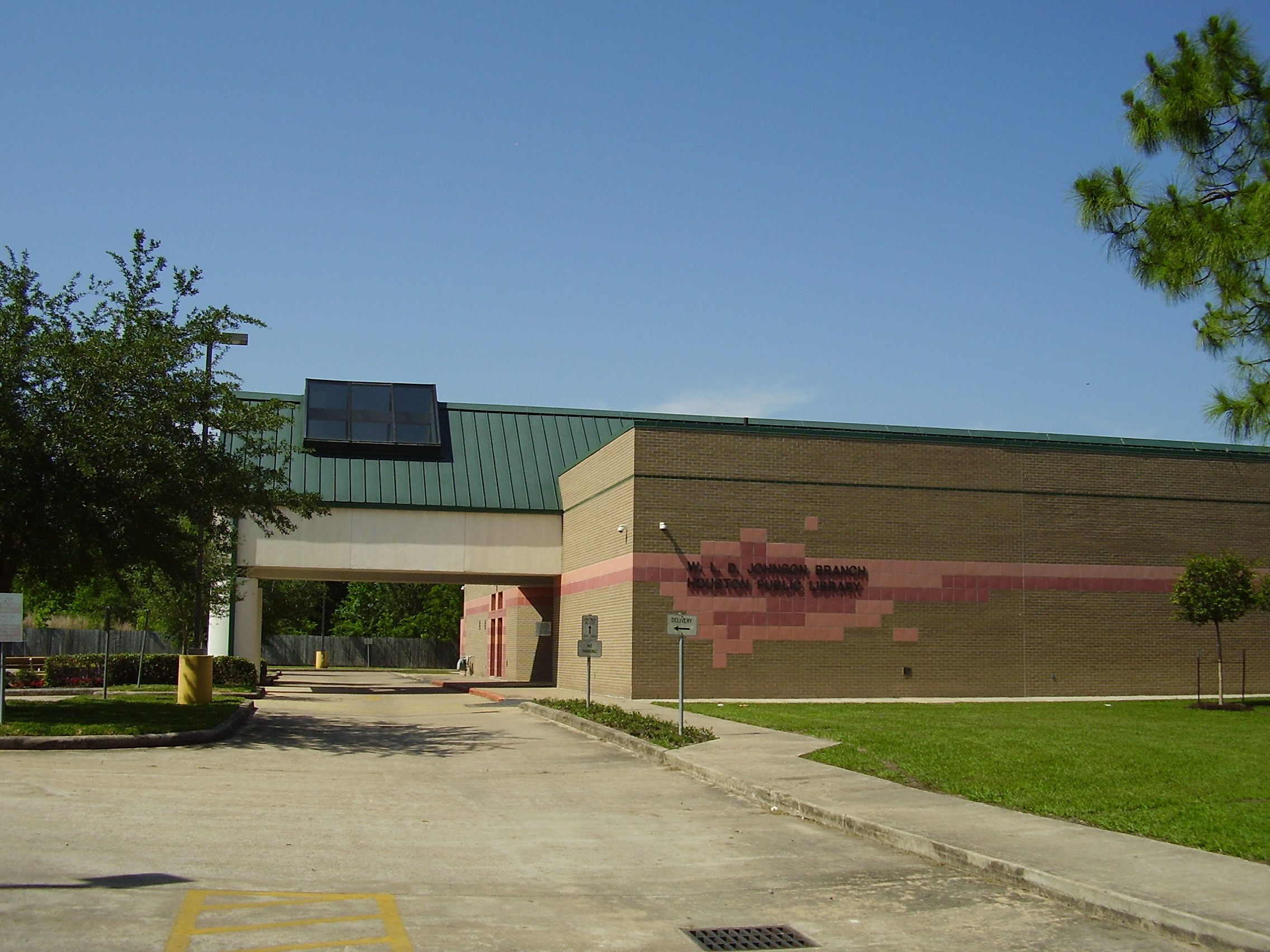
W. L. D. Johnson Branch

The W. L. D. Johnson Neighborhood Library of Houston Public Library is located at 3517 Reed Road. The library was named after W.L.D. Johnson Sr., a man who raised funds for the purchase of the Carnegie Colored Library and served on the board of directors of that library. This branch, dedicated on June 16, 1964, replaced the Carnegie Colored Library.

== Parks and recreation ==
The city operates the Sunnyside Park and the Sunnyside Community Center at 3502 Bellfort Boulevard. The park and the community center include a playground, an outdoor basketball pavilion, a 0.48 miles (0.77 km) hike and bicycle trail, lighted tennis courts, an indoor gymnasium, weight rooms, meeting rooms, a lighted athletics field, and a swimming pool. The community celebrates the "Chocolate Bayou" festival annually. Sunnyside is included in the service area of the Sam Houston Area Council Boy Scouts W.L. Davis District.

== Community services ==
The American Red Cross operates the Southeast (Sunnyside) Houston-Harris County Branch Office at 4605 Wilmington Street.

== Notable residents ==
- Alma Allen - Member of the Texas House of Representatives
- Rodney Ellis - Member of the Texas Senate
- Travis Scott

== Gallery ==
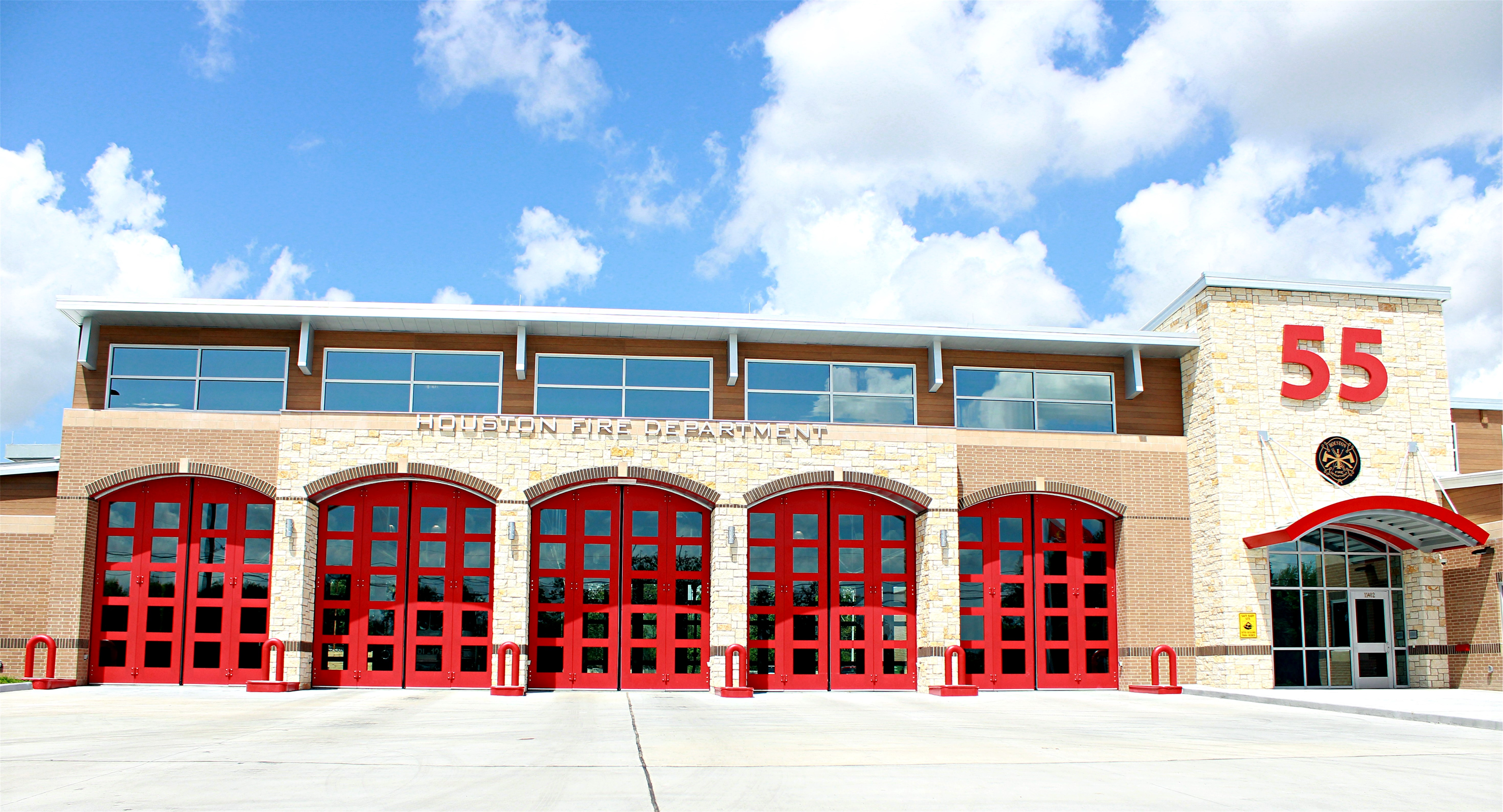
Fire Station 55 Sunnyside

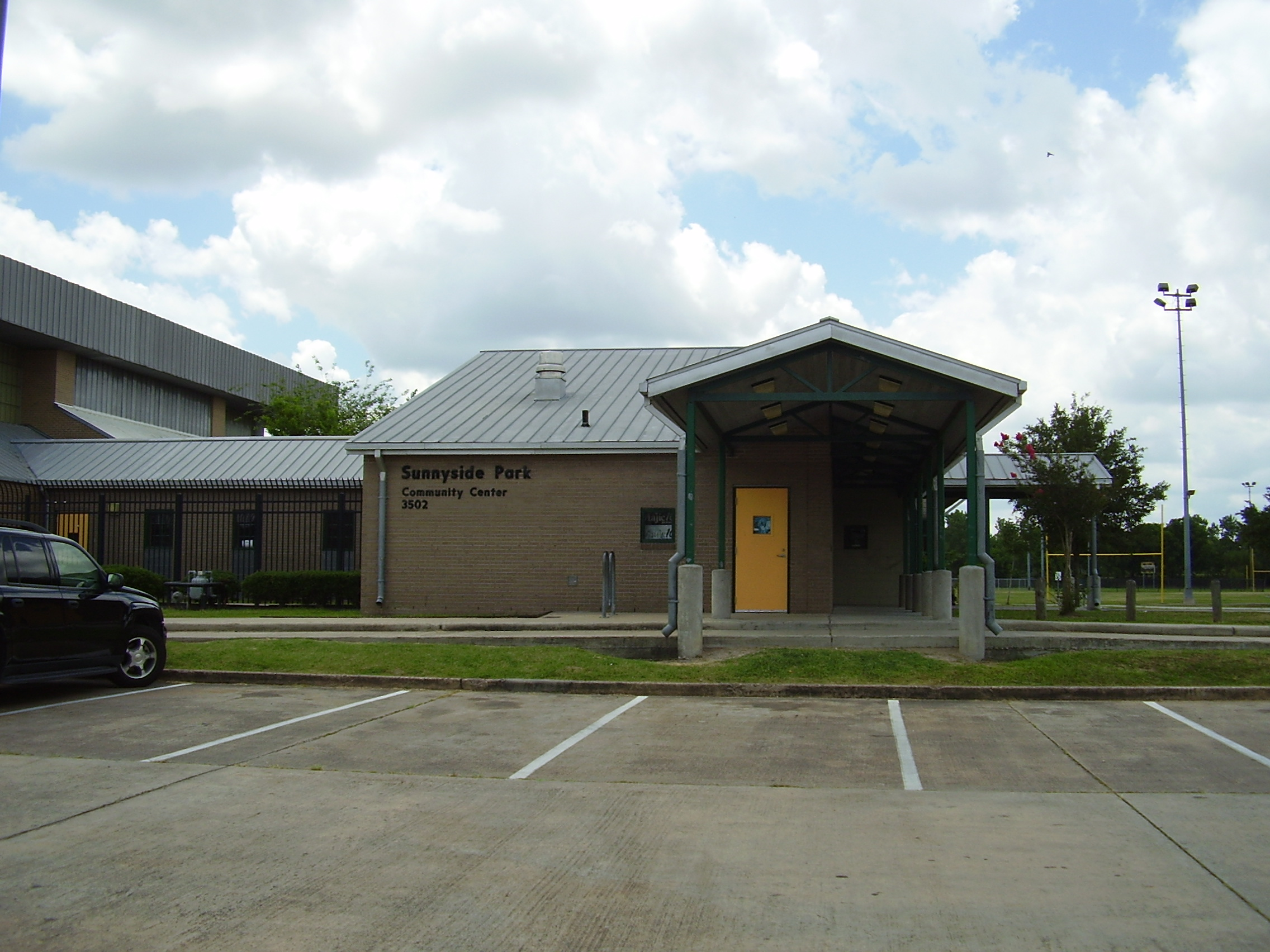
Sunnyside Park

== See also ==
- History of the African-Americans in Houston
