= Uhler (surname) =

Uhler is a surname. Notable people with the surname include:

- Caroline Uhler (born 1983), Swiss statistician
- Maury Uhler (1886–1918), American Major League Baseball player
- Philip Reese Uhler (1835–1913), American librarian and entomologist
- Ruth Pershing Uhler (1895–1967), American painter
