= Julia Ideson Building =

Historic building in Houston, Texas, U.S.

- U.S. National Register of Historic Places
- Recorded Texas Historic Landmark
- Texas State Antiquities Landmark
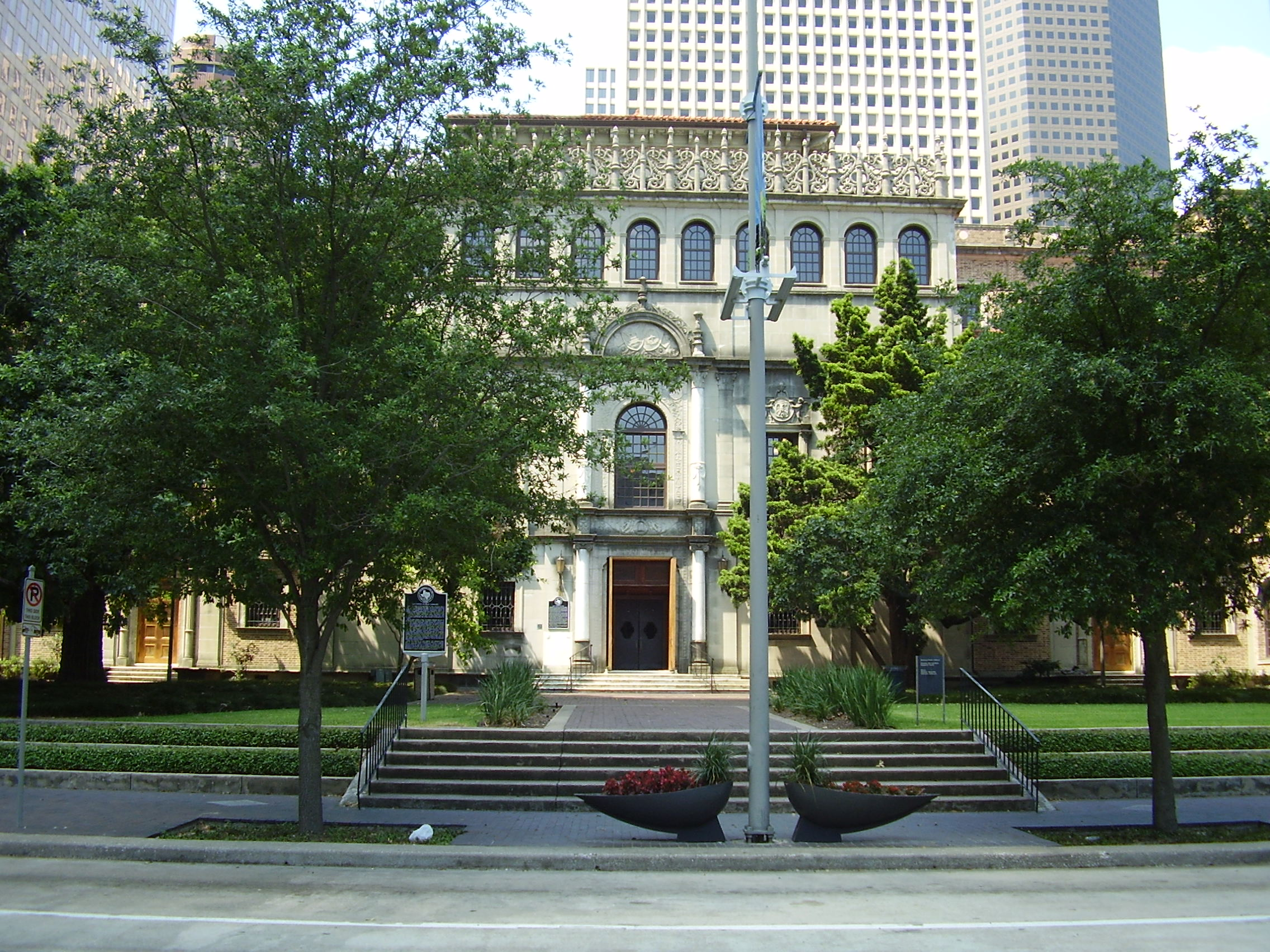
- Julia Ideson Building

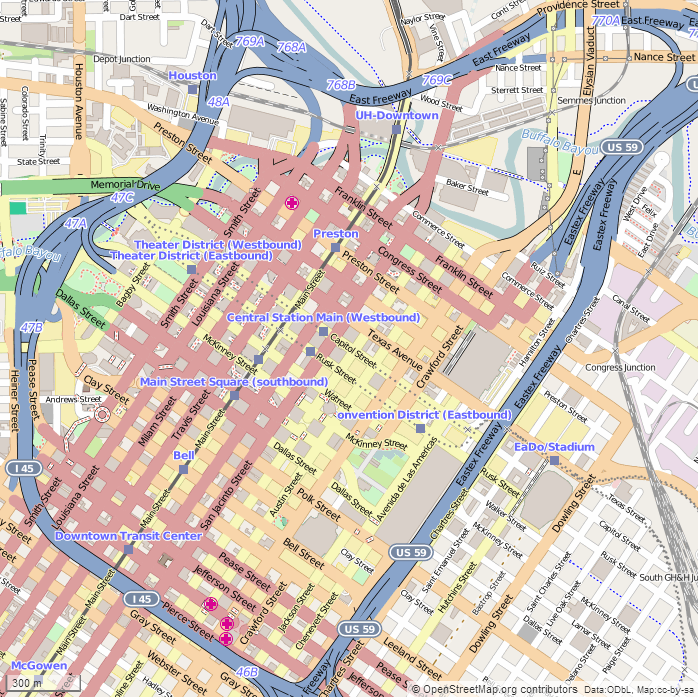
- Location within Houston Downtown Location within Texas Location within the United States
- Location: 550 McKinney Street; Houston, Texas
- Coordinates: 29°45′32″N 95°22′9″W
- Area: 1.5 acres (0.61 ha)
- Built: 1926
- Architect: Ralph Adams Cram
- Architectural style: Late 19th And 20th Century Revivals, Spanish Renaissance
- NRHP reference No.: 77001447
- RTHL No.: 13888
- TSAL No.: 323

Significant dates
- Added to NRHP: November 23, 1977
- Designated RTHL: 2003
- Designated TSAL: 5/28/1981

The Julia Ideson Building is a Houston Public Library facility in Downtown Houston, Texas, United States. It is named for Julia Bedford Ideson, who served as the city's first professional librarian for 40 years.

The Spanish Renaissance-style building is part of the Houston Public Library's Central Library campus and houses the public library's Special Collections department. It is also the site of the Houston History Research Center, formerly known as the Houston Metropolitan Research Center.

The Ideson Building served as Houston's sole permanent library building and as the Central Library of the Houston Public Library system from 1926 to 1976, when the Jesse H. Jones Central Library building was constructed as the main branch next door.

== History ==
The Julia Ideson Building was built with the intention to replace the city's prior Houston Lyceum and the Carnegie Library, which with the city's population growth was not able to house the amount of resources held in the library collections. By 1911, the Carnegie Library was so cramped that shelving units would crowd public library spaces and excess library materials had to be stored at the Harris County Courthouse.

Between 1921 and 1924, Julia Bedford Ideson, Houston's first professional librarian, led efforts to win multiple bond issues that would allow for the construction of a new main library building. The original site proposed by the city for this new library building was a block in between McKinney and Lamar Avenues and Louisiana and Smith Streets, which included the former residence of Thomas W. House Jr., a local Houston banker. However, this original proposal was denied and the city instead chose to purchase a different block in between McKinney and Lamar Avenues and Smith and Brazos Streets, which included the former home of a different local Houston banker Thomas Bagby, the namesake for Bagby Street. Purchase of the Bagby block was approved in September 1922 and the block was purchased for $92,500.

After touring libraries nationwide, Julia Ideson returned with a clear vision for the new structure: it needed natural light, cross-ventilation, and flexible layouts. Collaborating with architects Ralph Adams Cram, Louis A. Glover, and William Ward Watkin, she insisted on more than just utility, famously stating, "It is not enough to be functional; a library must offer delight to the eye."

The Central Library building was formally dedicated and opened on October 17, 1926. The building's architectural style blends common Spanish Renaissance aspects with decorative Texas adornments including regional iconography. Various emblems with famous Texan historical figures can be seen on every side of the building's façade. The building's front façade is reminiscent of that of the main building of the Universidad de Alcalá de Henares in Spain near Madrid. The Central Library was originally planned to be a civic complex, but the city's Public Works Administration was not able to provide the library with the funds to complete the project in full, given the economic state of the country during the Great Depression.

In 1951, the original Central Library building was re-named to the Julia Ideson Building in honor of the city librarian, who had served from 1903 to 1945. Upon completion of the new Central Library (now known as the Jesse H. Jones Central Library) next door in 1976, the Julia Ideson Building underwent a renovation from 1976–1978 to house the Houston Metropolitan Research Center (HMRC). The center was renamed to the Houston History Research Center (HHRC) in 2022 to better reflect its mission.

The building was listed in the National Register of Historic Places in 1977.

In 2007, the Julia Ideson Library Preservation Partners launched a $32 million capital campaign that funded the construction of a new archival wing with adjacent two-story loggia and gardens, as well as the restoration of the entire building to its original historic glory. The project received LEED Gold certification and was completed in 2010 to showcase the beautiful building that you can visit today.

A $32 million capital campaign launched in 2007 by the Julia Ideson Library Preservation Partners underwrote the construction of a new archival wing with adjacent two-story loggia and gardens well as the restoration of the 1926 building to its original glory. The project received LEED Gold certification.

The Julia Ideson Building is a City of Houston Protected Landmark, a Recorded Texas Historical Landmark, a Texas State Archaeological Landmark, and a landmark listed in the National Register of Historic Places.

Lana Berkowitz of the Houston Chronicle described a local legend that the Ideson Building was haunted by the ghosts of library caretaker Jacob Frank Cramer and his dog Petey.

== Art Pieces and Murals ==
The Julia Ideson Building is home to Houston's most extensive collection of Depression-era murals. The murals in the building include:

- A triptych of Spanish iconographic scenes painted by Angela McDonnell of Galveston, Texas.
- A Talavera tile depicting Don Quixote, donated to the library in 1929 by Esperanza Velasquez Bringas, the librarian of Mexico City at the time.
- A mural by Ruth Pershing Uhler depicting a Houston Lyceum Committee subscription drive in 1854, responsible for the creation of the original Houston Lyceum building.
- A collection of four murals by Emma Richardson Cherry, "The Texas President's Home", "The Texas Republic Capitol's Building", "Beauvoir", and "Arlington"

In addition to murals, the Ideson building also has a number of sculptures about the building. The second floor Tudor gallery is home to three busts, a 1914 painted marble sculpture of Petrarch’s Laura, a 1906 bronze sculpture of the Greek lyric poet Sappho, and a stone sculpture of Juan Seguin. An 1825 bronze bust of Marquis de Lafayette was formally loaned to the Ideson Building on July 10, 2026 and is currently located in the building's second floor Reading Room.

Also in the second floor Reading Room is a plaster cast of the original Venus di Milo sculpture. The sculpture was originally acquired by the Houston Public School Art League (a precursor to the Museum of Fine Arts, Houston) in 1902. The Louvre-certified plaster cast of the ancient original was intended to serve as a classical learning aid for students at Houston High School.

However, the statue’s arrival sparked a local controversy. The Houston School Board rejected the gift, citing "conscientious moral scruples on the part of some" regarding the nudity of her upper torso. Exiled from the school system, the statue was purchased by a local group of art lovers who donated the statue to the Carnegie Library. She was officially unveiled on the same day the library opened to the public in 1904. In 1926, the statue was moved from the Carnegie building to the new Central Library, where she has remained.

== Houston History Research Center ==
In 1974, the National Endowment for the Humanities awarded funds to a two-year co-operative project of the Southwest Center for Urban Research, Rice University, the University of Houston, Texas Southern University, and the Houston Public Library. The project -- the Houston Metropolitan Archives and Research Center (HMARC).

The brainchild of Harold M. Hyman (1924–2023), a Professor of History at Rice University who was discouraged by the lack of sources for graduate-level research on Houston’s history. Hyman initially began organizing the project's groundwork in the basement of Rice’s Fondren Library. The grant allowed work to begin in earnest; full time staffing led to the acquisition of archival collections and oral histories that remain in the holdings of the institution.

The grant-funded phase concluded in May 1976, and the collected materials were transferred to the Houston Public Library’s newly constructed Jesse H. Jones Building. In November 1979, following a major restoration of the historic Julia Ideson Building, the newly renamed Houston Metropolitan Research Center (HMRC) transformed the building’s former open stacks into a premier archive for the city's documentary heritage.

The HMRC shared its new home with a pre-existing local history collection (housed in The Texas Room) and a fresh Special Collections department— responsible for, among other things, the notable Meldrum, Milsaps, and Finnigan collections.

Today, the Houston History Research Center is one of three History Research Centers that make up the Special Collections department of the Houston Public Library system. Other centers in the department include the Family History Research Center at the Clayton Library Campus (formed in 1968) and the African American History Research Center at the Gregory Campus (formed in 2009). According to the Houston Public Library's website, the mission of the Houston History Research Center is to "locate, preserve, and make available to researchers the documentary evidence of Houston’s history".
