= Emma Richardson Cherry =

American painter

- Born: February 28, 1859; Aurora, Illinois, U.S.
- Died: October 29, 1954 (aged 95); Houston, Texas, U.S.
- Education: Académie Julian; Art Students League of New York; Art Institute of Chicago

Emma Richardson Cherry (February 28, 1859 – October 29, 1954) was an American artist known for her paintings of landscapes, still lifes and portraits.

== Early life ==
Emma Richardson was born in Aurora, Illinois on February 28, 1859 to James Perkins and Frances Ann (Mostow) Richardson.

== Career ==
Richardson was a co-founder of the Kansas City Art Association and School of Design, after moving to the city and establishing an art studio in 1885. She was living in Nebraska when she met Dillon Brook Cherry, whom she married. In 1888, she began a two-year tour of Europe in order to study art. She was a student of Académie Julian (c. 1887) in Paris and of the Art Students League of New York periodically from 1879 to 1885. She studied with William Merritt Chase at his Shinnecock School of Art in 1896. She was a member of the Denver Art Club as well as the Western Art Association, from which she received a gold medal in 1891.

By the 1890s, Cherry and her husband relocated to Houston, where she found the former downtown home of ex-Houston-mogul, William Marsh Rice. She acquired the house and moved it to Fargo Street in the Montrose area. She was an organizer of the Houston Art League, which was founded in 1900, and later formed the basis for Houston's first art museum.

In 1903, Cherry was painting in Chicago and its vicinity. Among her sitters were Orrington Lunt, the donor of the Library of the Northwestern University, and Bishop Foster, a former president of the same university. She also completed a portrait of a former president of the American Society of Civil Engineers, Mr. O. Chanute. An exhibition of ten portraits by Richardson was held in Chicago in 1903 and was favorably noticed.

Richardson was one of the co-founders of the Houston Public School Art League (later the Houston Art League, c. 1900), a group dedicated to supporting arts education in public schools. The opening of the Museum of Fine Arts, Houston in 1924 was in thanks to the League who planned the museum and dedicated land to the project in 1917.

== Death and legacy ==
Cherry died on October 29, 1954. She was commissioned to paint large wall murals at the Julia Ideson Library in Houston, and these works are still extant in 2020. Her house on Fargo Street was later moved to Sam Houston Park in downtown Houston, the first historic structure to relocate to that park. As of 2020, it is available for tours, where some of Cherry's art work is on display.
