= W.L.D. Johnson Neighborhood Library =

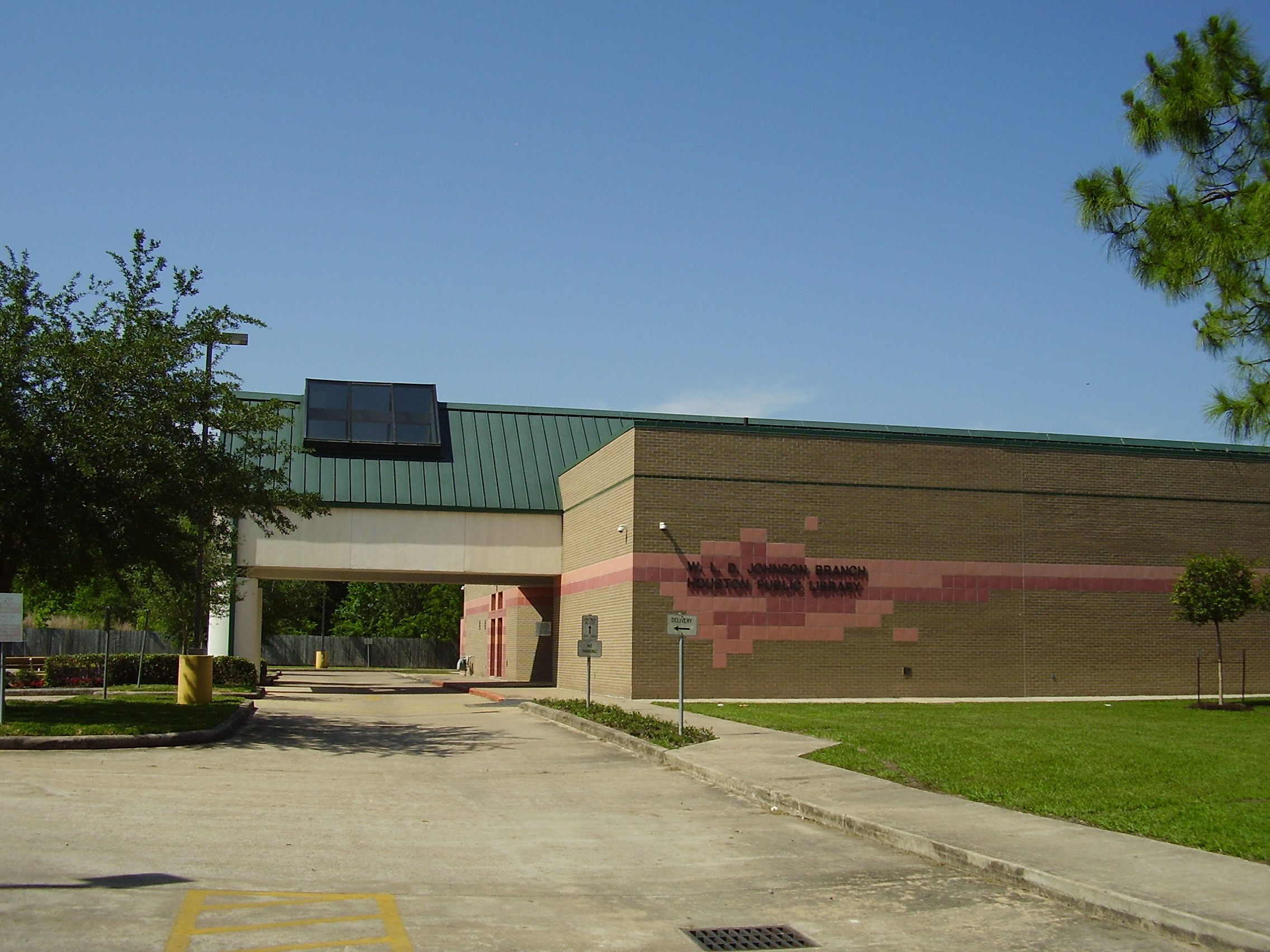
- W. L. D. Johnson Branch
- 29.658947130294777°N 95.37069029833334°W
- Location: Houston, Texas, United States
- Type: Public library
- Established: 1964
- Branch of: Houston Public Library

Other information
- Website: houstonlibrary.org/johnson

The W. L. D. Johnson Neighborhood Library is a Houston Public Library branch in Houston, Texas. It replaced the Carnegie Colored Library, a Carnegie Library established by Houston's African American community in the Fourth Ward that was demolished for Interstate Highway 45 construction in 1962. The current branch is located at 3517 Reed Road. The library is named after W.L.D. Johnson, Sr., a man who raised funds for the purchase of the Carnegie Colored Library and served on the board of directors of that library. The new library building was dedicated on June 16, 1964 and replaced the original Carnegie Colored Library.

== Carnegie Colored Library ==
African Americans were prohibited from accessing the Houston Lyceum and Carnegie Library, so African American leaders organized their own public library in Houston's Booker T. Washington High School in 1909. Native Houstonian Emmett J. Scott and his boss Booker T. Washington secured a Carnegie Library grant to help pay for a new building. Local real estate investor and civic leader John Brown Bell heard about the project from Scott and delegated the news of the library to mayor Horace Baldwin Rice, in order to secure annual city funds to upkeep the building. Bell was made the chairman of the committee to secure funds to buy the real estate lot. After the library was built in April 1913, Bell was made the treasurer of the Library Association. The board overseeing the institution was composed entirely of African Americans.

The library was designed in 1913 by William Sidney Pittman, a prominent African American architect, and the son-in-law of Booker T. Washington. It faced Frederick Street.

In 1921 the city of Houston disbanded the library board and made the library a branch of the Houston Public Library system. Charles Norton Love, an African American civil rights activist and publisher of the Texas Freeman helped advocate for construction and funding of the library.

Houston's public library system was desegregated in 1953. The neoclassical library building was demolished in 1962 to make way for Interstate 45 that cut through Houston's Fourth Ward.

Page 23 of Houston Lost and Unbuilt includes photos of the Carnegie Colored Library during its dedication in 1912, architectural plans, and a photo of city leaders and African American officials during demolition.

== Legacy ==
The Carnegie Colored Library was a turning point for library services in the segregated South. Through the work of librarian Julia Ideson and an all-black committee made up of Houston leaders, African Americans were active participants in planning and governing their own library. The Carnegie Colored Library, though it provided services that were nonexistent before, still existed and operated in a segregationist structure that provided unequal services and collections. However, the Carnegie Colored Library model "moved beyond the lobbying of local white librarians and city officials" to a national strategy in which black leaders could proclaim themselves "actors in the civic and cultural politics that influenced their city, the services it provided, and its built environment."

== See also ==
- History of African Americans in Houston
