= Ruth Pershing Uhler =

American painter (1895–1967)

- Uhler in 1966
- Born: March 21, 1895; Gordon, Pennsylvania, U.S.
- Died: March 28, 1967 (age 72); Houston, Texas, U.S.
- Education: Painter, teacher, curator

Ruth Pershing Uhler (March 21, 1895 – March 28, 1967) was an American painter, teacher and curator. She was the first curator of education at the Museum of Fine Arts, Houston.

== Early life and education ==
Uhler was born in Gordon, Pennsylvania, the daughter of William Shipman Uhler and Emma Lucetta Nattress Uhler. She moved to Houston, Texas, with her family when she was in her teens. She attended the Moore Institute of Design in Philadelphia.

== Career ==
Uhler was a painter and a muralist as a young woman. She painted murals for the Houston Public Library, the Houston City Hall, and the YMCA building in the 1930s. But she is best known for her striking landscape paintings of the American Southwest, possibly inspired by the works of Georgia O'Keeffe. Uhler burned many of her own works in 1940, saying "I only want my best work to survive."

Uhler worked at the Museum of Fine Arts, Houston, from 1937 to 1967, and in 1941 became the museum's first curator of education. She taught art classes at the museum, and was jokingly described as "curator of everything" for her attention to every detail of the museum's operations. "The great galleries of the Museum of Fine Arts were given hospitable warmth by her quiet, unobtrusive presence," noted a 1967 editorial in the Houston Post. She gave an oral history interview to the Smithsonian's Archives of American Art in 1965.

== Personal life and legacy ==
While she was recovering from tuberculosis in 1935 and 1936, Uhler lived with fellow artist Grace Spaulding John in Santa Fe. John painted a portrait of Uhler in 1932. Uhler died in 1967, from ovarian cancer, in Houston, at the age of 72. Only ten of her paintings are known to survive. In 1968, the Houston Post established the Ruth Pershing Uhler Memorial Scholarship Award in her memory. In 2017, six of her Earth Rhythms series of Southwestern landscapes were exhibited together at the Houston Public Library's Ideson Gallery. One of her Earth Rhythms paintings is at the Dallas Museum of Art. Another, "Growth" (1934), is in the Panhandle-Plains Historical Museum in Canyon, Texas. There is a scrapbook about Uhler, including letters from her, in the Grace Spaulding John papers, on microfilm in the Archives of American Art.
