= Julia Ideson =

American librarian (1880–1945)

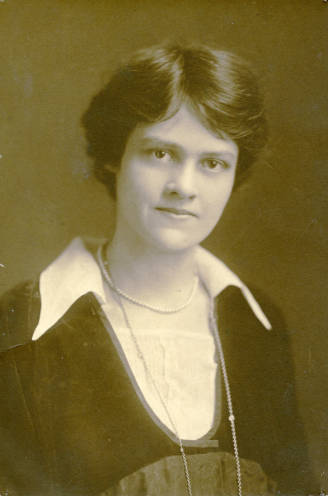
- Born: July 15, 1880; Hastings
- Died: 1945 (aged 64–65)
- Occupation: Librarian
- Employer: Houston Public Library

Julia Bedford Ideson (1880–1945) was an American librarian. She was the first head librarian of the Houston Public Library in Houston, Texas.

== Biography ==
Ideson was born on July 15, 1880, in Hastings, Nebraska, to parents John and Rose Ideson. John Ideson owned a bookstore in Hastings until the family relocated to Houston when Julia was 12. She later graduated from Houston High School in 1899, going on to enroll at the University of Texas. Though she had intended to become a teacher, she changed to the new course offering in library science during her second year.

== Librarian career ==
Ideson served in her role for forty years, serving as a leader in the library science profession and many community activities in Houston. She was a proponent of professional opportunities for women and was the leader of a primarily-female library staff. The Julia Ideson Building, currently owned by the Houston Public Library, was named in her honor.

== Social and political activism ==
Ideson was involved in many political and social issues. In February 1919, she traveled to France to manage a library established there for American soldiers.

Ideson was one of the creators of the Houston Open Forum, which brought invited speakers together with Houston residents to discuss controversial topics. The Forum ran for over 10 years, from 1926 through 1938.

In 1938, Ideson served on a committee to evaluate Houston's charter.
