= Houston Public Library =

Public library system of Houston, Texas

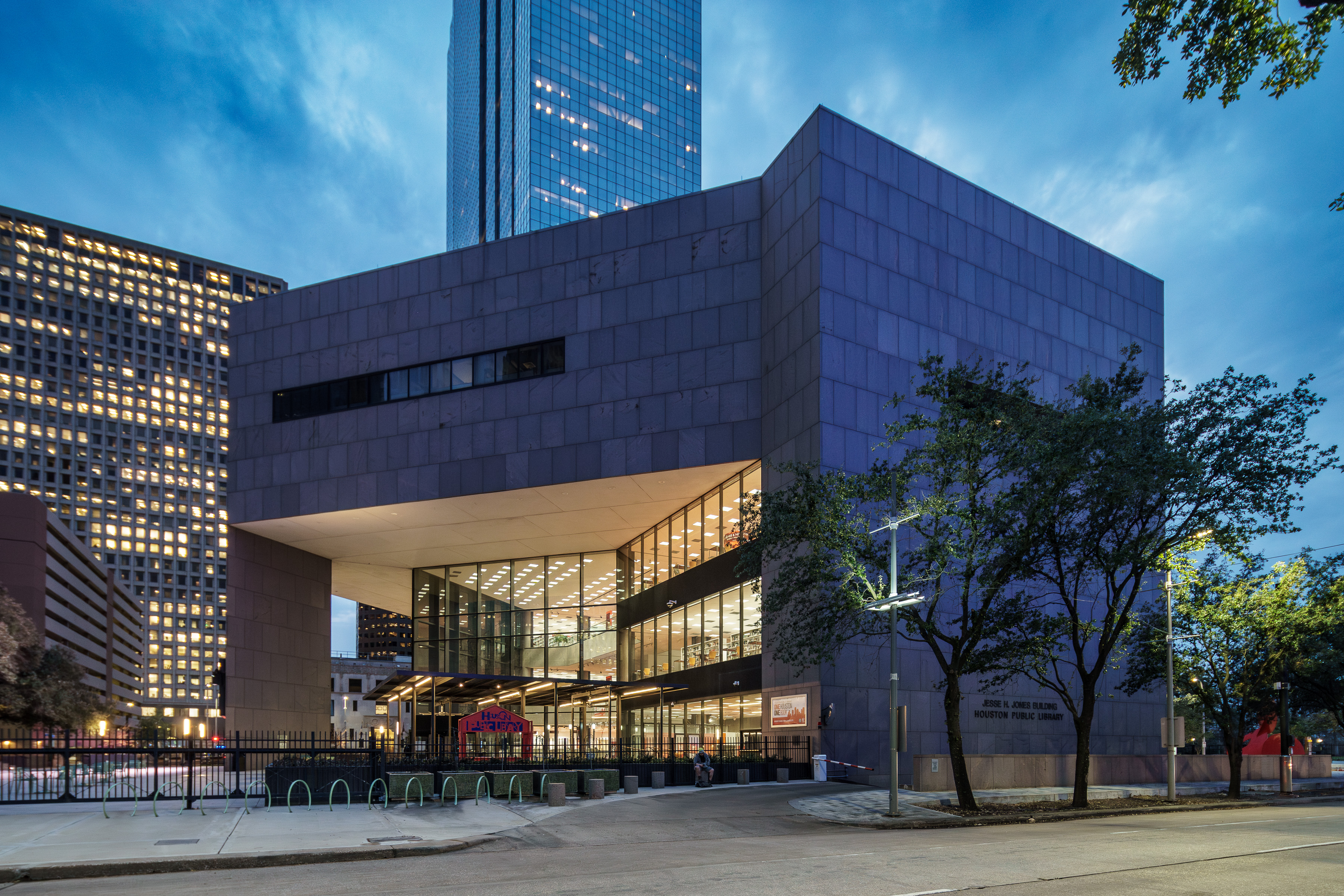
- Jesse H. Jones Building in Downtown Houston
- 29.75945°N 95.36993°W
- Location: United States
- Established: 1904
- Branches: 44

Collection
- Size: 3.6 million

Other information
- Website: houstonlibrary.org

Houston Public Library is the public library system serving Houston, Texas, United States.

== History ==
=== Houston Lyceum and the Carnegie Library ===
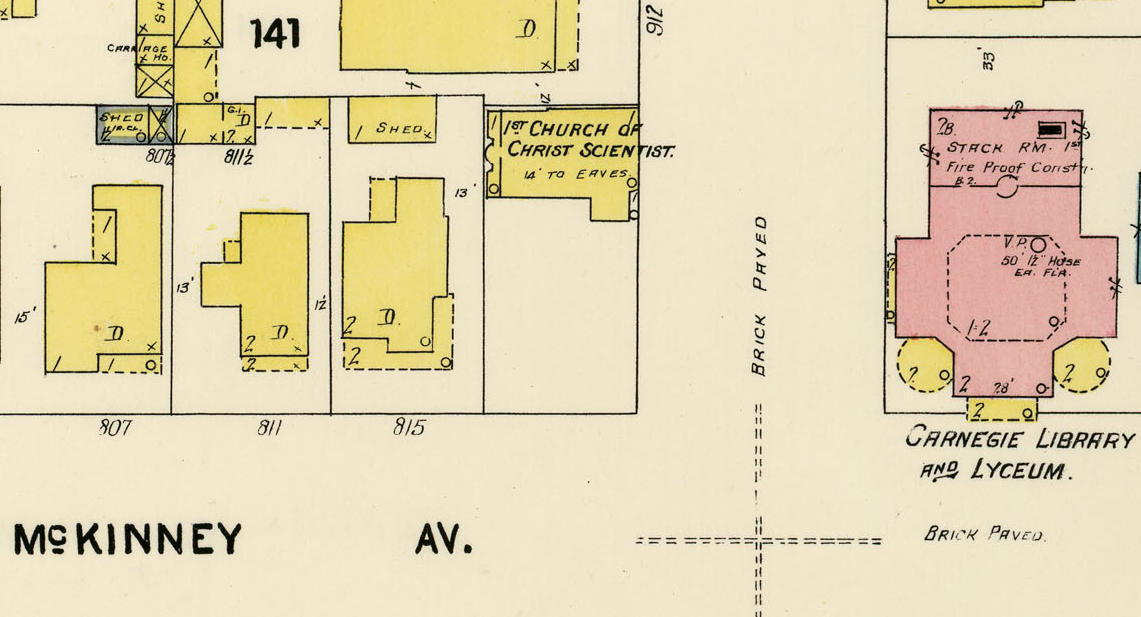
1907 Sanborn map showing the location of the Carnegie Library and Houston Lyceum.

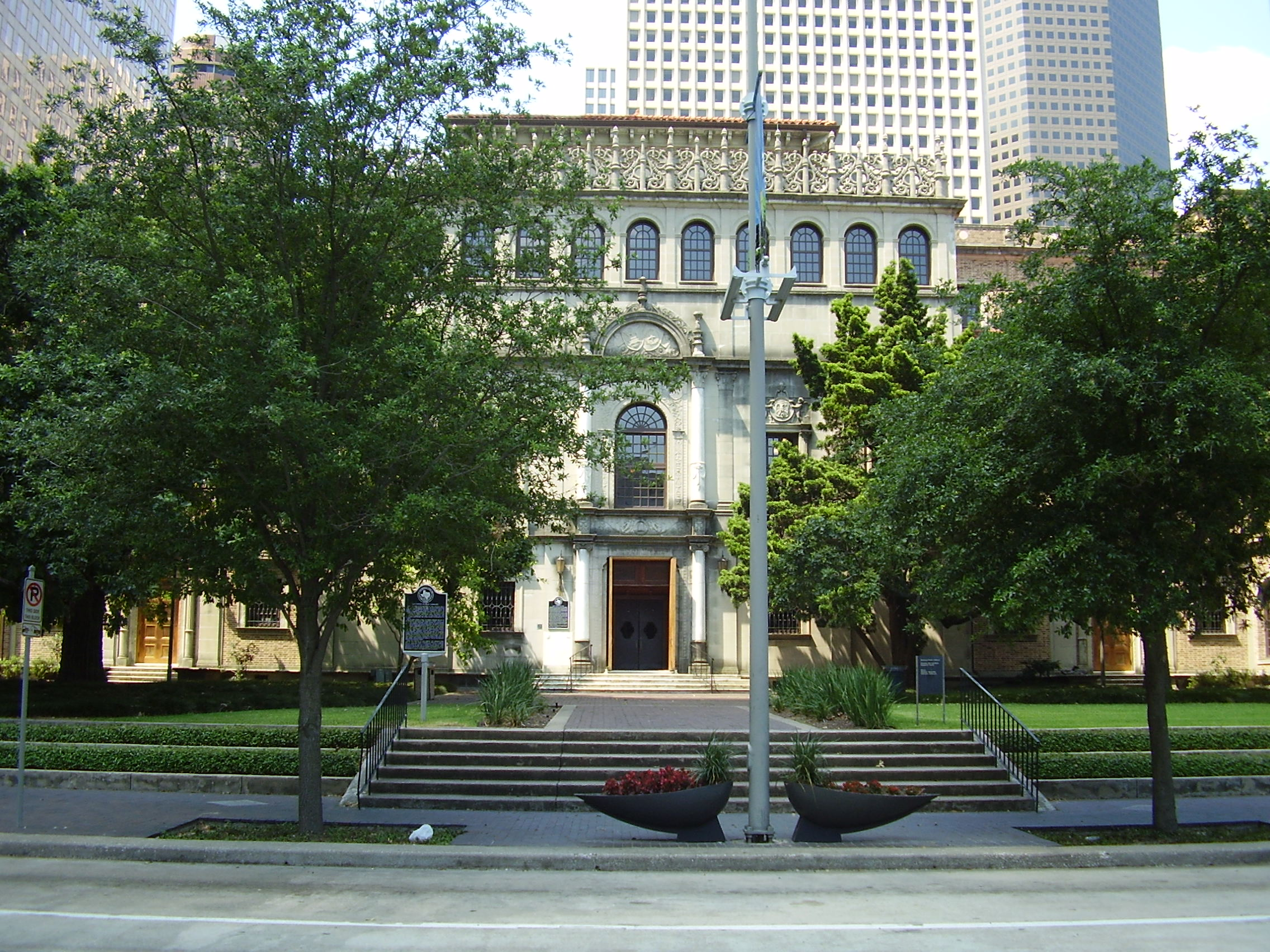
Julia Ideson Building in Downtown

The Houston Public Library system traces its founding to the creation of the second Houston Lyceum in 1854. The lyceum was preceded by a debating society, a special-interest mechanics' lyceum, and a circulating library. The lyceum's library eventually split into a separate institution at the end of the 19th century.

In 1892, William Marsh Rice, a Houston businessman and philanthropist who later chartered Rice University, donated $200,000 for the construction of a free public library. The facility opened in 1895 and obtained its own building in 1904 with financial assistance from Andrew Carnegie. Betty Trapp Chapman wrote in The Houston Review that the city's women "were instrumental" in the library's establishment and that the educated women "had long recognized the need for a library to serve the community." Julia Ideson was named its first librarian and she hired one employee. Located at the corner of Travis and McKinney in what is now known as Downtown Houston, it originally housed 10,000 volumes. By 1907, 10,000 Houstonians held accounts at the library. By 1913, the library counted seven persons on its payroll. The city changed the name from Carnegie Library to Houston Public Library in 1921. By this time, they had outgrown their space and relocated several staff members to the Harris County Courthouse. A few years later, the library sold its property to raise money for a larger facility.

=== Julia Ideson Library ===
The library board selected a lot once occupied by Thomas M. Bagby, a co-founder of the 1848 Houston Lyceum. They commissioned Cram and Ferguson as design architects, in consultation with William Ward Watkin and Louis A. Glover. The building was completed in two years and at a cost of $500,000. The Spanish Renaissance design draws from regional history, and includes carvings of explorers and missionaries of Texas. The second floor hall lay under a rotunda, fronted by an interior oaken gate with carved columns and entablatures. The new building opened with a collection of more than thirty thousand volumes. The building constructed as Houston's Central Library in 1926 was later named the Julia Ideson Building in her honor.

=== Carnegie Colored Library ===
The board for the Houston Carnegie Library had planned for universal access to the facilities. The Colored Carnegie Library of Houston opened in April 1913, with an African American board of trustees and management. It was transferred to the management as a branch library of Houston Public Library in 1921.

On July 31, 1961, the Carnegie Colored Library closed. The library facility required extensive repairs and it was in the path of the Clay Avenue extension project. The branch, auctioned in February 1962 and shortly afterward demolished except for the cornerstone, was replaced by the W. L. D. Johnson Library in Sunnyside, dedicated on June 16, 1964.

=== Expansion and branch libraries ===
The library system racially desegregated in 1953. Beforehand, blacks were permitted use of the Colored Carnegie Branch and deposit stations located at a park, a high school, and an elementary school; whites were permitted use of the main library, six branches, two bookmobiles, and several deposit stations. Desegregation occurred after a letter printed in the Houston Informer from several prominent black Houstonians, including Smith v. Allwright plaintiff Lonnie E. Smith, stated they would prefer a voluntary desegregation program despite their likelihood of winning a lawsuit; shortly before the letter was printed, Sweatt v. Painter was decided by the U.S. Supreme Court, which challenged the "separate but equal" legal doctrine. In June 1953, Mayor of Houston Roy Hofheinz told the HPL board that library facilities should no longer be segregated. On August 21, 1953, library facilities for high school students and adults were desegregated – without public announcement to the black community.

The library system now consists of 35 neighborhood libraries, including four regional libraries, the Clayton Library Center for Genealogical Research in the Museum District, and the Central Library in Downtown. Central Library consists of the Julia Ideson Building and the Jesse H. Jones Building, constructed in 1976. Out-of-state users are entitled to access to the Library's resources, after paying a $40 annual fee.

The HPL administrative offices were moved out of the Jones Building, freeing 12,600 square feet (1,170 m^{2}) of space. Lisa Gray, of the Houston Chronicle, said the renovation made the Jones Building "less of a public space devoted to reading, and more of a public space, period." The offices moved to the Marston Building. In 2012, the Marston Building was sold by the City of Houston, and the HPL administrative office moved to the recently restored Julia Ideson Building while other staff offices moved back to the Jones Building.

Additions in the 2000s include McGovern-Stella Link Neighborhood Library (2005), HPL Express Southwest (2008), and HPL Express Discovery Green (2008). A new building for Looscan Neighborhood Library opened in 2007, replacing a 1956 structure.

The Jones Building closed for renovations in 2006 and reopened in 2008. That same year, the Houston Press heralded the project as Houston's best renovation in its annual awards.

In 2010, due to a budget shortfall, the library system reduced its hours. During the same year the system put its decades-old city directories online.

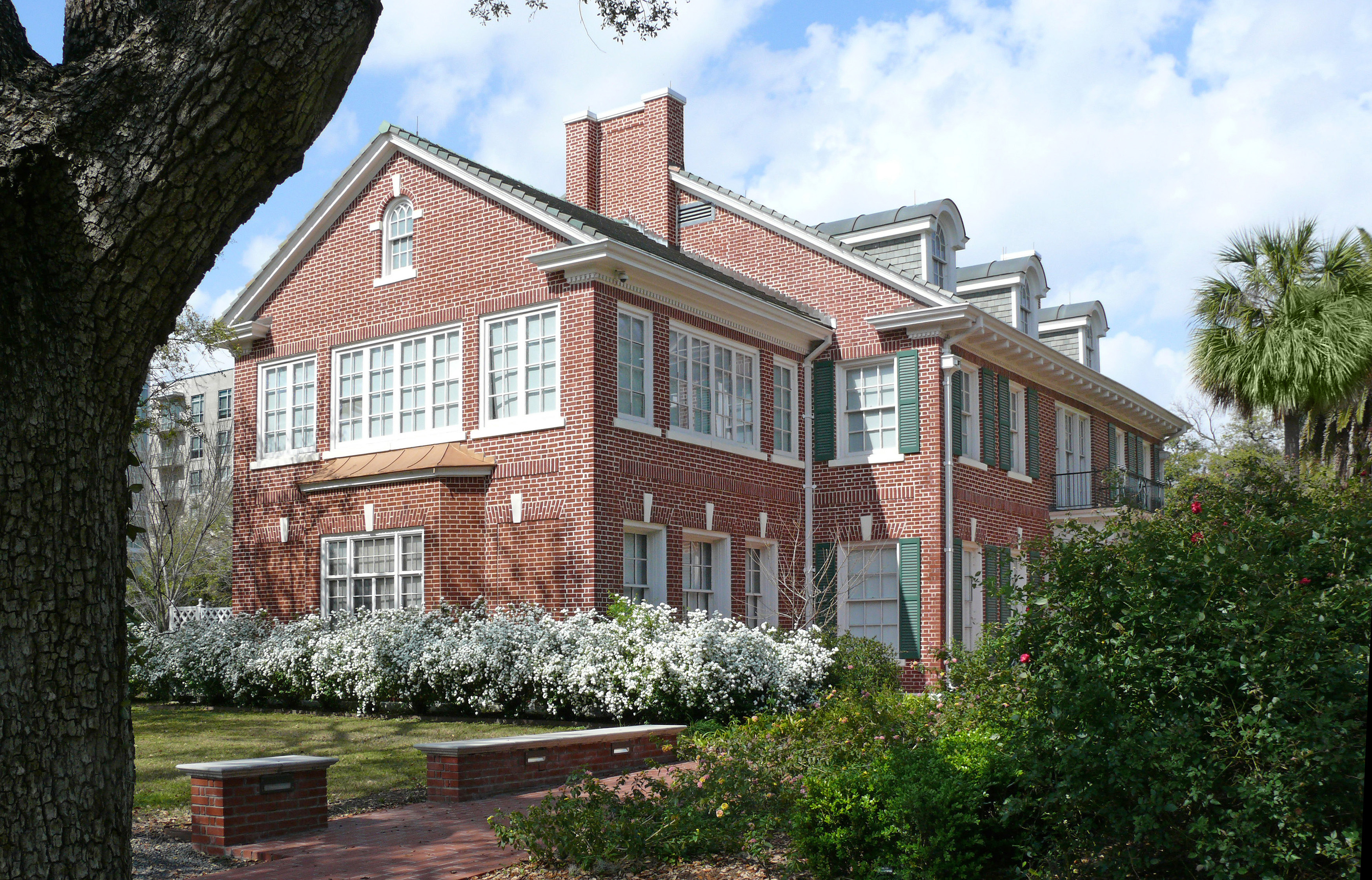
Clayton House of the Clayton Library, Center for Genealogical Research in the Houston Museum District

== Locations ==
=== Headquarters ===
During the Jesse H. Jones Building remodeling the HPL administrative offices moved to the 22,000-square-foot (2,000 m^{2}) Marston Building in Neartown Houston. The City of Houston spent $1.3 million to renovate the Marston Building to accommodate HPL staff. Prior to the remodeling, the HPL administrative offices were located in the Jones Building. In 2012 HPL administrative offices moved to the Julia Ideson Building after its historically correct renovation and the addition of a wing which was in the original design, but was not built at the time due to lack of funds. This addition houses the Houston Metropolitan Research Center (HMRC) which is the archival center of the Houston Public Library System. The Marston Building was sold in 2012 by the City of Houston.

=== Neighborhood libraries ===
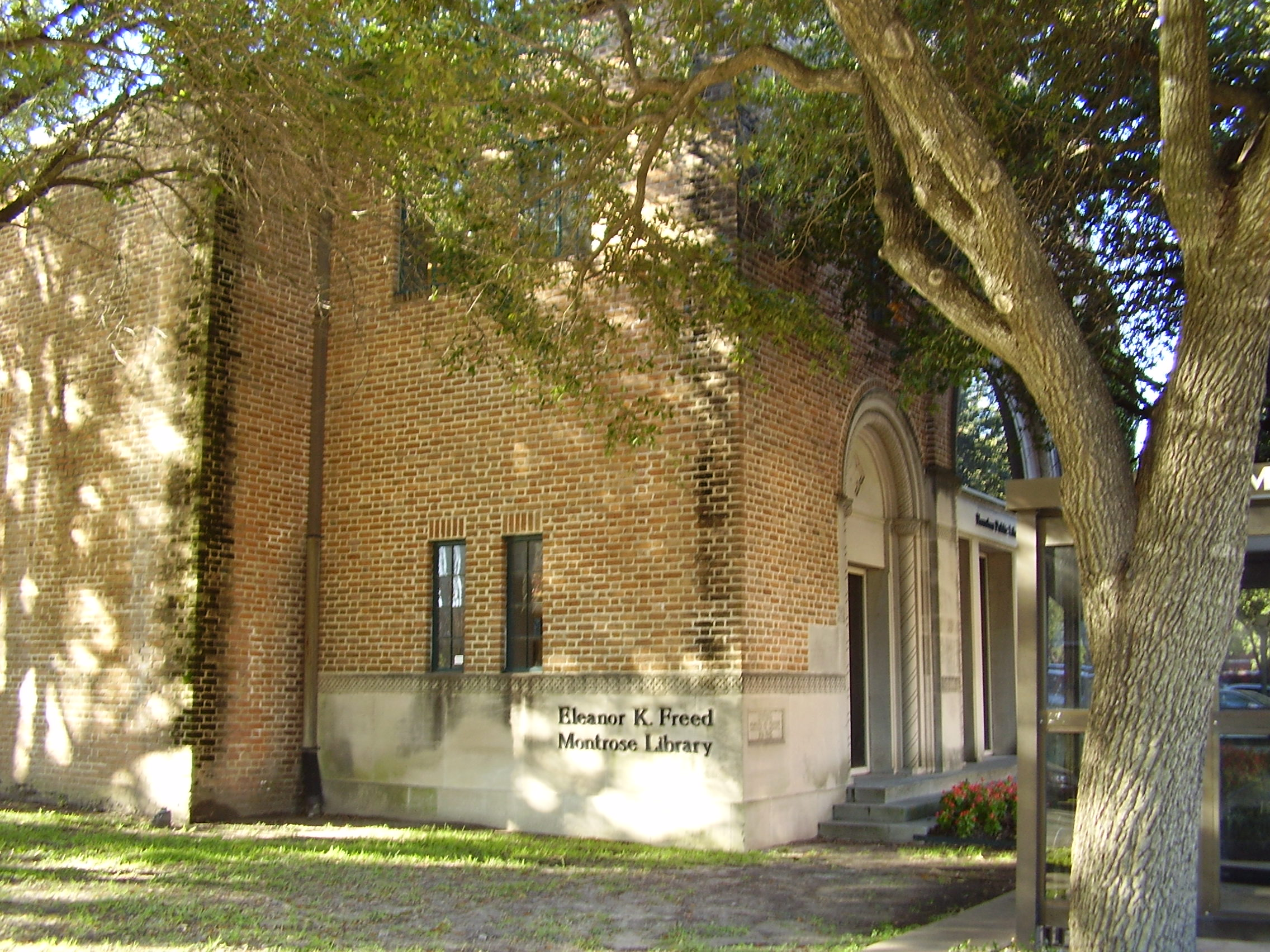
Freed-Montrose Neighborhood Library

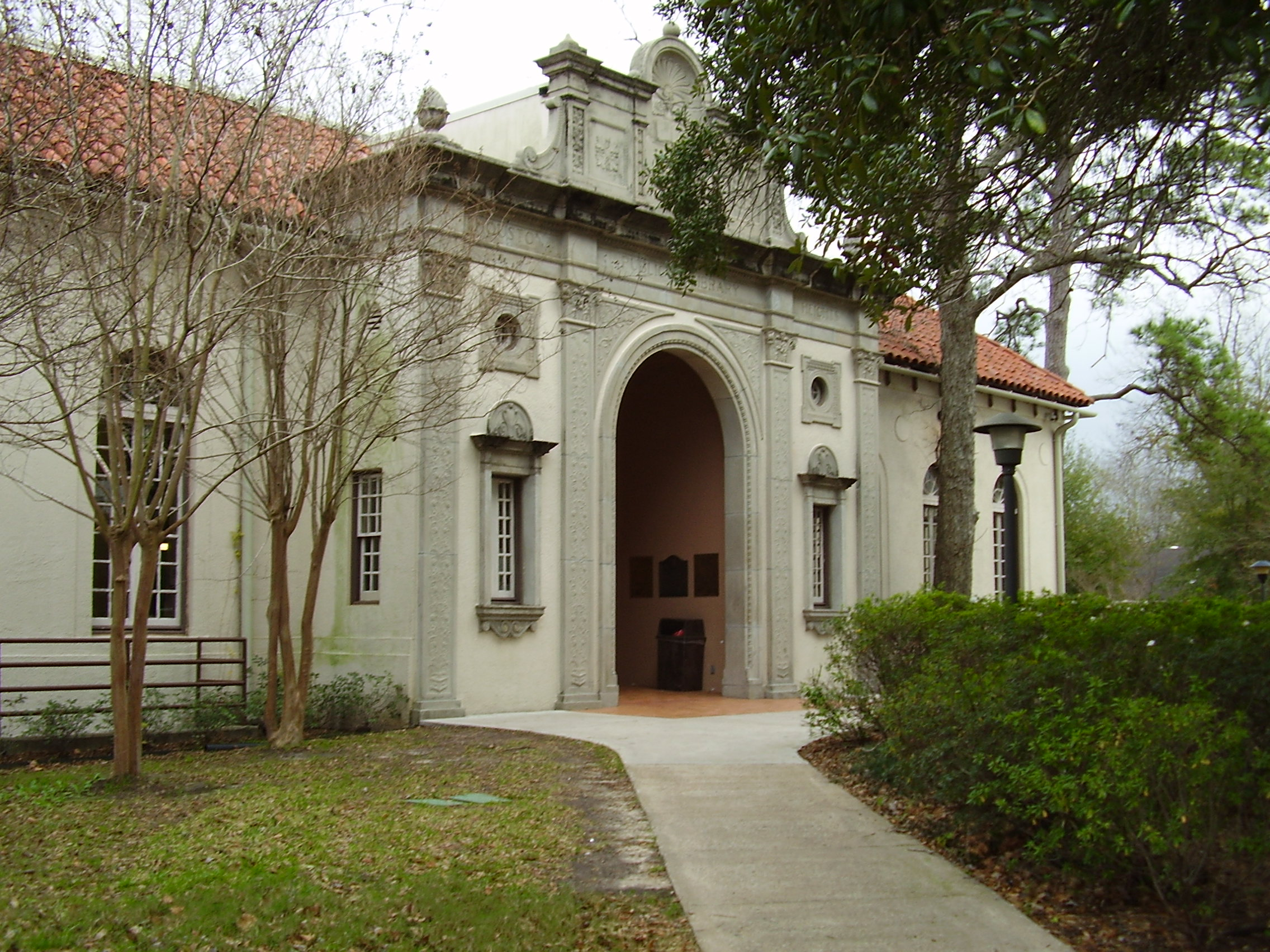
Heights Neighborhood Library

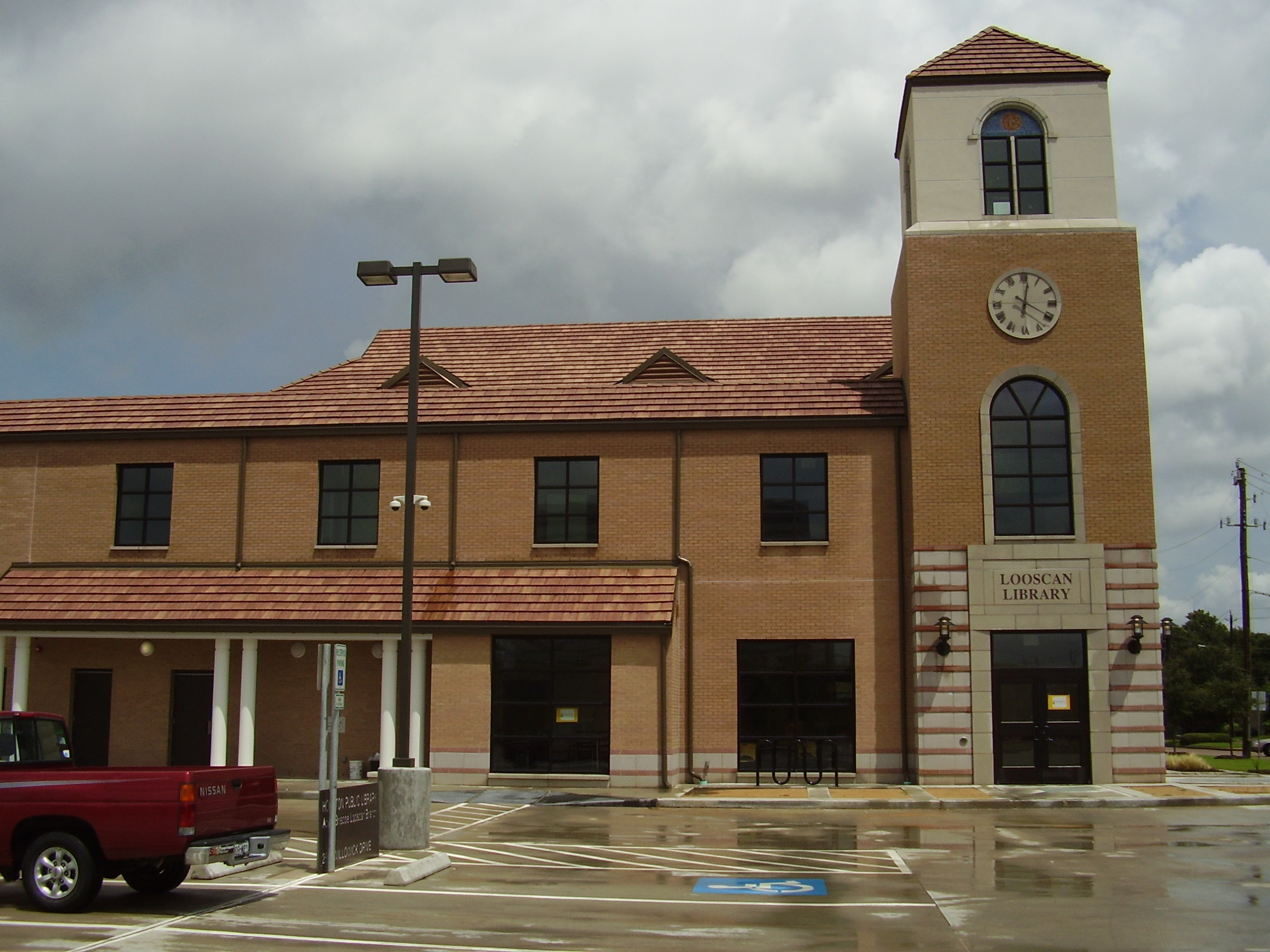
Looscan Neighborhood Library in River Oaks

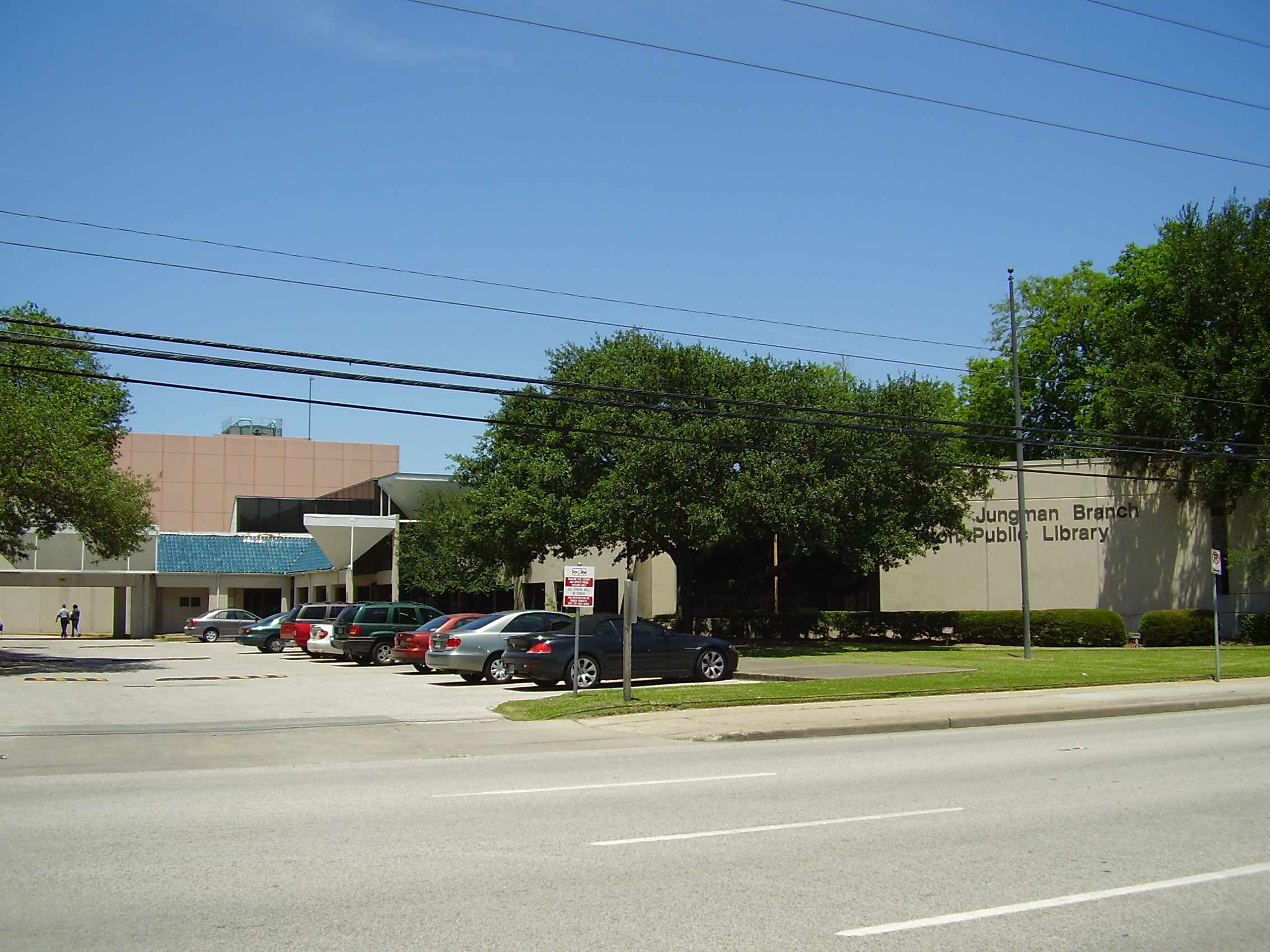
Jungman Neighborhood Library

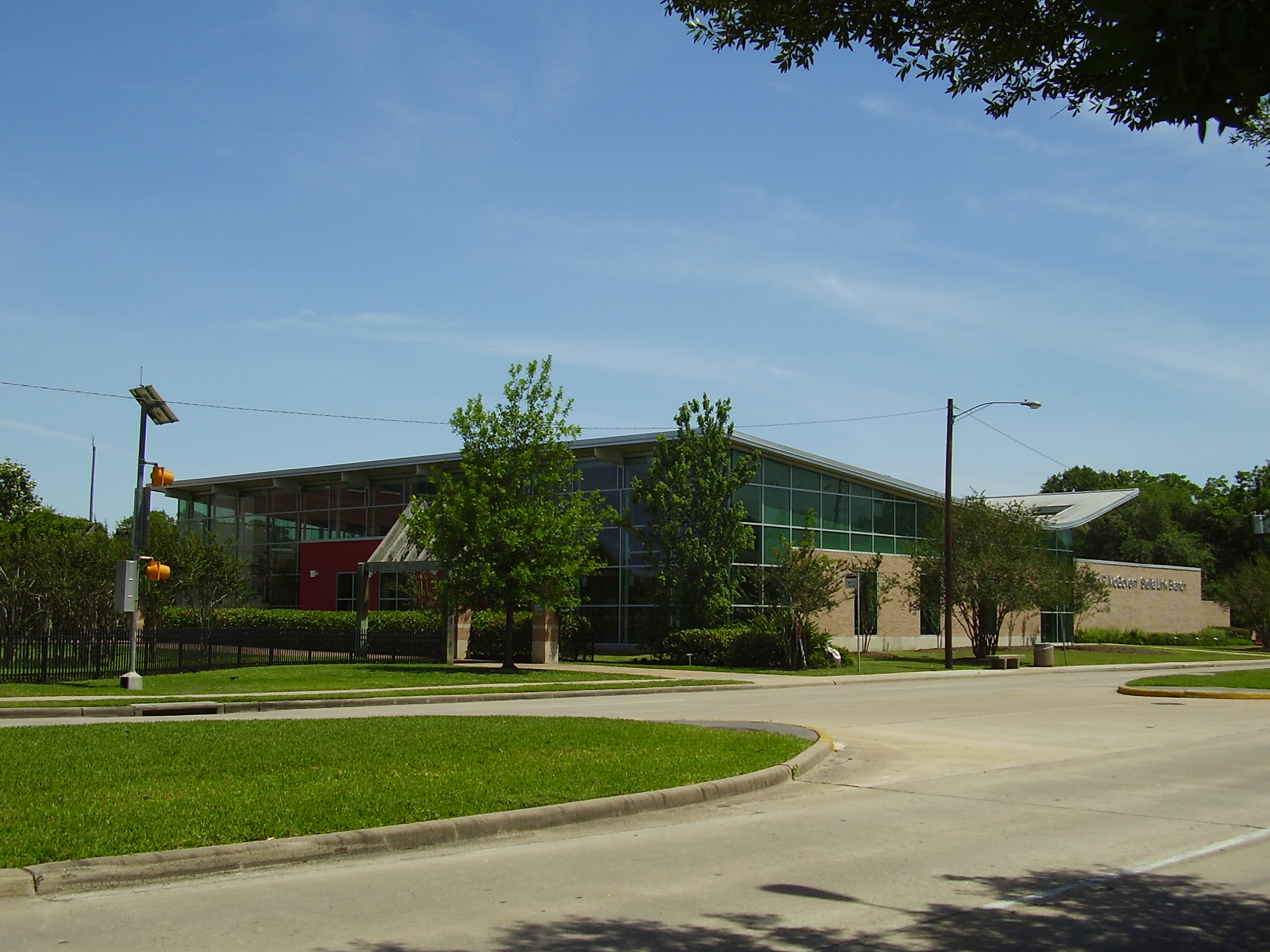
McGovern-Stella Link Neighborhood Library, located in the Braeswood Place neighborhood

In addition to the Central Library and Clayton Library, there are 32 neighborhood libraries, including five regional libraries, all located within the city of Houston.

- J. S. Bracewell Neighborhood Library (Southbelt/Ellington)
- Carnegie Neighborhood Library (Near Northside)
- Everett Collier Regional Library (Northwest Houston)
- Patricio Flores Neighborhood Library (Second Ward)
- Eleanor K. Freed-Montrose Neighborhood Library (Neartown)
  - Eleanor K. Freed-Montrose Neighborhood Library was at 4100 Montrose Boulevard. The library was housed in a former church, the Central Church of Christ. The bell tower or campanile is located by the front door of the library although the bell is gone, and there is a small colonnade connecting the main church-library building to former church meeting rooms and offices. Facing Montrose Boulevard, the original stained glass window of the church can be seen featuring a dove with an olive branch in its beak. A modern office building complex in the surrounding area is known as The Campanile, named after the bell tower in the library. In 2013 there were plans for a renovation. However, they were shelved upon consideration of the cost of upgrading the building's infrastructure. Instead, as of 2019, the city is moving forward with plans for a new library facility along Westheimer Road. The facility will be in the multi-purpose Montrose Collective development which will also have retail. In March 2024, the library system closed the church-based Freed-Montrose, stating that concerns about safety were the reason for the closure. The new Freed-Montrose Library opened on December 14, 2024.
- Heights Neighborhood Library (Houston Heights)
- David M. Henington-Alief Regional Library (Alief)
- Arnold L. Hillendahl Neighborhood Library (Spring Branch)
- W. L. D. Johnson Neighborhood Library (Sunnyside)
- J. Frank Jungman Neighborhood Library (Uptown)
- Belle Sherman Kendall Neighborhood Library (Memorial)
- Adele Briscoe Looscan Neighborhood Library (River Oaks) - The current building opened in September 2007. The former library, established in 1956, closed on August 27, 2005, and was demolished in February 2006. The previous Looscan branch had around 61,000 visitors in the fiscal year 2005. The original plans for Looscan called for the library to get a $5.4 million renovation. An Upper Kirby group proposed a new site near the Upper Kirby YMCA. Around that period the group Friends of Neighborhood Libraries began raising funds. The replacement library, costing $6.2 million, has twice the staff and two and one half times the size of the previous facility. Friends of Neighborhood Libraries raised one million dollars in four months, and around $2.5 million in total to help fund the new library. The 21,000 square feet (2,000 m^{2}) library, designed by Jackson & Ryan Architects, houses over 60,000 books and is the first city LEED-certified facility. It includes a 120-seat multipurpose meeting room and a 14-seat private conference room. The library has several reading areas, including the Marsha Moody Children's Reading Room, a teenager reading area, and a periodical reading area. The exterior was designed to match visual cues of buildings in the surrounding area, such as the River Oaks Baptist Church and School. The Emily Scott and Joseph Wood Evans Clock Tower, a part of the library's exterior, includes a garden book archive and works of art.
- Frank O. Mancuso Neighborhood Library
- Eva Alice McCrane-Kashmere Gardens Neighborhood Library (Kashmere Gardens)
- John P. McGovern-Stella Link Regional Library (Braeswood Place) - The library, named after physician John P. McGovern, opened on January 8, 2005. The Houston Business Journal awarded the library a Landmark Award for Community Impact in 2006. In 2007 and 2010 the Houston Press ranked the branch the "Best Public Library Branch." The McGovern Library closed after Hurricane Harvey hit Houston in 2017. Its tentative reopening is in 2019.
- Lucile Y. Melcher Neighborhood Library (Pecan Park)
- Nettie Moody Neighborhood Library (Northside)
- Oak Forest Neighborhood Library (Oak Forest)
- Park Place Regional Library (Park Place)
- Pleasantville Neighborhood Library (Pleasantville)
- Elizabeth L. Ring Neighborhood Library (Spring Branch)
- Judson W. Robinson-Westchase Neighborhood Library (Westchase)
- Scenic Woods Regional Library (Scenic Woods)
- Beulah Shepard-Acres Homes Neighborhood Library (Acres Homes)
- Lonnie E. Smith Neighborhood Library (Third Ward)
- Nena Stanaker Neighborhood Library (Magnolia Park)
- Sherman E. Stimley-Blue Ridge Neighborhood Library (Blue Ridge)
- Cliff Tuttle Neighborhood Library (Denver Harbor)
- William A. Vinson Neighborhood Library
- Dr. Shannon Walker Library (Westbury).
- M. E. Walter Neighborhood Library (Sharpstown)
- Alice McKean Young Neighborhood Library (Palm Center, near South Park)

==== Special libraries ====
- African American Library at the Gregory School
- Clayton Library Center for Genealogical Research
- Houston Metropolitan Research Center

==== Former locations ====
- Colored Carnegie Library (Opened 1912, became HPL branch in 1921, officially closed on July 31, 1961, demolished 1962 and replaced with an extension of Clay Avenue)
- Morris Frank Library (Fondren Southwest). Replaced by an HPL Express location, which in turn was, in 2023, replaced by the Walker Library.
- George B. Meyer Neighborhood Library (Meyerland/Westbury) - The library opened in 1962. In 1994 the library received renovations to accommodate disabled people. By 2013 HPL planned to purchase land for a new Meyerland branch with $442,000. HPL spokesperson Sandra Fernandez stated that HPL wants to build a new facility in order to increase the size and parking capacity. There is a proposal to move the library to Westbury Square in Westbury, supported by the Westbury community but opposed by Meyerland residents. In 2015 various proposals on where the replacement library should go were being debated. Prior to Hurricane Harvey in 2017, the Houston community considered the Meyer Branch to be the Houston library in the poorest state of maintenance. Hurricane Harvey gave the library moderate damage, and the city government closed it afterwards, with demolition scheduled. The new library, which will also replace HPL Express Frank, will be at 5505 Belrose on a 2.5-acre (1.0 ha) plot of land in Westbury.
- Lakewood Neighborhood Library (Closed 2017 after Hurricane Harvey)
- Amanda E. Dixon Neighborhood Library (Houston Gardens) (Closed in 2017 after Hurricane Harvey. The old library building was torn down for the new Dixon TechLink.)
- Fifth Ward Neighborhood Library (Fifth Ward)

=== Partnership libraries ===
In addition, HPL has a partnership with the Harris County Public Library's Clear Lake City-County Freeman Branch Library in the Clear Lake City community of Houston.

Also, the Parent Resource Library in the Children's Museum of Houston is considered part of the Houston Public Library system; however, its staff are employed by the museum, rather than the City of Houston.

In partnership with the Harris County Public Library, which will operate the branch, the Kingwood Branch in Kingwood is a "City-County" branch in exchange for $4.2 million to fund the building of a new 30,000-square-foot (2,800 m^{2}) facility. At the time of its completion, the existing branch will be converted into a community center.

=== HPL Express locations ===
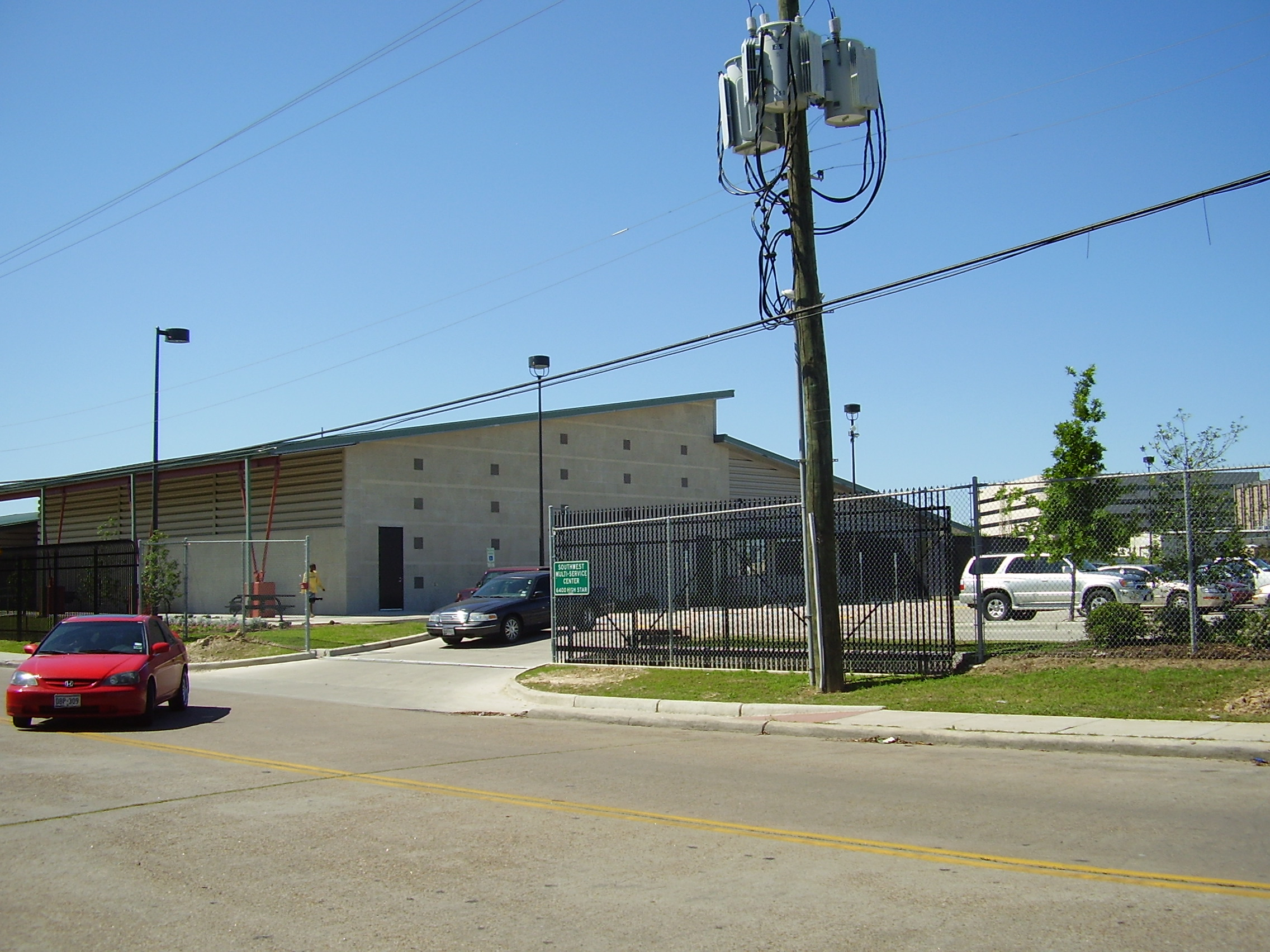
Southwest Multi-Service Center, which includes HPL Express Southwest

HPL Express locations are library facilities located within existing buildings. Each express location contains three areas: one book center, one computer center, and one classroom facility.

Express locations:

- HPL Express Discovery Green
- HPL Express Southwest (opened in fall 2007)
- HPL Express Vinson (opening fall 2009) - Located in a 42,000-square-foot (3,900 m^{2}) facility in the South Post Oak Multi-Service Center, adjacent to the new Vinson Neighborhood Library; the total library facility will be double the size of the original Vinson facility.

Former express locations:

- Morris Frank Library, an HPL Express Location (Fondren Southwest) - Located in a 12,000-square-foot (1,100 m^{2}) section of the first floor of the Brays Oaks Towers. It replaced the formerly standalone Frank Library. In 2023 it was replaced by the Walker Library.

=== HPL Mobile Express ===
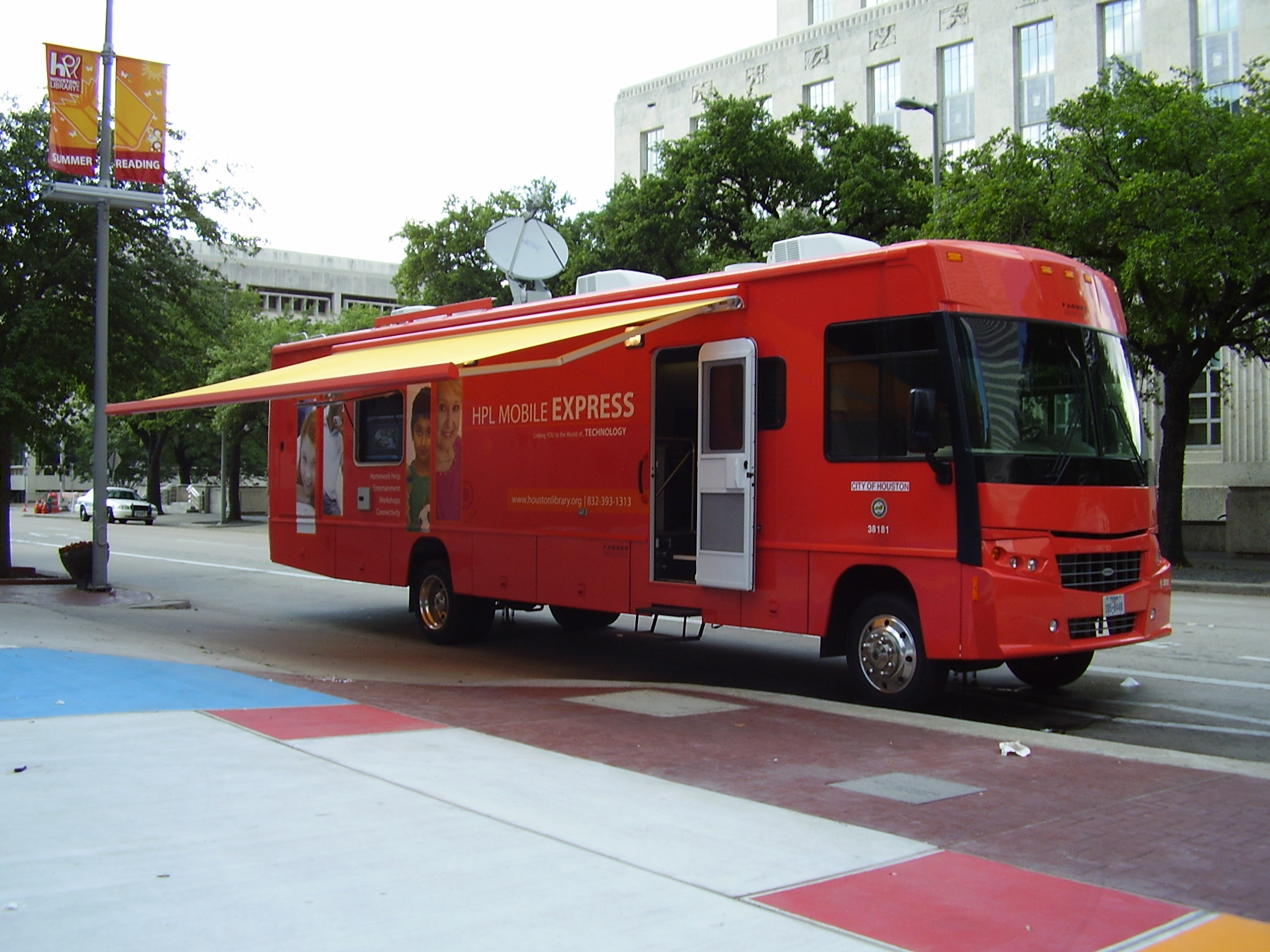
HPL Mobile Express

The HPL Mobile Express is a mobile computer training laboratory.

== Gallery ==
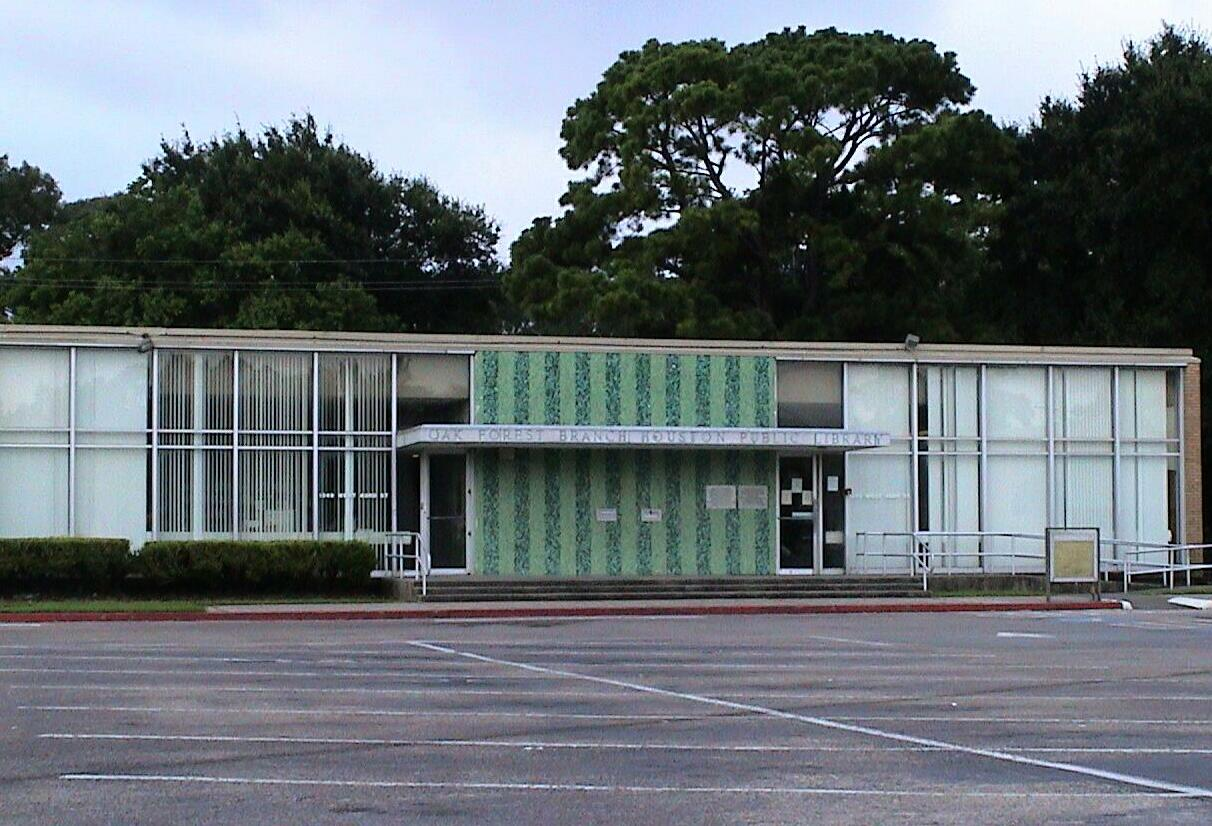
Oak Forest Neighborhood Library

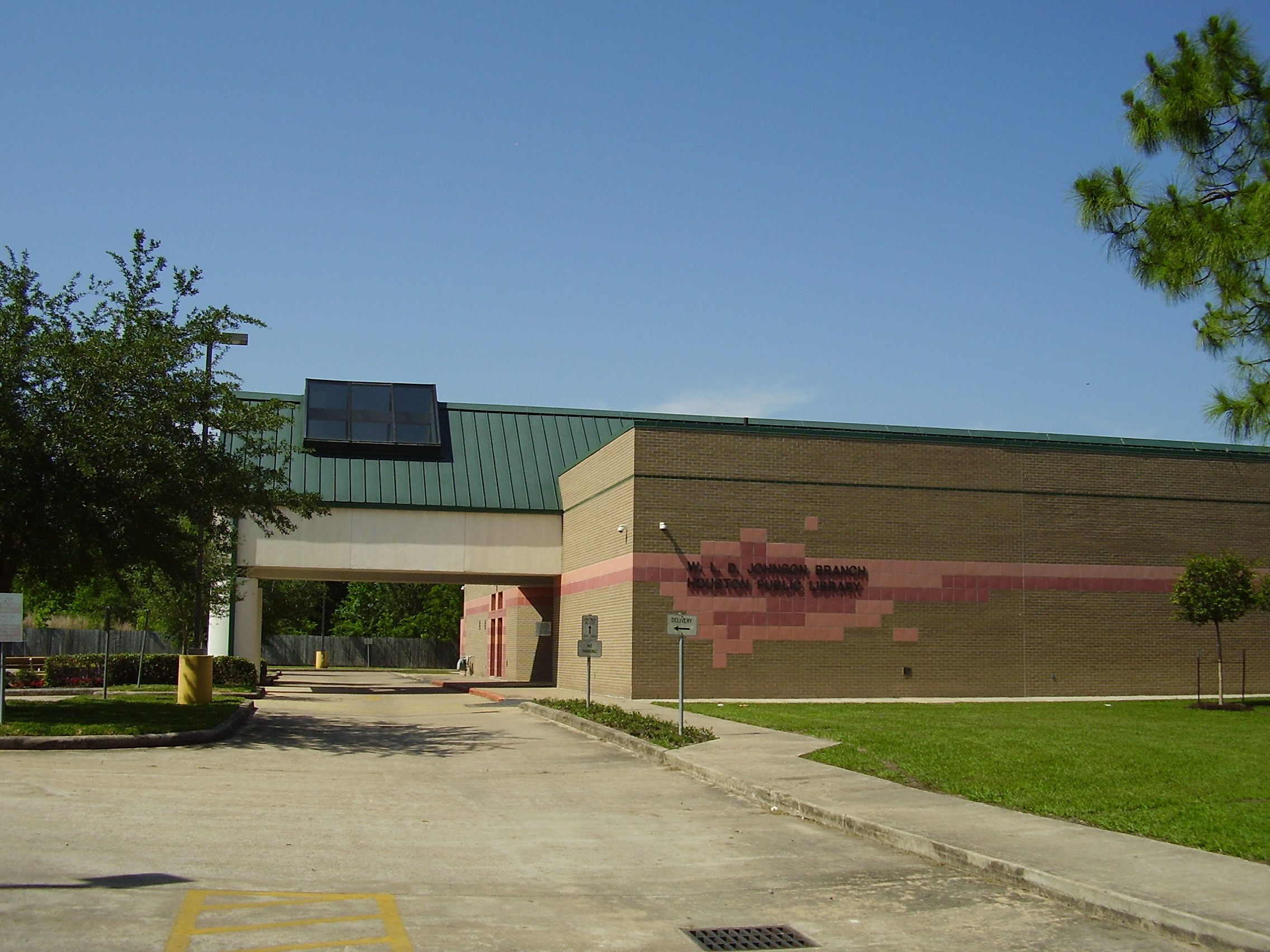
W. L. D. Johnson Neighborhood Library

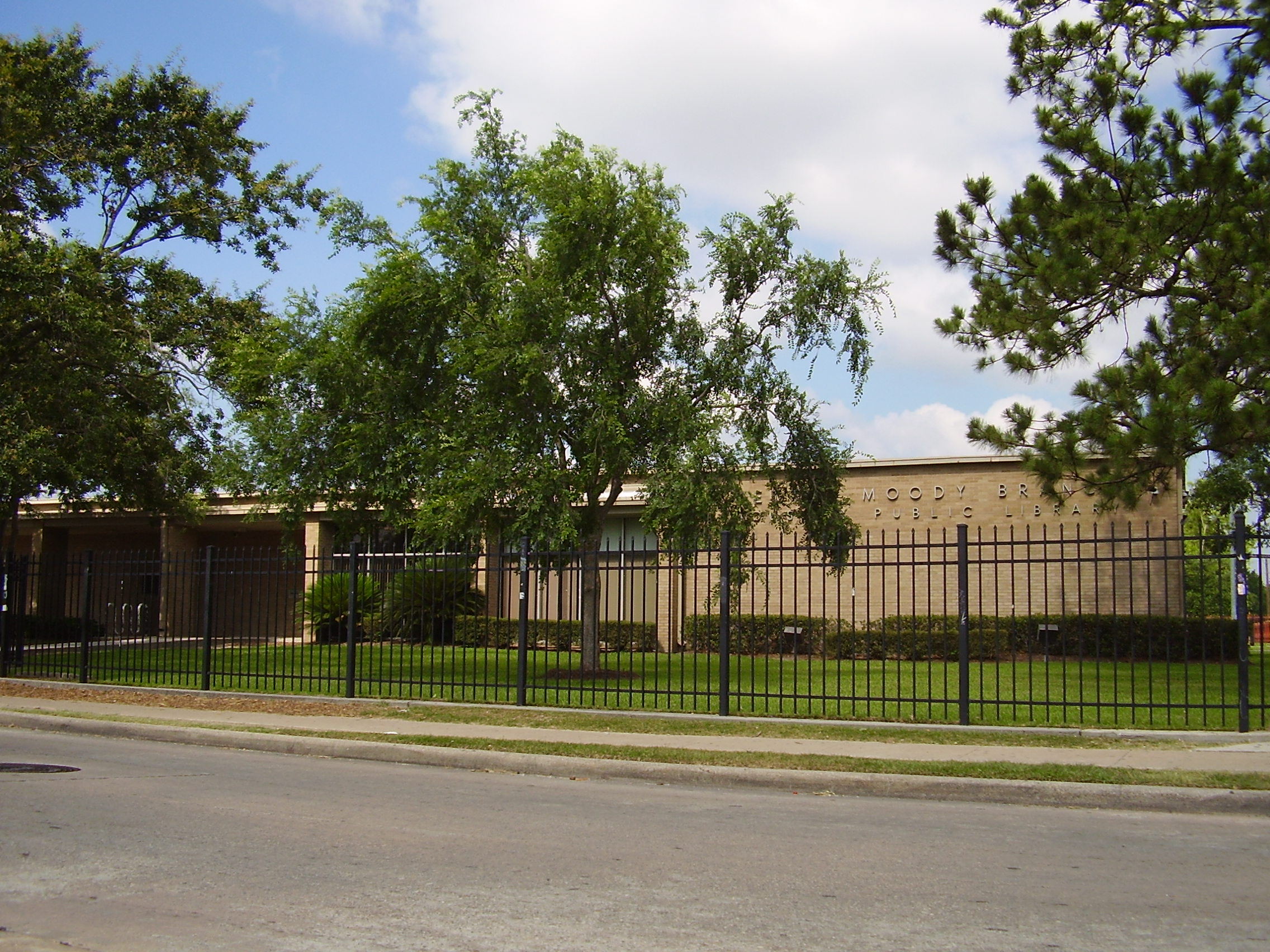
Moody Library

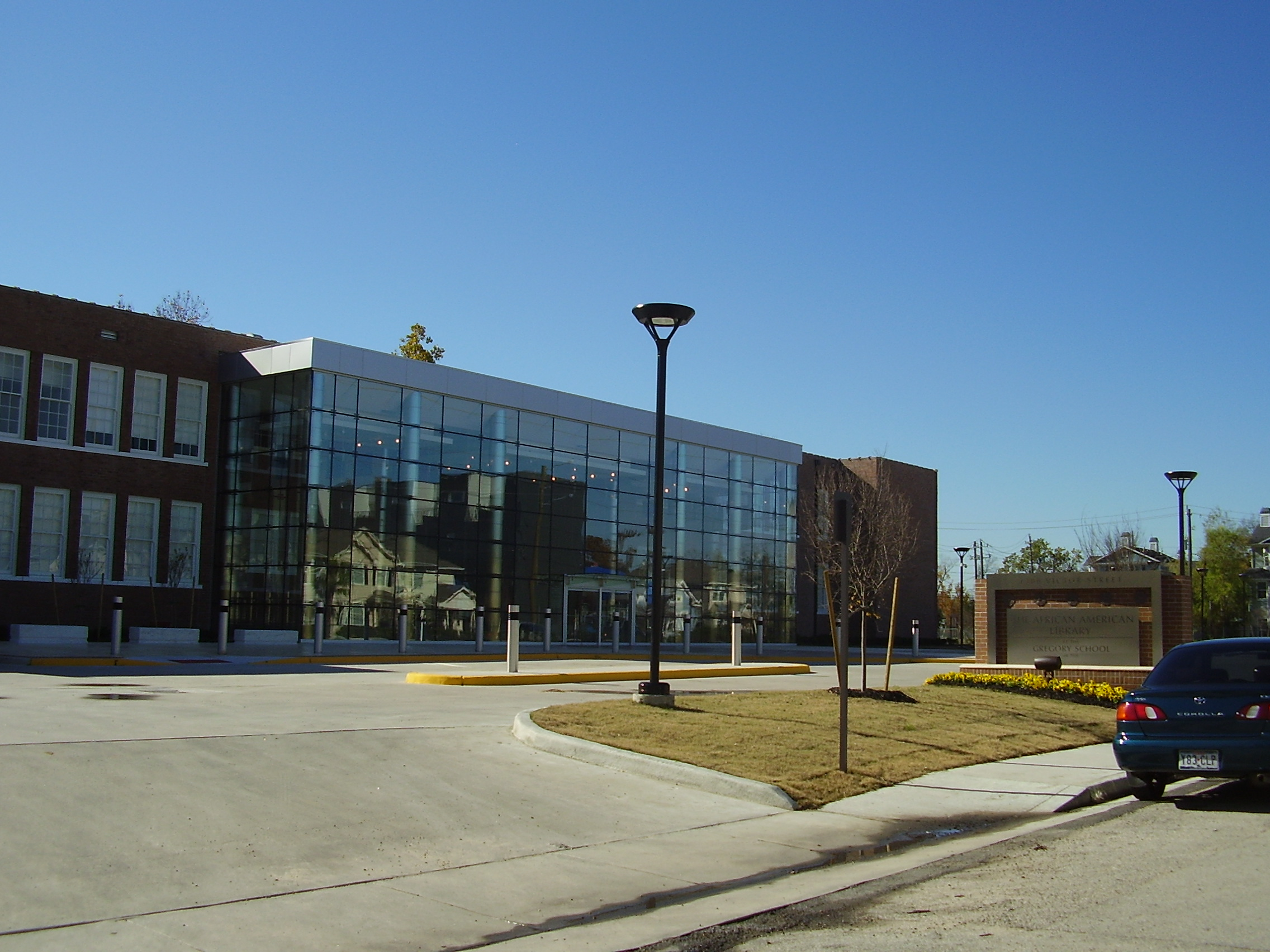
African American Library at the Gregory School

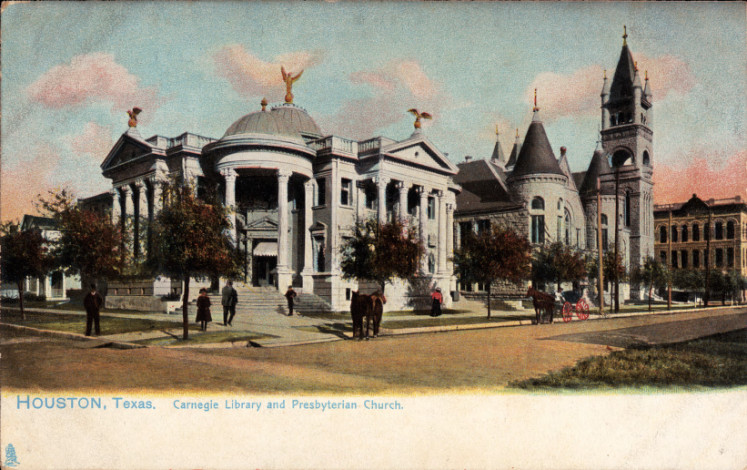
Carnegie Library, Houston, TX, circa 1900-1924
