= Meyerland, Houston =

Community in Houston, Texas

Coordinates: 29.6850°N 95.4674°W

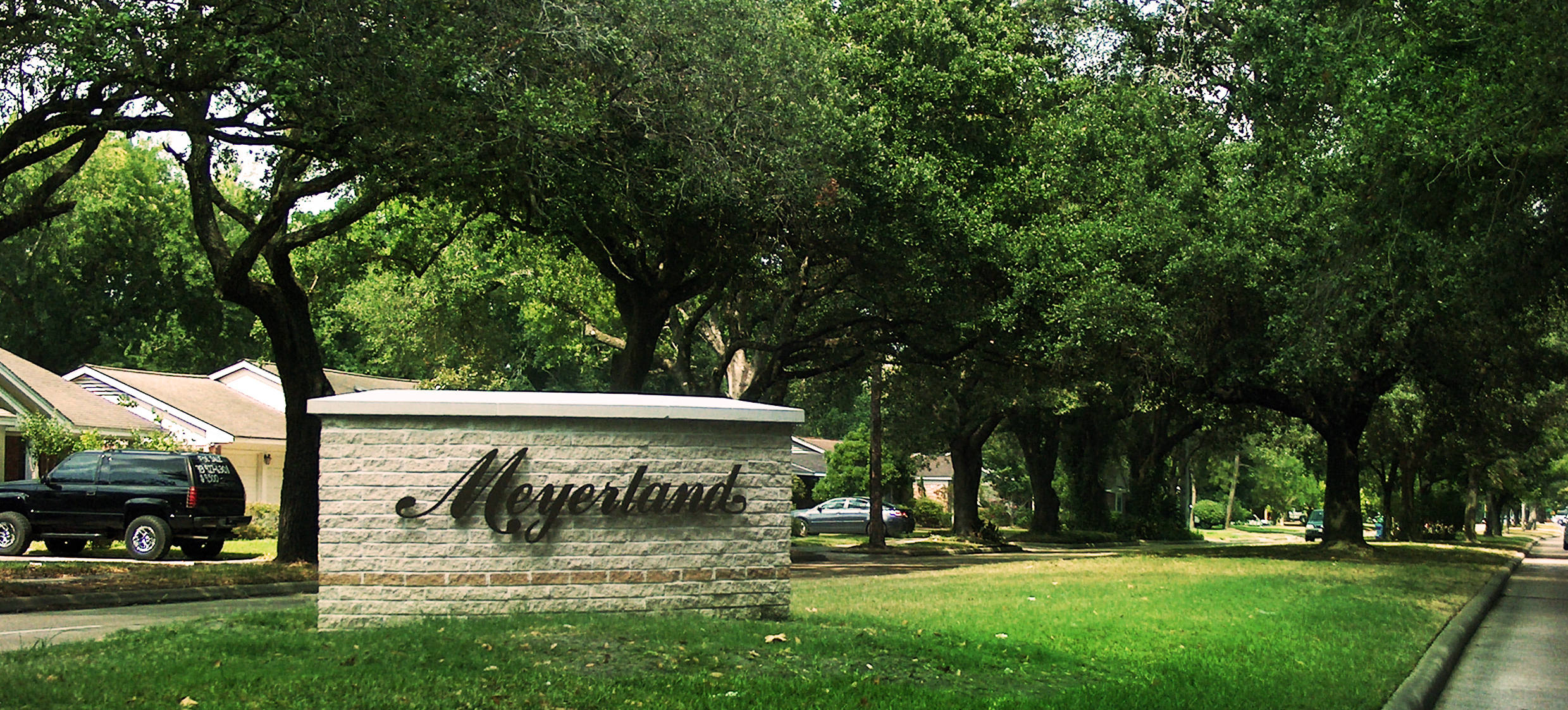
A sign indicating Meyerland

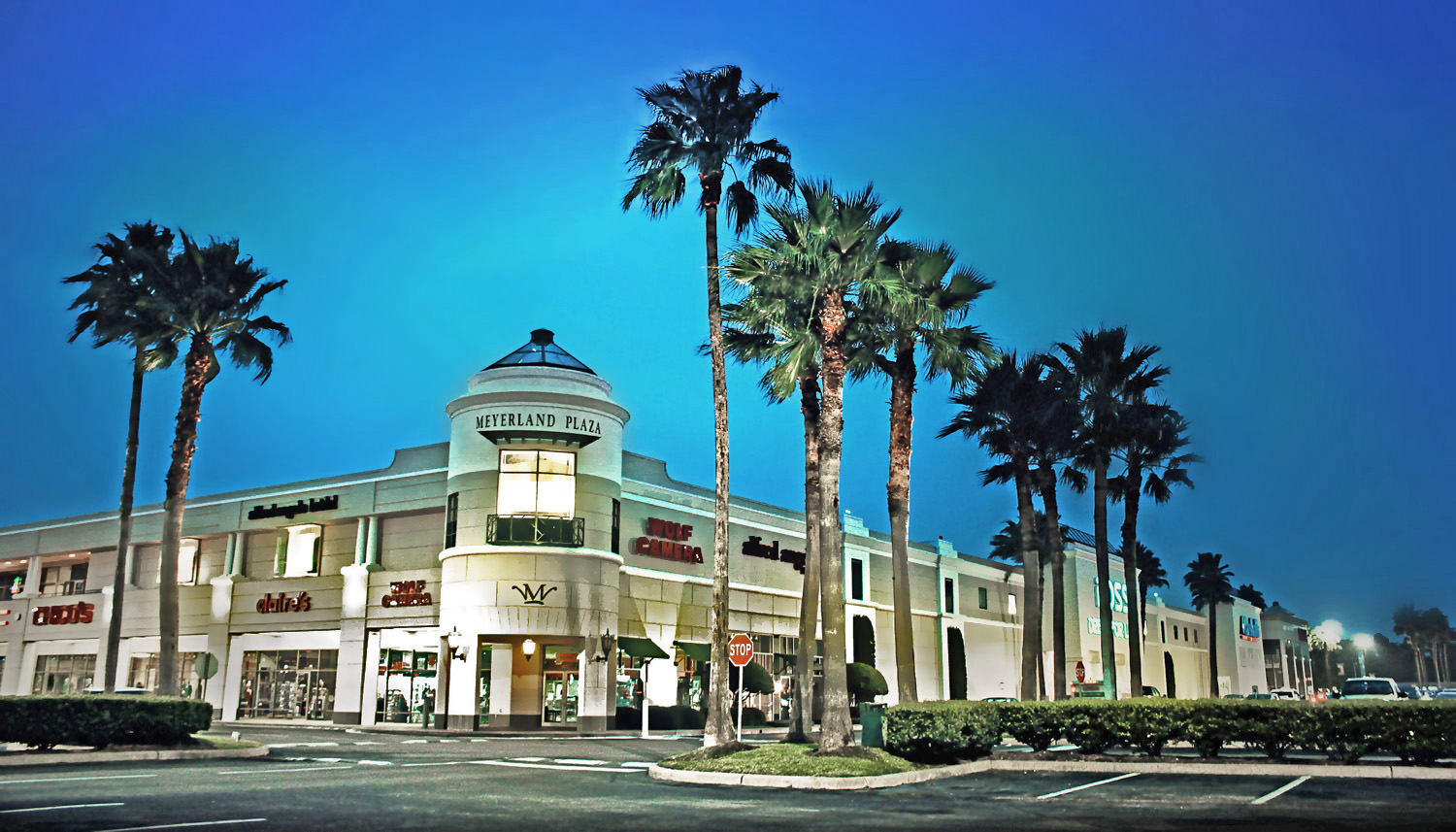
Meyerland Plaza

Meyerland is a community in southwest Houston, Texas, outside of the 610 Loop and inside Beltway 8. The neighborhood is named after the Meyer family, who bought and owned 6,000 acres (24 km^{2}) of land in southwest Houston.

Meyerland is the center of Houston's Jewish community; the Meyerland area is the home of Houston's Jewish Community Center, Congregation Beth Israel, Congregation Beth Yeshurun, and several smaller synagogues. The area is also home to Meyerland Plaza, a large outdoor shopping center.

Meyerland is partially located within the 100-year floodplain, and houses were prone to flooding during heavy rain events. Meyerland was inundated during Hurricane Harvey in 2017, and stories and images of the flooded community were prominent in media coverage of the natural disaster in Houston.

Large scale flood mitigation projects are underway which will greatly benefit Meyerland. Chief amongst such projects is Project Brays, a $400m mega scale flood mitigation project which will remove several Meyerland homes from 100 year flood plain.

Additional projects completed or announced in the mid‑2020s include the Meyergrove Detention Basin—completed in 2024—and a 2025 land‑swap agreement between Houston and Bellaire that will create new stormwater detention facilities

Circa 2018 several new homes are being built in Meyerland and the neighborhood is seeing strong new home construction. Luxury homes over $1m in value are being built several feet above the minimum base flood elevation.

== History ==
The subdivision was formerly rice fields. Joseph F. Meyer Sr. originally acquired the land in sections beginning around 1885.

The land was unused for many years, although part of it was leased to farmers and cattlemen. Joseph Meyer was confident that one day his holdings would be within the Houston city limits.

After Joseph’s death in 1933, the land was divided among his three sons, George, Frank and Joseph Jr. It was not until 20 years after the father’s death that George Meyer decided to develop his share of the land.

On September 24, 1954, the Meyerland Community Improvement Association, a Texas non-profit corporation, was formed. George Meyer developed 1,200 acres (5 km^{2}) of the fields into the Meyerland subdivision in 1955. Vice President Richard Nixon was at the subdivision's ribbon-cutting ceremony. Meyerland was one of the first deed-restricted communities in the City of Houston. Many white residents were moving away from the Third Ward area, so many houses in Meyerland were sold prior to construction.

On Memorial Day, May 30, 1961, the "Hero Tree" was dedicated as a living memorial to Capt. Gary L. Herod for his heroism. The tree and a stone marker are located near Meyerland Plaza shopping center on Beechnut Street.

On February 16, 1967, the Meyerland State Bank (now a BBVA Compass) was robbed. The bank initially believed it lost $62,211, which would have made it the most severe bank robbery in Houston at the time. The bank staff later realized that $13,000 of that was in the wrong location and was not in fact stolen, which meant it was Houston's second-most severe bank robbery.

According to Chris Lane of the Houston Press, while many Houston neighborhoods that were considered desirable in 2014 had experienced a period of decline before being gentrified, Meyerland itself had never declined even though Meyerland Plaza had experienced turmoil in the 1980s. In the mid to late 1980s families who began moving into Meyerland and Bellaire began to tear down older homes and build new ones.

A string of over twelve robberies affected Meyerland from April 23, 1989 until June 19, 1989. On June 20, 1989 a suspect, Timothy Dion Morant, had been arrested, and confessed to the crime spree. The group of robbers targeted Meyerland since the houses had valuables, and the community was in proximity to the 610 Loop and other major thoroughfares, providing easy avenues for escape. Morant said that he committed half of the robberies, while his accomplices, many of whom were young men originating from the Hiram Clarke area, committed the other half. Area residents used their funds to hire private patrols, causing crime rates to decrease. After families moved in, children who were caught speeding or with illegal substances told police that they were from Meyerland in an effort to get police to treat them more leniently. Stephen Klineberg, a Rice University sociology professor, stated that as Meyerland became wealthier, the class structure increasingly was "rigidified." At the same time, it was reported in 2006 in Texas Monthly that drugs were "plentiful" in Meyerland.

On Memorial Day, 2015, water from the Brays Bayou flooded Meyerland. Meyerland resident Chris Bell called for an outside investigation on why anti-flooding infrastructure improvements were not completed on time; he argued that the Harris County Flood Control District had assisted with the ReBuild Houston infrastructure program, approved in 2010 in the wake of the 2001 Tropical Storm Allison flooding, and therefore should not be trusted to make a neutral report on the flooding.

In 2017 the Israeli government stated it would spend $1 million to help pay for repairs for damages from Hurricane Harvey sustained by institutions of the Jewish community in Houston. Out of every thirteen Jewish families in Meyerland, one had its house flooded during Harvey.

In 2025 Meyerlanders argued that activity at a few apartment complexes caused an increase in crime in the area, while crime decreased in other areas.

== Cityscape ==
In 2006 Mimi Swartz of the Texas Monthly said that the houses around Godwin Park are "cozy ranch houses from the fifties and sixties in Tudor, colonial, and contemporary variations, comfortable but never showy, with gardens lovingly tended."

== Demographics ==
In the City of Houston-defined Meyerland Super Neighborhood, there were 21,445 residents in 2015. 58% of them were non-Hispanic white, 16% were Hispanics, 13% were non-Hispanic Asians, 11% were non-Hispanic Blacks, and 2% were non-Hispanic others. In 2000 there were 19,841 residents of the super neighborhood. 77% were non-Hispanic White, 9% were Hispanic, 8% were non-Hispanic Asians, 4% were non-Hispanic Blacks, and 2% were non-Hispanic others.

== Government ==
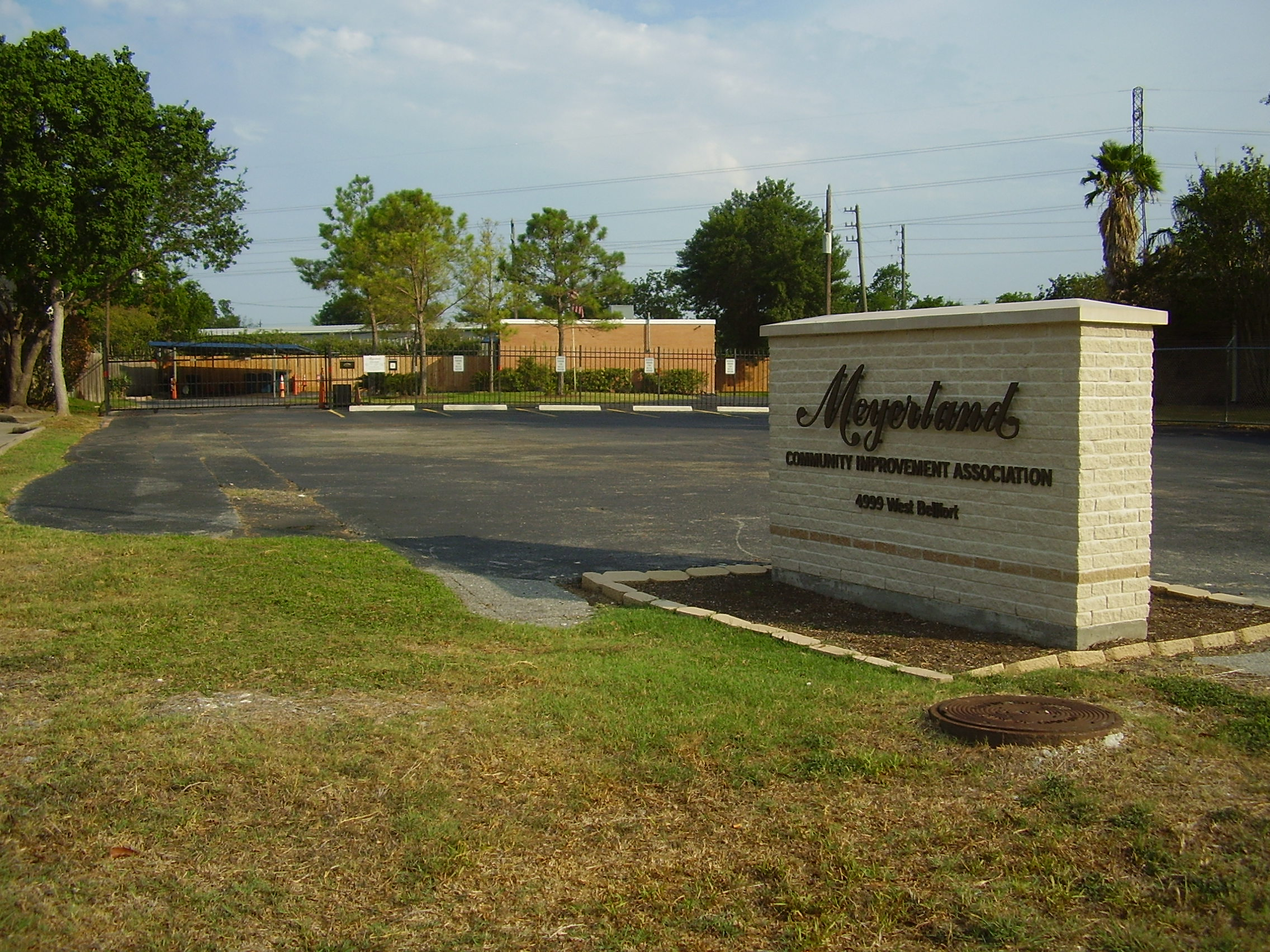
Meyerland Community Improvement Association offices

Meyerland is in Houston City Council District C. In the first 1991 Mayor of Houston election most Meyerland voters voted for Bob Lanier. During the 1997 Mayor of Houston election, about 29% of Meyerland voters voted for Lee P. Brown.

Meyerland is in Texas's 7th congressional district.

Harris Health System (formerly Harris County Hospital District) designated Valbona Health Center (formerly People's Health Center) in Greater Sharpstown for ZIP code 77096. The nearest public hospital is Ben Taub General Hospital in the Texas Medical Center.

== Culture ==
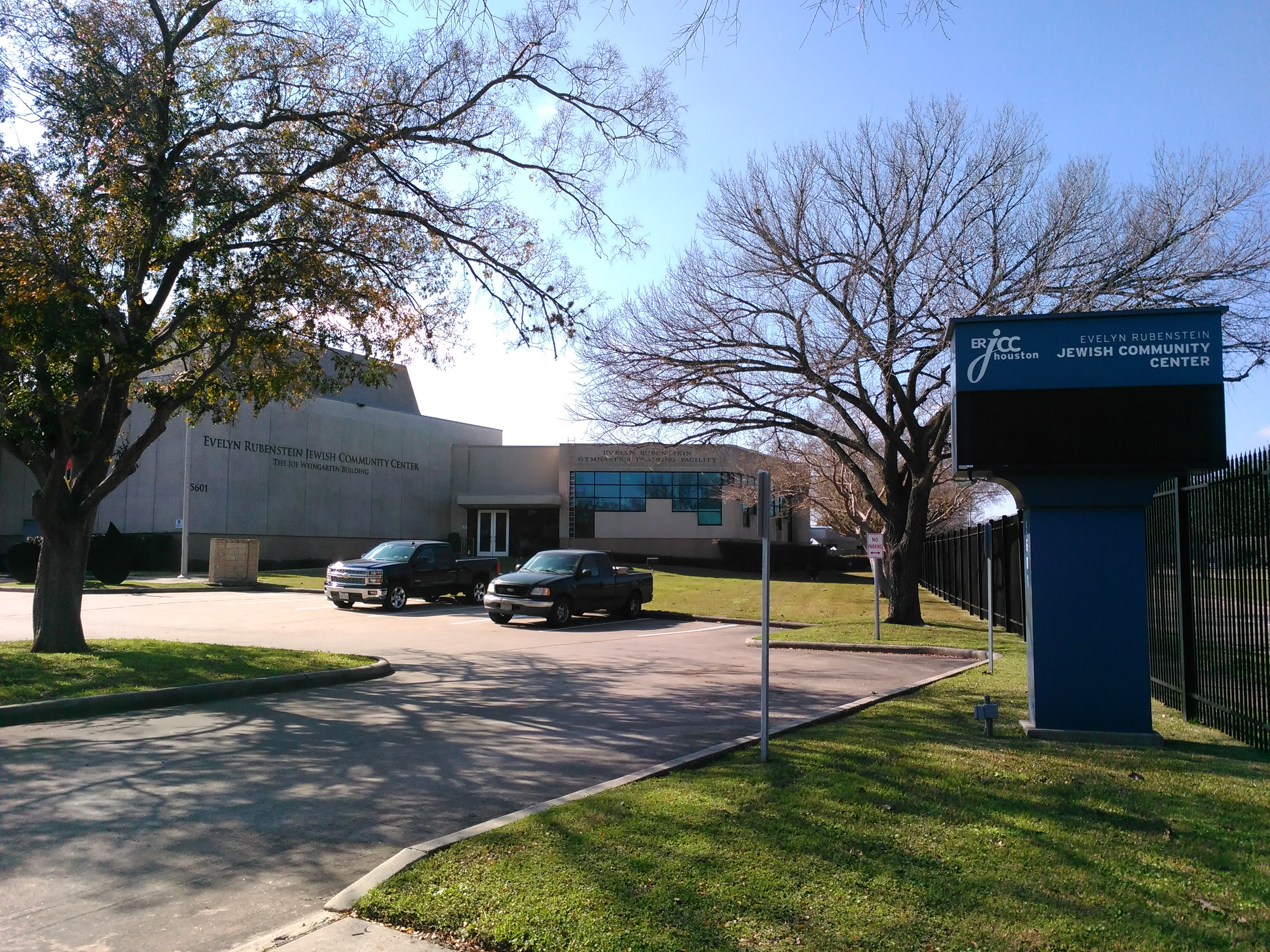
Evelyn Rubenstein Jewish Community Center

The Evelyn Rubenstein Jewish Community Center, Congregation Beth Israel, Congregation Beth Yeshurun, and several small synagogues are in the area. Mimi Swartz of the Texas Monthly said "the neighborhood was a place where Jews could take care of their own and, they believed, could protect their children from negative influences while teaching them to follow religious tradition and embrace the values of family, education, achievement, and community." Every year the Jewish Book and Arts Fair is held in Meyerland.

== Education ==
=== Primary and secondary education ===
In 2022 the Houston Chronicle described the area schools as "sought-after".

==== Public schools ====
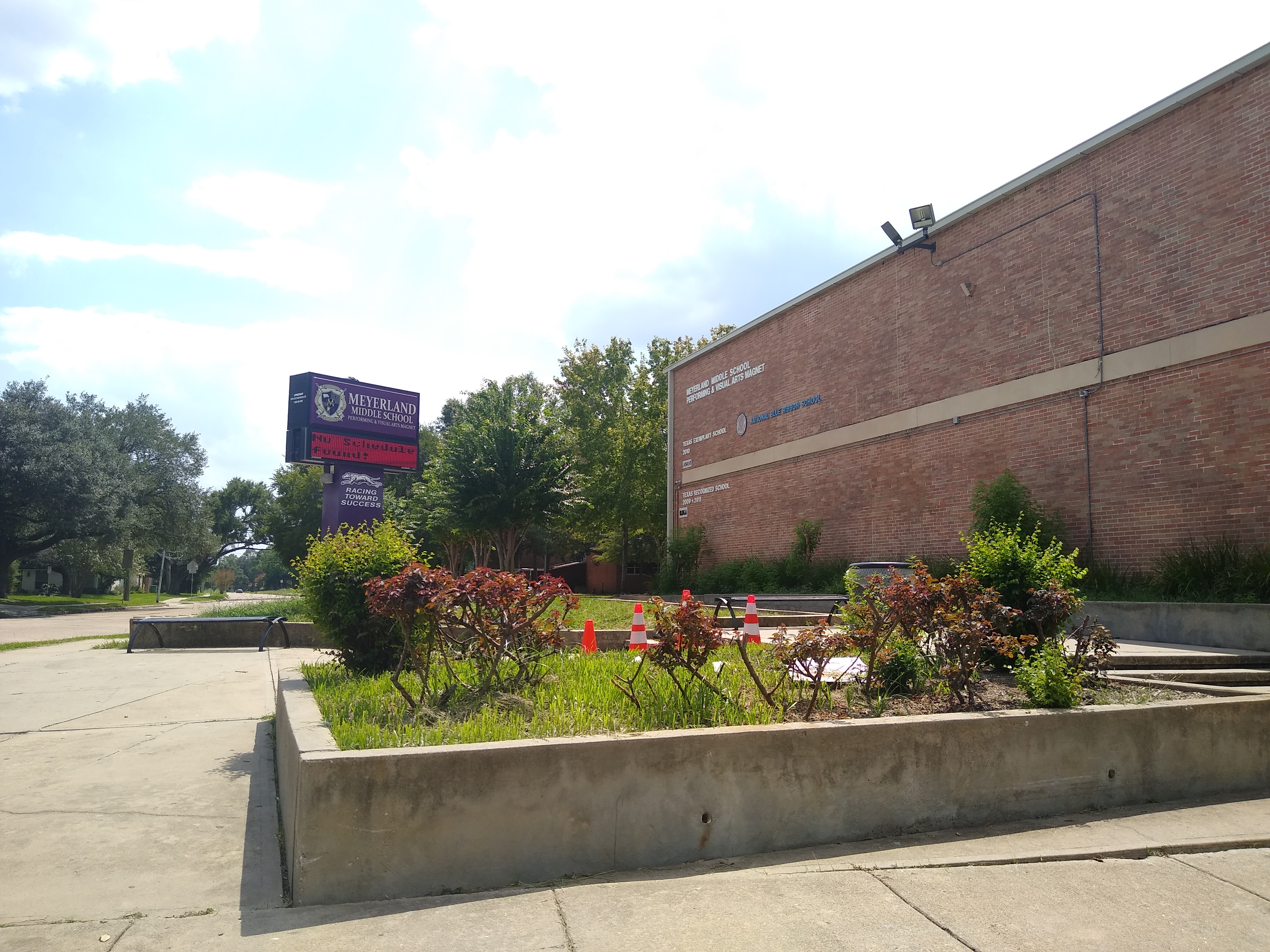
Meyerland Middle School (formerly Johnston Middle School)

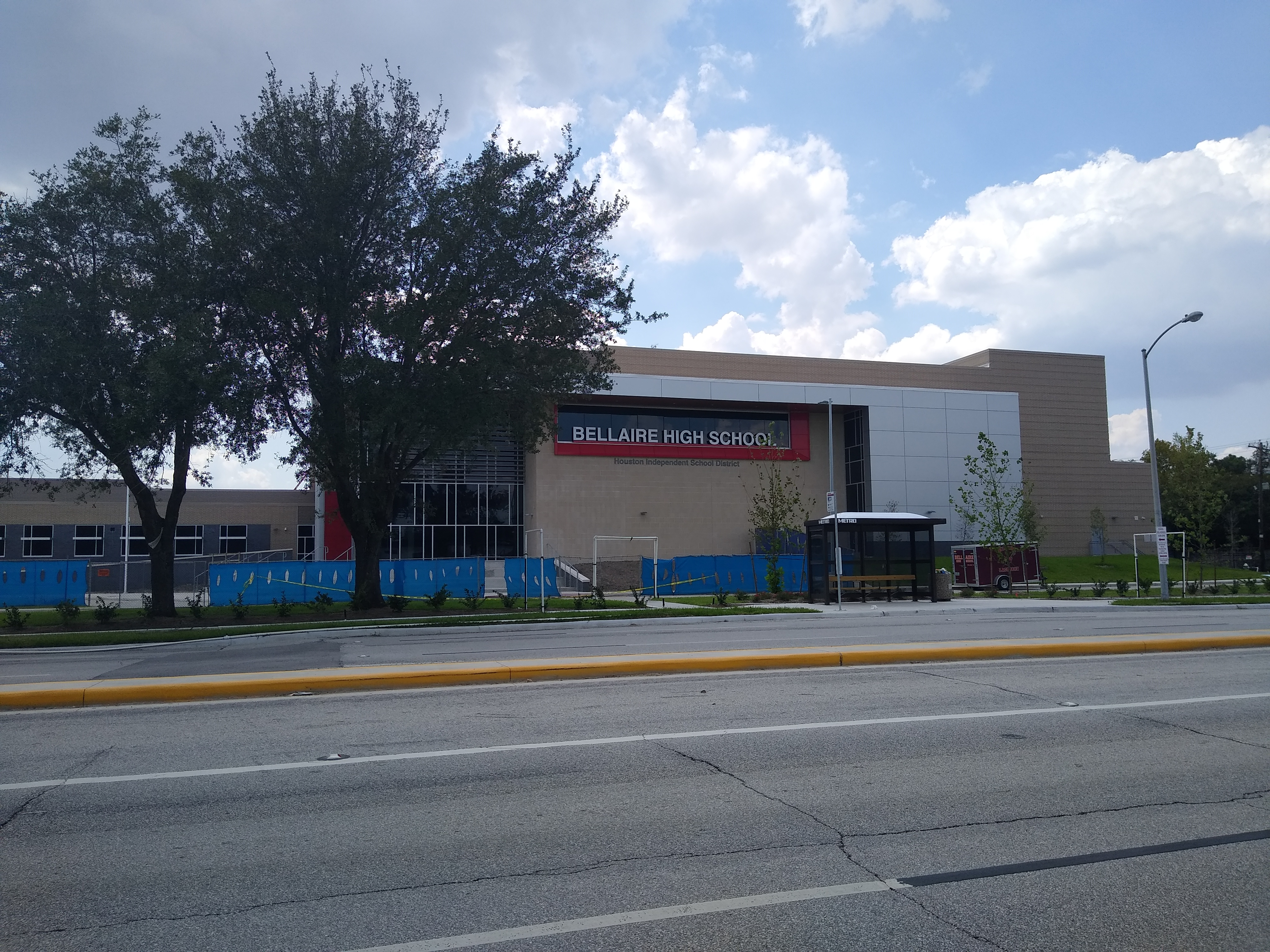
Meyerland residents are zoned to Bellaire High School, located immediately north of Meyerland

The neighborhood is served by several Houston Independent School District (HISD) schools. Coldwell Banker United real estate agent Teresa Lewis stated in a 2010 Houston Chronicle article that "Meyerland has long been recognized for its exemplary and recognized magnet schools."

The portion of the neighborhood north of the Brays Bayou is zoned to Lovett Elementary School; Lovett is located in Section 2. The portion of the neighborhood south of the Brays Bayou is zoned to Kolter Elementary School. The portion of the neighborhood on the west (section 10, which has a western edge boundary of Hillcroft Avenue) is zoned to Herod Elementary School. Herod is located on the edge of Section 10. Lovett was named a National Blue Ribbon School in 2016.

Almost all of the neighborhood is zoned to Meyerland Performing and Visual Arts Middle School (changed from Johnston Middle school in 2016), also located in Meyerland. A small portion is zoned to Pershing Middle School. All students who are zoned to Pershing, Johnston, or Long have the option to apply for the regular program at Pin Oak Middle School in the city of Bellaire. Therefore, Pin Oak Middle School serves most of Meyerland. One section of Meyerland is zoned to Fondren Middle School.

Meyerland residents are zoned to Bellaire High School, which is also in the city of Bellaire. Meyerland is immediately south of Bellaire. Yushang Chang, the author of Newcomer's Handbook Neighborhood Guide: Dallas-Fort Worth, Houston, and Austin, wrote that since Meyerland is zoned to Bellaire one could buy a house and guarantee that one's child could go the school without paying City of Bellaire housing prices and property taxes.

=== History of public schools ===
From the opening of the subdivision in 1955 until 1958, Meyerland residents attended Horn Elementary School in Bellaire. Bellaire High School opened in 1955. Lovett opened in September 1958. Johnston Junior High School opened in 1959. Kolter opened in 1960. Herod Elementary School opened in 1961.

In December 1991, before Christmas, an HISD document was given to an attendance boundary committee convened by the district. The document, labeled as a "draft", illustrated Meyerland being moved into the attendance zone of Westbury High School. This caused panic in Meyerland as the community feared that moving to Westbury, which was less prestigious than Bellaire High, would cause a decrease in property values. On May 21, 1992, the HISD board adopted attendance boundary committee recommendations stating that the Bellaire High attendance zone would not be altered.

The current Herod Elementary building opened in mid-January 2011. The current Lovett building opened in August 2011. The rebuilds of Herod, Lovett, and Horn Elementary of Bellaire together had a cost of $49 million and were a part of a $1 billion bond program approved by HISD voters in 2007.

Due to the effect of Hurricane Harvey on the Kolter campus in 2017, it was rebuilt and opened for students in 2020.

==== Gallery of public schools ====
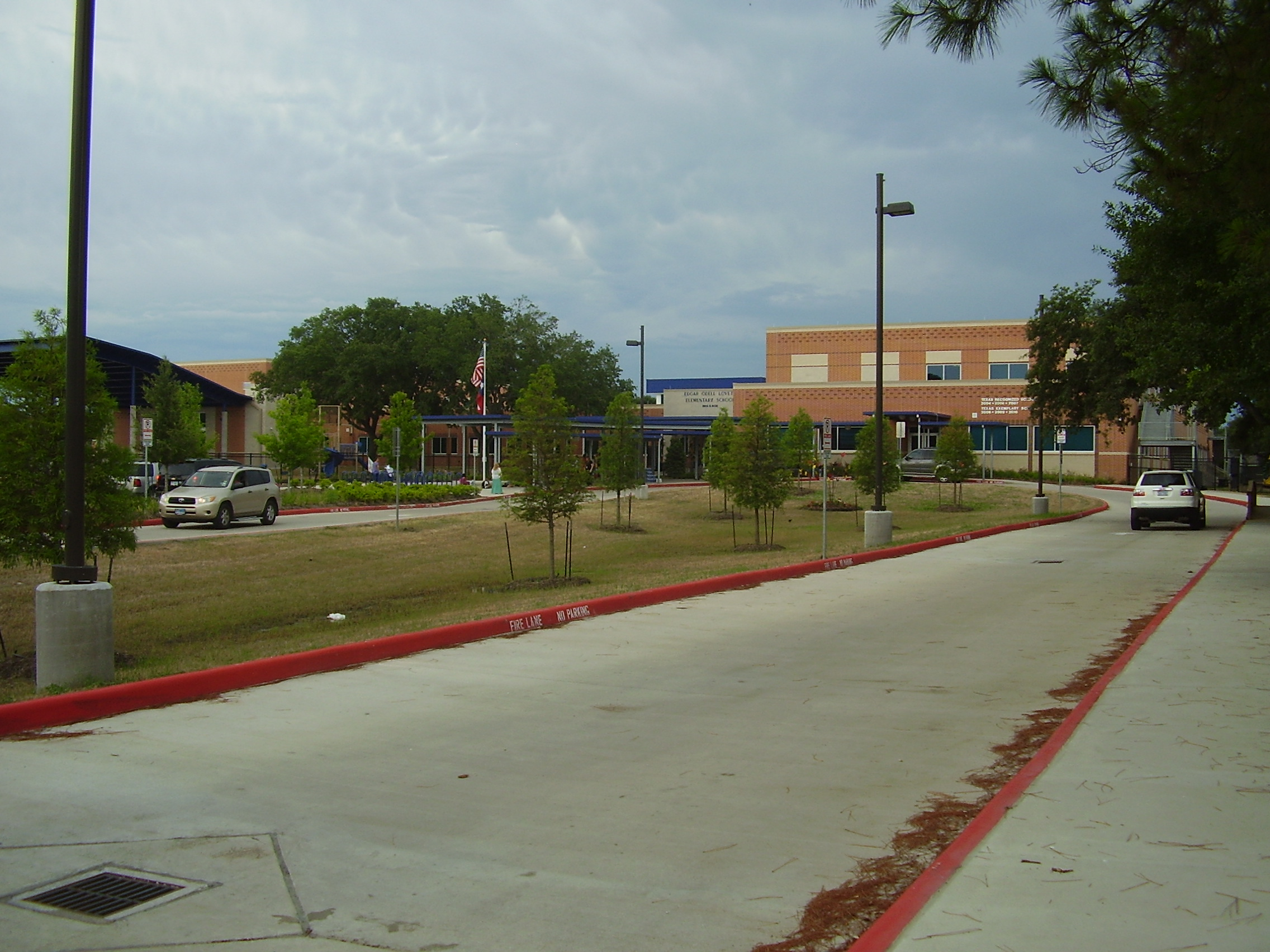
Lovett Elementary School serves portions of Meyerland north of the Brays Bayou

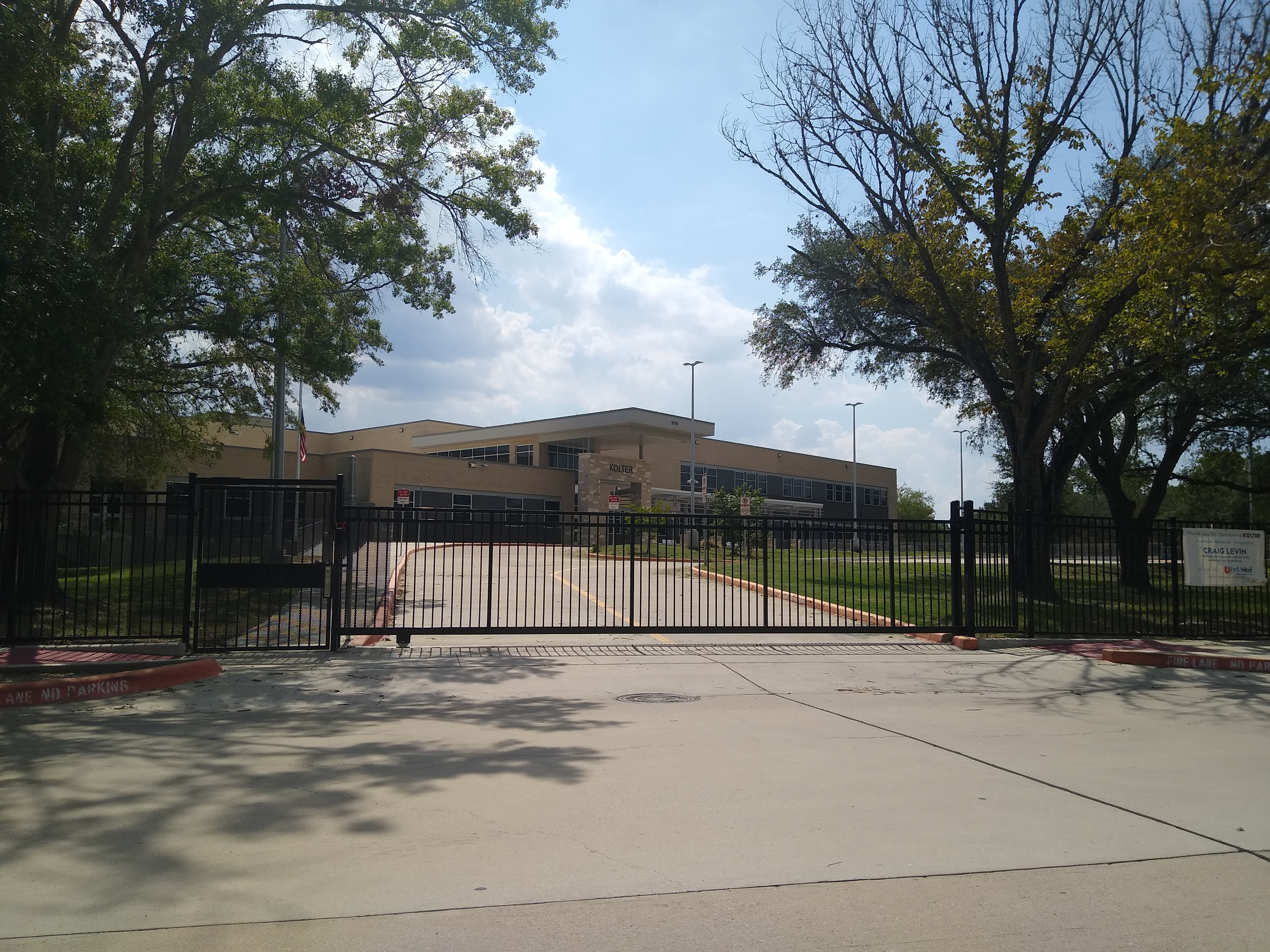
Kolter Elementary School serves portions of Meyerland south of the Brays Bayou

=== Private schools ===
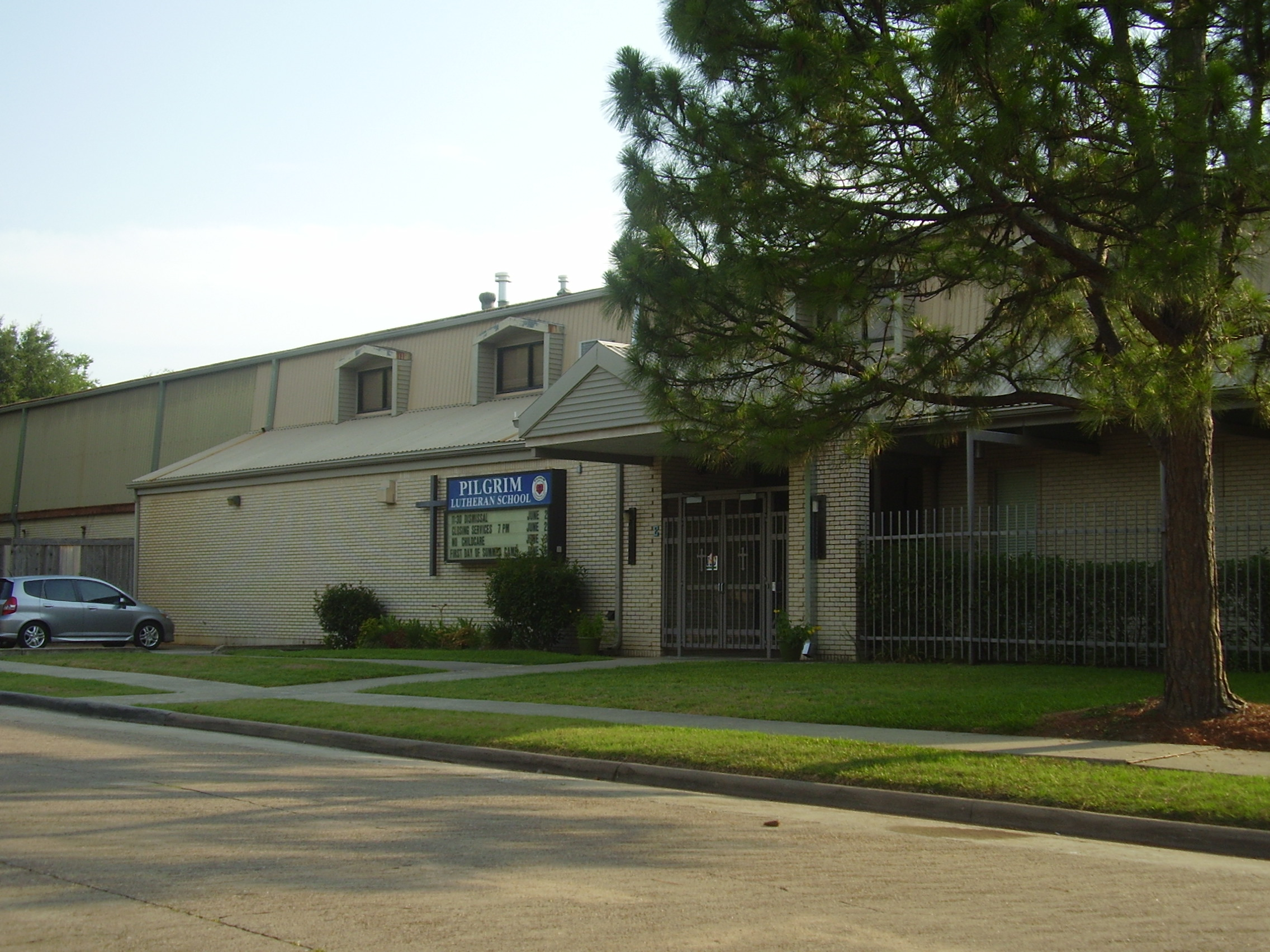
Pilgrim Lutheran School

Highlands Latin School, a private K-12 Christian School, is in Meyerland Section 3. The campus previously housed Pilgrim Lutheran School, a private K-8 Christian School, which later closed its K-8 section and now only has early childhood.

Nearby Catholic schools, under the Roman Catholic Diocese of Galveston-Houston, include St. Vincent de Paul Catholic School (K-8), and Corpus Christi Catholic School. Several other private schools, including St. Thomas' Episcopal School and Beth Yeshurun Day School, are located in the Meyerland area. The Robert M. Beren Academy, Episcopal High School (Bellaire), Westbury Christian School (grades K-12) and Emery/Weiner School are near Meyerland.

During the COVID-19 pandemic in Texas, as of 2022, more students attended Beth Yeshurun Day School and The Shlenker School than previously. An organization called Prizmah stated in a 2021 report that families with a preference for education in a school setting during a pandemic, as opposed to via the internet, often preferred schools that continued offering such.

=== Public libraries ===
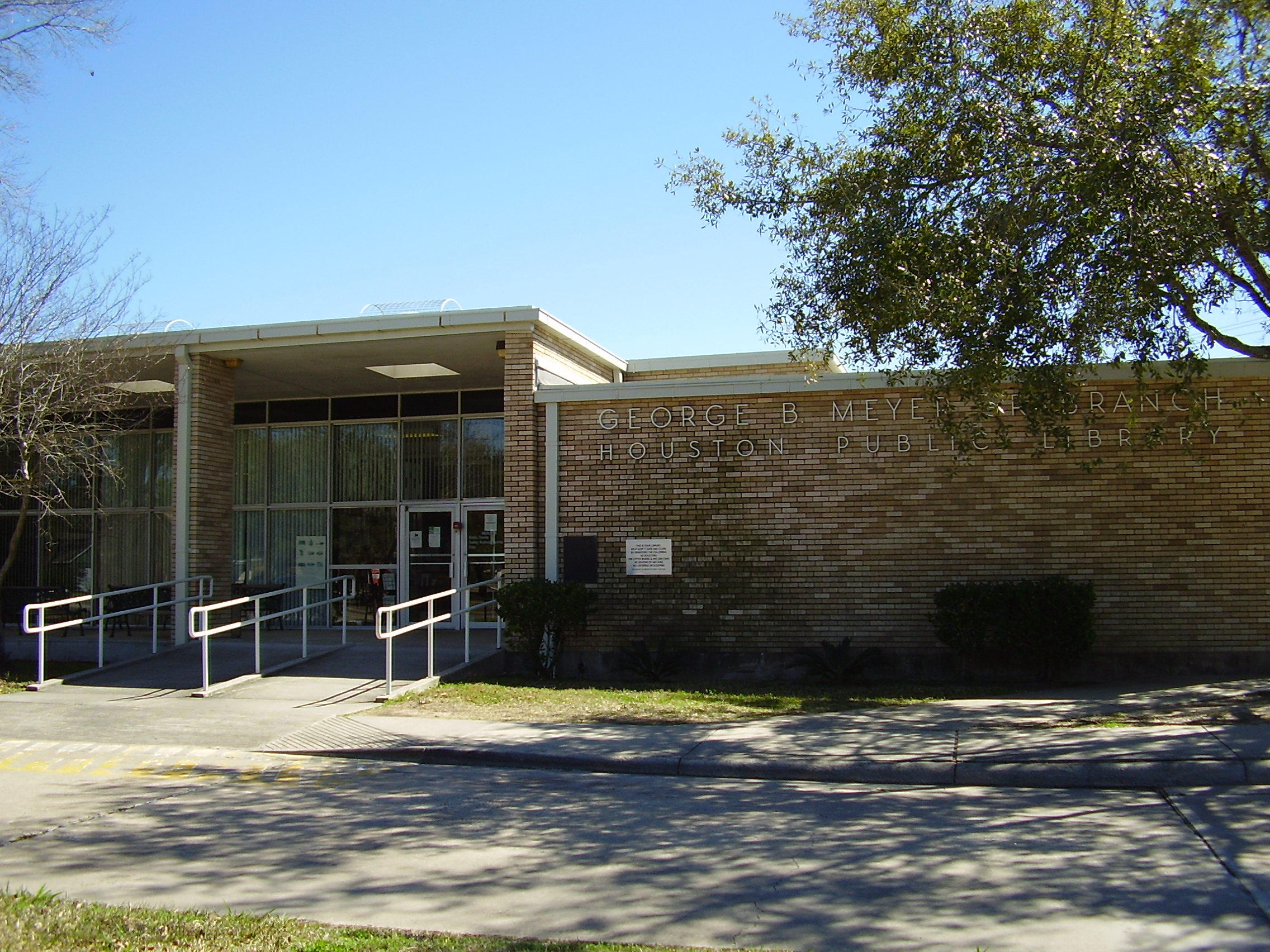
The Meyer Library of the Houston Public Library system

Effective 2023, Dr. Shannon Walker Neighborhood Library of the Houston Public Library (HPL), located in Westbury, is the library location for Meyerland. Its namesake is Shannon Walker.

The HPL formerly operated the George B. Meyer, Sr. Neighborhood Library, which was near Meyerland at 5005 West Bellfort; it opened in 1962. In 1994 the library received renovations to accommodate disabled people. By 2013 HPL planned to purchase land for a new Meyerland branch with $442,000. HPL spokesperson Sandra Fernandez stated that HPL wants to build a new facility in order to increase the size and parking capacity. There is a proposal to move the library to Westbury Square in Westbury, supported by the Westbury community but opposed by Meyerland residents. In 2015 various proposals on where the replacement library should go were being debated. Prior to Hurricane Harvey in 2017, the Houston community considered the Meyer Branch to be the Houston library in the poorest state of maintenance. Hurricane Harvey gave the library moderate damage, and the city government closed it afterwards, with demolition scheduled. The new library, which will also replace HPL Express Frank, will be at 5505 Belrose on a 2.5-acre (1.0 ha) plot of land in Westbury.

== Transportation ==
The Metropolitan Transit Authority of Harris County (METRO) operates public transportation.

Around 1988 METRO proposed having Beechnut Street widened. Residents of Meyerland, Maplewood, and Robindell appeared before the METRO board and protested the plans, stating that they would result in increased traffic. METRO dropped the plans.

== Police service ==
The neighborhood is within the Houston Police Department's Southwest Patrol Division. The homeowners association maintains a contract with Harris County Precinct 5 Constable for improved local security.

== Parks and recreation ==
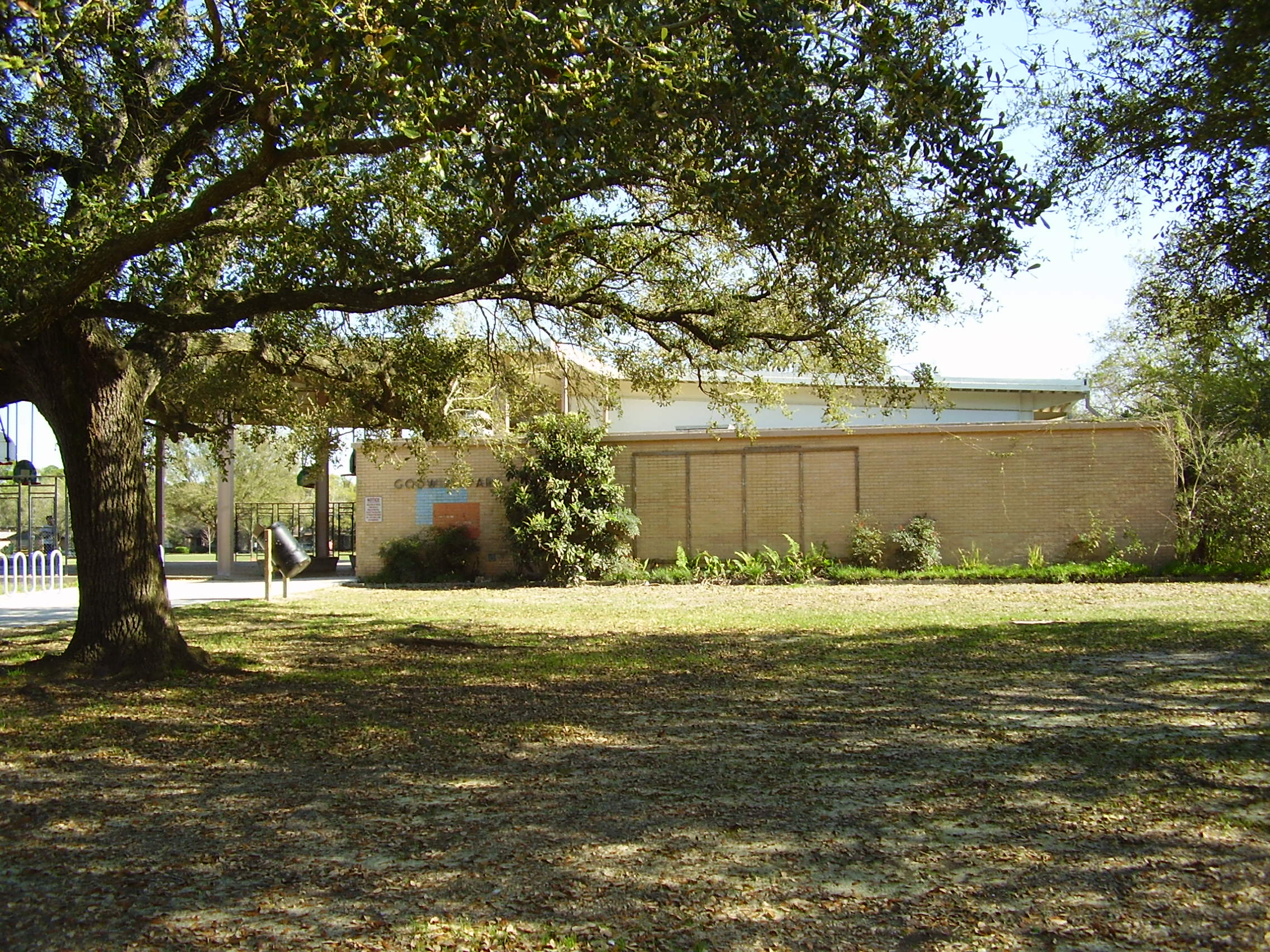
Godwin Park

Two city-operated parks are in Meyerland. Meyerland Park, located at 5151 Jason, is classified as a neighborhood park; it is in Meyerland Section 2.

Herbert Godwin Park, located at 5101 Rutherglen, is classified as a community park. The Godwin Community Center, on the same lot, has an outdoor pavilion, a playground, and a lighted sports field. The sports facilities include a baseball diamond, a soccer field, and a covered basketball court. Godwin Park, adjacent to Kolter Elementary, is about one city block large. Many mothers and children gather at the park on weekends. In 2006, Mimi Swartz of the Texas Monthly said "[t]he grass is shorn and green, the playground equipment freshly painted and sturdy. The park is shaded by benevolent oaks that are about the same age as the homes that surround it[...]"

In the early years of Meyerland's existence, eight garden clubs formed. Little league baseball was first organized in Meyerland in 1957, with games occurring at Meyerland Park. By 1958 the Meyerland Teen Club and the Meyerland Civic Club opened. On May 24, 1958, the Meyerland Club officially opened; families gathered at the club, which hosted a swim team. The club closed in 1996 and was sold to the Jewish Community Center, which redeveloped the facility into the Merfish Teen Center.

The Weekley YMCA in Houston includes Meyerland in its service area. It opened in 1951 as the Southwest YMCA, in West University Place. The current facility in Braeswood Place, Houston broke ground in 2001.

== Media ==
The Houston Chronicle is the area regional newspaper. On Thursdays, residents receive the Bellaire/West U/River Oaks/Meyerland local section.

The Bellaire Examiner is a local newspaper distributed in the community.

The Village News and Southwest News is also published in the community.

The Meyerland Journal is an alternative weekly political paper that covers the Meyerland and Bellaire regions.

The Bellaire Texan, which served the Meyerland area community in the mid-20th Century, was headquartered in Bellaire and published by the Texan Publishing Corporation. By 1975 it became known as the Bellaire & Southwestern Texan and was published by the Preston Publishing Company. It was then headquartered in Houston.

== Notable residents ==
- Chris Bell

== See also ==
- History of the Jews in Houston
