= Westbury Square =

Past Texas shopping centre

Coordinates: 29.657227°N 95.479584°W

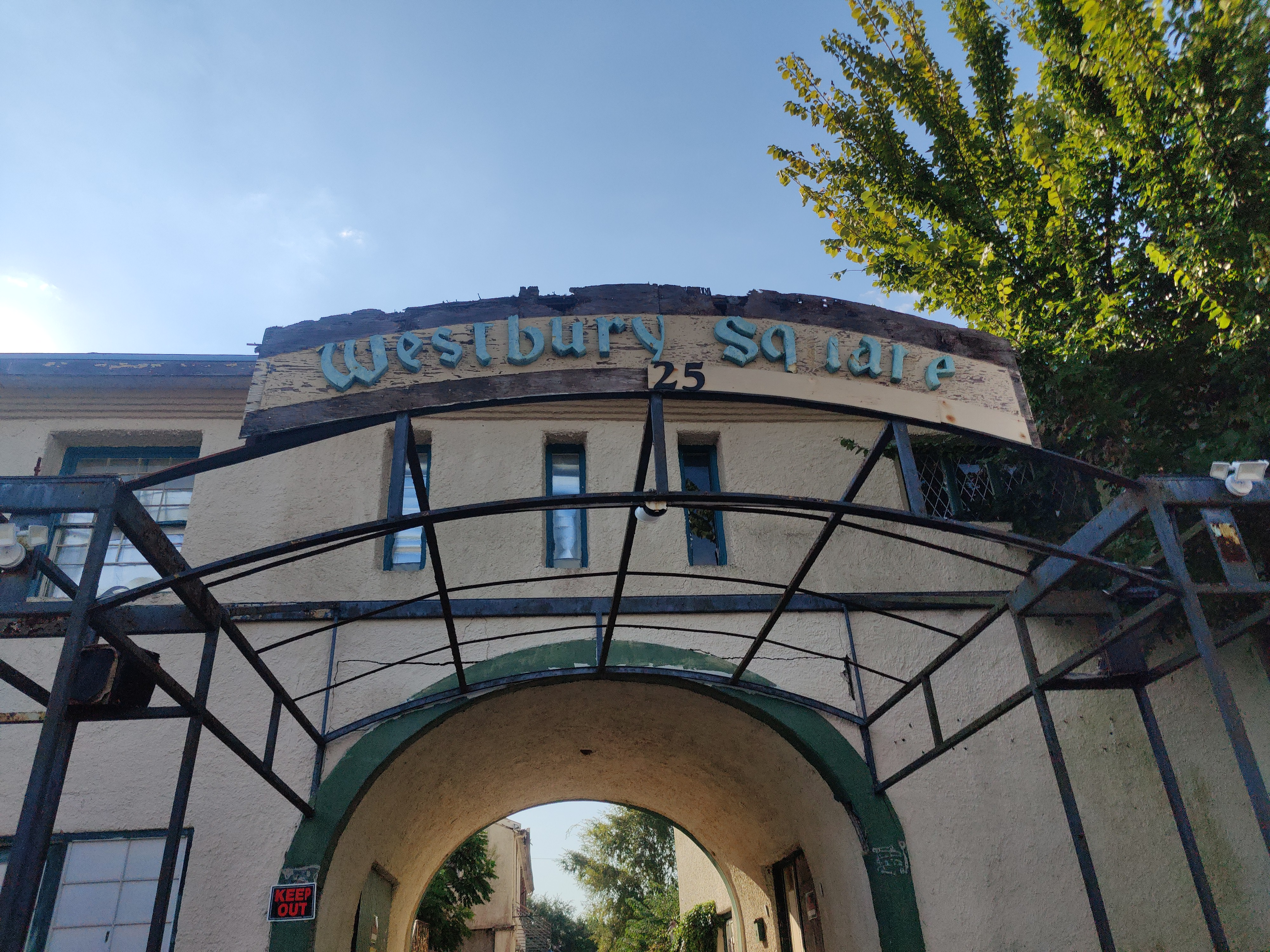
Westbury Square in 2025

Westbury Square was a shopping center located on a 7.5-acre (3.0 ha) site near the intersection of Chimney Rock Road and West Bellfort Avenue, in the Westbury neighborhood in the Brays Oaks district of Southwest Houston, Texas. It was built as a part of Westbury Section 3.

== History ==
=== Design and conception ===
In 1960 Ira Berne, the developer of the Westbury subdivision, had developed the center. The plot of land that would later house Westbury Square was originally undeveloped and a leftover from development of the subdivision; Berne was not sure what should be placed there. Gerry Berne, his wife, said that due to hay fever, Ira Berne had to be out of Houston in the months August through October, so he often vacationed in Italy. While there he became inspired by the architectural design and decided to create a similar atmosphere in a new shopping center in Houston. Berne had traveled to Europe and had a positive view of the European building styles which involved various facades of different time periods and materials next door to one another, and Berne hoped to create a similar atmosphere in his new shopping center.

Berne hired architect William F. Wortham, Jr. to design the complex. Berne traveled to Italy to take photographs and notes so he could model his center after European architectural elements. Alisa Rogillio-Strength of the Houston Business Journal said that Berne's "dream was to recreate a similar environment in Houston in a shopping center where people would come to spend the day, strolling down the brick boulevards, dining at cafes, treating themselves to ice cream and visiting master craftsman in their shops."

=== Opening and rise ===
The center, built in 1962, soon became very popular. Some visitors came as far away as Port Arthur, Texas and Louisiana. Greg Hassell of the Houston Chronicle said "During the 1960s, it could justly be considered the premier shopping destination in the city."

The center included public events such as Christmas choir singing and glass-blowing demonstrations. The glass blowers performed in art festivals held in covered stalls around the fountain on weekends. A "lemon sale" occurred once yearly, where merchandise was sold at discount prices from back-alley booths. Owners of Westbury Square stores and people described by Alisa Rogillio-Strength of the Houston Business Journal as "hip urbanites" occupied the apartments. During the successful era, many apartment complexes of a similar style were being built around and near Westbury Square.

Gray said "To car-dependent Houstonians, its pedestrian world seemed as dreamlike as its evocation of Italy: Surely this city couldn't offer a pretty place to walk, or for kids to ride their bikes." Gray added that the public events "[h]eighten[ed] the sense of altered reality". Barry Moore, an architect who writes for Cite magazine, described Westbury Square as a "retail Brigadoon" and said that it "was as if Disneyland's Main Street USA had been translated into a real place where people could buy real stuff, and then go home to an apartment on the second floor." Its buildings were once used in a production of A Streetcar Named Desire.

=== Decline ===
After the opening of The Galleria in November 1970, Westbury Square began to decline. The opening of the Galleria caused tenants to move there from smaller shopping centers in suburban areas, such as Westbury Square. Allison Rogillio-Strength of the Houston Business Journal said " As the glitz of new indoor shopping palaces lured shoppers by the thousands, the Westbury Square property began to see less traffic." Lisa Gray of the Houston Chronicle said "candle-making demonstrations couldn't compete against" the Galleria's ice skating rink. Around that time, various hippies began socializing at Westbury Square's Piazza. Addison McElroy, an owner of three Westbury Square shops quoted in the Houston Business Journal, said "[t]hey would yell back and forth and the ladies just didn't want to be around that." Greg Hassell of the Houston Chronicle said that the center was not easy for native Houstonians or non-locals to find, and that the center did not have major anchor tenants. Hassell added that "[t]he Westbury area also entered a time of flux, as portions of the neighborhood declined". However Hassell stated that Westbury Square "had style, enough so to inspire loyalty even when its best days were behind it."

Gray added that the 1980s oil bust "nearly finished off" Westbury Square. Gray added that "[t]he mall never recovered". In 1988 the original owner of Westbury Square went into Chapter 11 bankruptcy protection. Afterwards, McDonnell-Douglas Financial Corp. owned Westbury Square. It was later owned by Alfred Antonini, a landlord. In 1995 Ralph Bivins of the Houston Chronicle said "[o]nly a handful of stores remain open" in Westbury Square. During that year Home Depot made an offer to buy the center to build a new store, with the possibility that portions of the center may be demolished. The Home Depot Westbury Square #578 hardware store is now located on a portion of what was Westbury Square. The circular plaza and fountain were destroyed so the store could be built. 60% of the original Westbury Square remained. Alfred Antonini continued to own the remainder of Westbury Square.

In 2002 Alisa Rogillio-Strength said that the center was "a much bedraggled specter of its former self" and that "Residents in the area are hopeful that Westbury Square will undergo a transformation similar to that of Meyerland Plaza." As of that year, the property manager, Roy Zirpoli, and the remaining tenants established the Westbury Square Merchants Association (WSMA) and started efforts to preserve Westbury Square. At the time, there were plans to open a farmer's market which would include 100 stands of local produce and classes on subjects such as gardening for children and marketing of one's own produce. Rogillio-Strength said that there was a possibility for the center to redevelop due to the addition of suburbs to the south including Silverlake and Savannah, the increase in property values in nearby Bellaire and Meyerland, the renovation of Main Street, the expansion in the Texas Medical Center, and the construction of Reliant Stadium.

In 2007 Mike McGuff, then of KTRK-TV, said "There has been talk of a revival for the small part left standing but we'll have to wait and see if that ever becomes reality."

In September 2010 the owner of the remaining buildings put them up for sale. Gary Loh, one of the two brokers who put Westbury Square for sale, stated that while there was sentimental value, but he expected the buyer to destroy the buildings. In September 2012 Gray said "These days, the rickety remaining buildings look more like an Old West ghost town than an Italian village" and that the area residents "hope that it'll be razed soon."

On February 6, 2014, buildings 1 and 5 were removed under an agreement with the City of Houston after a longstanding battle over a “repair or demolish” order.

On July 2, 2015, it was announced that the remaining buildings will be demolished and the site used for a gated community of approximately 110 homes.

== Design ==
As of 1996 the center had 139,000 square feet (12,900 m^{2}) of space. As of 2010 the center has 326,630 square feet (30,345 m^{2}) of space. The design, made by architect William J. Wortham, Jr., was centered on a circular piazza and fountain lined with street lamps designed from a sketch Berne made while he was in Europe. The center had a tall clock tower. The center also included apartments and offices on the second floors of the buildings, while shops occupied the first floor. Lisa Gray of the Houston Chronicle said that the resulting design was "a walkable, two-story place full of plazas, brick walkways, fountains and antique street lights - all the scaled-down trappings of an imaginary Italian past, there in the Space Age, moon shot-proud city of the future." Rogillio-Strength described the building style as "a 19th Century, Italian villa style" which "marked an unusual break from the commercial architectural trend of the time." The Houston Architectural Guide said that the design "centered on a circular plaza from which irregular pedestrian alleyways radiate."

Lisa Gray of the Houston Chronicle said that "Urban-design nerds often say that mixed-use, walkable Westbury Square was 50 years ahead of its time." Mike McGuff of KIAH said "The square was ahead of its time and could be compared to Uptown Park or the shopping plazas in The Woodlands, Sugar Land or Pearland."

== Tenants ==
The shops occupying spaces at Westbury square during the center's height in the 1960s and 1970s included The Candle Shop; Cargo Houston Importers, a store described by Alisa Rogillio-Strength of the Houston Business Journal as "a predecessor to Pier 1"; The Chemist Shop, a perfume store; Cromwell's, self-described as an "Olde English Gentleman's clothing store"; The Gallery, a store selling gifts and fine china; The Gay Dot, a store selling cards and stationery; Gifts 'n Gab; Flowers Inc., a florist; Holland House, a shop selling imports originating from the Netherlands; the Jewel Chest; Rumpleheimer's, an ice cream parlor; Turrentine's Needlecraft; several dress shops, Village Inn Pizza Parlor, Joan Flake, a children's clothing and gifts boutique, and other shops. Rogillo-Strength said that the store names are, as of 2002, "familiar to many long-time Houston residents". Individuals named Preston John Frazier Jr. and Claude Addison McElroy owned The Candle Shop, Cargo and The Chemist Shop. When McElroy found that the center was declining, he decided to sell his shops. Tuesday Morning opened in place of the Cargo Houston store and Wicks 'N' Sticks opened in place of The Candle Shop. Rogillio-Strength said "[b]oth managed to do decent business for a few more years."

There were also Electric Paisley Arts and Crafts, a head shop; Sound Shoppe, a record store; Mario's, an Italian restaurant; Smuggler's Chest, a jewelry store, specializing in costume jewelry; several dress shops, and other retail establishments. There was also a preschool and elementary private school called The Little Red School House.

In 1995 tenants included several shops, a school, and a Houston Police Department storefront station; during that year Ralph Bivins said that "[o]nly a handful of stores remain open" In 2002, no name brand tenants occupied any spaces at Westbury Square.

In 2002 several antique shops moved into Westbury Square. As of October 2002, four antique shops were located in Westbury Square, and several businesses described by Rogillio-Strength as "shoestring businesses," including the psychic shop "Psychic Readings," were present in some townhouses across from Westbury Square. In the northern hemisphere fall of that year, some businesses scheduled to open in Westbury square included a 24-hour daycare for children of the ages zero through four; Caravanserai, a non-profit arts education gallery; and "Ribs & Thangs," a barbecue restaurant that offered takeout service. In December of that year, businesses scheduled to open included an additional antique shop, a florist, and a shop selling jewelry and imports from Mexico. In 2010 Dorit Golan, an employee of the Keller Williams subsidiary KW Commercial, said that very few tenants were left in Westbury Square.

== Legacy ==
Greg Hassell of the Houston Chronicle said "Westbury Square wasn't his only accomplishment, and it certainly wasn't his most profitable." Gerry Berne said "building Westbury Square was the most creative thing he was ever involved in. It was personal. It was a romantic thing for him." In 1999 Hassell said "many newcomers to Houston are unaware that it's even there" but that "the very mention of Westbury Square is enough to elicit a smile from longtime Houstonians." According to Gray, as of 2012, Westbury Square "provokes fits of nostalgia in old-time Houstonians."

"...Westbury Square, once the hippest shopping center in Houston. (They had a Santa with a real beard and a tie-dyed suit)..."

== Sources ==
- Rogillio-Strength, Alisa. "Merchants on mission to revive Westbury Square." Houston Business Journal. October 27, 2002.
