= Dr. Shannon Walker Library =

Library building in Westbury, Houston, Texas

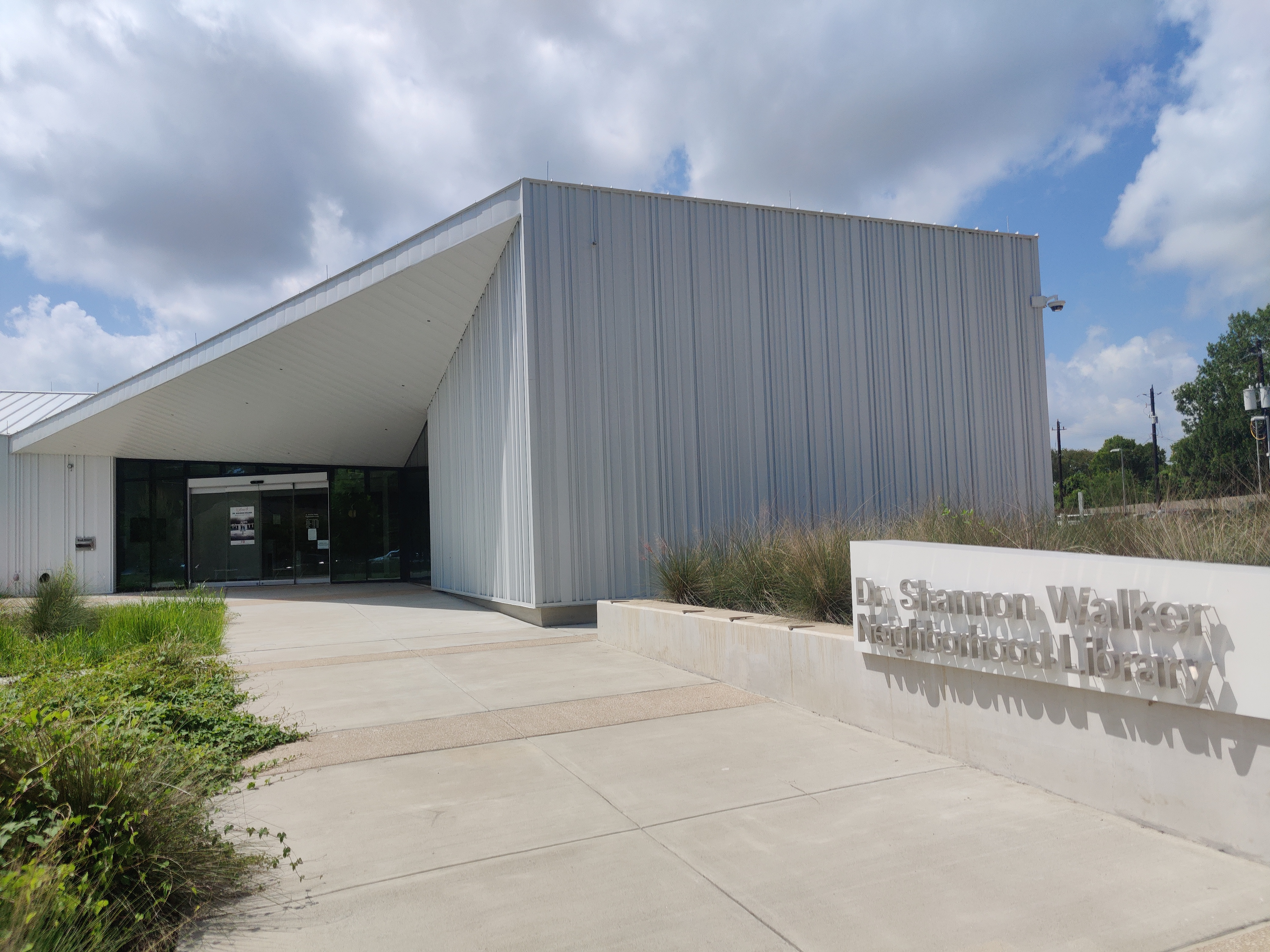
- Picture from the front of the library
- 29.6534°N 95.4821°W
- Location: 5505 Belrose, Houston, Texas, United States, 77035
- Established: June 1, 2024
- Architect: Brave Architecture
- Service area: Westbury, Meyerland, Brays Oaks and Hiram Clarke
- Branch of: Houston Public Library

Other information
- Administrative Supervisor: Derrick Chigabatia

The Dr. Shannon Walker Neighborhood Library is a branch of the Houston Public Library named after scientist and astronaut Shannon Walker. It opened on June 1, 2024. The library is 23,000 square feet (2,100 m^{2}) and replaced the Frank HPL Express Library and the Meyer Library.
