= Westbury, Houston =

Neighborhood in Houston, Texas, United States

Coordinates: 29.6506°N 95.4897°W

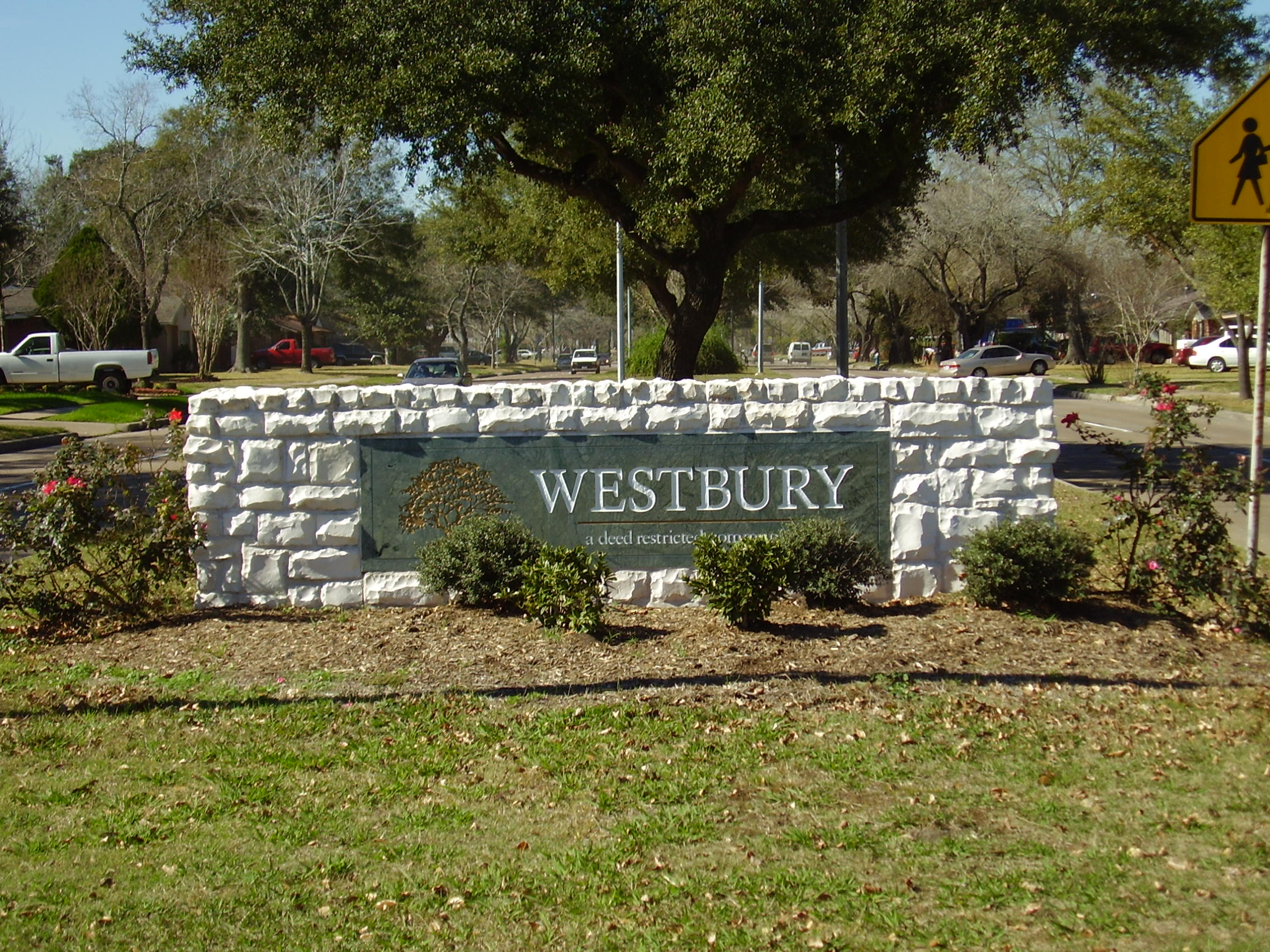
A sign indicating the Westbury neighborhood

Westbury is a neighborhood in the Brays Oaks district of Southwest Houston, Texas, United States. It is located east of Bob White Road, north of U.S. Highway 90 Alternate (South Main Street), and west of South Post Oak Road, adjacent to the Fondren Southwest and Meyerland neighborhoods, just west of the southwest corner of the 610 Loop.

Westbury was named as the 2007 "Best Hidden Neighborhood" by the Houston Press . Westbury was also listed in the 25 Hottest Houston Neighborhoods in the June 2013 edition of Houstonia Magazine. .

Areas served by the Westbury Civic Club include Westbury 1-5, Parkwest 1-3, and Westbury South.

== History ==
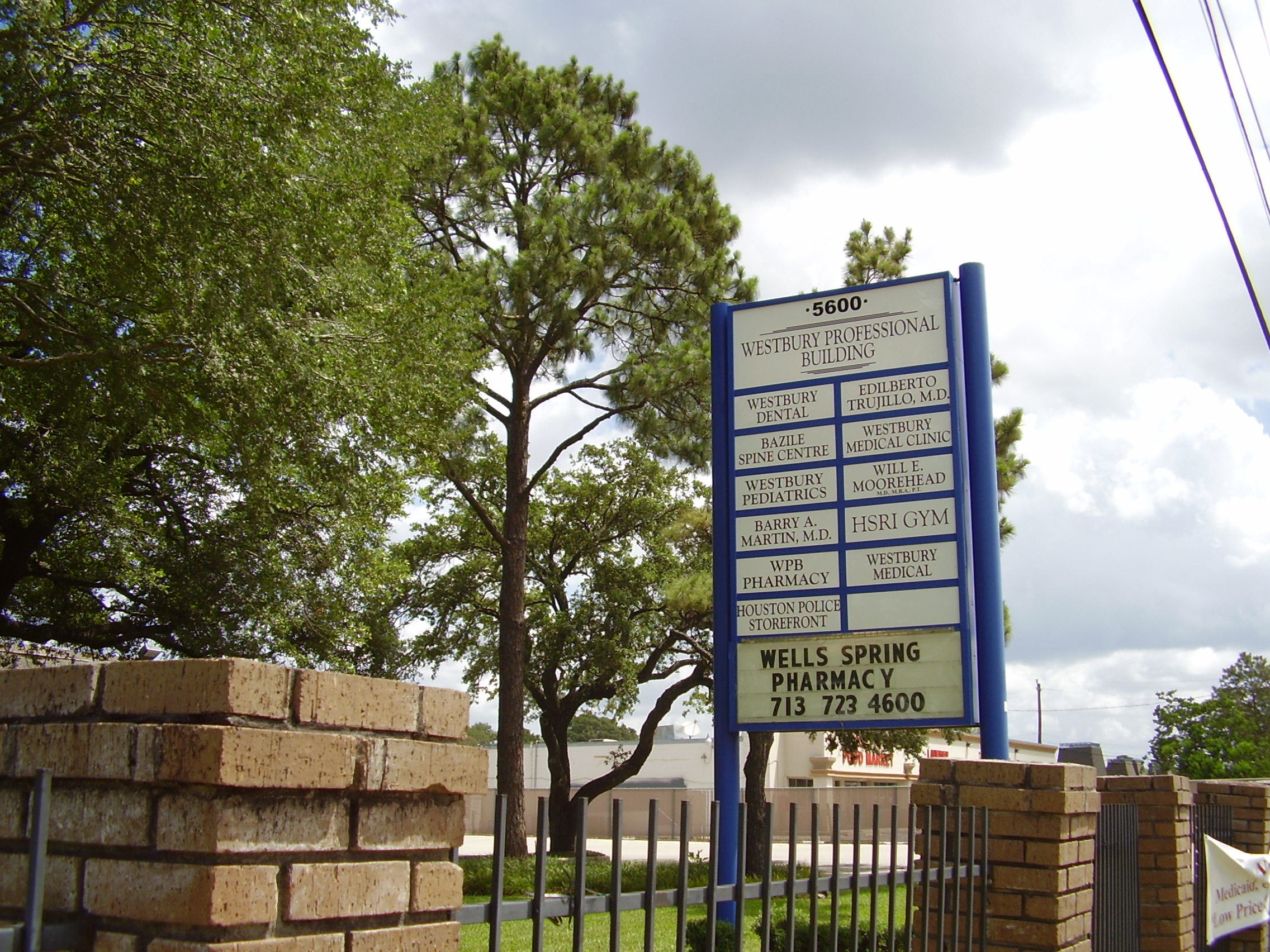
Westbury Professional Building, which includes the Houston Police Department Westbury Storefront

Westbury was developed in the 1950s and 1960s by Ira Berne as part of the post–World War II migration to the suburbs. The developer had moved from Westbury, New York, after which he named the new community. Around 1953 the area known as Sam Houston Airport ended its flight operations where the airport property was redeveloped.

In 1960 Berne had developed the Westbury Square shopping center.

In the 1980s the City of Houston Housing Authority proposed a 105-unit public housing project in the Westbury area. Thousands of residents entered public hearings to protest the concept, so the city did not build any public housing in the Westbury area.

Around the 1980s markets crashed and many of Westbury's businesses either closed or became abandoned. Crime increased at this time, but has decreased greatly in recent years. As real estate has become more expensive in gentrified areas such as Houston Heights and Neartown, Westbury has become an attractive place to live for some of Houston's gay and lesbian population. Gays and lesbians began moving to Westbury in the 2000s, and some were referring to it as "Little Montrose".

In April 2010 the City of Houston "automated" curbside recycling program was extended to Westbury East.

In 2011 the Brays Oaks district expanded. Westbury, which was originally not a part of the Brays Oaks district, became a part of it.

== Sections ==
Areas served by the Westbury Civic Club include Westbury 1-5, Parkwest 1-3, and Westbury South.

== Demographics ==
In 2015 the City of Houston-defined Westbury Super Neighborhood had 20,693 people. 39% were Hispanics, 19% were non-Hispanic blacks, 35% were non-Hispanic whites, 5% were non-Hispanic Asians, and 2% were non-Hispanic others. In 2000 the super neighborhood had 22,090 people. 37% were non-Hispanic whites, 34% were Hispanics, 22% were non-Hispanic blacks, 7% were non-Hispanic Asians, and 1% were non-Hispanic other.

== Government and infrastructure ==
=== Local government ===
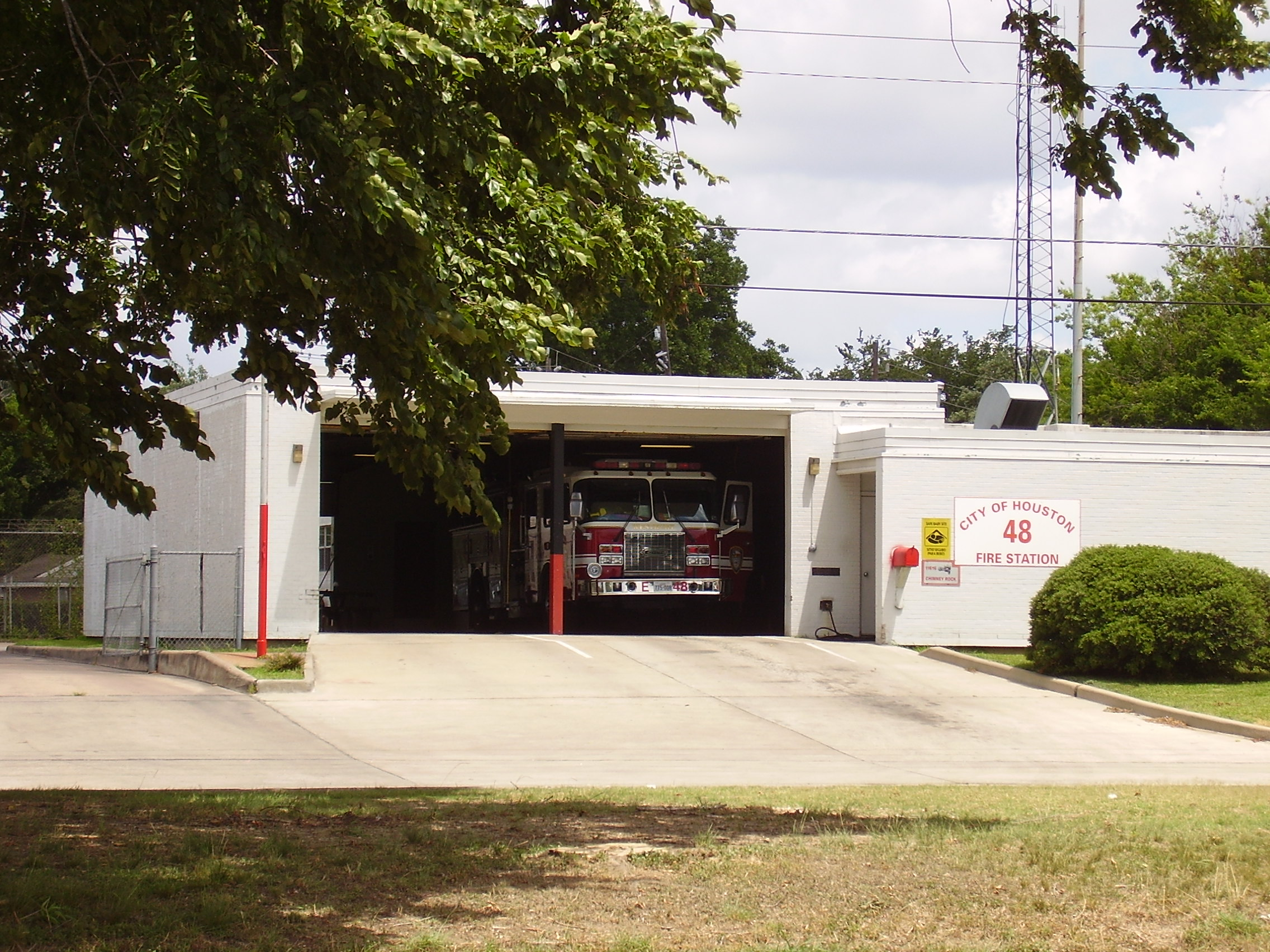
Fire Station 48 Westbury

The Westbury Civic Club has its headquarters in Suite 107 at 5322 W. Bellfort. In 2021 there were accusations that the organization, which is a civic club and not a homeowner's association, was sending bills for fees and describing them as mandatory; as the former it is not supposed to describe fees as mandatory while the latter can.

The neighborhood is within the Houston Police Department's Southwest Patrol Division . The Westbury HPD Storefront Station was formerly located at 5550 Gasmer.

Houston Fire Department Fire Station 48 Westbury, located in Fire District 59, serves the neighborhood. Station 48 relocated to its current location in 1961 and was last renovated during the financial year of 1998. Station 48 is in Section 3.

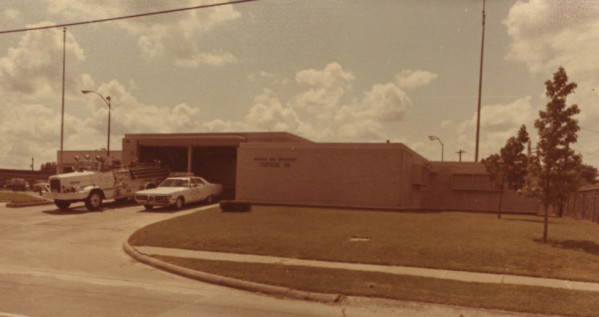
Fire Station 48, 1976

Westbury is now a part of Houston City Council District K, currently represented by Council Member Martha Castex-Tatum (replacing the late Larry Green), while a small number of about 100 homes remain in District C, currently represented by Council Member Ellen Cohen (as of 2012). The area was previously served by Houston City Councilmember District C (Anne Clutterbuck as of 2009).

=== County, federal, and state representation ===
The area is split between Texas's 9th congressional district (Al Green as of 2012) and Texas's 7th congressional district (Lizzie Fletcher as of 2021). It is in Harris County Commissioner Precinct One, represented by Commissioner Rodney Ellis as well as Harris County Constable Precinct Five, represented by Ted Heap.

Harris Health System (formerly Harris County Hospital District) designated Valbona Health Center (formerly People's Health Center) in Greater Sharpstown for ZIP codes 77035 and 77096. The nearest public hospital is Ben Taub General Hospital in the Texas Medical Center.

== Parks and recreation ==
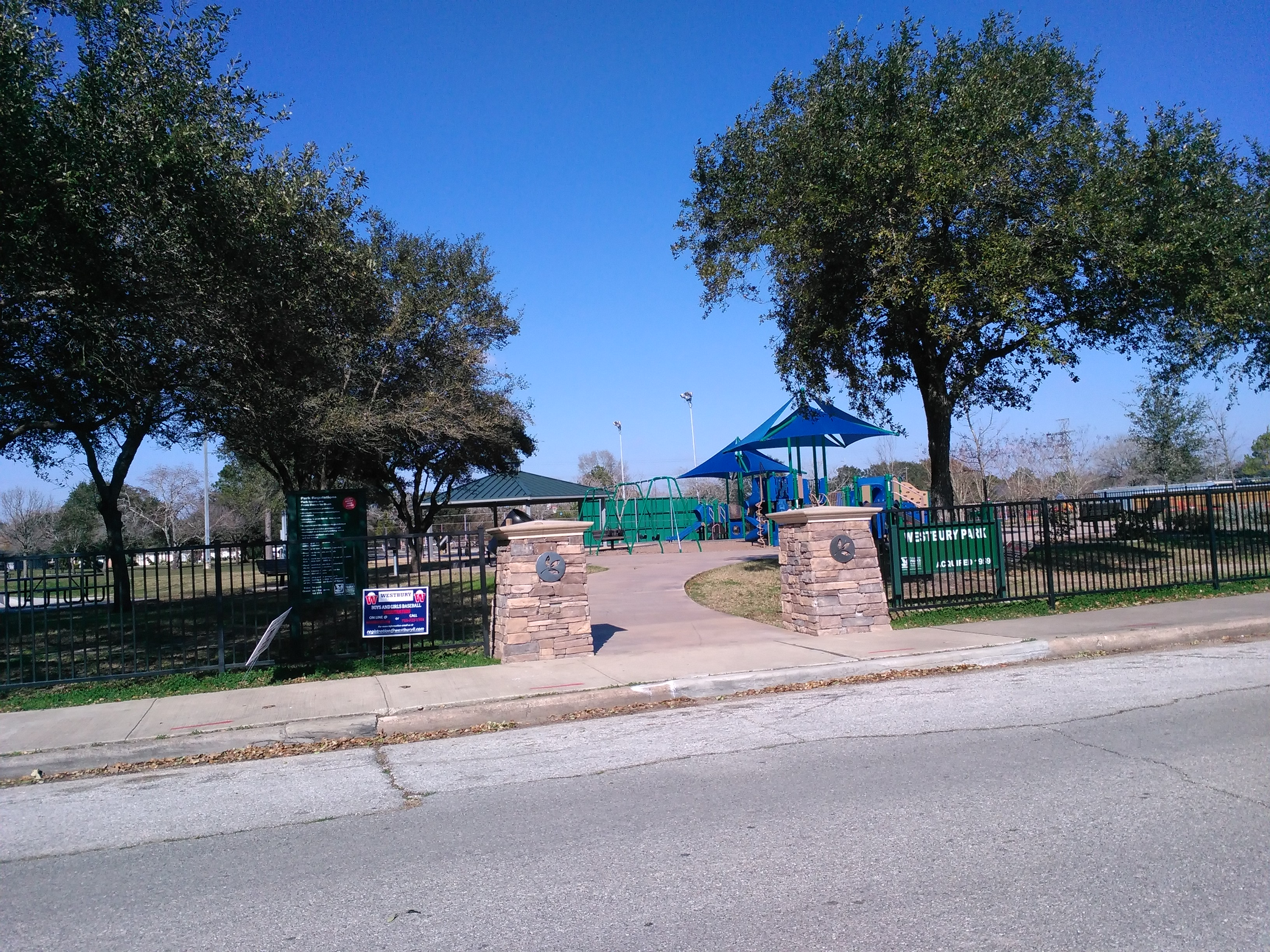
Westbury Park

The city of Houston operates Westbury Park at 5635 Willowbend () which features the Westbury Pool (street address is 10605 Mullins), a playground, tennis courts, and a multi-sport playing field. . Westbury Park is located in Parkwest Section 1.

In addition, the city operates the Leiv & Betty Platou Community Center located in Chimney Rock Park. Chimney Rock Park has a playground, tennis courts, and basketball courts. Chimney Rock Park and Platou Community Center are in Westbury Section 3.

Lee Hager Park is in Westbury Section 4. The park, with its covered basketball court, is located next to the Anderson Elementary School between Landsdowne Drive and McClearen Dr, and attracts many in the neighborhood for outdoor sports.() Hager Park also features a walking trail, a multi-purpose sports field, and has a shared playground with Anderson Elementary School.

The Willow Waterhole Greenspace Conservancy Reserve is located in Westbury behind the Westbury High School. This 290-acre park includes a pavilion, walking trails, and waterways with abundant local and migrating bird species. The Conservancy hosts community events at the park, including an annual music festival, annual fishing events, and periodic family fun days with activities and movies for children. The park is the recipient of a Houston Arts Alliance grant to support the annual MusicFest and a grant from the Mortimer & Mimi Levitt Foundation to build a performing arts pavilion that is scheduled to open in 2020.

== Community information ==
The closest YMCA is the West Orem YMCA Branch. The old Westland YMCA was acquired by the Westbury Christian Church to expand its successful athletic program and hosts numerous soccer tournaments on adjacent fields.

The Westbury Civic Club is the area civic club. The Community Association Institute, along with Randall's, gave it the "1992 Civic Club Community of the Year Award" at the Adam's Mark hotel in Westchase.

The neighborhood has a baseball little league called Westbury Little League. It won the Little League World Series in 1966.

The closest Emergency Room and hospital is called Westbury Community Hospital located near the high school on Gasmer drive.

The United States Postal Service operates the Westbury Post Office at 11805 Chimney Rock Road.

== Education ==
=== Primary and secondary schools ===
==== Public schools ====
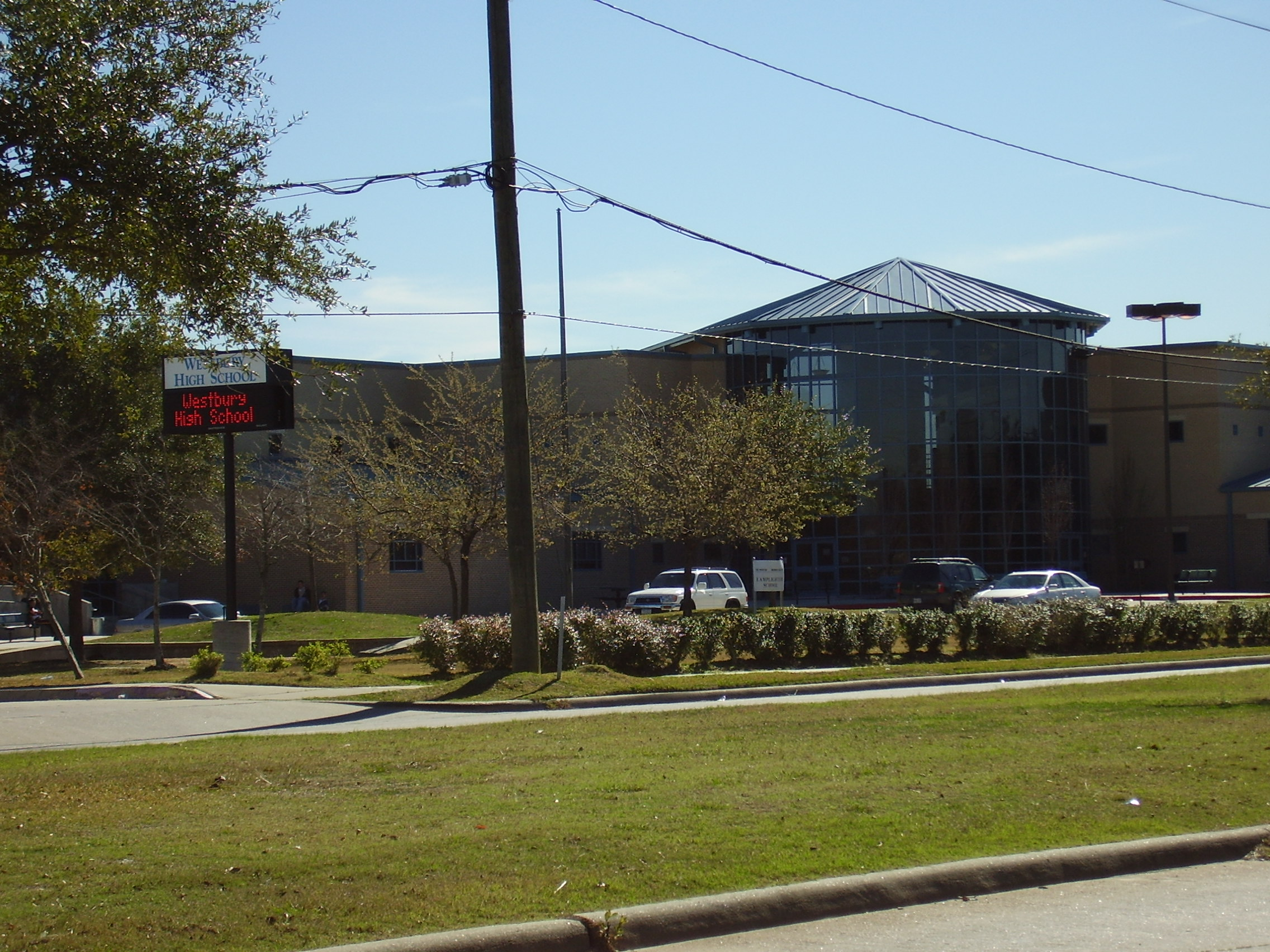
Westbury High School serves most of Westbury

The neighborhood is served by the Houston Independent School District.

The neighborhood is divided between the following attendance zones for elementary school:

- Cynthia Ann Parker Elementary School - In Parkwest Section 1
- Anderson Elementary School - In Westbury Section 4
- Kolter Elementary School in Meyerland
- Tinsley Elementary School

The neighborhood is divided between the following attendance zoned for middle school:

- Meyerland Performing and Visual Arts Middle School (formerly Johnston Middle School)
- Fondren Middle School

Anyone zoned to Johnston may apply to Pin Oak Middle School's regular program.

Westbury High School serves almost all of Westbury. A sliver of Westbury is zoned to Bellaire High School.

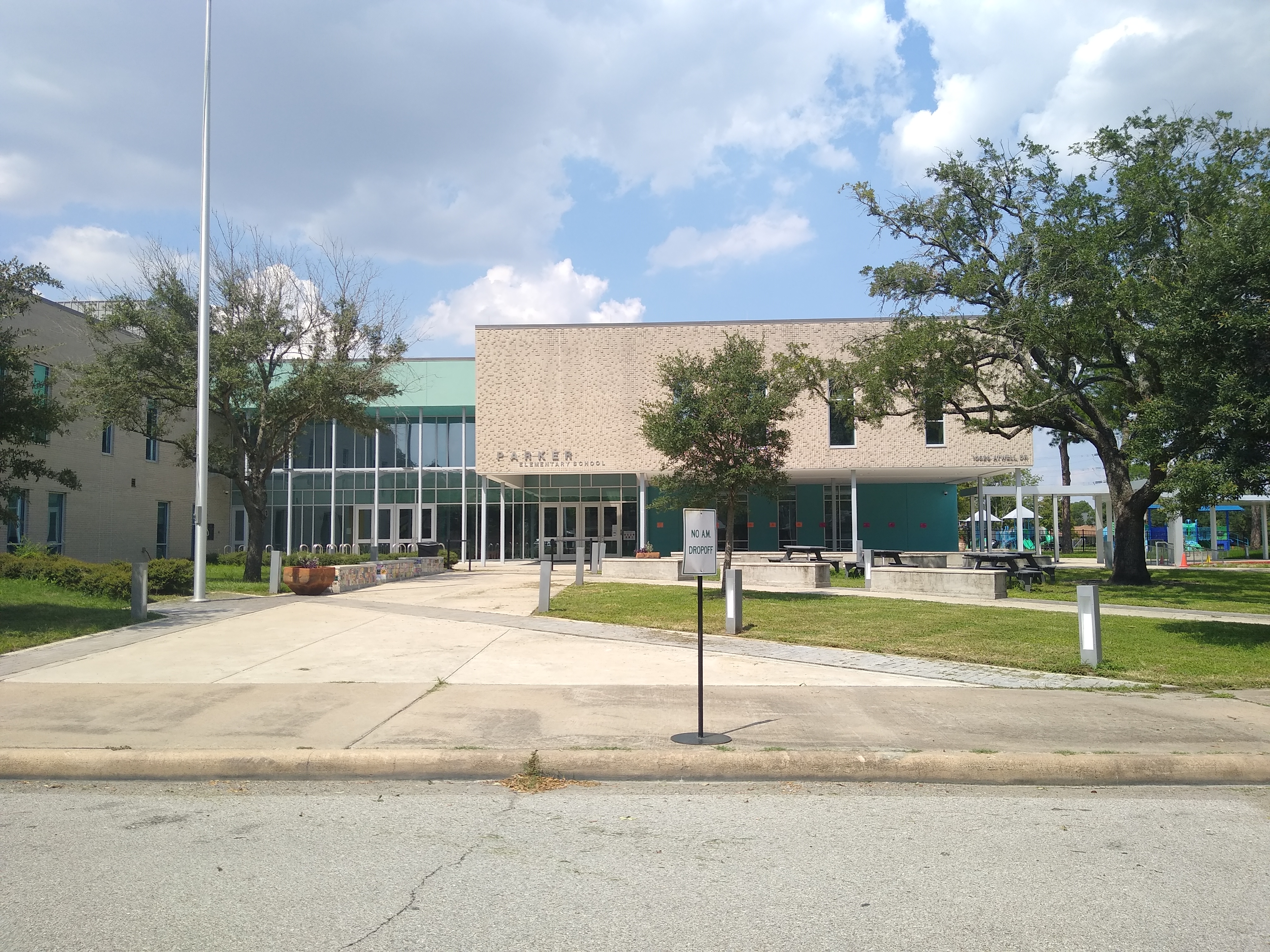
Parker Elementary School serves much of northern Westbury

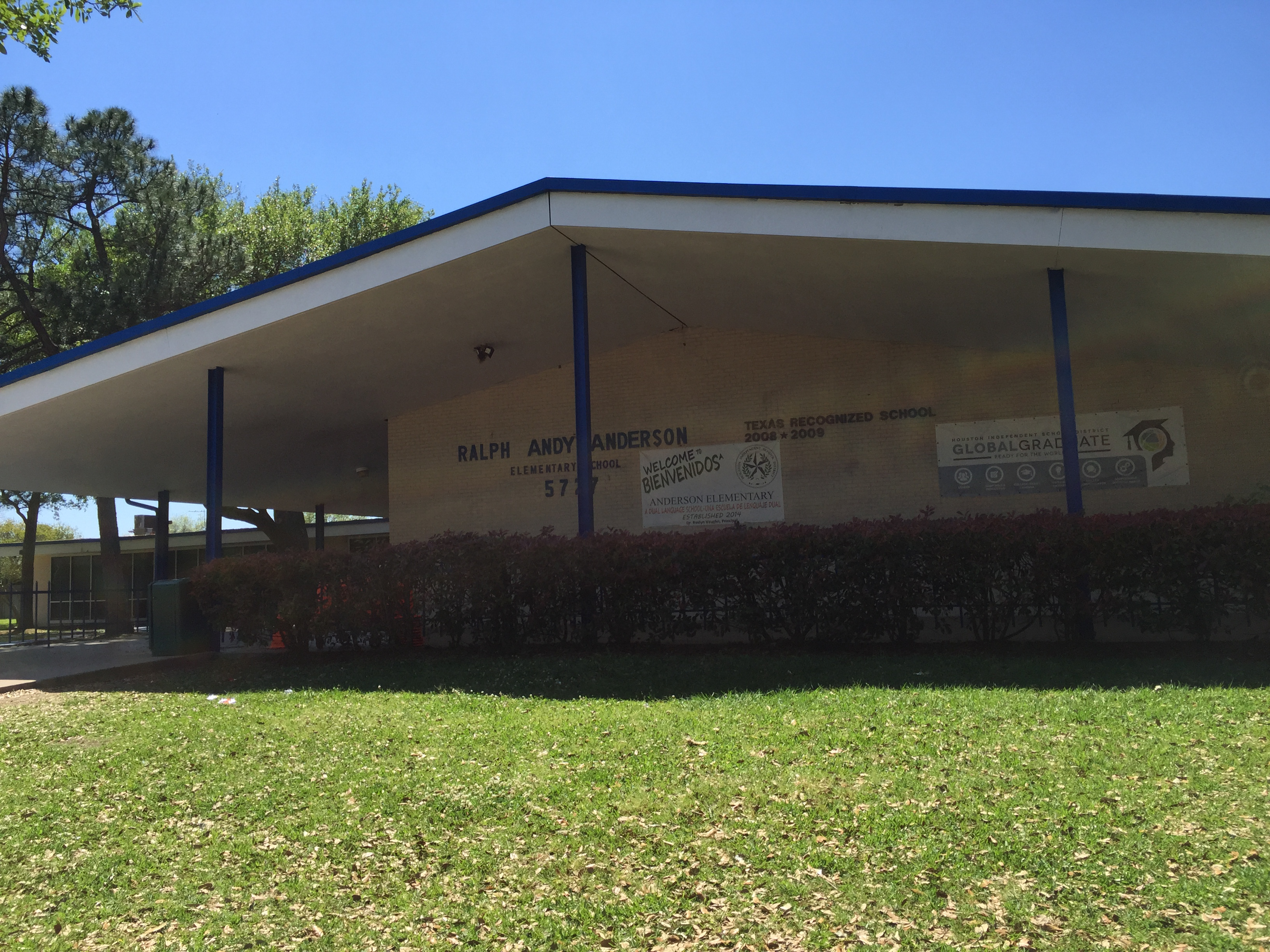
Anderson Elementary School serves much of southern Westbury

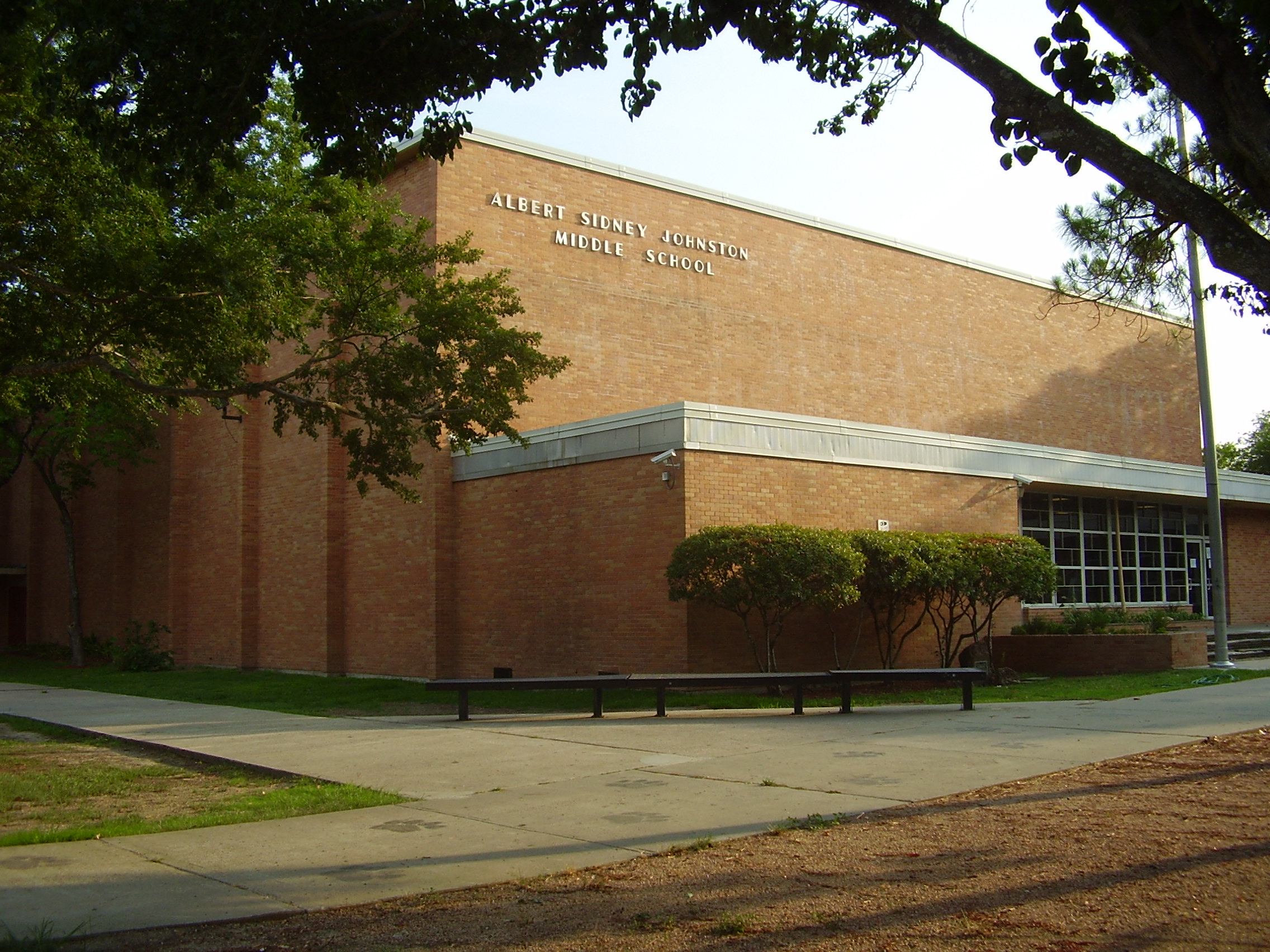
Meyerland Middle School (formerly Johnston Middle) in Meyerland serves most of Westbury

===== History of public schools =====
Parker Elementary opened in 1959, and Johnston Middle School opened in its current location in 1959. Anderson and Kolter opened in 1960. Westbury High School opened in 1961. Fondren Middle opened in 1966.

Anderson, initially with a capacity of 600, had it increase to 900 as a new wing opened in 1963. In the late 1990s Anderson Elementary was overcrowded due to increasing student populations in Westbury area apartment complexes. In 1996 there were 1,500 students; an additional 300 had been reassigned to other schools. In 1998 the school had almost 1,600 students. Around that time hundreds of students who were zoned to Anderson were bussed to relief campuses.

Tinsley opened in 2002, relieving Anderson and another area school.

As of 2006 many middle and upper class residents of the Westbury attendance zone would not send their children to Westbury; usually they send their children to Bellaire High School, Lamar High School, or private schools.

Medical Center Charter School, a pre-kindergarten through 5th grade charter school, was located in the Westbury area. Despite its name, the school is not located in the Texas Medical Center area. Medical Center Charter School opened in 1996, and catered to employees working in the Medical Center and had the Montessori method, used until grade two. Its specialty as of 2003 was foreign languages. In 2014, the Texas Education Agency (TEA) announced that the school's performance was insufficient and that it sought to revoke its charter. By 2018, its charter had closed.

==== Private schools ====
St. Thomas More School (K-8 , operated by the Archdiocese of Galveston-Houston), a neighborhood Roman Catholic school in Maplewood South Section 6.

The neighborhood has or has in close proximity several other private schools, such as Westbury Christian School (K–12) and St. Nicholas School Southwest Campus (K-8).

Trafton Academy and Miss Porter's School located in the Willowbend area also serves Westbury residents.

=== Public libraries ===
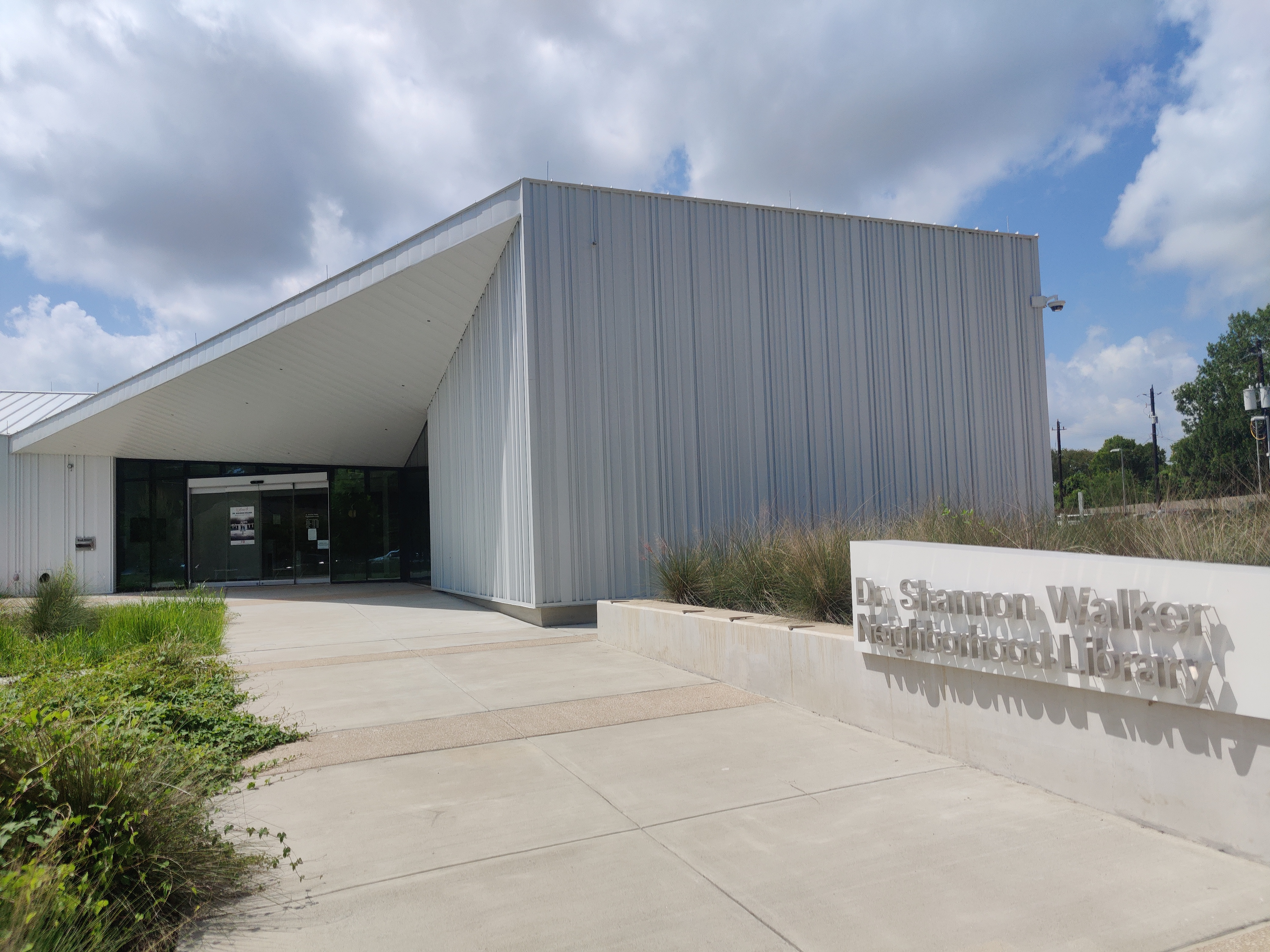
Dr. Shannon Walker Neighborhood Library

Dr. Shannon Walker Neighborhood Library of the Houston Public Library (HPL) is the library location for Westbury. Its namesake is Shannon Walker.

The Meyer Library in Meyerland opened in 1962. In 1994 the library received renovations to accommodate disabled people. By 2013 HPL planned to purchase land for a new Meyerland branch with $442,000. HPL spokesperson Sandra Fernandez stated that HPL wants to build a new facility in order to increase the size and parking capacity. There was a proposal to move the library to Westbury Square, supported by the Westbury community but opposed by Meyerland residents. In 2015 various proposals on where the replacement library should go were being debated. Prior to Hurricane Harvey in 2017, the Houston community considered the Meyer Branch to be the Houston library in the poorest state of maintenance. Hurricane Harvey gave the library moderate damage, and the city government closed it afterwards, with demolition scheduled. The new library, which also replaced HPL Express Frank, was to be built at 5505 Belrose on a 2.5-acre (1.0 ha) plot of land, in Westbury Section 3.

== Media ==
The Houston Chronicle is the area regional newspaper. On Thursdays, residents receive the Bellaire/West U/River Oaks/Meyerland local section.

The Bellaire Texan, which served the Westbury area community in the mid-20th Century, was headquartered in Bellaire and published by the Texan Publishing Corporation. By 1975 it became known as the Bellaire & Southwestern Texan and was published by the Preston Publishing Company. It was then headquartered in Houston.

== Notable residents ==
- Carol Vance (former Harris County district attorney)
