= Shannon Walker =

American scientist and NASA astronaut (born 1965)

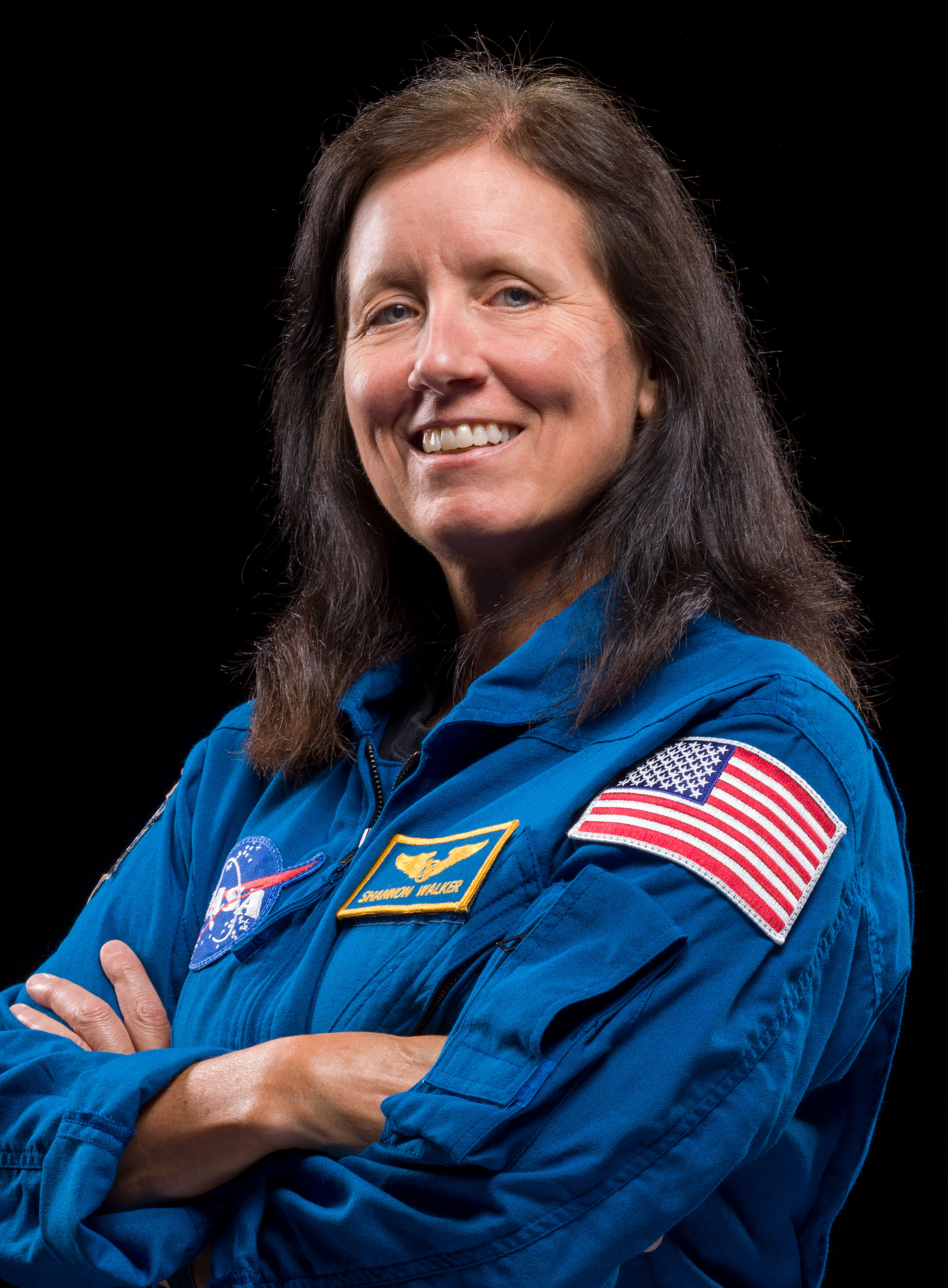
- Walker in 2020
- Born: June 4, 1965 (age 61); Houston, Texas, U.S.
- Education: Rice University (BS, MS, PhD)
- Spouse: Andy Thomas
- Space career

NASA astronaut
- Time in space: 330d 13h 40m
- Selection: NASA Group 19 (2004)
- Mission: Soyuz TMA-19 (Expedition 24/25); SpaceX Crew-1 (Expedition 64/65)
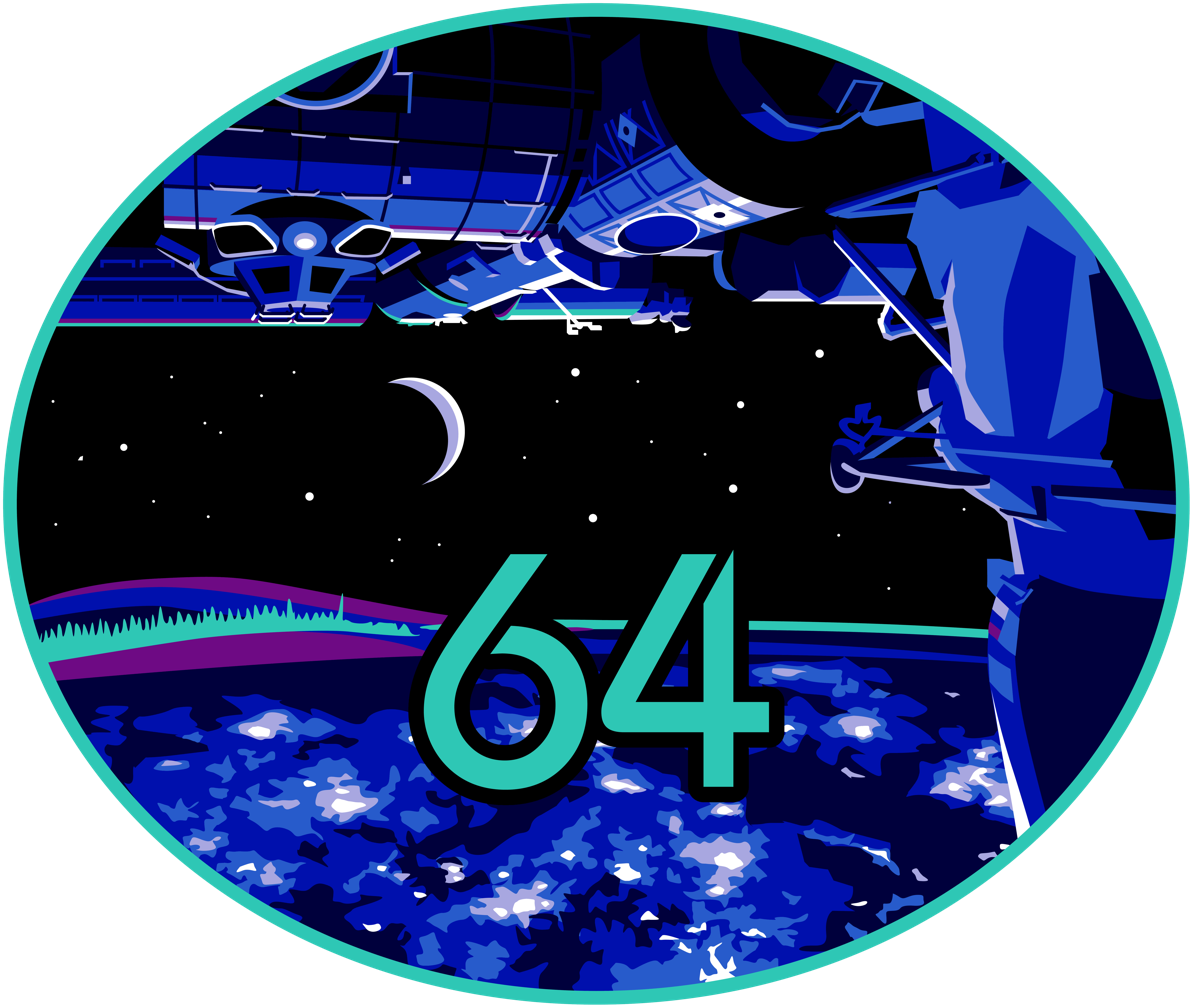
- Mission insignia
- Retired: July 10, 2025

Shannon Walker (born June 4, 1965) is an American physicist and a former NASA astronaut selected in 2004. She launched on her first mission into space on June 25, 2010, on board Soyuz TMA-19 and spent over 163 days in space.

She returned to space for her second long-duration mission on November 15, 2020, on board SpaceX Crew-1, the first operational flight of SpaceX's Crew Dragon spacecraft.

== Early life and education ==
Walker was born in Southwest Houston, where she graduated from Westbury High School in 1983.

She studied physics at Rice University in Texas, graduating with a Bachelor of Arts in physics in 1987.

Walker began her professional career with the Rockwell Space Operations Company at the Johnson Space Center later that year as a robotics flight controller for the Space Shuttle program. She worked several Space Shuttle missions as a flight controller in the Mission Control Center, including STS-27, STS-32, STS-51, STS-56, STS-60, STS-61, and STS-66.

From 1990 to 1993, Walker took a leave of absence from Johnson Space Center to attend graduate school, where her area of study was the solar wind interaction with the Venusian atmosphere. She received a Master of Science and a PhD in Space Physics from Rice University in 1992 and 1993.

In 1995, she joined the NASA civil service and began working in the International Space Station (ISS) Program at the Johnson Space Center.

Walker worked in robotics integration, working with the ISS International Partners to design and build the robotics hardware for the Space Station. In 1998, she joined the ISS Mission Evaluation Room (MER) as a manager for coordinating on-orbit problem resolution for the ISS.

In 1999, Walker moved to Moscow to work with the Russian Space Agency and its contractors in avionics integration and integrated problem solving for the ISS. She returned to Houston in 2000 and became the technical lead for the ISS MER and the Deputy Manager of the On-Orbit Engineering Office. Later, she became Acting Manager of the On-Orbit Engineering Office.

== Astronaut career ==
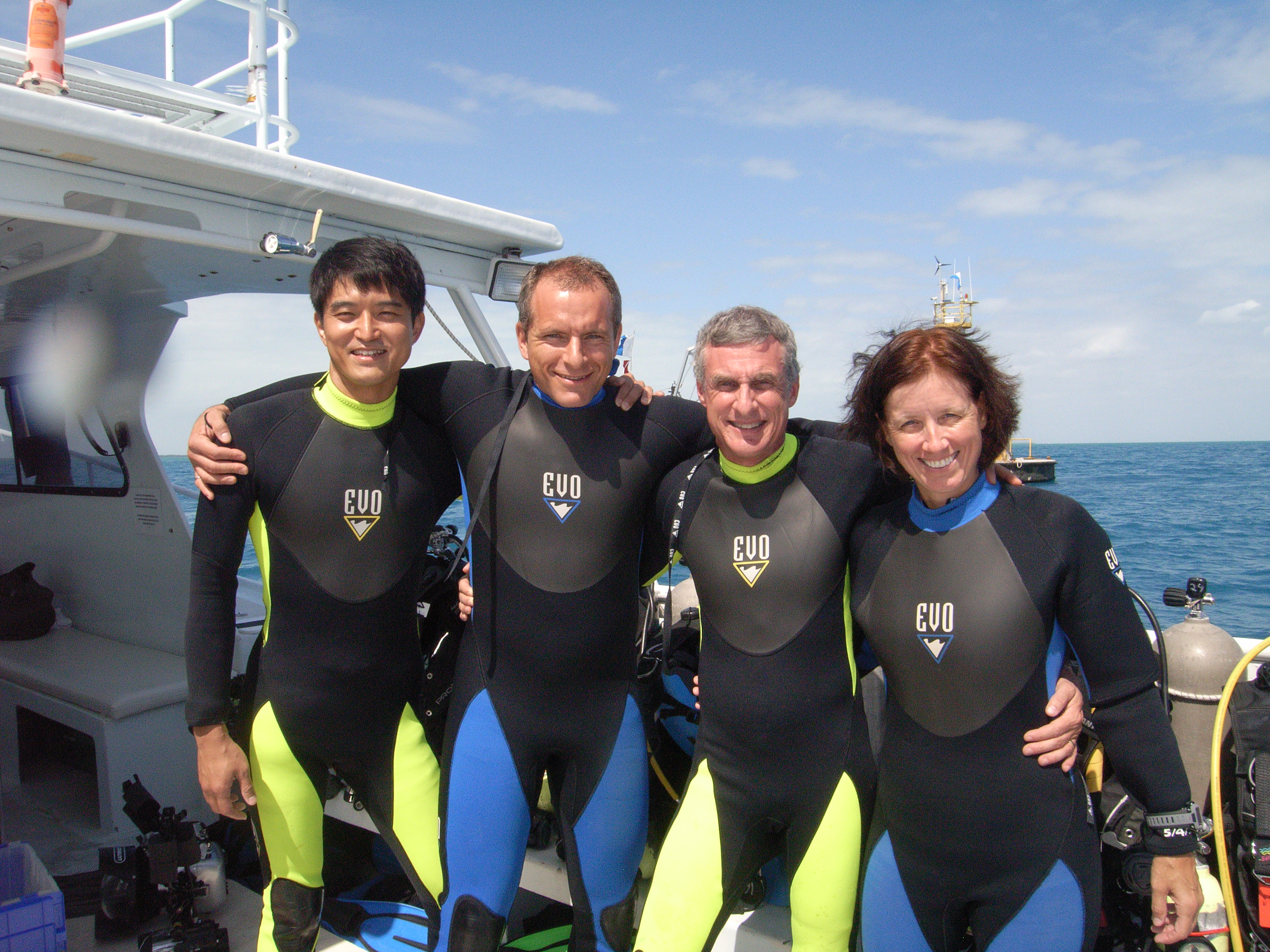
The NEEMO 15 Crew: Left to right: Takuya Onishi, David Saint-Jacques, Steve Squyres, Walker.

In May 2004, Walker was selected by NASA as an astronaut candidate as part of the 19th class of astronauts. In February 2006, she completed Astronaut Candidate Training, including scientific and technical briefings, intensive instruction in Shuttle and International Space Station systems, physiological training, T-38 flight training, and water and wilderness survival training. Completion of this initial training qualified her for various technical assignments within the Astronaut Office and future flight assignment as a mission specialist.

On September 19, 2011, NASA announced that Walker would command the NEEMO 15 undersea exploration mission aboard the Aquarius underwater laboratory from October 17–30, 2011. Delayed by stormy weather and high seas, the mission began on October 20, 2011. On the afternoon of October 21, Walker and her crew officially became aquanauts, having spent over 24 hours underwater. NEEMO 15 ended early on October 26 due to the approach of Hurricane Rina.

In 2017 Walker served as backup for NASA astronaut Joe Acaba for Expedition 53/54, and she herself was scheduled to launch on board Soyuz MS-12 in early 2019 and serve on Expedition 59/60. She was removed from the flight and replaced with Christina Koch well before launch.

=== Expedition 24/25 ===
Walker was assigned as backup to NASA Astronaut Jeff Williams for ISS Expedition 21/22, directly serving as backup commander for Expedition 22. Following the launch of Expedition 21/22 on Soyuz TMA-16 in September 2009, Walker was assigned to the prime crew of Expedition 24/25.

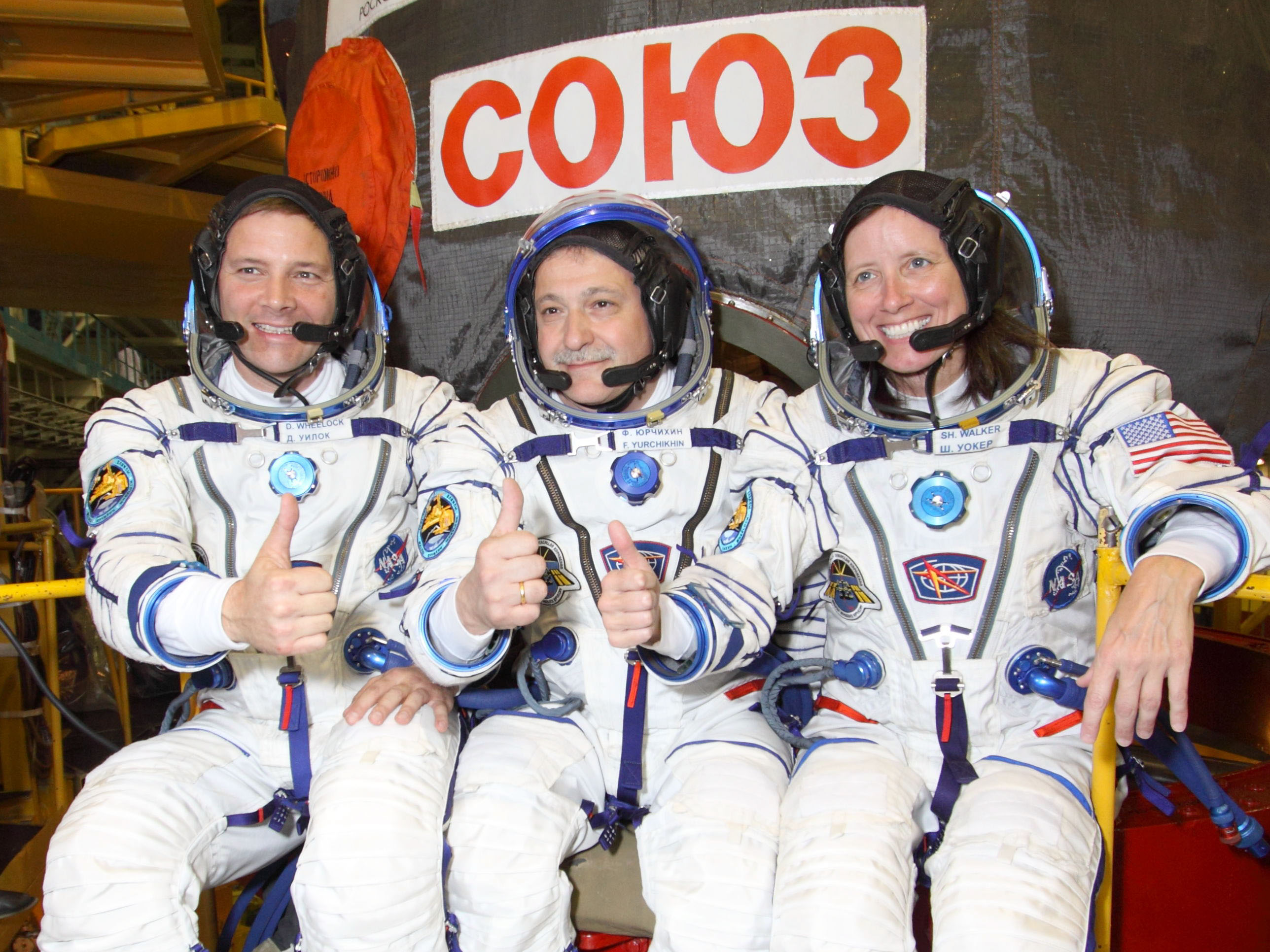
Soyuz TMA-19 Crew (Walker on the right) prior to launch

On June 15, 2010, Walker launched on board Soyuz TMA-19, alongside fellow NASA astronaut Douglas Wheelock and Roscosmos cosmonaut Fyodor Yurchikhin. Two days later the trio rendezvoused with the ISS and docked to the Zvezda module, officially becoming part Expedition 24 crew. During Expedition 24, Walker and her two Soyuz TMA-19 counterparts made a 30-minute excursion inside of their Soyuz to move from the Zvezda module to the new Rassvet module, which had been delivered on board STS-132 during the previous Expedition. The three became the first crewmembers to dock with the new module.

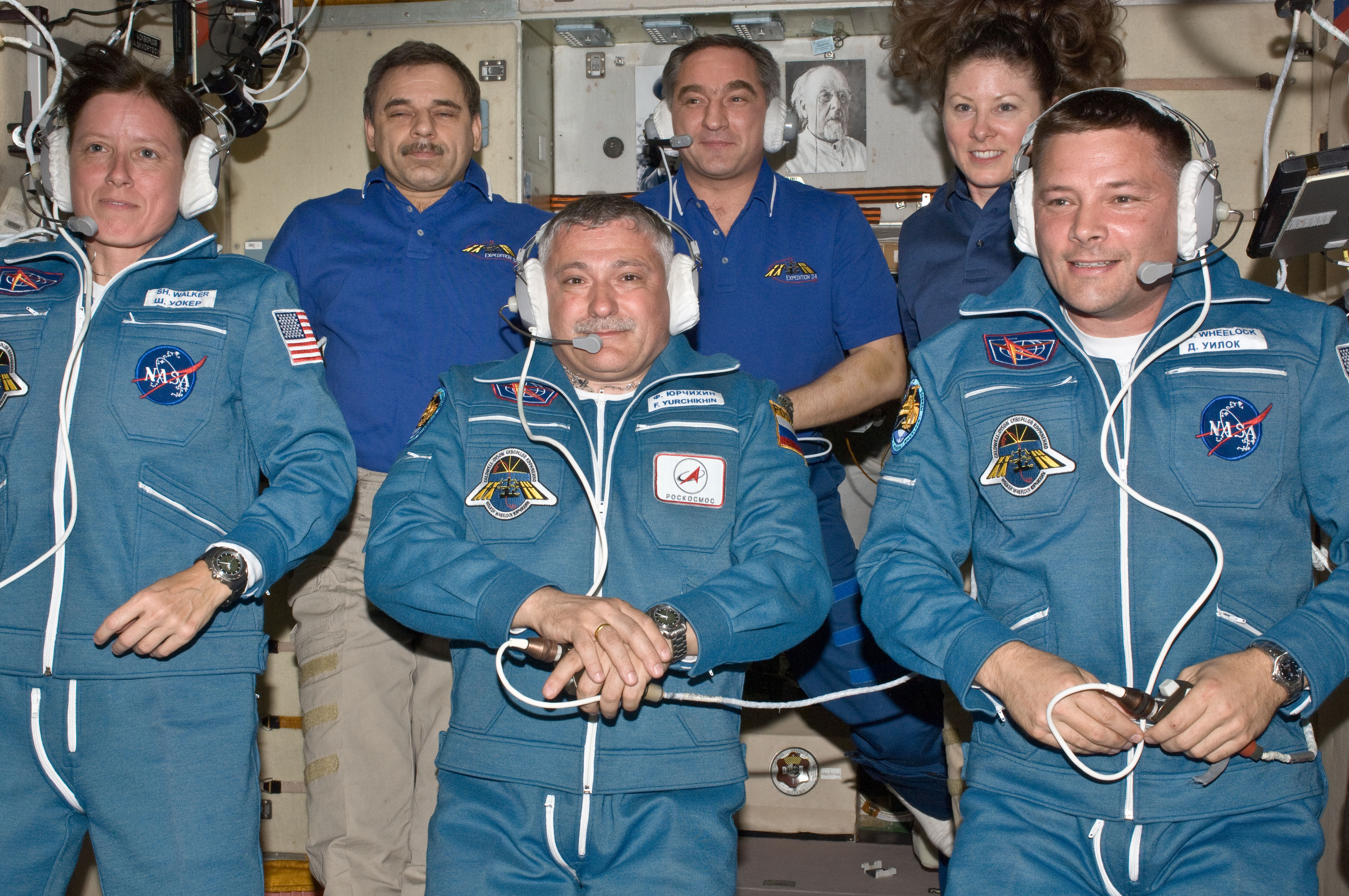
Walker (bottom left) following her arrival aboard the ISS

Upon the departure of the crew of Soyuz TMA-18 on September 25, 2010, Walker and her two crewmates became part of Expedition 25. They were soon joined by the three crew members on board Soyuz TMA-01M. On November 26, 2010, Walker, Wheelock and Yurchikin departed the ISS on board Soyuz TMA-19 and began their return home. The three returned to Earth at 04:46 UTC on November 26, 2010, 78 kilometers from Arkalyk, Kazakhstan.

=== Expedition 64/65 ===
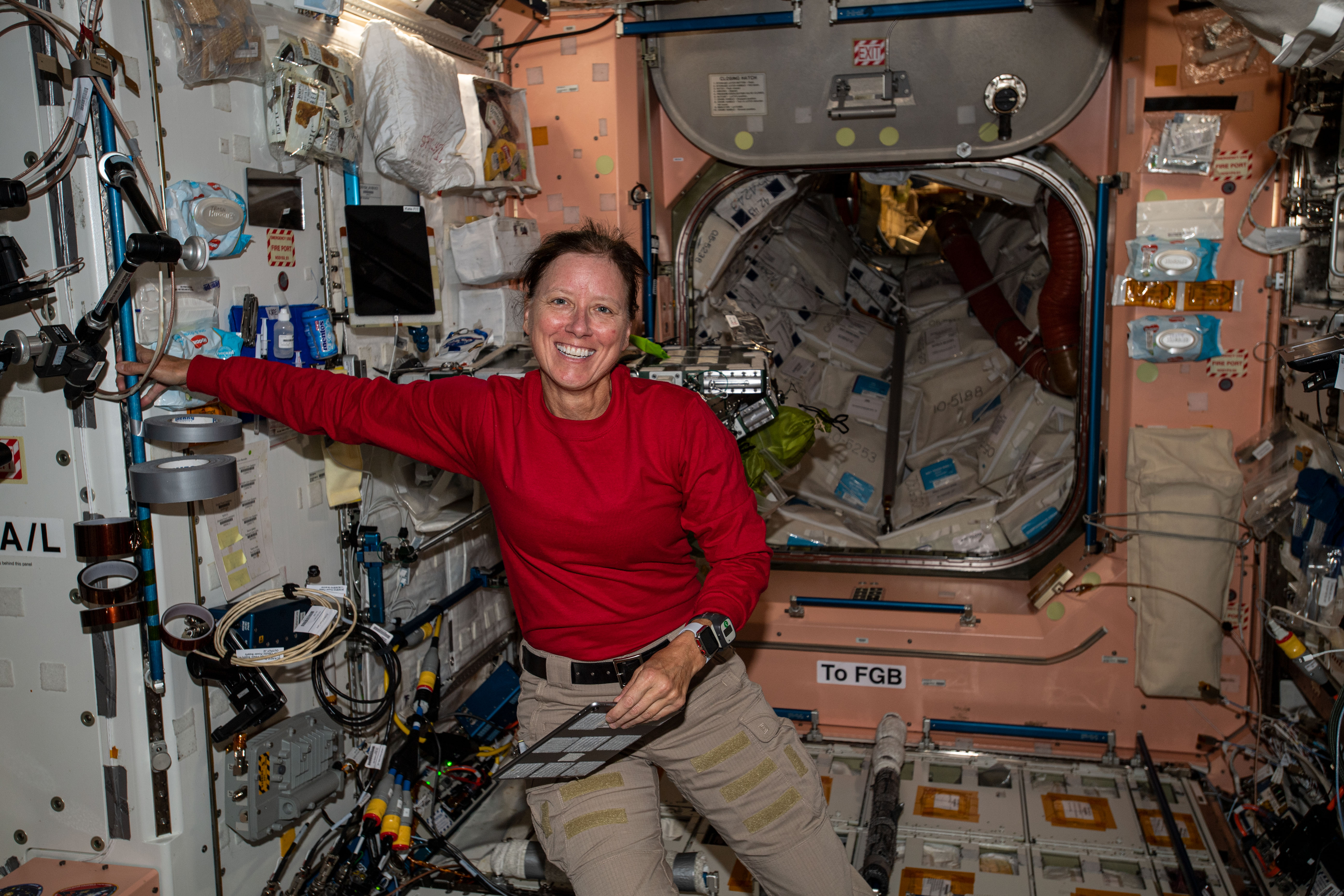
Walker pictured during Expedition 64

On March 31, 2020, NASA announced Walker would be returning to space for her second spaceflight on board USCV-1, the first operational flight of SpaceX's Crew Dragon spacecraft and the first operational flight of the Commercial Crew Program. Walker launched on November 15, 2020. She and her three crewmates spent 167 days aboard the ISS as part of Expedition 64/65.

Self-presentation for the SpaceX Crew-1 mission

The crew, including Walker as mission specialist, docked to the ISS and join the Expedition 64 crew in November, alongside Russian cosmonauts, commander Sergey Ryzhikov and Sergey Kud-Sverchkov, as well as NASA astronaut Kathleen Rubins. When the Soyuz MS-17 crew left the station, in April 2021, Walker and her three crewmates transferred over to Expedition 65, with Walker taking command of the expedition, becoming only the third female ISS commander and the shortest commander of ISS, serving only for approximately 11 days.

=== Retirement ===
Shannon Walker retired from NASA on July 10, 2025, concluding a distinguished career that spanned 38 years, including more than 30 years of federal service and over 21 years as a NASA astronaut.

During her time at NASA, Walker flew on two long-duration missions and accumulated a total of 330 days in space. Her work contributed to numerous scientific investigations and technology demonstrations aboard the International Space Station.

In her later years at NASA, she served in leadership roles, including deputy chief of the Astronaut Office, where she helped oversee astronaut training and operations. Her retirement was officially announced in July 2025, marking the end of a career noted for technical expertise, pioneering spaceflight achievements, and mentorship within the astronaut corps.

== Awards and honors ==
Goethe Institute Scholarship for Study Abroad, Rice Fellowship for Graduate Study, Rockwell Sustained Superior Performance Award; seven Group Achievement Awards for work in the International Space Station (ISS) Program; three Going the Extra Mile Awards for work in the ISS Program; a Space Flight Awareness Award for contributions to the ISS Program; and nine Performance Bonus Awards.

She is a member of the Aircraft Owners and Pilots Association (AOPA) and The Ninety-Nines International Organization of Women Pilots.

In 2022, SpaceX's Dragon support vessel GO Navigator was renamed Shannon along with GO Searcher as Megan after SpaceX Crew-2 astronaut, Megan McArthur.

Dr. Shannon Walker Library of the Houston Public Library (HPL), in Westbury, Houston, is named after her.

== Personal life ==
She is married to retired NASA astronaut, Australian-born Andy Thomas.

Walker's recreational interests include cooking, soccer, running, weight training, flying, camping, and travel.

Preceded by Sergey Ryzhikov	ISS Commander (Expedition 65); 15 to 27 April 2021	Succeeded by Akihiko Hoshide
