= Brays Oaks, Houston =

Area in Southwest Houston, Texas, United States

Coordinates: 29.66°N 95.50°W

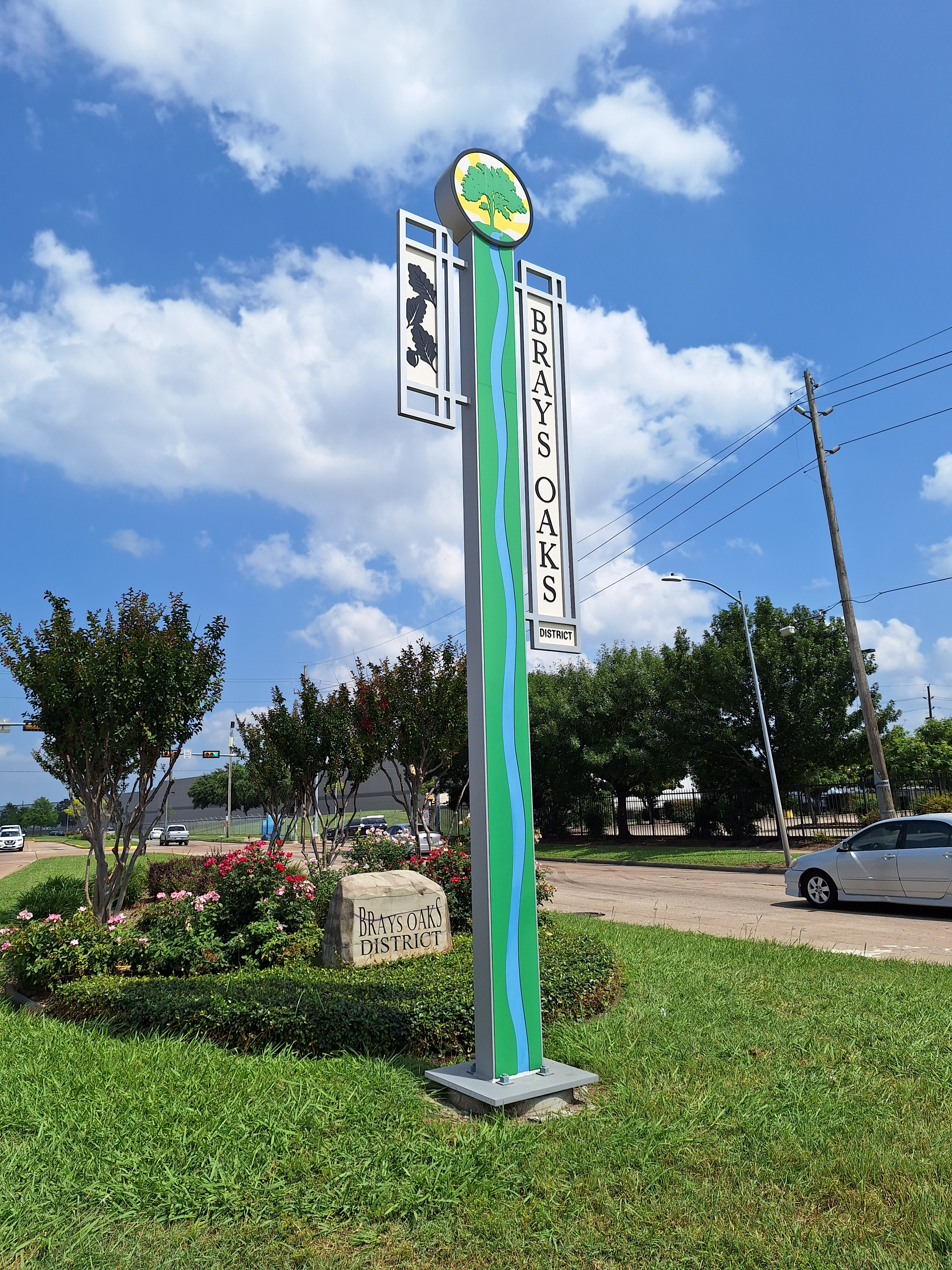
Brays Oaks sign

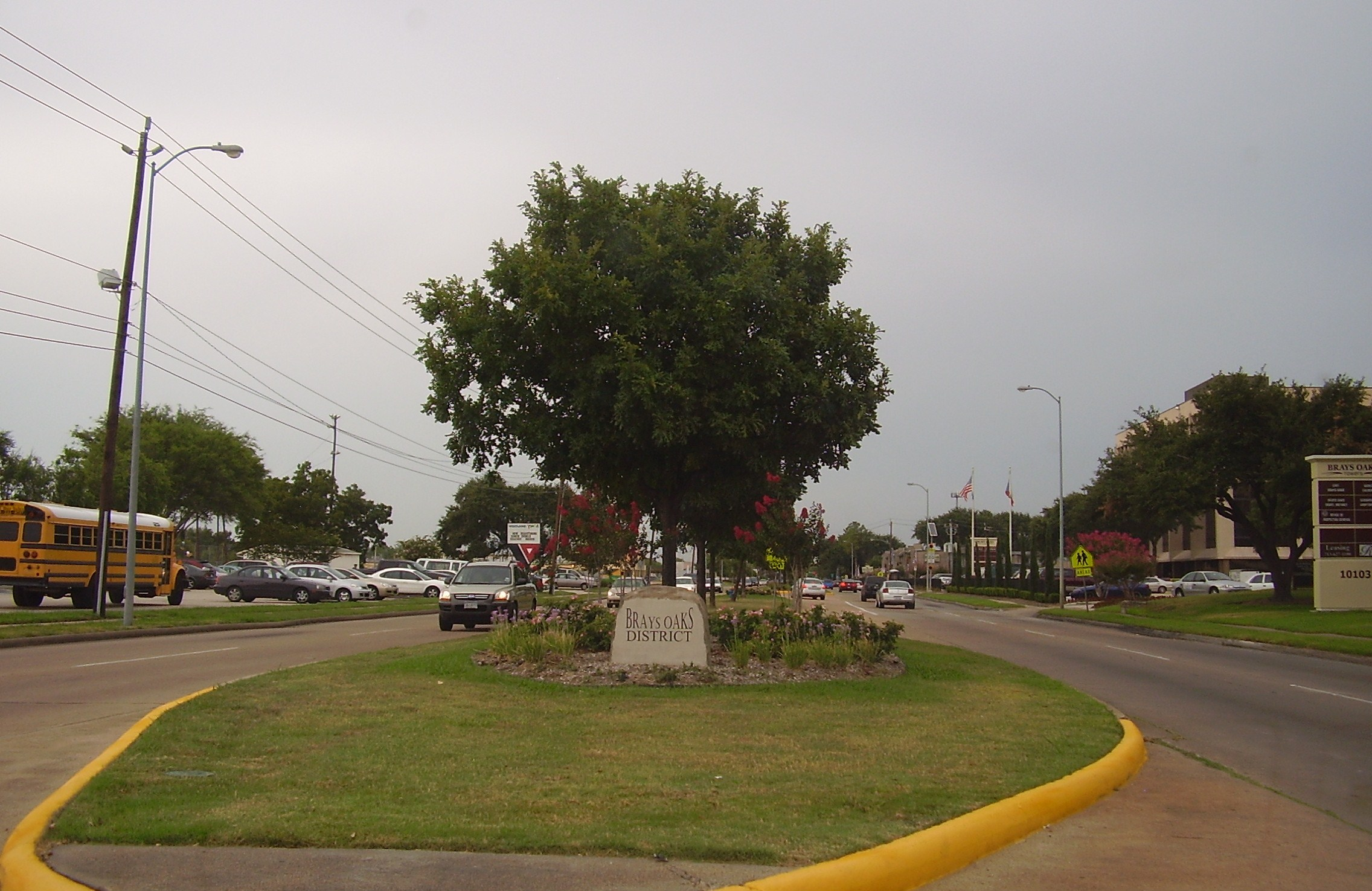
Brays Oaks

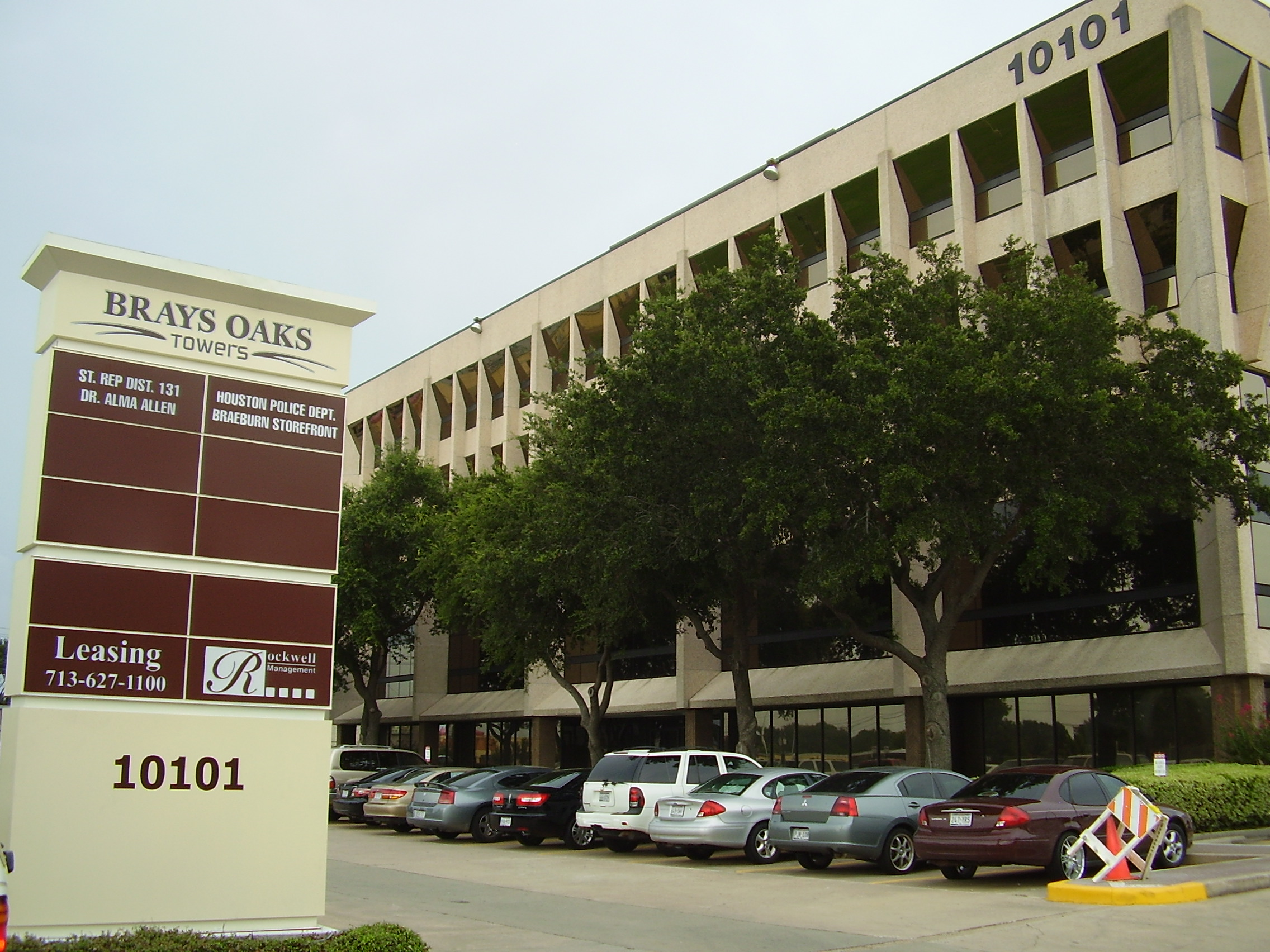
Brays Oaks Towers 10101 Fondren Road, which includes the Braeburn Storefront and the offices of State Representative Alma Allen

Brays Oaks, formerly known as Fondren Southwest, is an area in Southwest Houston, Texas, United States. The Brays Oaks Management District, also known as the Harris County Improvement District #5, governs the Brays Oaks area as well as other surrounding areas, such as Westbury. The City of Houston also defines the Brays Oaks Super Neighborhood, with separate boundaries.

== History ==
The area now known as Brays Oaks was originally the ranch property of Walter Fondren, an oil businessperson.

In the late 1970s and early 1980s many apartments opened in an 8 square miles (21 km^{2}) area then known as Fondren Southwest. The community was mostly White and Jewish. The newly established apartments attracted young, White professionals who were leaving Stella Link and other declining areas. The area economy benefited from the increase in population, and many expensive restaurants and strip malls opened in Fondren Southwest. At one time many members of the Houston Rockets and other sports teams resided in the Northfield subdivision, which was among the outermost parts of the city in 1974, in Fondren Southwest.

In the mid-1980s the oil-based economy collapsed. Property values decreased and apartment complexes began to decline. The young professionals left the apartments. The expensive restaurants left the area, since the young professionals left. The owners of the apartments lowered rent rates and offered "free move-in" specials. Many poor African-American and Hispanic families moved into units originally designated for singles and couples. Apartment complexes failed and received foreclosure. Many apartments had changed of ownership around every two years; the out of state owners were more interested in maximizing profits and less interested in the maintenance of the complexes. In the late 1980s the White population decreased and the Black and Hispanic populations increased.

By the mid-1990s property values in the area began to increase and several middle class minorities moved into Fondren Southwest. Around the 2000s Orthodox Jewish congregations moved to Fondren Southwest. In 2005 Houston City Council Member Mark Goldberg and Jim Myers, head of the nonprofit group Southwest Houston 2000 Inc., lobbied the state government, asking the state to create what was originally called the Fondren Ranch Management District. In June 2005 the 79th Texas Legislature created the Brays Oaks Management District in the area. KTRK-TV described the name change as a rebranding for the community.

In 2005 residents of an area at the intersection of Beltway 8 and West Bellfort Road protested against the construction of a proposed trash transfer station. The area sits on a landfill previously used by the cities of Bellaire and West University Place.

In 2009 the district began a $250,000 master plan to increase identification of the area and to beautify esplanades. Ten 800-pound (360 kg) boulders were placed in the district esplanades beginning on January 22, 2009.

In 2011 the district expanded in size.

== Cityscape ==
The district, entirely within the City of Houston and Harris County, has 15 square miles (39 km^{2}) of territory, centered on the historical Fondren Southwest area. The district is bounded by Interstate 69/U.S. Route 59, Bissonnet Road, U.S. Route 90A/Main Street, and South Post Oak. As of 2011 it has about 73,000 residents in about 2,700 households. Several subdivisions, including Braeburn Valley West, Glenshire, and Westbury are in Brays Oaks. The district expanded in size in 2011.

Originally, the district had about 9 square miles (23 km^{2}) of land. It was bounded by Interstate 69/U.S. Route 59, Brays Bayou, Hillcroft Avenue, and U.S. Route 90A (South Main), including areas within the City of Houston and excluding areas within the Westbury subdivision. In 2005 what would become the original boundaries include 37 neighborhoods with about 12,000 single-family houses. It also included about 76 apartment complexes with over 15,000 units. The original Fondren Southwest area has the boundaries of South Braeswood, U.S. 90A, Hillcroft, and I-69/U.S. 59. Most apartments in Fondren Southwest have between 300 and 400 units. Lori Rodriguez of the Houston Chronicle said that many of them "bear names evocative of more idyllic times: Sandpiper. Rainy Meadows."

Originally the only residential establishments in Fondren Southwest were houses. Gessner Road was a dirt road, and the pavement along South Braeswood Boulevard ended at Fondren Road. Ruth Hurst, a resident quoted in the Houston Chronicle, said "It was like living in the middle of the city, but in the country".

In 1990, of the housing facilities in Fondren Southwest community, 60% were multifamily facilities, and 40% were single family facilities. Of the housing units, 54% were occupied by renters, 31% were occupied by owners, and the remainder were vacant. In 1997 Fondren Southwest had about 60 apartment complexes. Many of the apartment complexes were not designed to house children.

== Economy ==
As of 2005 the area that would become the original Brays Oaks district boundaries had between 200 and 300 businesses. State of Texas guidelines consider apartment complexes to be commercial businesses, so the figure includes apartment complexes. Foodarama has its corporate headquarters in Store #1 in Brays Oaks.

== Demographics ==
In 2015 the Brays Oaks Super Neighborhood, a City of Houston-defined area with different boundaries from the management district, had 64,548 people. 45% were non-Hispanic black, 33% were Hispanic or Latino, 13% were non-Hispanic White, 6% were non-Hispanic Asian, and 2% were non-Hispanic others. The per square mile population was 8.160.

In 2000 the super neighborhood, then known as the Greater Fondren Southwest Super Neighborhood, had 49,436 residents. 53% were non-Hispanic black, 25% were Hispanic or Latino, 15% were non-Hispanic whites, 6% were non-Hispanic Asians, and 2% were non-Hispanic others. The number of persons per square mile was 6,250.

In the late 1980s the White population in the Fondren Southwest area decreased from 74 percent to 41 percent. During the same decade the African-American population increased from 14 percent to 47 percent and the Hispanic population increased from 8 percent to 21 percent. Between the 1990 U.S. census and the 2000 U.S. census, Fondren Southwest finished shifting from a mostly White and Jewish community to a mostly Black community. The black population increased from 22,942 to 36,625, a 60% increase. The White population decreased from 23,994 to 13,328, a 44% decrease.

Fondren Southwest is home to one of the centers of Orthodox Jewish life in Houston. The neighborhood is home to three Orthodox synagogues: Chabad Lubavitch Center of Houston, Young Israel of Houston, and Congregation Beth Rambam. The neighborhoods surrounding the synagogues have an eruv maintained by Young Israel of Houston. There are also two Orthodox Jewish day schools in the area: Torah Day School of Houston and Yeshivat Torat Emet. There is also an Orthodox Jewish girls' high school, Torah Girls Academy of Texas.

== Government and infrastructure ==
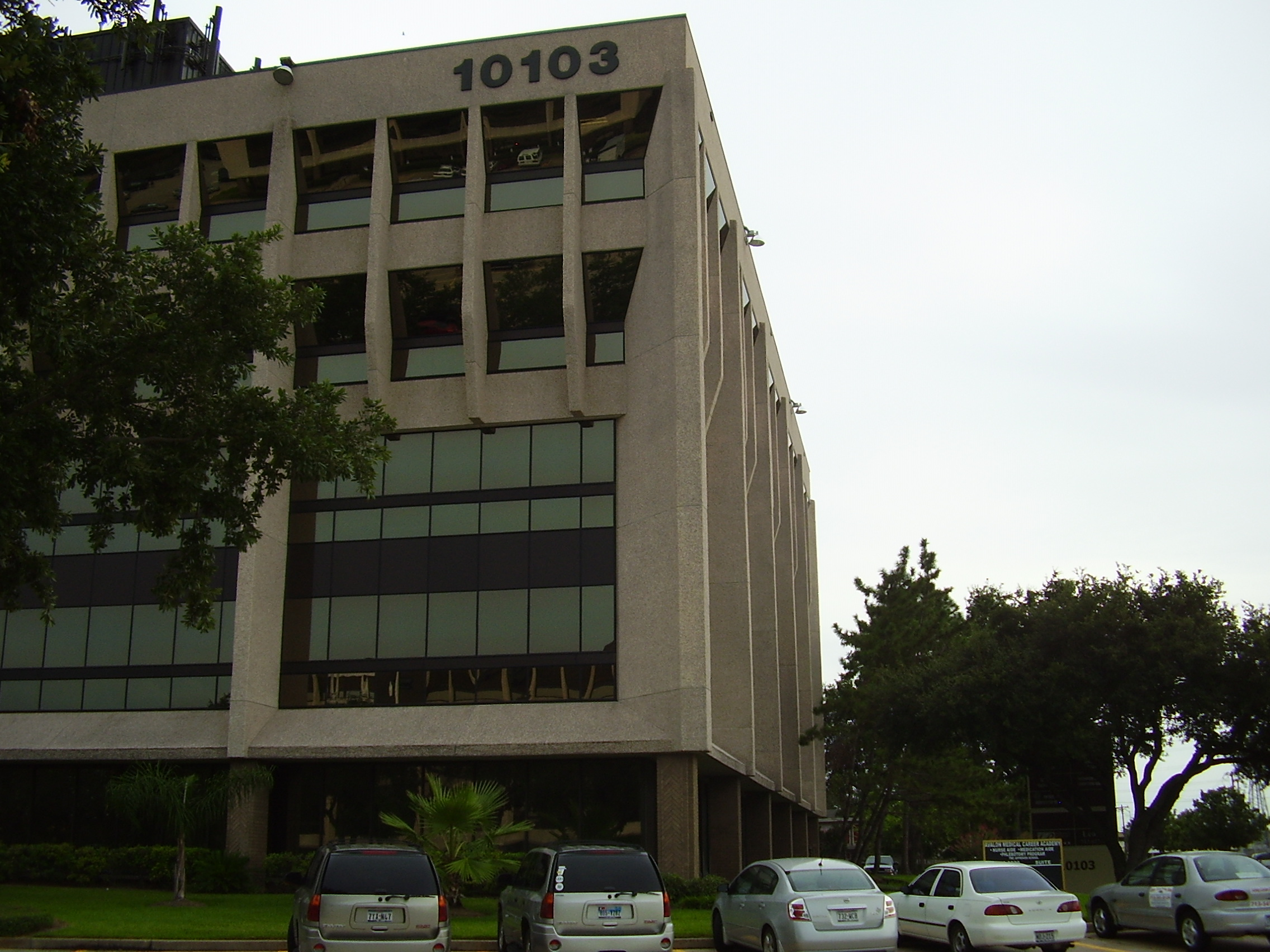
Brays Oaks Towers 10103 Fondren Road contains the Brays Oaks Management District offices

The Brays Oaks Towers, located at 10101 and 10103 Fondren Road at Dumfries, contain various agencies and services for the community; the management district is headquartered in Suite 300 at 10103 Fondren. The two structures, each with five stories and 100,000 square feet (9,300 m^{2}) of space, opened in 1981 as Chancellor Atrium 1 and 2. Rockwell Management, operating as Brays Oaks Towers LP, purchased them in September 2006. After a multimillion-dollar renovation the towers re-opened in June 2007. They were the first commercial buildings to be redeveloped in the area in two decades.

Most of Braes Oaks is within Houston City Council District K. Portions are within districts C and J. In the 2000s all of what is now Brays Oaks was in District C. In the 1990s almost all of it was in district C, with a small portion in District F.

Most of Brays Oaks is served by the Houston Police Department's South Gessner Division (formerly Fondren Patrol Division), with headquarters at 11168 Fondren Road in Brays Oaks. In 1992 what is now the Fondren Patrol Division was a storefront under the jurisdiction of the Southwest Patrol Division, headquartered on Beechnut Street outside of Brays Oaks. In 1998 the Fondren Patrol division had been established. On September 13, 2010, the City of Houston held a groundbreaking for the new Fondren Police Station. The station, which will house 176 police officers and serve about 124,000 Houston residents, is scheduled to be completed by August 2011. The Houston City Council approved $6.3 million for the construction of the new police station. The Fondren Patrol Division operates the Braeburn Storefront Station at 10101 Fondren, also in Brays Oaks. The storefront relocated there from a previous location. The current station opened on Wednesday October 12, 2011. A portion of Brays Oaks is served by the Southwest Patrol Division. The Westbury Storefront Station is a part of the Southwest Patrol District.

The Houston Fire Department operates Station 82 Fondren Southwest at 11250 Braesridge; it is a part of Fire District 68. Station 82 was built in 1995. It also operates Fire Station 48 Westbury, located in Fire District 59.

Harris Health System (formerly Harris County Hospital District) designated Valbona Health Center (formerly People's Health Center) for ZIP codes 77031, 77035, 77071, 77074, and 77096. The nearest public hospital is Ben Taub General Hospital in the Texas Medical Center.

The Consulate General of Mexico was once housed at suite 555 of the 10103 tower from 1998 to early 2001.

== Crime ==
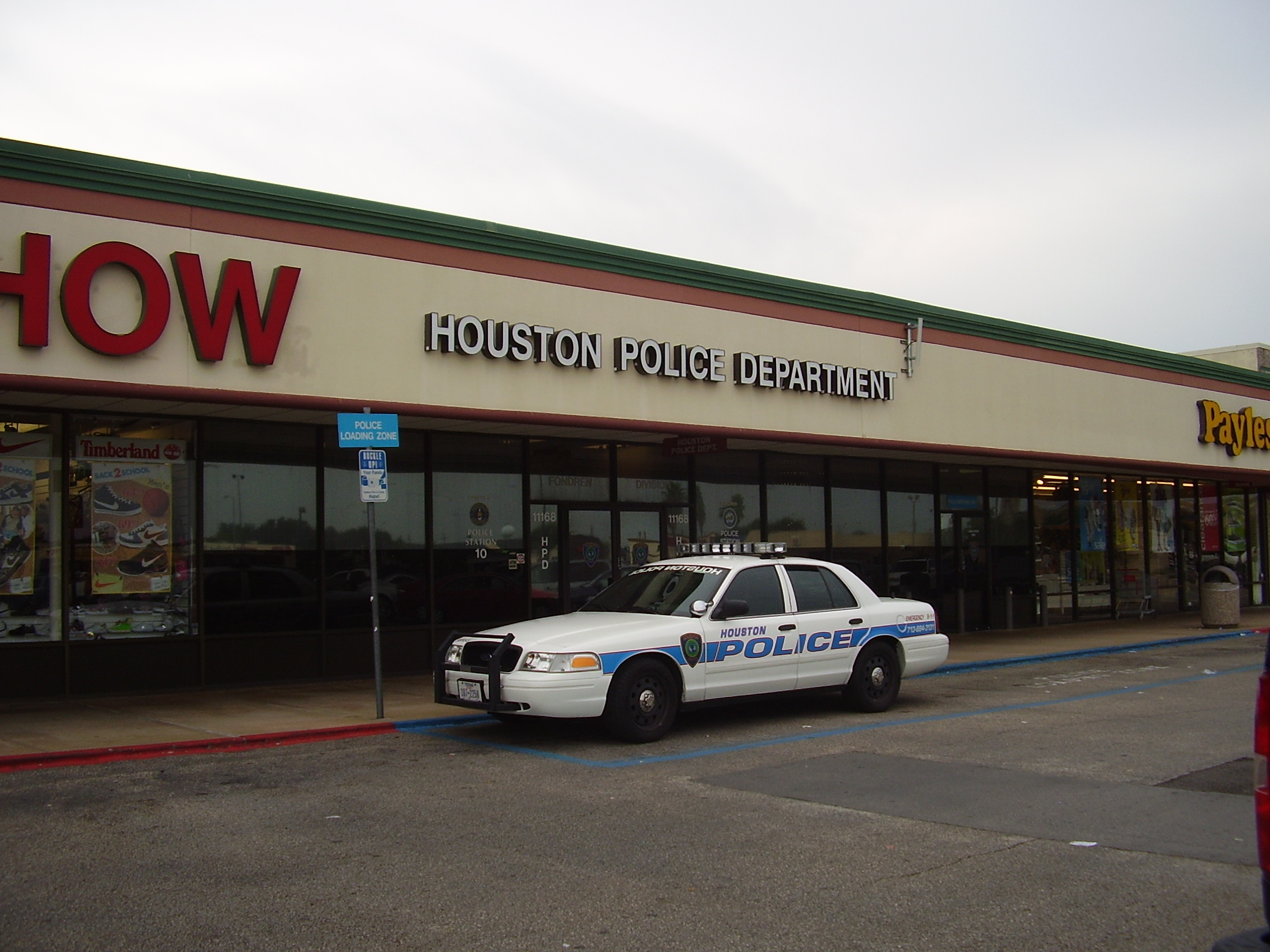
Houston Police Department Fondren Division was established in 1998, gaining its own anti-gang unit. This is the former police station.

As of 2002 the crime in Fondren Southwest largely affected apartment complexes, with homeowner subdivisions largely unaffected.

After the mid-1980s apartment complex managers lowered leasing standards and allowed known drug dealers, gang members, and individuals described by Craig Malislow of the Houston Press as "undesireables" to rent rooms. Several gangs, such as the 8900 Braeswood Bounty Hunter Bloods, the Latinos, and the Southwest Cholos, marked complexes as their territory. Innocent individuals died from stray bullets and deliberate shots from gang members. In the early 1990s residents of area subdivisions and apartment owners began to resist the increase in crime. Apartment managers began to screen tenants, add off-duty police patrols, and add additional security measures. Residential groups, police officers, and apartment managers began sharing information to prevent crime.

In the 1990s Residents of the Southmeadow subdivision sued the owners of the West Fondren and Village of the Green complexes for negligence in allowing crime in the area to increase since the complex owners failed to adequately screen tenants, did not hire security guards, and did not provide proper lighting. The residents collected a multimillion-dollar settlement, bought out the apartment complexes, and had them demolished. By 1998 the Fondren Patrol Division had been established and advocates from Fondren Southwest pressured the city government to assist them in preventing crime. Because of the upgrade the division received its own anti-gang unit.

In 2002 Lieutenant Greg Femin, the acting supervisor of the Fondren substation, said that the crime rates Fondren Southwest area had not improved as much as the Greenspoint area had due to economics; many apartment complexes still had $99 move-in specials and, as stated by Craig Mallislow of the Houston Press, Fondren Southwest complexes "rush to rent to virtually anyone." During that year the Fondren Southwest crime statistics showed an overall reduction from the statistics from one decade earlier. Aggravated assault, automobile theft, burglary, and robbery had increased from 2000 to 2001. By 2002 the rate of sexual offenses had never decreased from the 82 reported in 1991. In 2001 the 120 reported sexual offenses were the second-highest recorded in the category in a ten-year span. Femin said that the increases in the crime rates are due to a post-September 11 attacks willingness to report crime instead of a true increase in crime.

In 2005 the City of Houston closed a pool hall and sports bar, Breakers I, in Fondren Southwest after neighbors complained about a spillover of violence into the surrounding communities. In 2006 the Brays Oaks district and the Fondren Patrol combined efforts to stop graffiti. Brays Oaks contracted the gang abatement crew of the East End Management District. Martin Chavez, the head of the gang abatement crew, said that La Primera and Sureños, Mexican-American gangs, tagged sites to promote their messages. During the same year, the Houstone Tango Blast surfaced in the Fondren Southwest area. In 2007 ten Texas Southern University students did a study on the Fondren Southwest area. They concluded that an excess supply of apartment complex units was the main cause of crime, a lack of pride in the community, and unsupervised children. They also concluded that the oversupply was the reason why many apartment units were of a low quality, poorly maintained, and/or vacant.

== Education ==
=== Primary and secondary schools ===
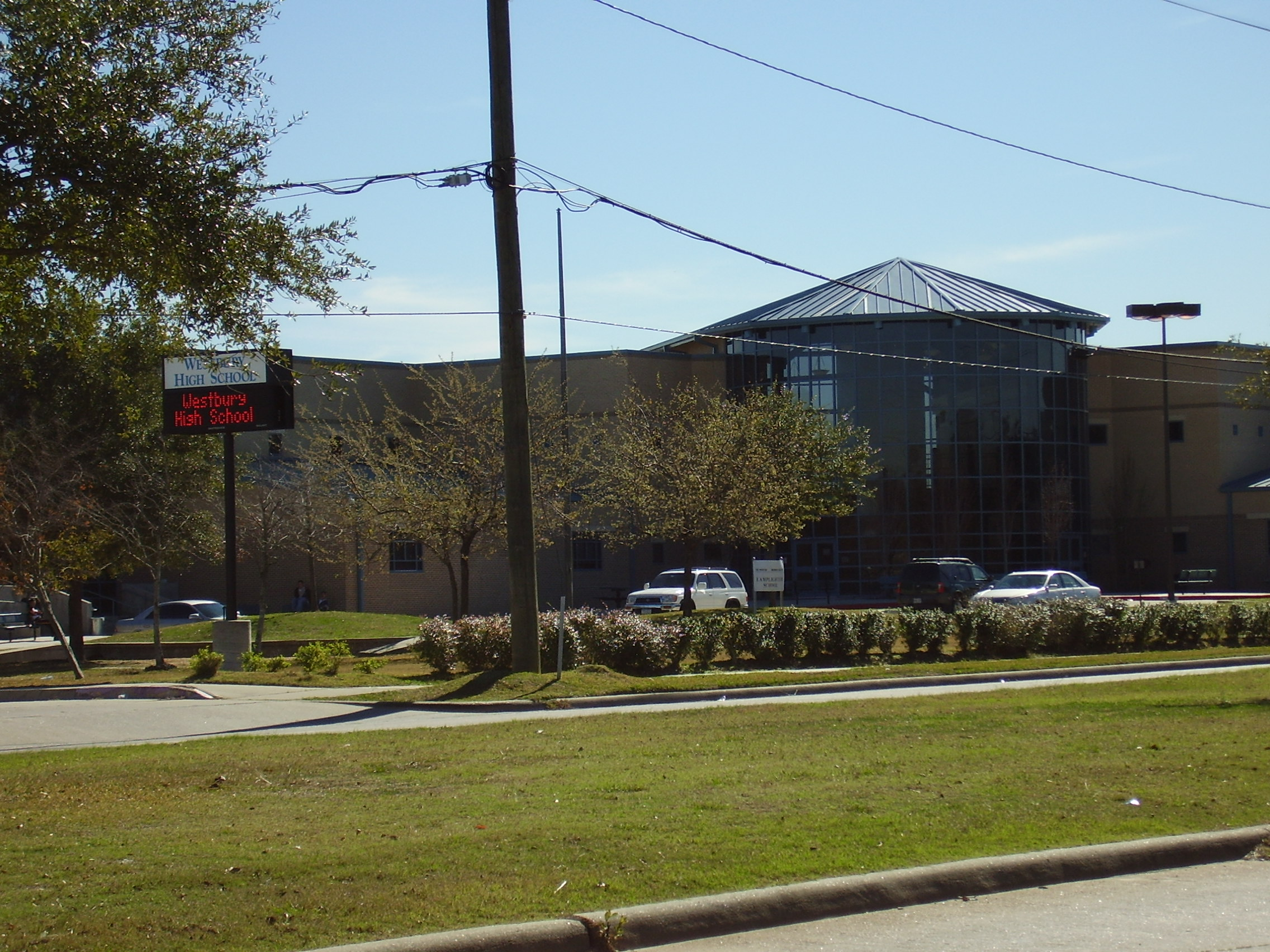
Westbury High School

The Houston Independent School District serves most of Brays Oaks.

Elementary schools within the Brays Oaks management district include Anderson, Bell, Elrod, Foerster, Gross, McNamara, Milne, Parker, Tinsley, and Valley West. Bonham Elementary School in Sharpstown serves a small section of Brays Oaks. Halpin Early Childhood Center has the Kindergarten classes feeding into Tinsley.

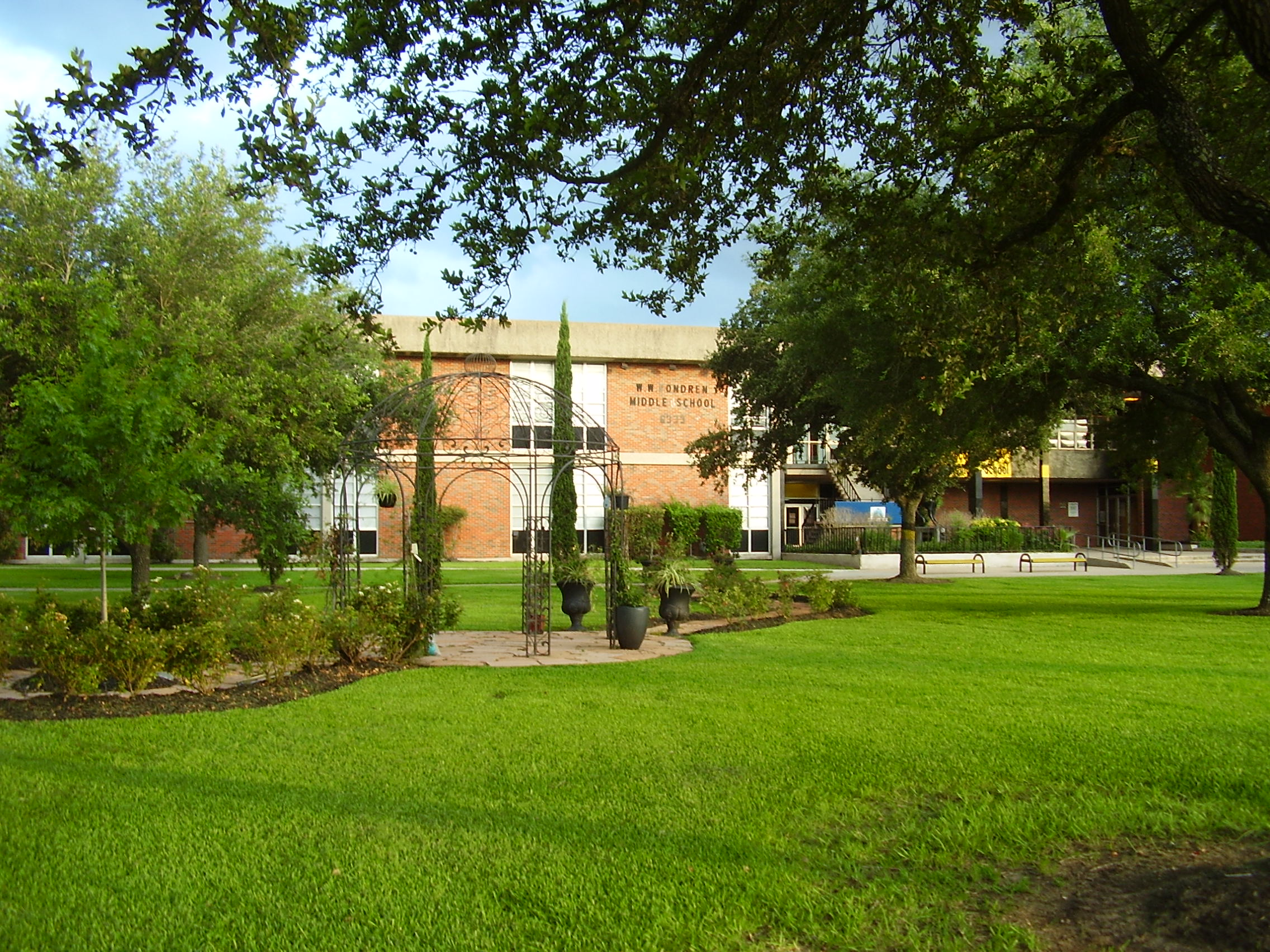
Walter W. Fondren Middle School

Two middle schools in Brays Oaks, Fondren Middle School and Welch Middle School, serve sections of Brays Oaks. Other HISD middle schools serving sections of Brays Oaks include Meyerland Performing and Visual Arts Middle School (formerly Johnston Middle School) in Meyerland and Sugar Grove Middle School in Sharpstown. Persons in portions assigned to Meyerland Middle are eligible for Pin Oak Middle School.

Areas south of West Bellfort Street and east of Fondren Road are zoned to Westbury High School in Brays Oaks, while most other areas are zoned to Sharpstown High School. A small portion is zoned to Bellaire High School.

A small portion is within the Alief Independent School District. Residents are zoned to Best Elementary School, Klentzman Intermediate School, and Olle Middle School. High school attendance is chosen by a computer lottery, which can result in the student going to Alief Elsik High School, Alief Hastings High School or Alief Taylor High School.

YES Prep Bray Oaks, a state charter school provider, operates 6-12 grade. It opened in 2009. Other charter schools include The Varnett Public School Southwest Campus, Meyerpark Elementary, Girls and Boys Prep, and La Amistad Academy.

==== History of schools ====
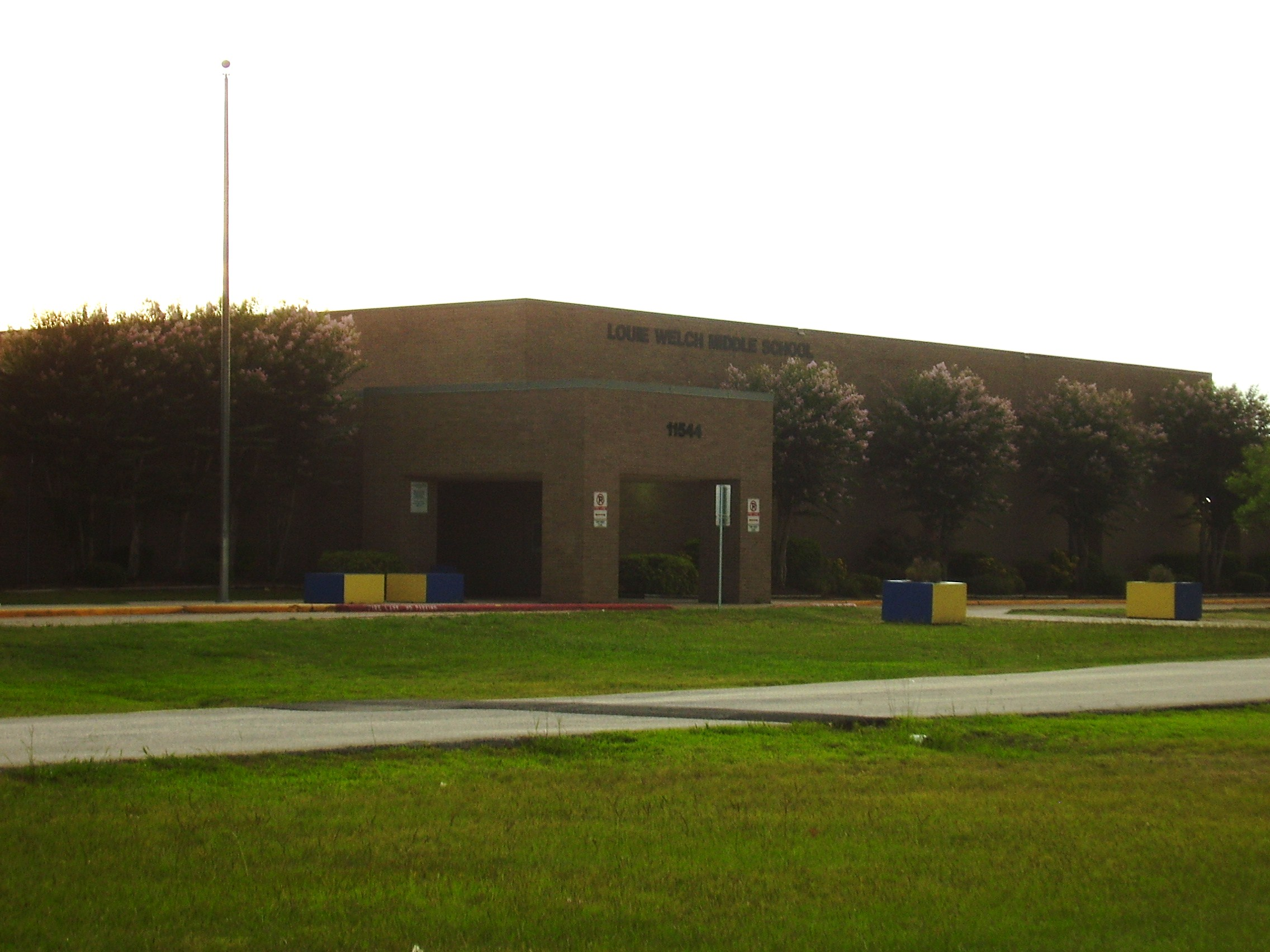
Louie Welch Middle School

Westbury High School opened in 1961. Elrod opened in 1964. Fondren Middle School opened in 1966; afterwards the Fondren family donated land for an access road into the school. Foerster opened in 1967. Sharpstown Junior–Senior High School opened in 1968; the following year the school split into Sharpstown Middle School, in the existing campus, and Sharpstown High School, on a new campus. Bell opened in 1978. Welch opened in 1979. Welch's campus was built for about 1,133 students.

In the 1980s area schools became overcrowded as more students moved in. Enrollments in area schools increased when several adults-only apartments began allowing children to live in them. For instance, Elrod's enrollment had increased steadily from 1983 onwards. In 1986 Elrod served Maplewood South and ten apartment complexes; none of the complexes existed when Elrod was originally built. In 1986 the Elrod administration expected to receive 800 students for the upcoming school year; 974 appeared on the first day of school. In 1988 Gordon re-opened to take overflow students for Elrod and one other school.

Milne opened in 1991. In August 1996 Valley West opened in ten classrooms in the Sugar Grove Elementary School campus. HISD purchased a former Food Lion building in what is now Brays Oaks and began remodeling it. Valley West moved into the former grocery store in July 1997. Halpin was dedicated during that year.

In 1996 Welch had 1,700 students, making it over capacity. There were also issues with the sewage system in the temporary building area as well as roof leaks and water issues from condensation.

Argyle Elementary School, occupying a former skating rink opened in a shopping center in 1999; it expanded by taking spaces formerly held by church offices, a dollar store, and a fitness equipment store. In fall 2001 Gross opened in the campus formerly occupied by I. Weiner Jewish Secondary School, now The Emery/Weiner School. Gross was named after real estate developer Jenard M. Gross, who owned and operated over 14,000 apartment units in various U.S. states. Argyle closed in May 2005. Sugar Grove in Sharpstown received a grade 5-6 attendance boundary in 2009.

When the management district expanded in 2011, Anderson Elementary School, McNamara Elementary School, Parker Elementary School, Westbury High School, Meyerpark Elementary, and Varnet Charter became a part of the management district.

Gordon Elementary School in the City of Bellaire served as a relief school for Elrod and Milne in Fondren Southwest/Brays Oaks and two elementary schools in Gulfton. until it was converted into a Mandarin immersion school in 2012.

=== Tertiary education ===
Houston Community College (HCC) operates the Brays Oaks Campus, a part of the Southwest College. Groundbreaking was scheduled for May 26, 2015.

=== Public libraries ===
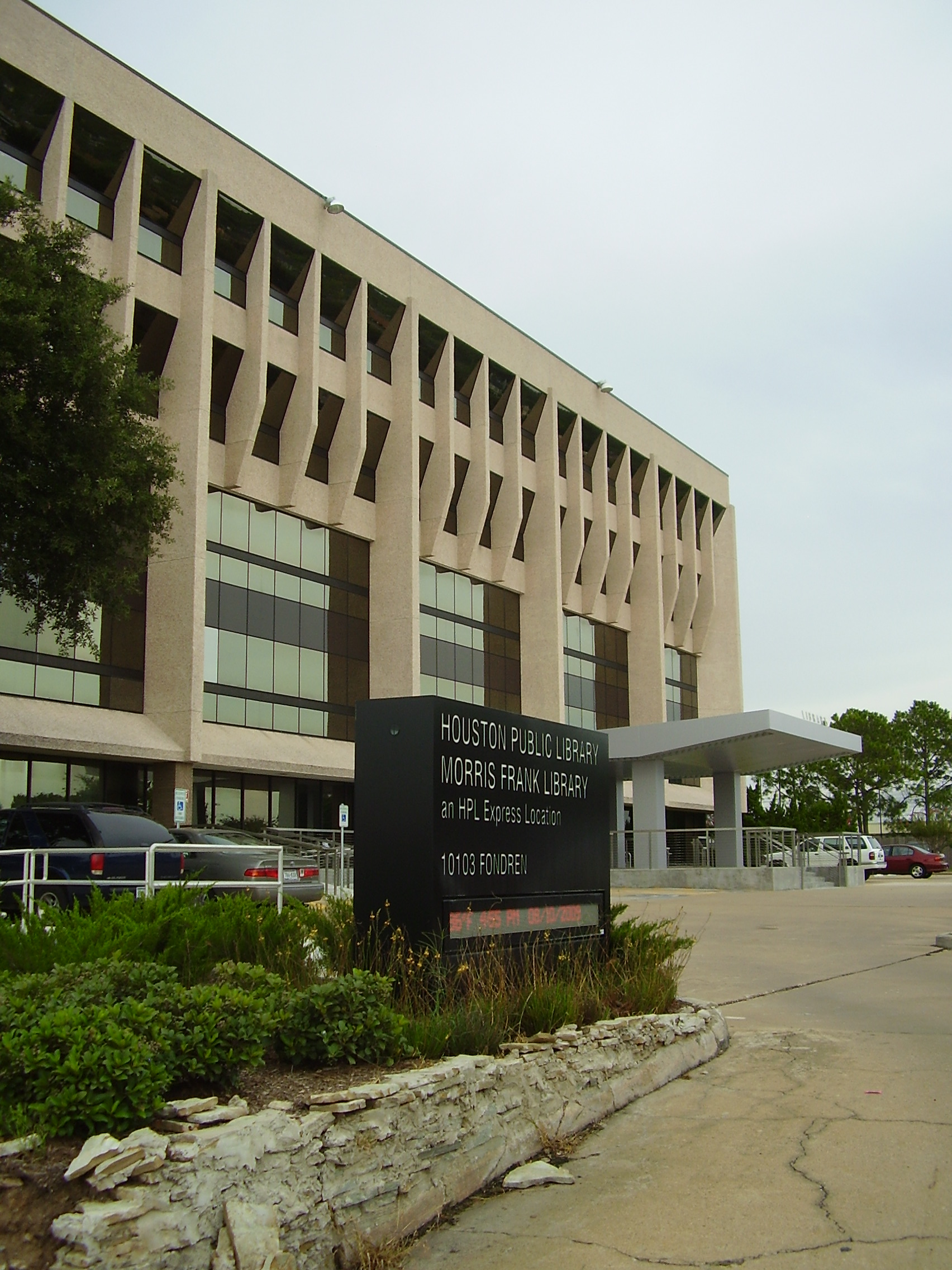
Frank HPL Express Library at Brays Oaks Towers 10103 Fondren Road

Effective 2023, Dr. Shannon Walker Neighborhood Library of the Houston Public Library (HPL) is the library location for Fondren Southwest. Its namesake is Shannon Walker.

Originally Brays Oaks had a standalone library. The original 17,000-square-foot (1,600 m^{2}) Frank Neighborhood Library opened in 1983. In 2005 about 2.5 million dollars in funds were approved to overhaul the branch. Shortly afterwards library officials found that the location was within a Harris County floodplain. Wendy Hegar, the assistant director for planning and facilities at the Houston Public Library, said that in order to keep using the original location, the library system would have had to spend millions of dollars to raise the floor of the facility by 1 foot (0.30 m) or to build a 2-foot-tall (0.61 m) concrete flood wall. Jim Myers, the community services director of the Brays Oaks District, said that the building would have had to have been raised by 18 inches (460 mm) in order for the library system to keep using it. Instead the city decided to relocate into the Brays Oaks Towers, spending around $3.9 million. Sandra Fernandez, a spokesperson for Houston Public Library, said that the estimated cost to build a new standalone library branch was 6 to 7 million dollars. The $2.5 million originally earmarked for the standalone Frank library was moved to a different project. The City of Houston entered into a 10-year lease to occupy space in the Brays Oaks Towers. By December 2009 the former Frank library facility was for sale.

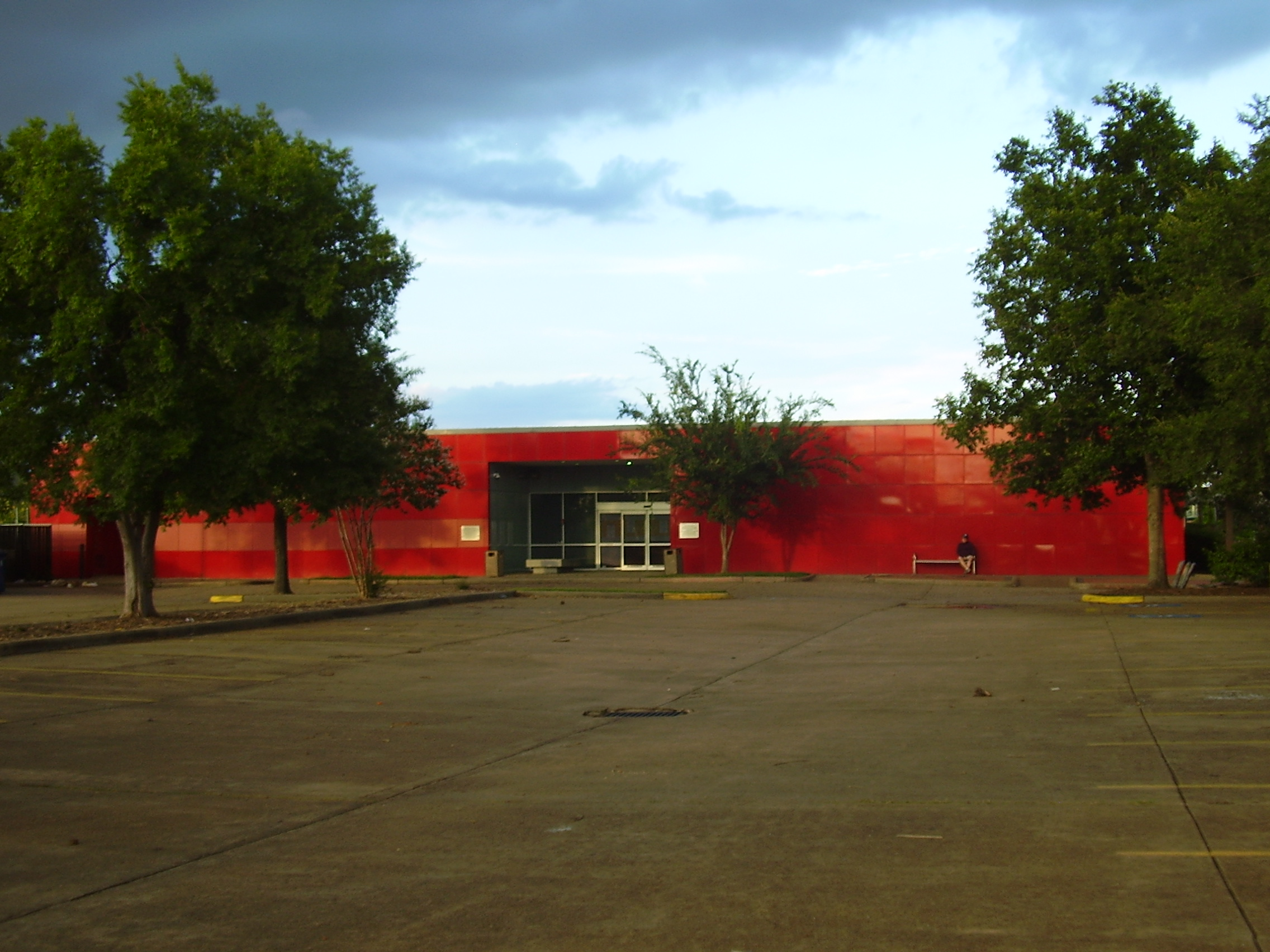
The former Frank Library

Morris Frank HPL Express Library was established in the Brays Oaks Towers. The branch was located in a 12,000-square-foot (1,100 m^{2}) section within one half of the first floor of 10103 Fondren Road. HPL Express Frank was scheduled to have around half of the 90,000 items in the standalone Frank Neighborhood Library. The standalone Frank library had about 105,000 visitors in the fiscal year 2007. In the Brays Oaks Towers location, contractors rebuilt the space to prepare the housing of a library branch, adding a separate air conditioning system, additional electrical infrastructure, additional toilets, and a redesign of the layout of the space. Etan Mirwis, president of Houston-based property management company Rockwell Management Corp, which owns the Brays Oaks Towers complex, said that he saw the addition of the library branch as a potential for his complex, as he believed several businesses considering whether to move into the complex would view the presence of the library as a benefit.

HPL was to replace HPL Frank with a new library, which also was to replace the George B. Meyer Branch in Meyerland, was established at 5505 Belrose on a 2.5-acre (1.0 ha) plot of land in Westbury. This library became the Walker Branch.

== Parks and recreation ==
The district gained more parks when it expanded in 2011.

Marian Park and Community Center is located on South Gessner Road. The community center includes a fitness center, an indoor gymnasium, meeting rooms, and a volleyball court. The park includes an outdoor basketball pavilion, a 0.25 mile hike and bicycle trail, a playground, and a lighted sports field. Other municipal parks include Braeburn Glen Park, Chimney Rock Park, Hagar Park, Haviland Park, Glenshire Park, Willow Waterhole, and Westbury Park. In addition, the Westbury Civi Club operates the Westbury Community Garden.

In regards to Fondren Southwest, Lori Rodriguez said in 1997, "Green space is at a premium; free recreational facilities, almost nil. Hundreds of latch-key children of single, working mothers wander the streets with nothing to do; nowhere to go."

== District logo ==
The logo adopted by the district includes an oak tree with several branches, water, and a yellow sun. The tree represents strength. Its branches represent the partners of the Brays Oaks community. The tree roots represent what the district says is the commitment to the community from its partners. The water represents the Brays Bayou. The sun represents what the district calls the "community’s commitment to its revitalization."

== Notable residents ==
Notable residents of Fondren Southwest:

- José Cruz (Northfield subdivision)
- Rudy Tomjanovich (Northfield subdivision)
- Don Wilson (Northfield subdivision)
