= Westbury High School (Houston) =

High school in Brays Oaks, Texas

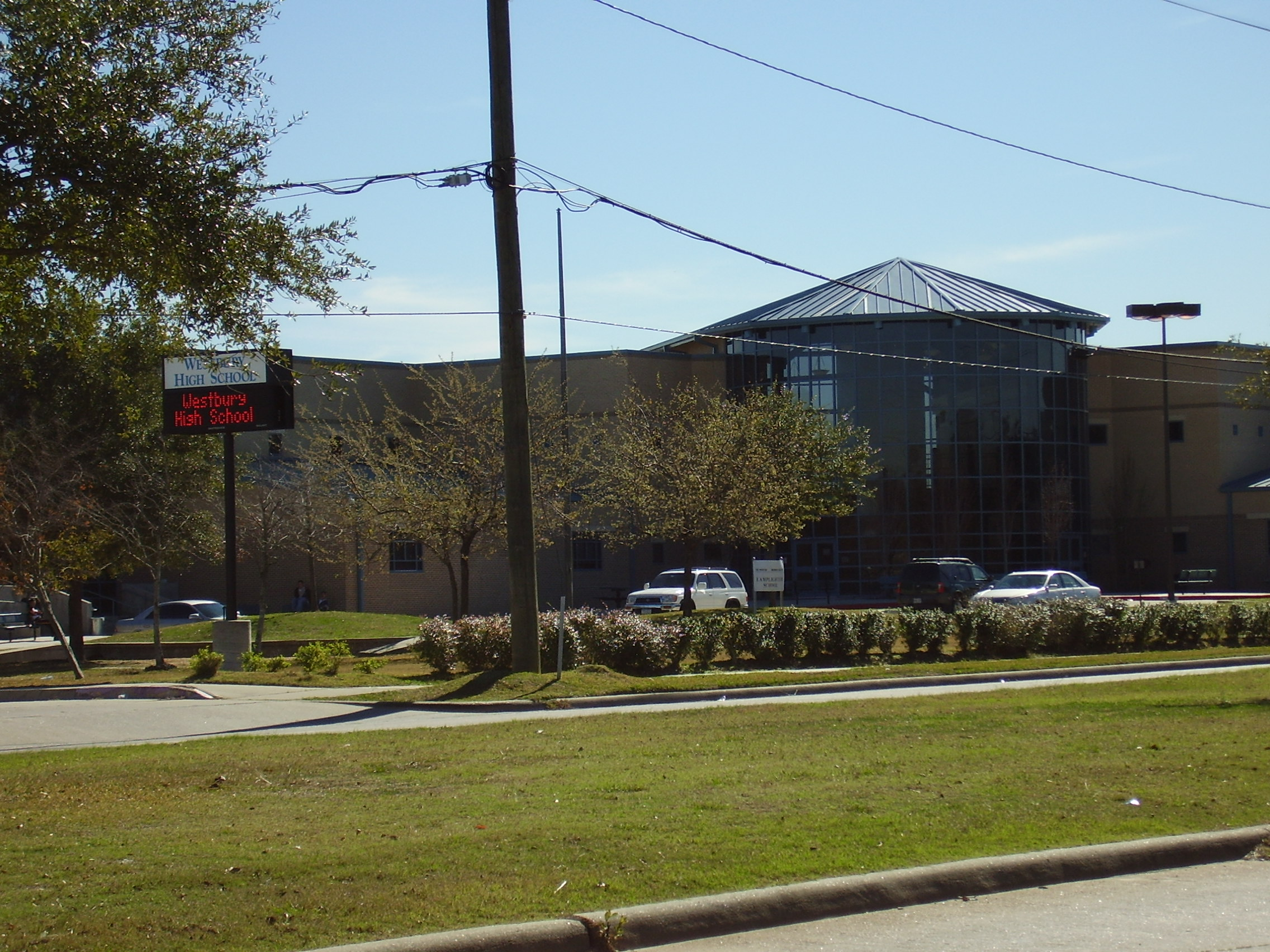
- Westbury High School entrance

Location
- 11911 Chimney Rock Road; Houston, Texas 77035; United States; 29°38′59″N 95°28′52″W

Information
- Type: High school
- Established: 1961; 65 years ago
- School district: Houston Independent School District
- NCES School ID: 482364002609
- Principal: Yolanda Bruce
- Teaching staff: 127.46 (FTE)
- Grades: 9–12
- Enrollment: 2,263 (2023-2024)
- Student to teacher ratio: 17.75
- Colors: Blue, silver and white
- Team name: Huskies
- Communities served: Westbury, Fondren Southwest, Willowbend, Willow Meadows, Westwood, HISD portion (Harris County) of Missouri City
- Website: westbury.houstonisd.org

Westbury High School is a secondary school located in the Brays Oaks, of Southwest Houston, Texas, near the Westbury neighborhood. It has grades 9 through 12, and is part of the Houston Independent School District.

In addition to its academic programs, it has automotive technology, health science, engineering, firefighting, computer technology and business career programs.

== History ==
Westbury High School opened in the fall of 1961. The three-story building with its main entrance facing Gasmer Street housed the administrative offices, classrooms, cafeteria, auditorium, library, and gym.

Westbury's 1961 enrollment consisted of 813 students – seniors, juniors, and sophomores coming from Bellaire, Lamar, and San Jacinto High Schools; and freshmen coming from Johnston Jr High School (now Meyerland Middle School). After the first year, there would not be a freshman class until the late 1970s. Of that first year's class, 58 seniors received their diplomas in the Westbury High School auditorium.

W. I. "Jim" Burns was Westbury's first principal. A lieutenant colonel in the Army Air Corps during World War II, Burns had taught chemistry at San Jacinto and Lamar High Schools, and had opened Bellaire High School as assistant principal.

There were 73 teachers in the first year. The curriculum included the academic courses — math, science, English and foreign language; the fine arts — music and art, speech, drama, journalism, home economics; the commercial subjects—typing, business machines, and business law; the industrial arts—mechanical drawing—architectural drawing, woodshop and metal shop; drivers education, physical education and the National Defense Cadet Corps.

The school set up the Oceanography/Living Resource Center to provide oceanography education and biological material for the district's science classes. Later, oceanography was phased out and it became the Living Resource Center (known as the "Frog Farm" around Westbury).

W.L. Burns died in 1966 and John Brandstetter served as the interim principal until Kenneth Gupton was appointed principal in 1967.

=== The 2000s ===
On May 18, 2001, the main education building was declared unsafe; renovation crews discovered that the concrete, intended to measure at 3,000 pounds per square inch, instead measured at 1,400 to 2,000 pounds per square inch. The district did not permit students to retrieve their belongings. The district tested the other schools built between 1956 and 1965 and did not discover structural problems. A new campus for Westbury was completed in the fall of 2004. Westbury collaborated (as have many other schools) with Brown University to set up a magnet program Coalition of Essential Schools.

On February 9, 2006, a 15-year-old girl was sexually assaulted in a second floor school restroom facility. The suspect escaped detection and left the campus before administrators realized that a sexual assault had happened. When the suspect was identified, it was revealed that he was already incarcerated for an unrelated incident. Ronald Walker pleaded guilty and received 45 years of prison for this and other sexual assault crimes.

In 2006, Charles Rotramel, executive director of the nonprofit program Youth Advocates, stated in a Houston Chronicle article that Lee High School, Westbury High School, and Sharpstown High School had suffered from the actions of youth criminal gangs.

On November 28, 2006, a 16-year-old 9th-grade boy named Julian Ruiz died from two gunshot wounds in the torso while walking to Westbury; he died at the 5400 block of Dryad as a result of a drive-by shooting. A tan or gold 1990s Mercury Cougar used as a getaway car for the shooters was discovered in Stafford on November 30. The two 17-year-old suspects in the shooting were identified as Augustin Miguel Marquez and Aldo Aguilar Ramirez. In a response to the incident, district and school officials said that the incident had occurred outside of the school property, and had no bearing on the safety of the students inside.

In fall 2007, Westbury admitted Burundian refugees who were resettled in Houston.

A 2007 Johns Hopkins University/Associated Press study referred to Westbury as a "dropout factory" where at least 40% of the entering freshman class does not make it to their senior year. During that year, 41% of high-school-age children zoned to Westbury chose to attend a different Houston ISD school.

The district named the Rita Woodward Environmental Nature Park on February 14, 2008.

=== The 2010s ===
In 2010 HISD acquired two apartment complexes in poor condition in order to expand Westbury.

In 2011 the Brays Oaks district expanded. Westbury High School became a part of the district.

In 2014 the district announced that the school would encourage all students to take Advanced Placement courses.

Area residents believed that HISD wanted to acquire two more apartment complexes to further expand Westbury, and HISD officials told area residents that they planned to acquire the Westbury Manor Apartments. By 2014 they discovered that the 2012 bond did not specify purchasing additional complexes; residents started an online petition to ask HISD to acquire those complexes. In January 2015 HISD board members rejected acquiring the Westbury Manor Apartments.

Jason Catchings became the principal of Westbury in the 2014–2015 school year; He had served as the principal of Scarborough High School for a three-year period.

As part of the 2012 bond, the school was scheduled to have a $48 million renovation, to be completed in 2018.

In April 2015, an HISD spokesperson stated that the district was investigating an incident in which a substitute teacher was asked to pass all students with grades of 80 or above. An HISD report stated that Catchings was responsible for the order, and the district reassigned him while the district's director of high schools, Justin Fuentes, temporarily took Catchings's position. The HISD board fired Catchings, who planned to file an appeal. Catchings was replaced by Susan Monaghan, who had been the principal of Pin Oak Middle School.

== Neighborhoods served by Westbury ==
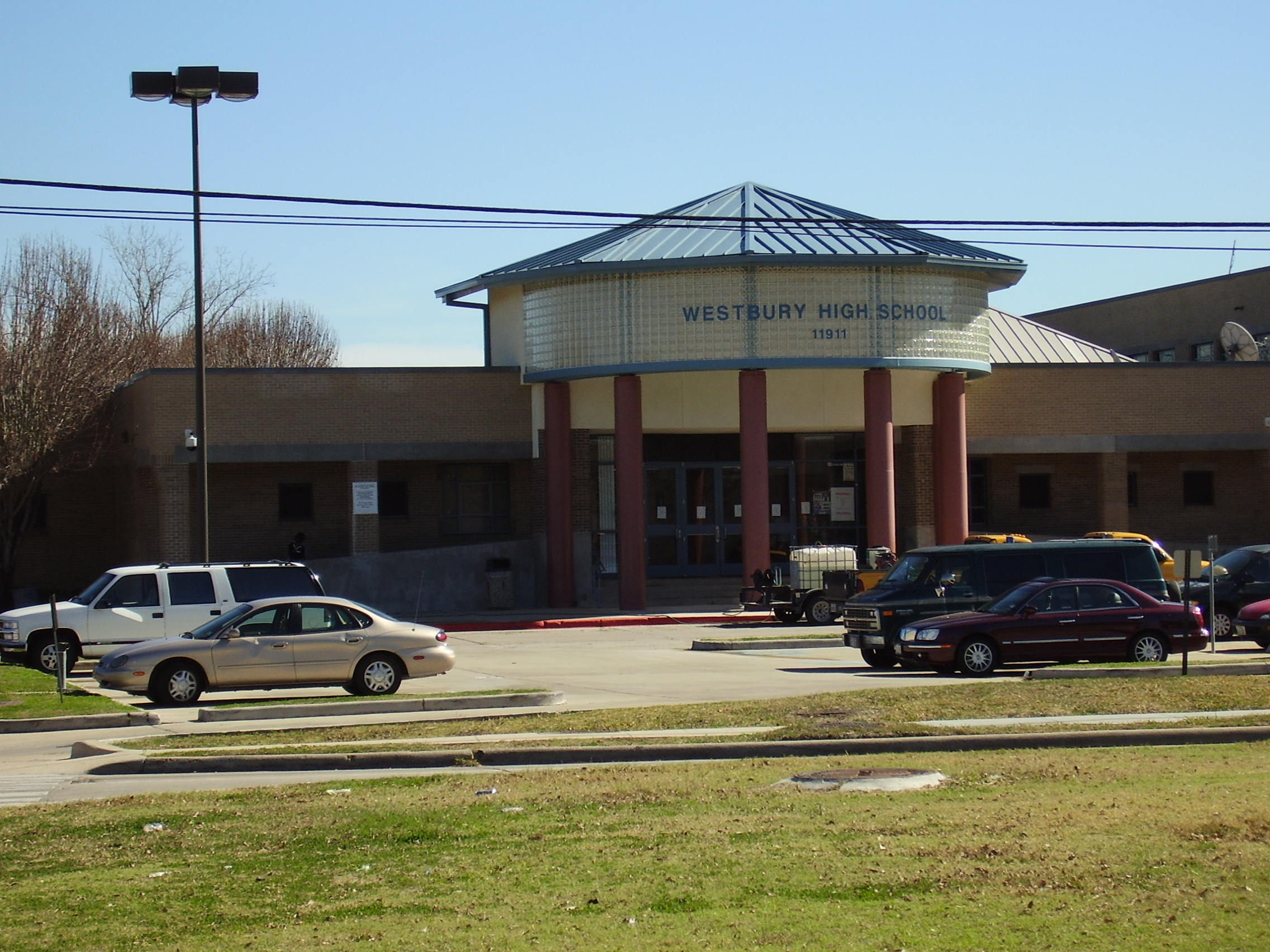
Westbury High School

Areas zoned to Westbury High include:

Many neighborhoods in southwest Houston, including almost all of Westbury, Post Oak Manor, Marilyn Estates, Willowbend, most of Willow Meadows, Glenshire, Parkwest, Maplewood South, about half of the Westwood subdivision, and parts of Brays Oaks (Fondren Southwest), as well as the Harris County portion of the city of Missouri City.

In 1970 the Westwood subdivision, along with some other White communities, was rezoned from Westbury to Madison High School because of a court ruling. By 1990, Westbury was about 50% Black, 25% White, 15% Hispanic, and 10% Asian, while Madison was 1% White. In 1992 an attendance boundary shift occurred but Westwood was still in the Madison zone. The Westwood community advocated for a rezoning to Westbury, and after the community gave a presentation to the HISD board, the board unanimously rezoned the community to Westbury.

As of 2006 many middle and upper class residents of the Westbury attendance zone do not send their children to Westbury; usually they send their children to Bellaire High School, Lamar High School, or private schools.

== Mascot ==
In April 2014, the HISD school board decided to rename remaining sports team names of Confederate and Native American mascots to be more culturally sensitive. Each school submitted its main choices to the HISD administration. The first nickname choice for the Westbury students was the "Huskies", replacing the "Rebels".

Initially the mascot was the Rebel, a reference to the Confederate States of America. By 2007 the school had already stopped using much imagery from the Confederacy.

== Academic performance ==
In 2009, the school's graduation rate was 67.4%. In 2012 it increased to 82.8%.

== Dress code ==
As of 2015, the standard mode of dress (school uniform) for Westbury High School students is as follows:

- Shirts: Solid colored polo styled shirts only (freshmen - white, sophomores, juniors, and seniors - light grey or royal blue).
- Pants: Khaki slacks, or blue jeans (no cargo pants, leggings, or tights).

The standard dress was first established by principal Ivy Levingston. According to an article in the Houston Chronicle, the dress code was intended to prevent "gang-affiliated colors" from being a presence in the school.

The Texas Education Agency specified that the parents and/or guardians of students zoned to a school with uniforms may apply for a waiver to opt out of the uniform policy so their children do not have to wear the uniform; parents must specify "bona fide" reasons, such as religious reasons or philosophical objections.

== Feeder patterns ==
Elementary schools that feed into Westbury include Anderson, Elrod, Foerster, Gross, Parker, Bell (partial), Kolter (partial), Milne (partial), Red (partial), Shearn (partial), and Valley West (partial).

Middle schools that feed into Westbury include Fondren (partial), Meyerland Performing and Visual Arts (formerly Johnston) (partial), Pershing (partial), and Welch (partial).

All pupils zoned to Meyerland Middle, Pershing, and Long Middle Schools may apply to attend Pin Oak Middle School; therefore, Pin Oak also feeds into Westbury High School.

== Notable alumni ==
- Bennie Brazell, 2004 Olympic Games finalist in the 400 meter hurdles and former NFL wide receiver for the Cincinnati Bengals
- Rusty Clark, former CFL quarterback for the Edmonton Eskimos and BC Lions
- Chris Cunningham, former CFL wide receiver for the Toronto Argonauts
- Dave Elmendorf, former NFL safety for the Los Angeles Rams
- Edwin Harrison, current CFL offensive lineman for the Calgary Stampeders
- Bayano Kamani, twice Olympian and Panamanian hurdler
- Brian McBride, musician, member of the ambient duo Stars of the Lid
- Anthony Oakley, former NFL offensive guard
- Brodney Pool, former NFL safety
- Joan Severance, actress and former fashion model
- Charles Sims, former NFL running back for the Tampa Bay Buccaneers
- Michael Strahan, former NFL defensive end for the New York Giants (graduated from another school)
- Ayana Walker, former WNBA basketball player for the Detroit Shock
- Shannon Walker, scientist and NASA astronaut
- Kevon Williams, rugby player for the USA 7s
