= Glenshire, Houston =

Human settlement in Houston, Texas, United States of America

Glenshire is a subdivision in the Brays Oaks district in Houston, Texas. The community is in proximity to Fort Bend County. In 1989 the community had about 5,000 residents. R.A. Dyer and Claire Osborn of the Houston Chronicle said in 1989 that Glenshire was "a middle-class residential area".

Glenshire is bound by West Bellfort to the north, West Airport to the south, Keegan's Bayou to the west, and Riceville School Rd to the east. It is split by Beltway 8.

== History ==
Glenshire was built from 1972 to 1976. In the 1960s, prior to the development of Glenshire, the State of Texas had acquired the right of way to construct Beltway 8 in the area.

In 1989 residents of Glenshire said they would sue the State of Texas over the construction of Beltway 8. Bill Hill, the Glenshire Community Association president, threatened to file an injunction if the state did not address the concerns that Glenshire residents had. The residents wanted better access between the two halves of the subdivision that the Beltway would form.

In 1990 Glenshire obtained a court order that halted the construction of a 1-mile (1.6 km) portion of West Airport Boulevard between Riceville School Road and a Beltway 8 path. The residents feared that noise and volume of high speed traffic could affect the neighborhood, and they said that there was inadequate notice was given for public input. The U.S. Government federal law required public notice because the Texas Department of Highways and Public Transportation was building the project with federal funds.

As of 1991, over 90% of residents participated in the city's curbside recycling program. One resident, Patti Niswanger, had organized a 75-person neighborhood committee that encourages residents to recycle.

As of 1996, the portion of Beltway 8 south of Interstate 69/U.S. Route 59 was being built, increasing Glenshire's road access. Frank Lucco, a real estate appraiser quoted by Katherine Feser in the Houston Chronicle was paraphrased by Feser as saying "While homes that back directly to the beltway will probably be hurt in value, improved access to the city should help overall property values." A sound wall was to be constructed to back up against houses adjacent to the Beltway. For the portion north of Beltway 8, as of 1996, new development appearing in the area included a Cinemark Tinseltown, a Home Depot, hotels, and restaurants. In the article, some homeowners expressed concern about the development since some development which had declined was already in close proximity, and the residents did not desire any additional declined development.

As of 1996 many residents were moving internally within Glenshire so they could get larger houses for a relatively small amount of money. Patti Altman, an employee of Callager/Hamlin Realtors, said "People are moving from Glenshire west to Glenshire east again because they can't buy a house in the Sugar Land area for under $100,000 anymore." ($100,000 in 1996 money is $200488.01 in today's money)

== Cityscape ==
The community is the Brays Oaks district, and it is in proximity to Fort Bend County. The portion of Beltway 8 between Interstate 69/U.S. Route 59 (Southwest Freeway) and U.S. Highway 90A runs through Glenshire.

Katherine Feser of the Houston Chronicle said in 1996 that Glenshire "is lined with vacant land along the beltway, West Bellfort and West Airport" and is in proximity to "an area flooded with low-rent apartments and half-vacant retail centers."

As of that year, the larger houses are east of the Beltway while smaller houses are to the west of the Beltway. The houses east of the Beltway had a range of 2,000 square feet (190 m^{2}) to 3,000 square feet (280 m^{2}) while houses west of the Beltway had a range of 1,600 square feet (150 m^{2}) to 2,400 square feet (220 m^{2}). In 1996 the prices of houses east of the Beltway ranged from $85,000 ($170414.81 in today's currency) to $105,000 ($210512.41). The prices of houses west of the Beltway ranged from $69,000 ($138336.73) to $85,000 ($170414.81).

== Government and infrastructure ==
Glenshire is in Texas's 9th congressional district .

The neighborhood is within the Houston Police Department's Fondren Patrol Division.

== Education ==
Glenshire is within the Houston Independent School District. Kate Bell Elementary School, the zoned elementary school, is within Glenshire.

Zoned schools include:

- Bell Elementary School
- Welch Middle School
- Westbury High School

== Parks and recreation ==
As of 1996, Glenshire has recreational facilities on both sides of Beltway 8. Recreational facilities located on each side of the Beltway include pools and tennis courts.

The community previously had some soccer (football) and baseball/softball fields that were razed so that two three-lane access feeder roads to Beltway 8 would be constructed. In 1989 the Texas Department of Highways and Public Transportation awarded an $11.5 million contract to build the access lanes. Bill Hill, the president of the Glenshire Community Association, said in 1989 that residents were not informed about this development and felt resentment.
