= Robert M. Beren Academy =

Jewish private school in Houston, Texas

Coordinates: 29.6541°N 95.4522°W

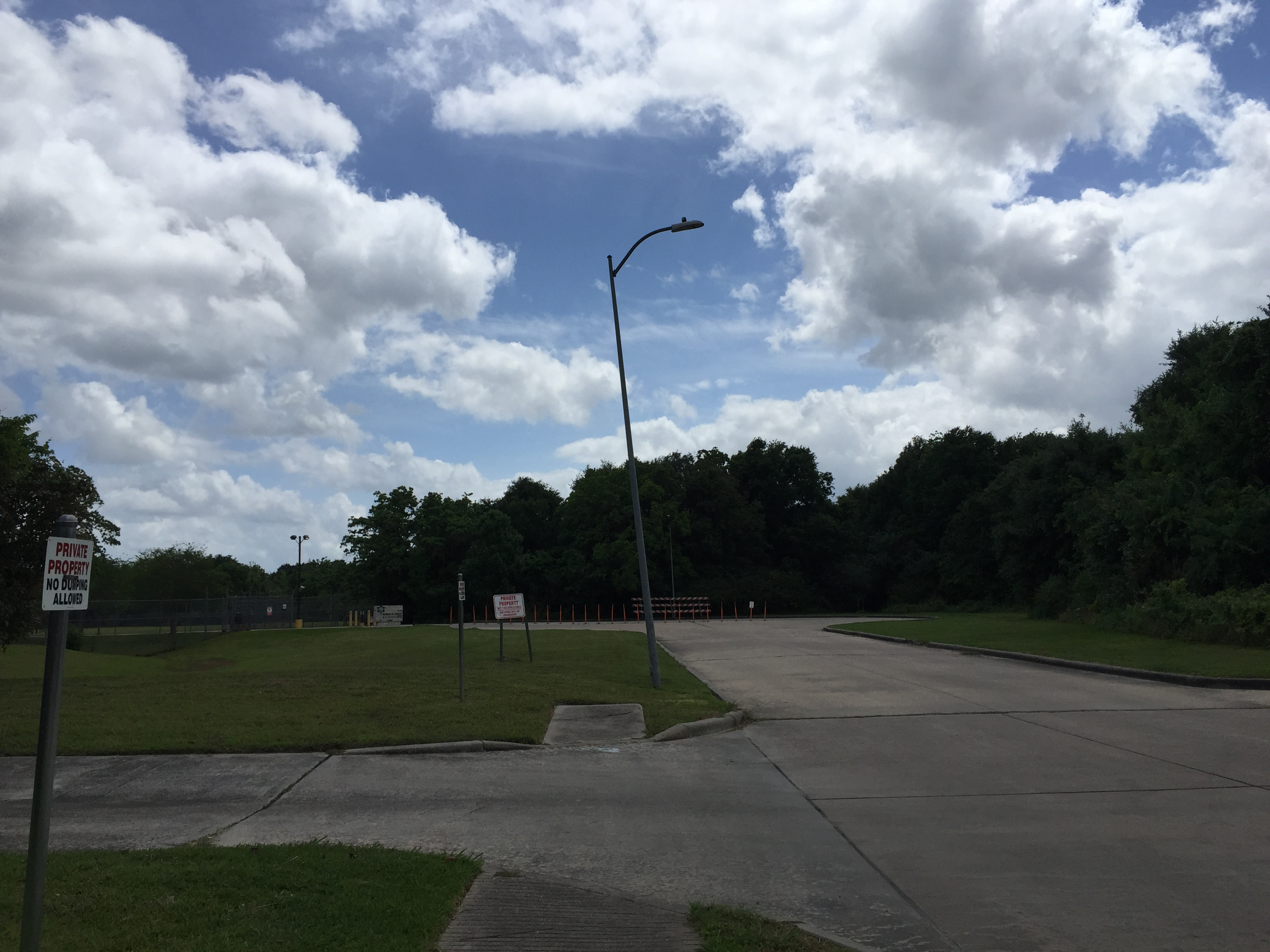
Main entrance

Robert M. Beren Academy is a private Modern Orthodox Jewish primary and secondary school at 11333 Cliffwood Drive in Houston, Texas, United States.

Robert M. Beren Academy is located near the Willow Meadows and Willowbend neighborhoods. The school covers preschool through grade 12 and includes an elementary Montessori program.

The school, previously named Hebrew Academy, is an independent Jewish school. Roselyn Bell, author of the "Houston" entry in The Jewish Traveler: Hadassah Magazine's Guide to the World's Jewish Communities and Sights, wrote that the Hebrew Academy has "Orthodox leanings".

It is affiliated with Yeshiva University in New York City.

== History ==
Robert M. Beren Academy was founded in 1969 as the South Texas Hebrew Academy; the original campus was located at South Braeswood at Chimney Rock. In 1980, the school was renamed Hebrew Academy. In 1988, the school was again renamed to Robert M. Beren Academy after the Israel Henry Beren Foundation donated to the school.

After a six million-dollar capital campaign, the school moved into its 54,000-square-foot (5,000 m^{2}) campus at 11333 Cliffwood in 1999.

In 2007 Robert M. Beren, whom the school was named after, donated $1 million to the school. Other individuals donated another $1 million at the same time.

In February 2012, Beren Academy's boys basketball team reached the semifinals of the Texas Association of Private and Parochial Schools (TAPPS) state tournament, but withdrew from the semifinal game, which had been scheduled for Friday evening during the Jewish Sabbath, after TAPPS refused the school's request to reschedule the game for earlier in the day. However, after some of the parents of the team members filed a lawsuit in a Dallas court, TAPPS relented and granted them the opportunity to reschedule the game. Beren won the rescheduled semifinal game, but lost in the state championship.

In Fall 2012, Rabbi Perry Tirschwell assumed the position of Executive Director. Rabbi Jordan Silvestri is the current head of school.

== Student body and operations ==
As of 2006 it had 270 students; As of 2008 the school had 325 students. Annual tuition in 2008 ranged from $11,000 to $15,000. Though the school is an Orthodox Jewish institution, about 40% of families do not self-identify as Orthodox. The Orthodox families live in a very tight-knit community, all within walking distance to the Synagogue. There is a strong emphasis placed on family and community. 70% of RMBA graduates choose to spend a gap year continuing their Judaic studies in Israel before beginning college. 10% of RMBA graduates attend Ivy League universities. The high school faculty consists of 23 educators, 17 of whom hold advanced degrees.

== Curriculum and academic achievement ==
The students have standard curricula, Hebrew language courses, and Judaic studies.

As of 2006 the percentage of students who achieved National Merit Scholar status was 15%, and the school's average SAT score was 1279.

In 2005 the school's board installed a Montessori program. One year later, 16 students in grades 1-3 participated in it.

== Programs ==
In January 2009 Beren was scheduled to start a pilot program, Yad B'Yad ("Hand in Hand"), in which students with disabilities are mainstreamed into the student body by attending classes every week, with 90 minutes per week.

== Notable alumni ==
- Mindy Finn
- Rabbi Shlomo Brody

== See also ==
- History of the Jews in Houston
