= Rusty Clark =

American gridiron football player (1943–2022)

No. 10
- Position: Quarterback

Personal information
- Born: February 4, 1947; Edinburg, Texas, U.S.
- Died: March 23, 2022 (aged 75); Katy, Texas. U.S.
- Listed height: 6 ft 2 in (1.88 m)
- Listed weight: 215 lb (98 kg)

Career information
- High school: Westbury (Houston, Texas)
- College: Baylor; Houston
- NFL draft: 1970: 6th round, 138th overall pick

Career history
- Edmonton Eskimos (1970–1971); BC Lions (1971)

Howard Russell "Rusty" Clark, Jr. (February 4, 1947 – March 23, 2022) was an American-born Canadian football player who played for the Edmonton Eskimos and BC Lions. He played college football at Baylor University and the University of Houston.

Clark died on March 23, 2022, in Katy, Texas, at the age of 75.
