= Willowbend, Houston =

Neighborhood in Houston, Texas

Coordinates: 29.6655°N 95.4510°W

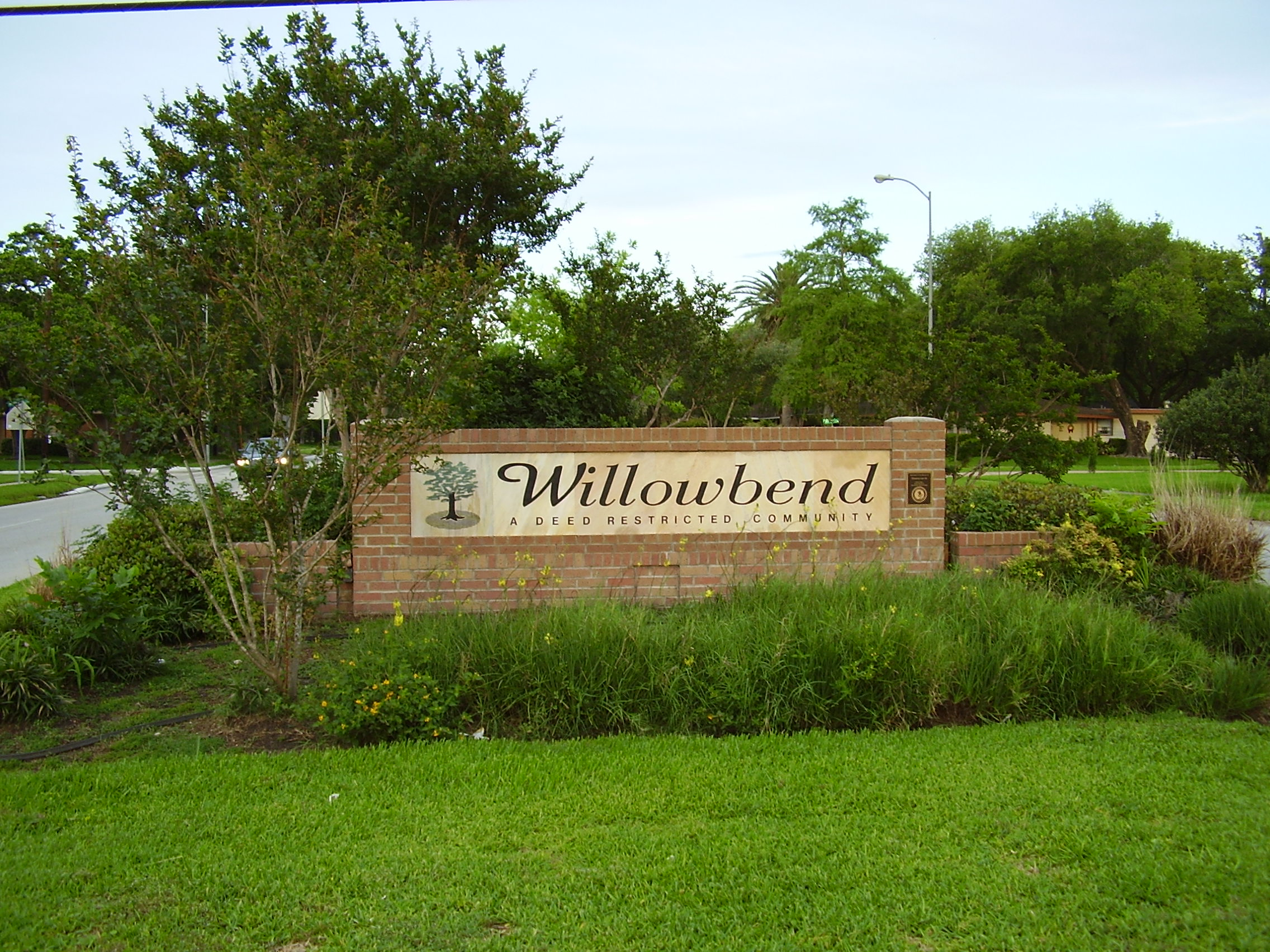
Signage in median at entrance into Willowbend neighborhood.

Willowbend is a neighborhood in near Southwest Houston, Texas.

Willowbend is just outside the 610 Loop and inside Beltway 8. The neighborhood is bound by the following streets: S. Post Oak Road to the West, Greenwillow Drive to the East, Briarbend Drive to the South, and Hazelton Street to North. The subdivision's main thoroughfare is Willowbend Boulevard with its center point at Willowbend and Cliffwood. Surrounding neighborhoods, include: Willow Meadows to the North, Meyerland to the Northwest, Westbury to the West. Willowbend is surrounded by numerous points of interest, including: Willow Waterhole Park, Meyerland Plaza, The Texas Medical Center, and NRG Stadium.

== History ==
Willowbend is a comfortable upper middle-class residential neighborhood in southwest Houston, Texas. It has become a highly desirable neighborhood due to its low crime rate, friendly residents, and proximity downtown Houston, the Texas Medical Center, and the Interstate 610 loop. The neighborhood has hosted a number of youth sports programs such as the Willow Creek Little League, FUN Football Raiders, or Red Raiders. Many athletes got their start in these youth leagues.

The eastern and southern sides of the neighborhood are bounded a large field which forms a buffer between the railroad tracks and Willowbend homes. This large field is a unique and attractive feature of the neighborhood as it features horses, cows, jack rabbits, turtles, crawfish, natural ponds, snakes, and other wildlife. Many children have enjoyed the opportunity to explore the land and learn about animals and nature while surrounded by Houston's vibrant metropolitan region.

Willow Water Hole is also located adjacent to the neighborhood to the south along South Post Oak Boulevard. Willow Water Hole hosts regular nature-oriented events as well as an award-winning annual music festival.

Willow Creek is a bayou that runs through the neighborhood. Willow Creek empties into the larger Braes Bayou. During Hurricane Harvey, some houses near the creek sustained substantial flooding, necessitating remediation and repairs. Some damaged homes were razed and replaced with new and larger residences.

In 1973, Willowbend was the site of attacks committed by Larry Delon Casey. Casey, upset about his father's death, gunned down three schoolgirls, a toddler, and an elderly woman and injured two others. Several of the victims were walking home from Red Elementary School when shot. Casey remains in prison for the murders, which occurred on Greenwillow, Willowilde, Benning, Creekbend streets and near the intersection of Cliffwood and Stillbrooke drives.

== Government and infrastructure ==
Willowbend is in Texas’ 9th congressional district as of the 2021 87th legislative session redistricting

Willowbend is in Houston City Council District K.

Harris Health System (formerly Harris County Hospital District) designated Valbona Health Center (formerly People's Health Center) in Greater Sharpstown for ZIP code 77035. The nearest public hospital is Ben Taub General Hospital in the Texas Medical Center.

== Education ==
=== Primary and secondary schools ===
==== Public schools ====
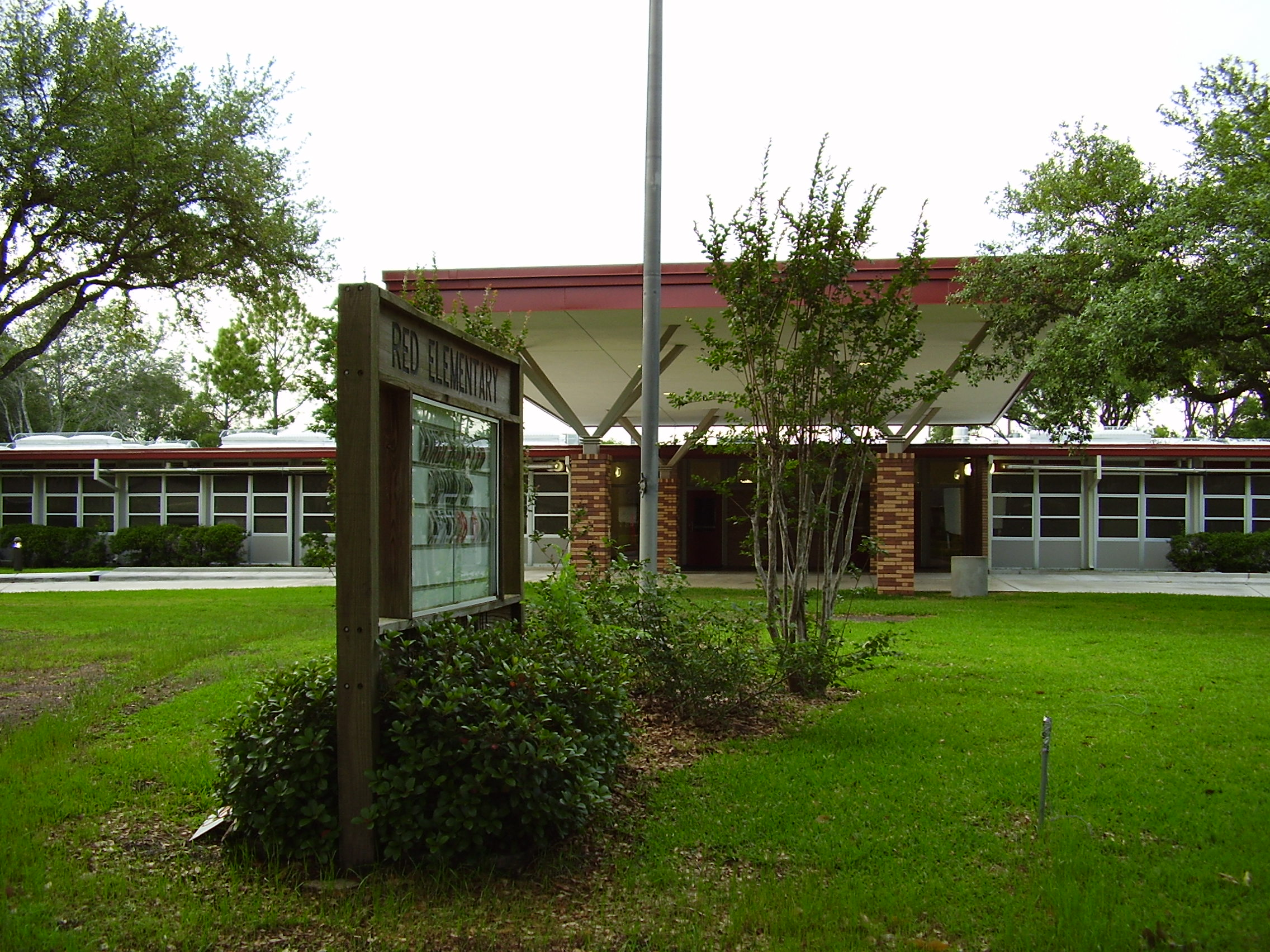
Red Elementary School

Willowbend residents are zoned to the following Houston ISD schools: Red Elementary School, Meyerland Performing and Visual Arts Middle School (formerly Johnston Middle School), and Westbury High School. Meyerland Middle-zoned residents may attend Pin Oak Middle School.

Red Elementary School is located in Willowbend Section 4. Named after doctor Samuel Clark Red, it opened in 1957. It received a magnet program in mathematics, science, and technology, converted into a full STEM magnet in 2012. Circa 2019 it had about 600 students.

==== Private schools ====
The Robert M. Beren Academy, a K-12 Judaic school, is located in the area .

Trafton Academy (Pre-K through 8) is also in the area. Ms. Wagner's School became the lower grades of Trafton Academy.

Trafton Academy is located in Willowbend Section 2.

The Emery/Weiner School is east of the subdivision bordering the Westwood subdivision.

=== Colleges and universities ===
Houston Community College System serves the neighborhood.

== Police service ==
The neighborhood is within the Houston Police Department's Southwest Patrol Division . Neighborhood residents also make yearly contributions for additional security patrols by off-duty police officers.

== Parks and recreation ==
Willow Park, a park operated by the City of Houston, is located at 10400 Cliffwood, adjacent to Red Elementary School . The large park features a playground, picnic facilities, a softball/soccer field, tennis courts and a small parking lot. It is the central spot of the neighborhood. A new sand volleyball court was added to the park in 2008. Across the street, there is a lovely neighborhood pool with verdant green lawns, plenty of shade trees and a world-class swim team (Willow Wahoos).

Willow Park is in Willow Meadows Section 3.

== Media ==
The Bellaire Texan, which served the Willowbend community in the mid-20th Century, was headquartered in Bellaire and published by the Texan Publishing Corporation. By 1975, it became known as the Bellaire & Southwestern Texan and was published by the Preston Publishing Company. It was then headquartered in Houston.
