= Willow Meadows, Houston =

Subdivision in Houston, Texas, United States

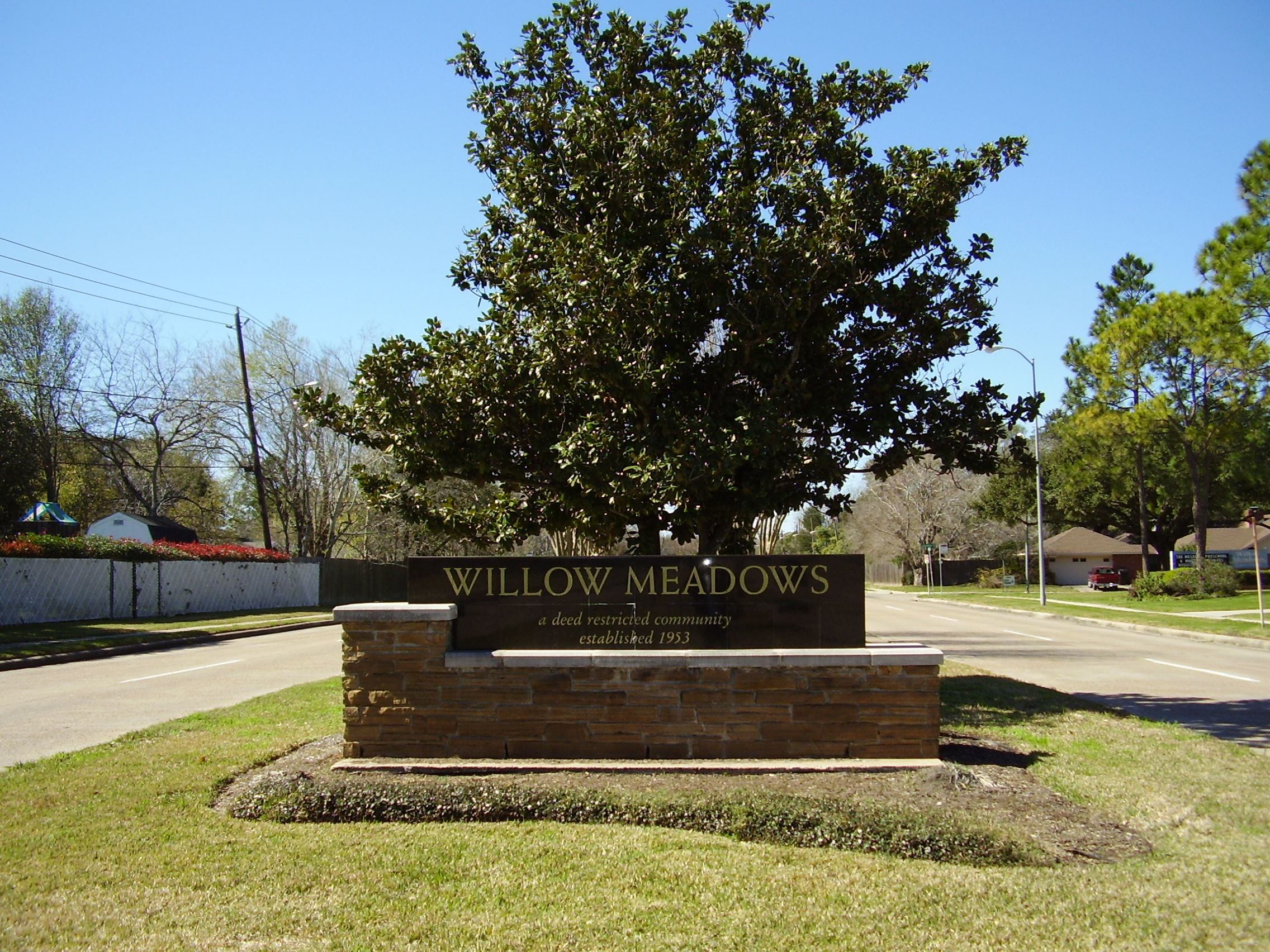
Willow Meadows

Willow Meadows is a subdivision in Houston, Texas, United States.

Willow Meadows straddles the southwest corner of 610 Loop, but lies fully inside Beltway 8. The subdivision is next to Meyer Park, a shopping center. Willow Meadows is east of Meyerland, north of Willowbend, west of Westwood, and south of the city of Bellaire.

The neighborhood consists of a handful of tree-lined streets. The homes are generally 50- to 60-year-old ranch style houses. Because of its relatively short commute time to the Texas Medical Center, Downtown Houston, and Uptown Houston, the neighborhood is home to mostly upper-middle class professionals and educators. The neighborhood does border Brays Bayou which occasionally floods the northern reaches of the subdivision. However, flooding levels throughout the neighborhood tend to be lower than surrounding neighborhoods.

Willow Meadows is in Texas's 7th congressional district.

== Education ==
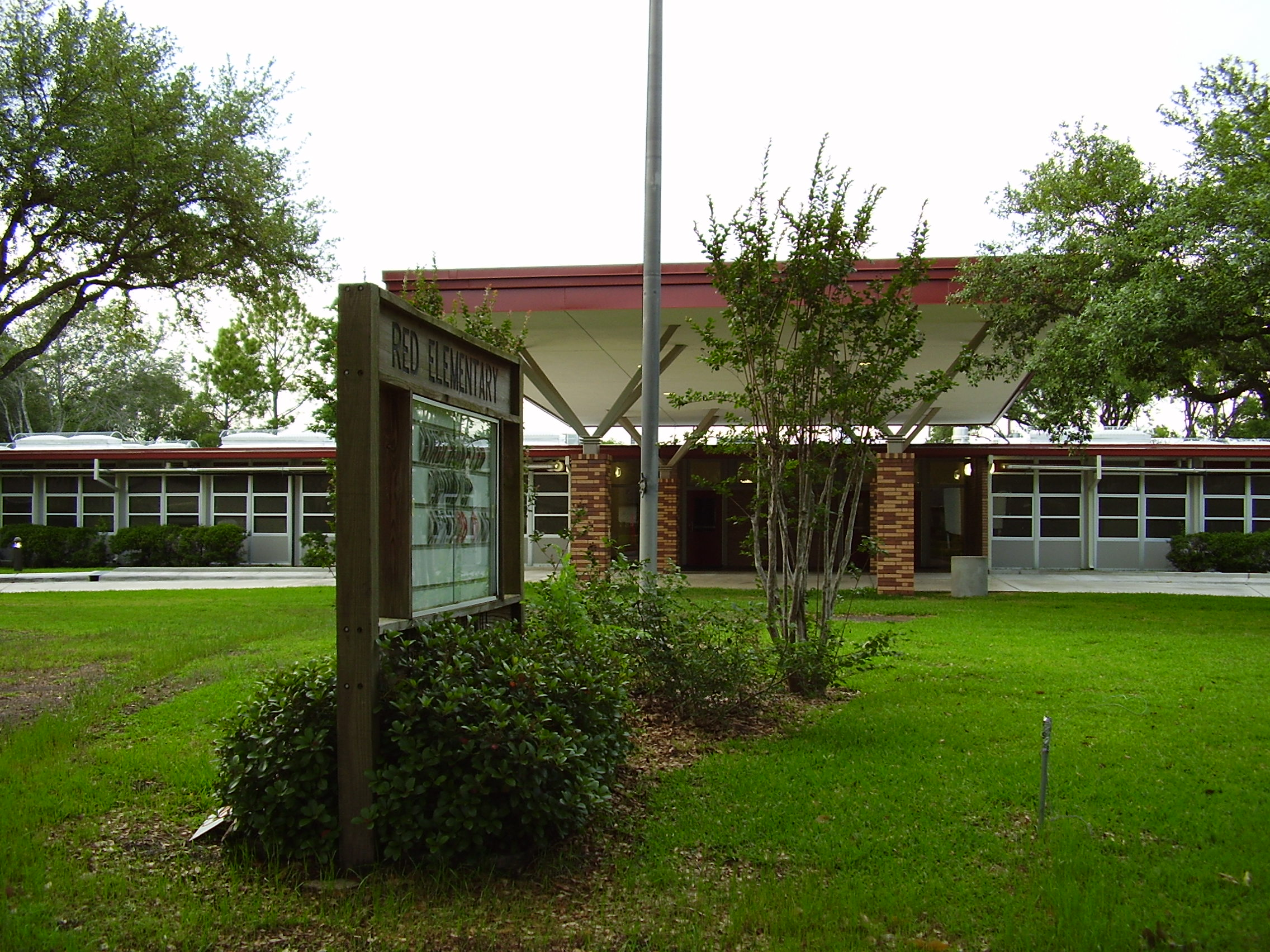
Red Elementary School in Willowbend

Willow Meadows is zoned to Houston ISD schools. All residents are zoned to Red Elementary School and Meyerland Performing and Visual Arts Middle School (formerly Johnston Middle School); Students zoned to Meyerland Performing Arts Middle School may attend Pin Oak Middle School in Bellaire instead. Residents north of West Bellfort are zoned to Bellaire High School (in Bellaire), while residents south of West Bellfort are zoned to Westbury High School.

Red Elementary is in Willowbend Section 4. Named after doctor Samuel Clark Red, it opened in 1957. It received a magnet program in mathematics, science, and technology, converted into a full STEM magnet in 2012. Circa 2019 it had about 600 students.

The Robert M. Beren Academy, a K-12 Judaic school, is located in the area .

Ms. Wagner's School and Trafton Academy are also in the area. Trafton Academy is located in Willowbend Section 2.

The Emery/Weiner School is east of the subdivision bordering the Westwood subdivision.

== Government and infrastructure ==
The neighborhood is within the Houston Police Department's Southwest Patrol Division .

Harris Health System (formerly Harris County Hospital District) designated Valbona Health Center (formerly People's Health Center) in Greater Sharpstown for ZIP code 77035. The nearest public hospital is Ben Taub General Hospital in the Texas Medical Center.

== Parks and recreation ==
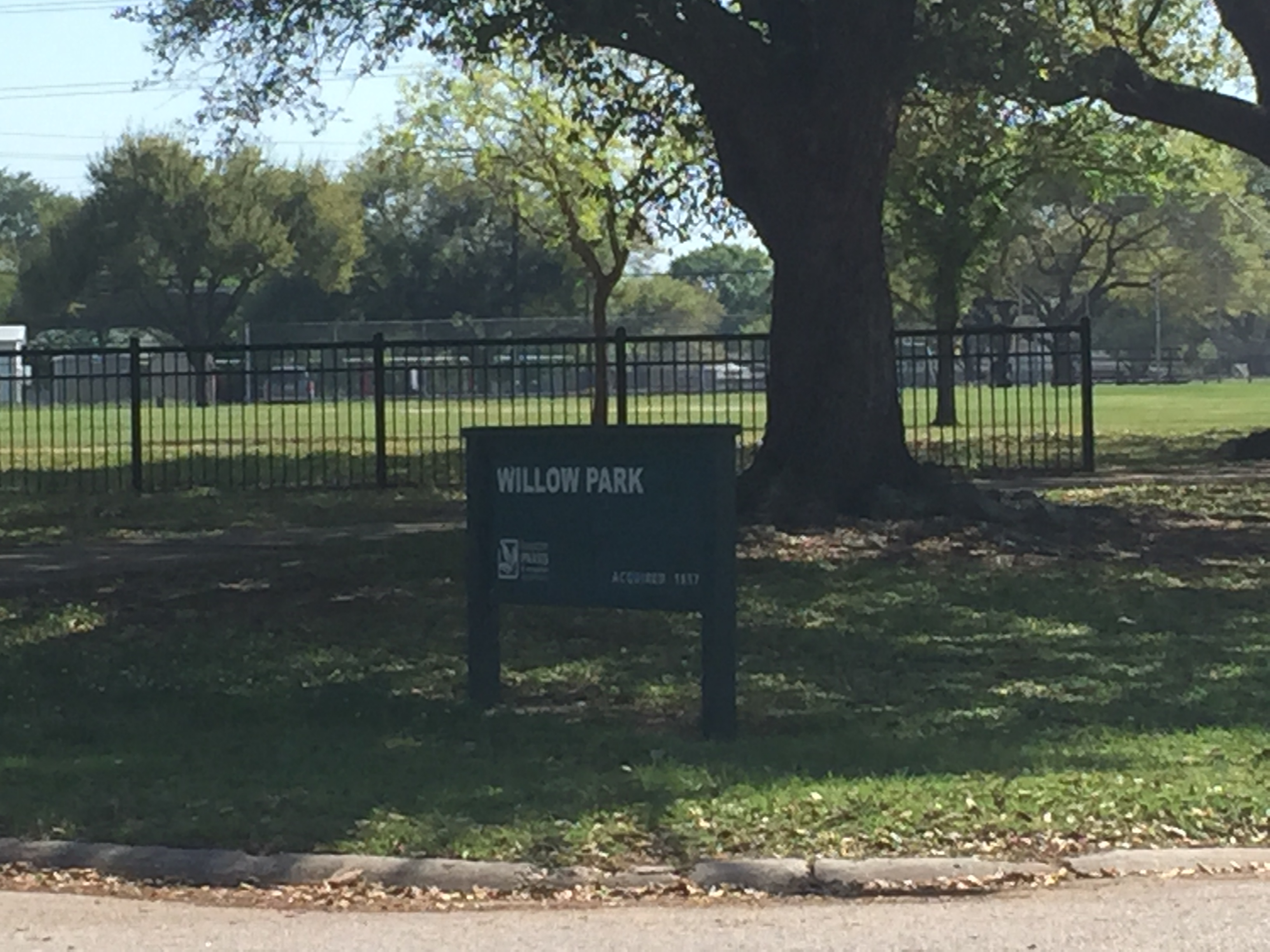
Willow Park in Willow Meadows

Willow Park, a park operated by the City of Houston, is located at 10400 Cliffwood, adjacent to Red Elementary School . Willow Park is in Willow Meadows Section 3.
