= Maplewood South–North, Houston =

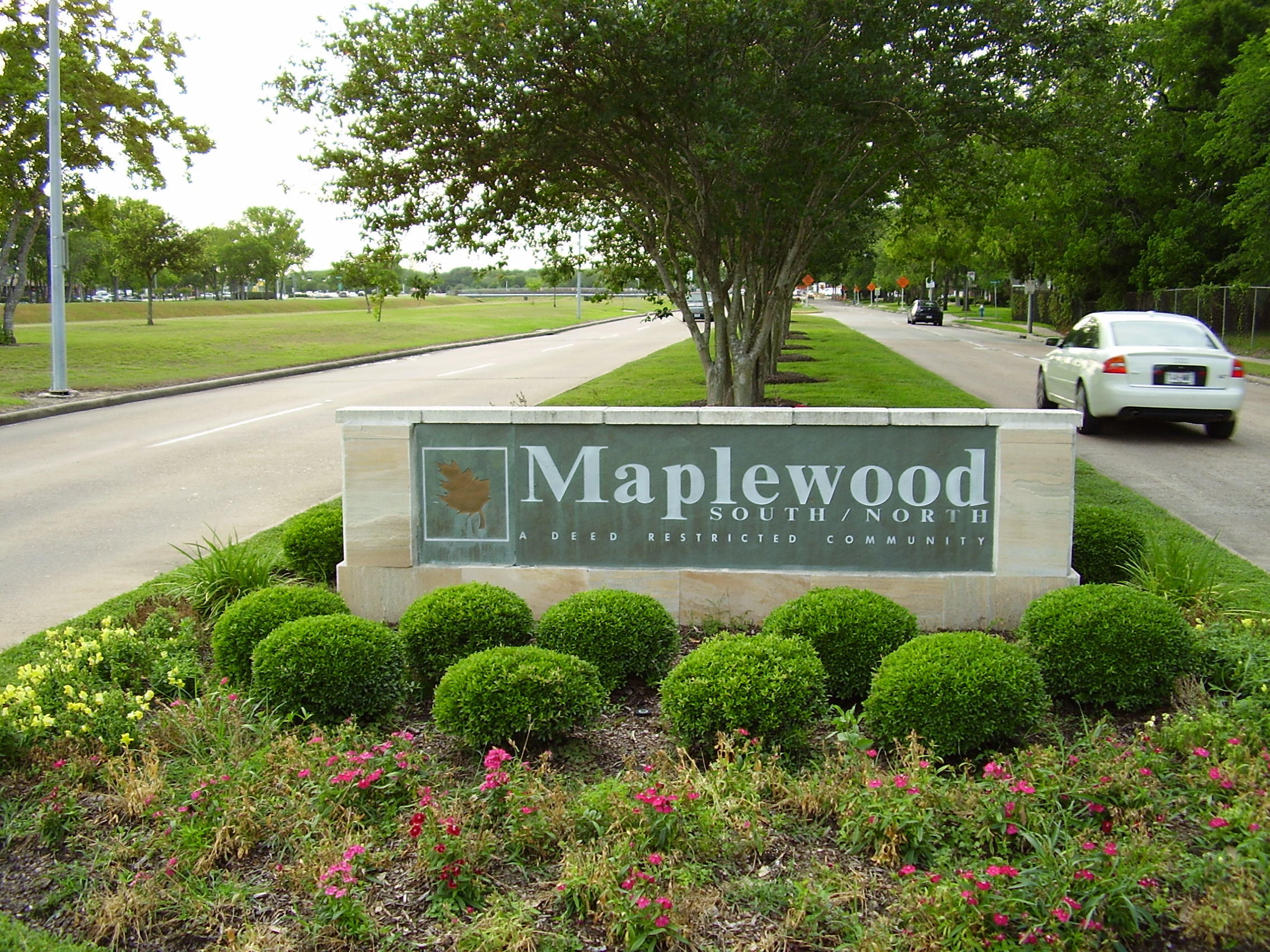
Maplewood/South North street sign along the Brays Bayou

Maplewood South/North is a group of subdivisions in Houston, Texas.

It is southwest of Downtown Houston and south of Uptown Houston.

In 2007 S.K. Bardwell of the Houston Chronicle said that Maplewood South "has one of the largest, most powerful civic associations in Houston, and its residents reap the benefits each year in increased property values."

The community has The MapleLeaf, the community newsletter.

== History ==
A group of investors platted Maplewood South/North. By Sunday May 2, 1965, Maplewood South was about 80% complete. At the time, all of the lots in the subdivision addition were owned by the builders.

== Composition ==
The homeowners association covers Maplewood South and Maplewood North.

Maplewood South is south of South Braeswood Boulevard and lies on both sides of Hillcroft Avenue. Maplewood South is in proximity to U.S. Route 59 (Southwest Freeway), which connects the subdivision to Downtown Houston. Maplewood South is in proximity to Bellaire, Meyerland, and Sharpstown.

When Maplewood South opened, houses were required to have at least 2,000 square feet (190 m^{2}) of living area. The Houston Post stated in 1965 that houses required "designs that blend with an overall community scheme."

== Government and infrastructure ==
The neighborhood is within the Houston Police Department's Southwest Patrol Division .

Maplewood South/North is in Texas's 7th congressional district .

Harris Health System (formerly Harris County Hospital District) designated Valbona Health Center (formerly People's Health Center) for ZIP code 77096. The nearest public hospital is Ben Taub General Hospital in the Texas Medical Center.

== Education ==
=== Primary and secondary schools ===
==== Public schools ====
Maplewood South/North is zoned to Houston ISD schools.

Maplewood North is zoned to Herod Elementary School, Fondren Middle School, and Bellaire High School.

Portions of Maplewood South west of Hillcroft (sections 6-8) are zoned to Horace W. Elrod Elementary School, Fondren Middle School, and Westbury High School. Portions of Maplewood South east of Hillcroft (sections 1-5) are zoned to either Parker or Herod Elementary Schools. All of Maplewood South east of Hillcroft is zoned to Meyerland Middle School (formerly Johnston Middle School), with Pin Oak Middle School as an option, and Westbury High School.

Elrod Elementary School is in Maplewood South Section 7.

Fondren Middle School, the Maplewood-area middle school, had a scheduled completion date in the northern hemisphere fall of 1965. Fondren was built in 1966.

==== Private schools ====
St. Thomas More Catholic School of the Roman Catholic Archdiocese of Galveston-Houston is located in Maplewood South Section 6. Many other private schools are in the area. The Schlenker School, an early childhood through 5th grade private school affiliated with Congregation Beth Israel, is adjacent to Maplewood North.

Also in the area is St. Vincent de Paul Catholic School, K-8.

== Parks and recreation ==
Maplewood South/North Family Recreational Park
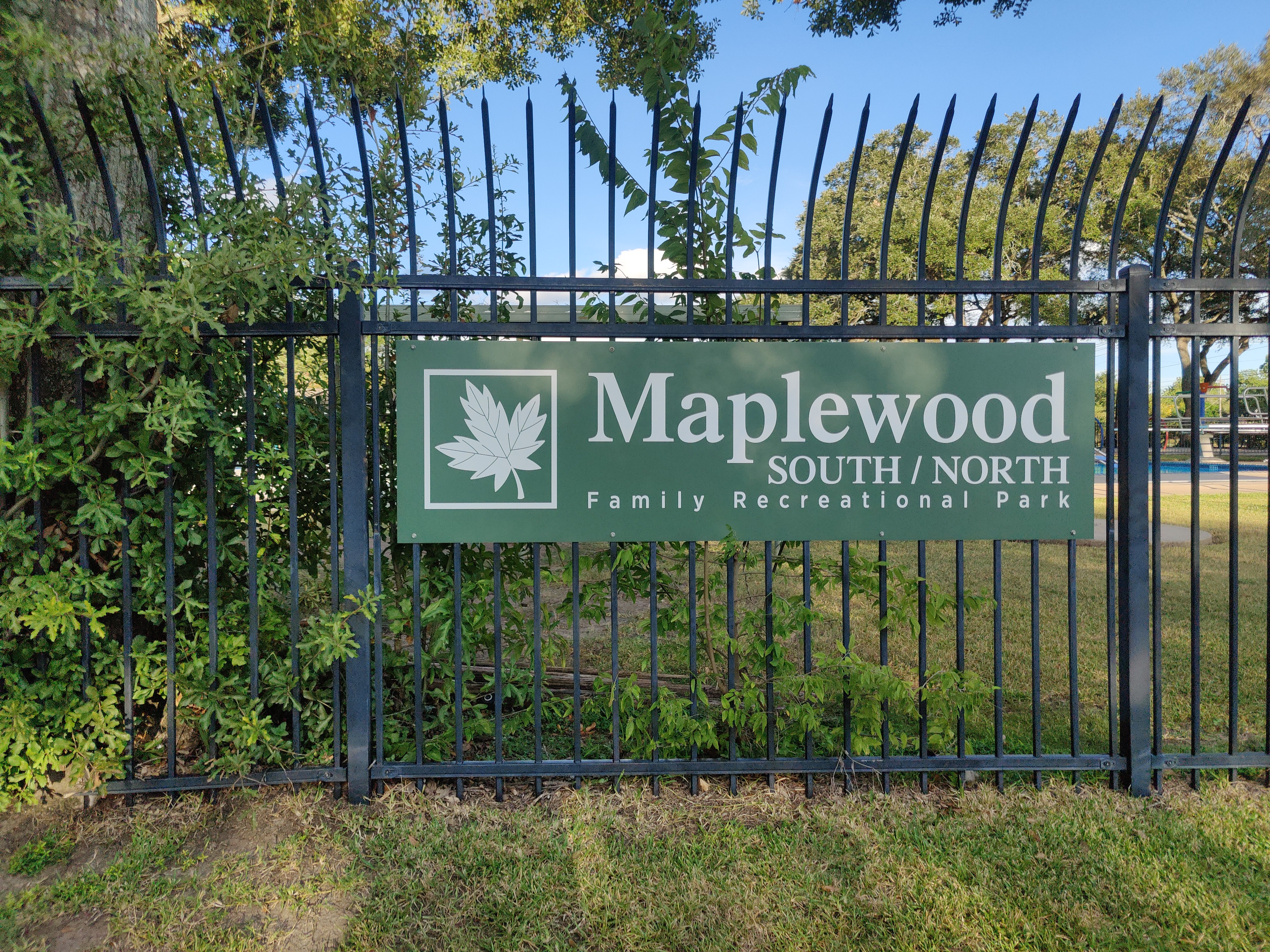
- The sign on the fence to the park
- Interactive map of Maplewood South/North Family Recreational Park
- Operator: Maplewood South/North Community Improvement Association

The subdivision group operates a pool and a park in a fenced in area called Maplewood South/North Family Recreational Park.

=== Ron Meek Park ===
The section inside of Maplewood South/North Family Recreational Park reserved for the playground and children to play in is named Ron Meek Park.

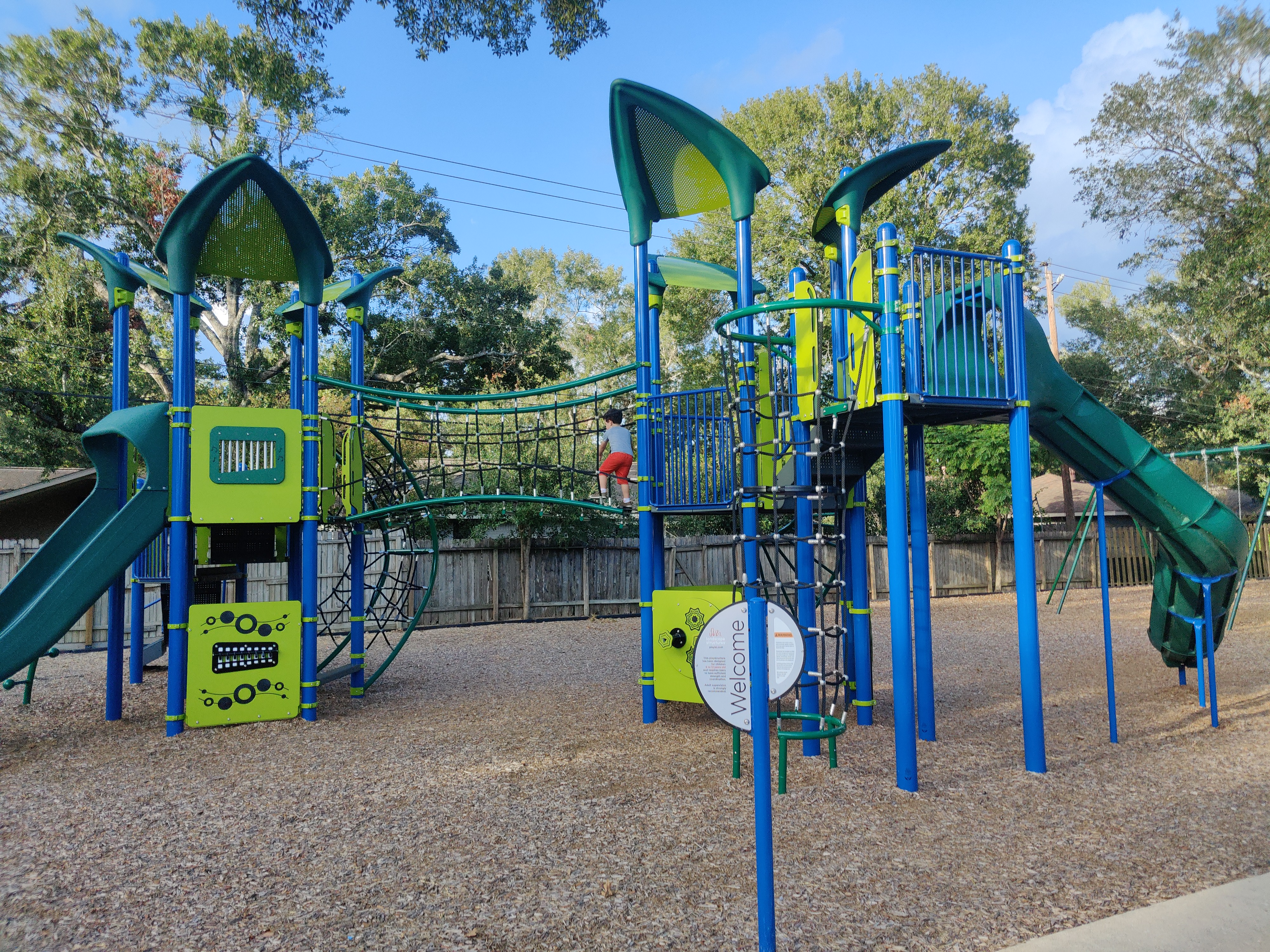
children's play structure

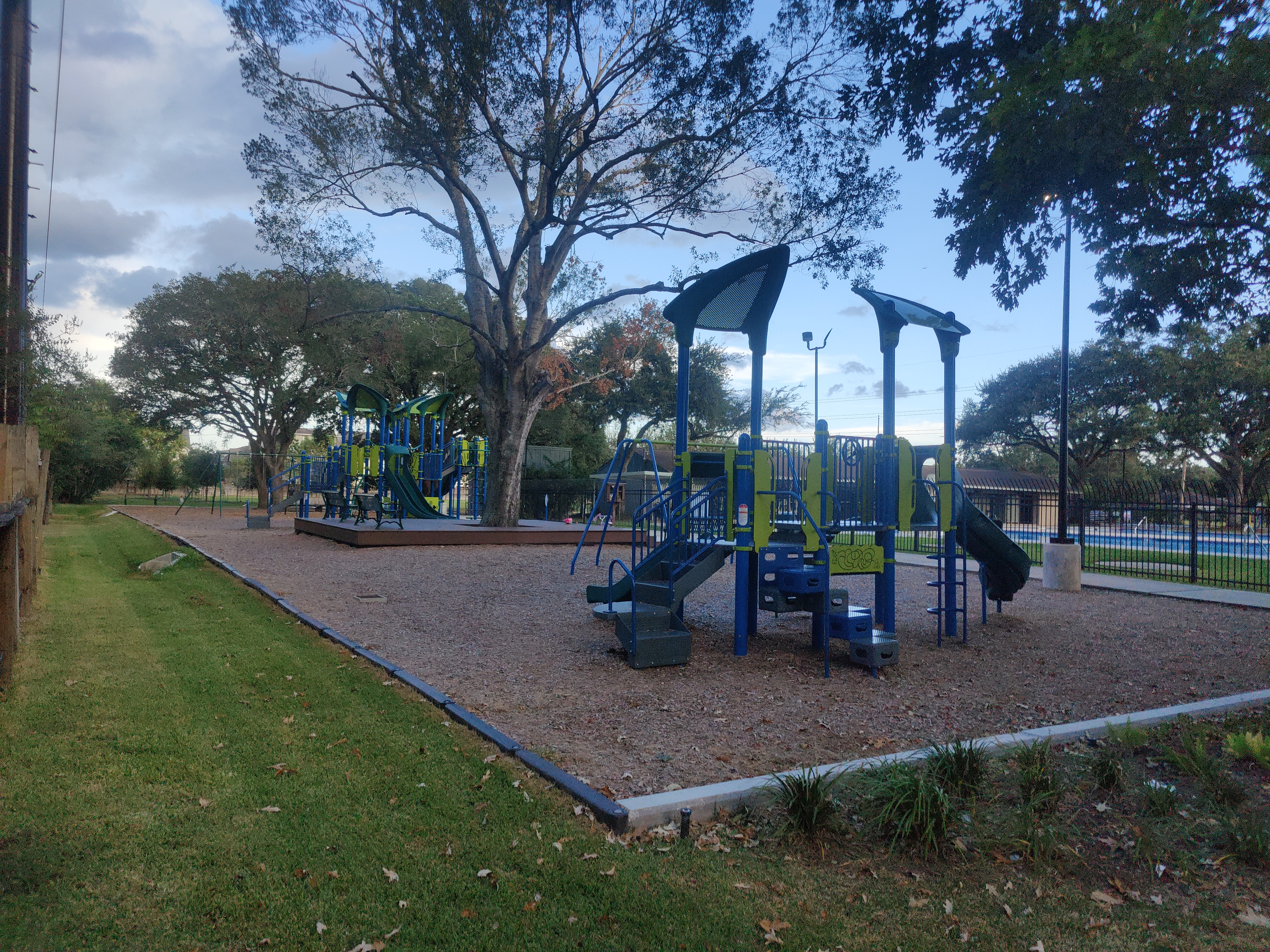
young-toddler play structure

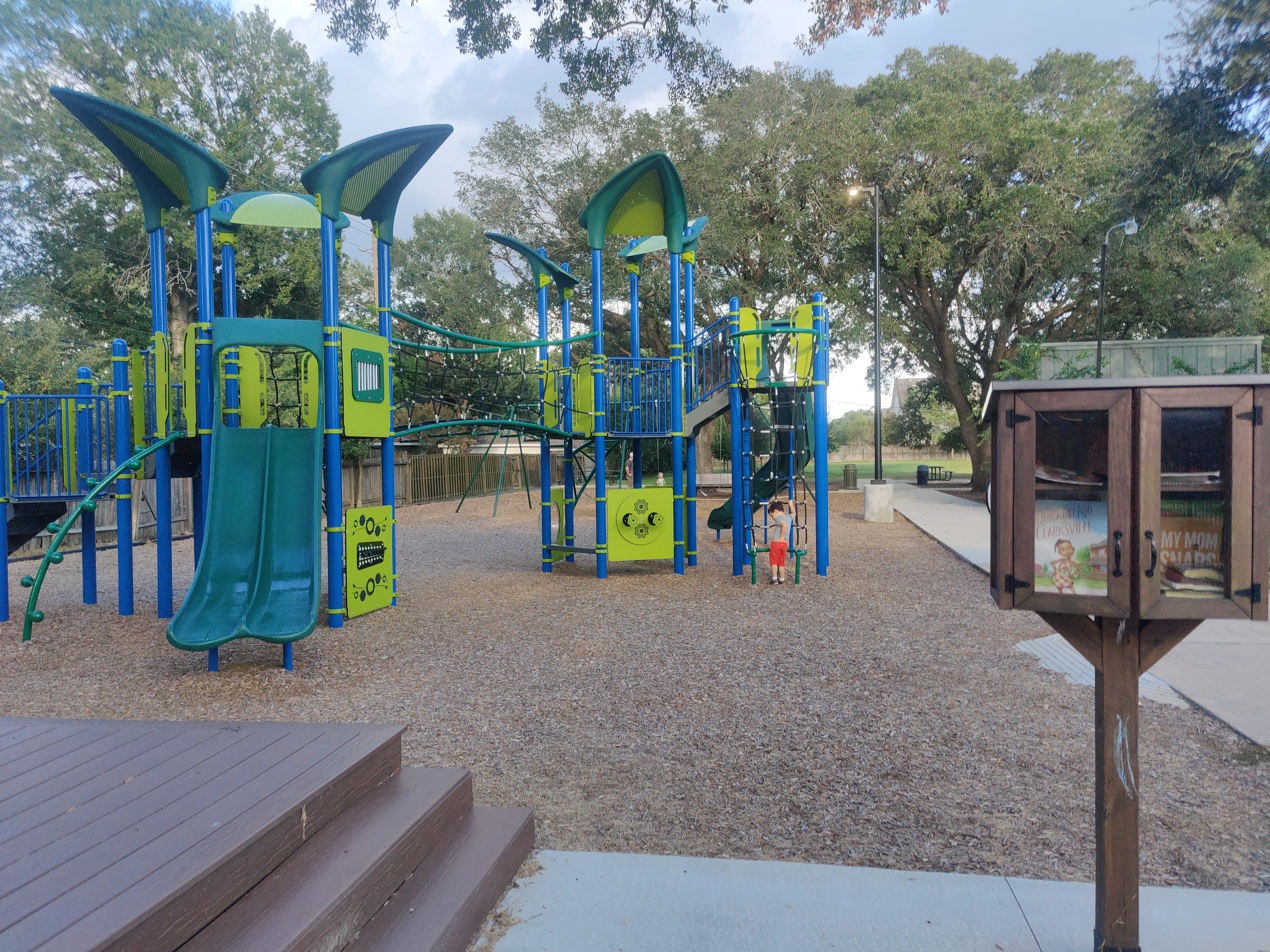
Little library

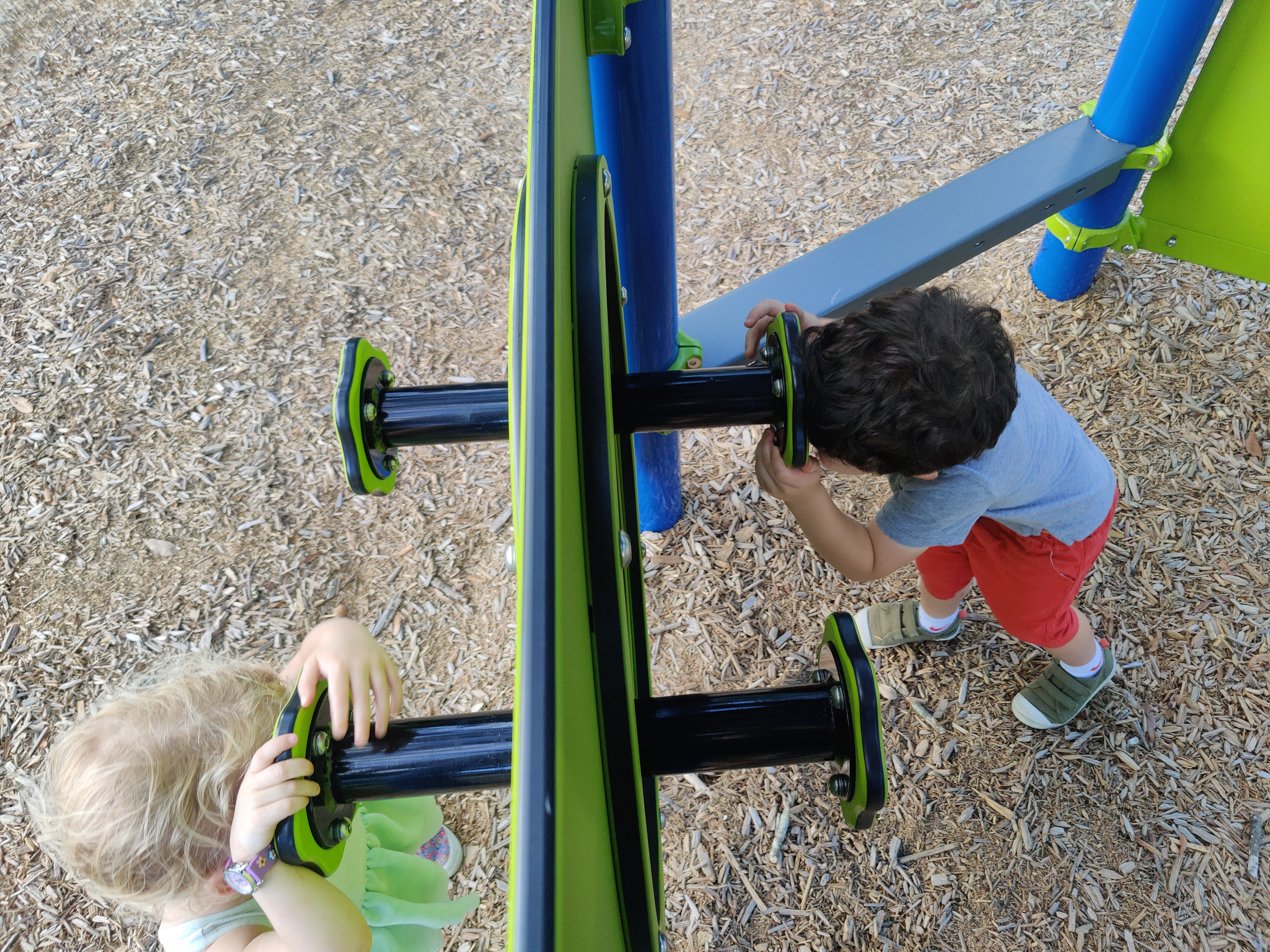
Children playing at Ron Meek Park

=== Lloyd Johnson Community Pool ===
Next to Ron Meek Park, and inside of the Maplewood South/North Family Recreational Park, is the Lloyd Johnson Community Pool. The community has a swim team, the Maplewood Marlins.
