= Changing Perspectives =

Non-fiction book

Changing Perspectives: Black-Jewish Relations in Houston during the Civil Rights Era is a 2021 non-fiction book by Allison E. Schottenstein, published by the University of North Texas Press.

The book argues that, in the mid-20th century, during the Civil rights movement, the Jewish population in Houston did not initially strongly, publicly advocate for African-American civil rights, while in other cities Jewish people had been an advocate for it. Hollace Ava Weiner of the Fort Worth Jewish Archives stated that many Jewish people in Houston at the time were "affluent" and "insecure", and did not want to face discrimination themselves. Marni Davis of Georgia State University stated that Houstonian Jewish people being of European descent had "general social acceptance and significant upward mobility", and they did not want to lose this. This dynamic changed in the 1960s, when Jewish people publicly asked for secularization of public schools.

== Background ==
The author attended Brandeis University for her undergraduate degree, and the University of Texas at Austin for her doctoral degree.

The author wanted to research the topic even when people whom she was in communication with told her that little material would be found. Shottenstein felt interest when she learned that the Congregation Beth Israel in Houston stated in 1943 that the congregation opposed Zionism and that its members were white. According to the author, the congregation was trying to ingratiate itself with non-Jewish white people so the members would not be discriminated against.

She also used Jewish Herald-Voice archives in her research.

She initially published a PhD thesis in 2017, then used it to make the final book.

In 2021 Shottenstein, now resident in Cincinnati, taught an online class for Gratz College that was a study of the Holocaust, and worked as a teacher at a private high school, giving U.S. history instruction.

== Contents ==
The book has eight chapters, not including its conclusion.

Timothy Riggio Quevillon of the University of Houston stated "While Houston’s Jews created a public perception that they accepted segregation laws, Schottenstein discusses how this was not always how community relations played out in private."

One chapter is about how Jewish people moved from Riverside Terrace to Meyerland. Weiner described it as "Among the most riveting chapters".

== Reception ==
Quevillon wrote that the book "is a welcome addition" with "accessibility" being "The biggest strength"

Weiner stated that the book is "a compelling, well-written, finely layered study"

The book won the Lynna Kay Shuffield Memorial Award in Texas Jewish History in 2022.

== See also ==
- History of African Americans in Houston
- History of the Jews in Houston
