= History of the Jews in Houston =

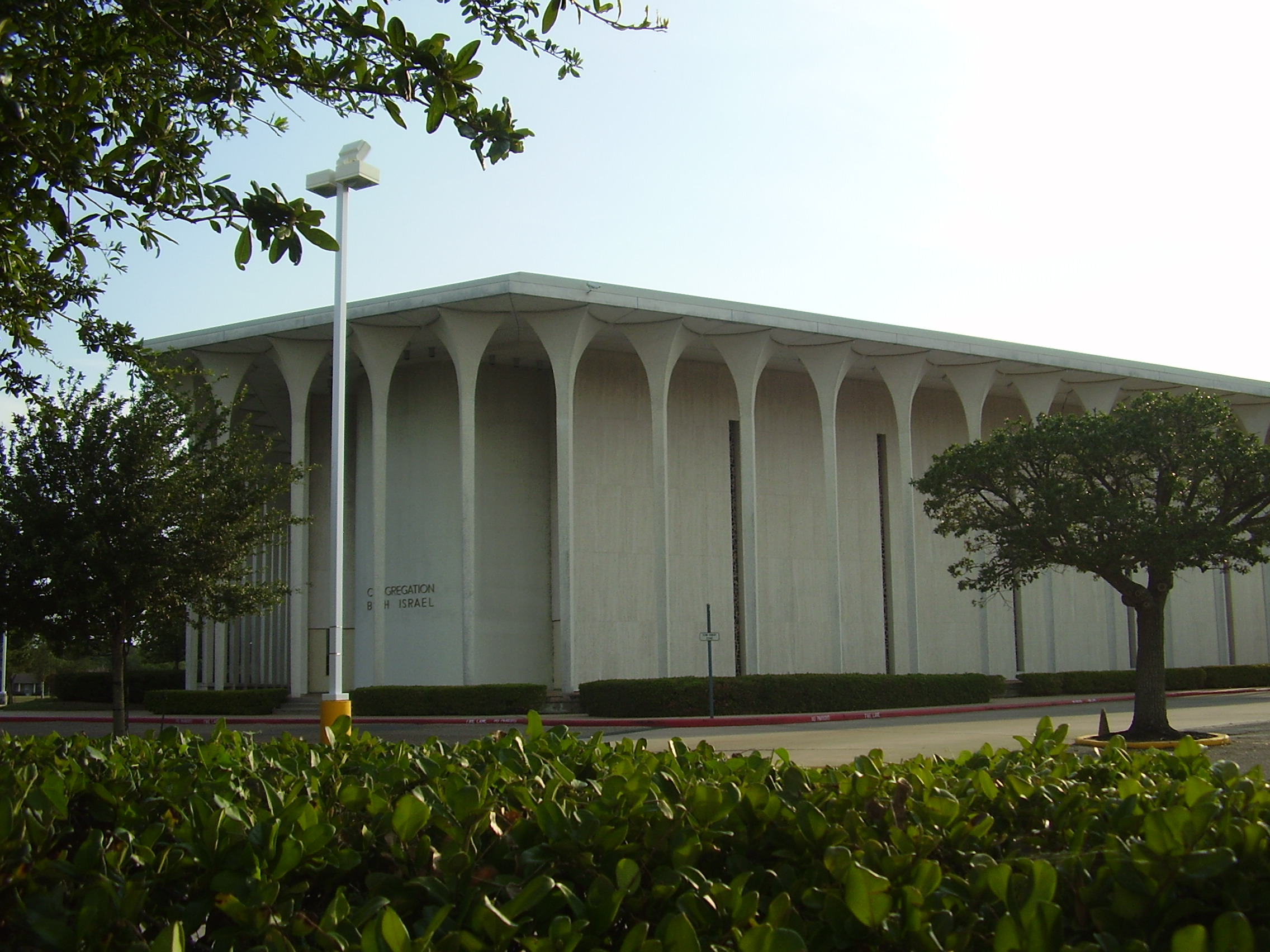
The current Congregation Beth Israel

The Jewish community of Houston has grown and thrived since the 1800s. As of 2008, Jews lived in many Houston neighborhoods and Meyerland is the center of the Jewish community in the area.

== History ==
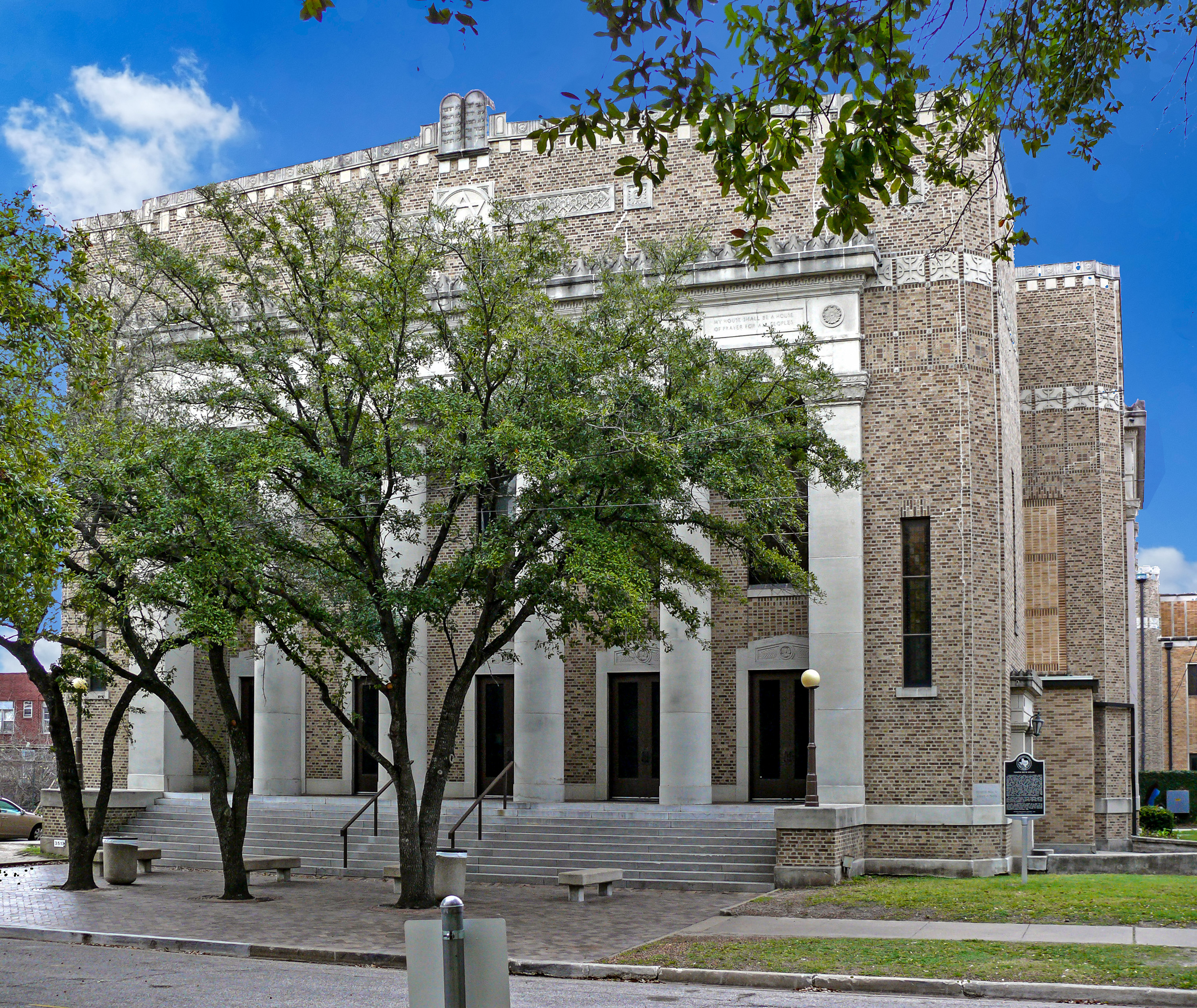
Previous Temple Beth Israel, now Heinen Theatre of the Houston Community College

Until 1880 Houston had a smaller Jewish population than Galveston Island, then the cultural center of the state. In 1844, the first Jewish cemetery in Houston was established. In 1850, the Jewish community in Houston had 17 adults and in 1854, the Orthodox Beth Israel Congregation opened in a former house that had been converted to a synagogue. By 1860 the number of Jewish adults grew to 68, and that year there were 40 Jewish children. In the 19th Century the Jewish population moved into the First and Second wards and later settled in the Third Ward.

Congregation Beth Israel was first established in a frame building on LaBranch Street near the Third Ward settlement. In the 19th Century the Franklin and Navigation area in the Fifth Ward and the area around Washington and Houston street in the Sixth Ward received Jewish settlers from Eastern Europe. As of around 1987 the areas in the historic Fifth and Sixth Wards no longer have significant Jewish populations. Roselyn Bell, author of the "Houston" entry in The Jewish Traveler: Hadassah Magazine's Guide to the World's Jewish Communities and Sights, wrote that the Houston Jewish community was "much more shtetl-like than it is today".

Beginning in 1880 many Eastern European Jews moved to Houston; they moved into wards two and three. They integrated with German Jews, differing from Eastern European Jews in the East Coast. Around that time the Russian-Polish Adath Yeshurun synagogue and the majority Galician Dorshe Tov synagogue, both Orthodox Jewish synagogues, had been founded. Adath Yeshurun merged into Congregation Adath Yeshurun in 1891. The Galveston Plan, an early 20th Century plan that called for sending Eastern European Jewish immigrants from heavily populated East Coast areas to less densely populated areas between the Mississippi River and the Rocky Mountains, sent many Jews to Houston. In 1903 a Zionist organization in Houston opened. In 1908 The Jewish Herald-Voice began publication. In 1915 a Jewish Workmen's Circle opened.

In the 1920s Jews began to settle in the Washington Terrace and later the Riverside Terrace areas in the current Third Ward area. Many Jewish institutions such as synagogues remained there until the end of the 1950s. Temple Beth Israel moved to the Riverside Terrace area in 1925 and Temple Beth Yeshurun opened in the same area in 1945. Jewish families moved to Riverside Terrace in the 1930s since they were not allowed to settle in River Oaks. Allison Wollam of the Houston Business Journal stated that, at one point, Riverside Terrace "was once on the same affluent level as the swanky River Oaks area". During that period the neighborhood hosted the houses of the prominent Weingarten, Finger, and McGregor families.

Around 1874 Beth Israel became a Reform Judaism synagogue. Congregation Beth El was founded in 1924. It was the first Conservative Judaism synagogue founded in Houston. In 1925 it occupied the former Beth Israel building. Adath Yeshurun later merged with Beth El and became Congregation Beth Yeshurun. In the 1930s many Jewish refugees from Germany moved to Houston. In 1943 Temple Beth Israel announced that people who espoused Zionist ideals were not allowed to be members, so Emanu-El was formed by people who disagreed with the decision. After World War II, more Jewish immigrants from Eastern Europe moved to Houston.

By the 1950s many Jewish families moved to Southwest Houston and Jewish institutions relocated there. The first subdivisions to receive Jews were neighborhoods along North Braeswood and South Braeswood. Subsequently, Meyerland began receiving Jews. From 1955 to around 1987 the Jewish population in Houston increased by 300%. By the 1970s Jews moved to Fondren Southwest in Southwest Houston and the Memorial and Spring Branch areas. By 1987 there were around 42,000 Jews in Greater Houston and Jews were located in many areas of Greater Houston.

In 2017 Hurricane Harvey damaged the Meyerland area, along with the three synagogues with the largest congregations, the Jewish community center, various Jewish private schools, and the Jewish senior home.

In 2024 the Jewish Federation of Greater Houston criticized some of the proposed changes to Texas public elementary school curriculum, arguing that these changes biased towards Christianity and against Judaism.

== Jewish population ==
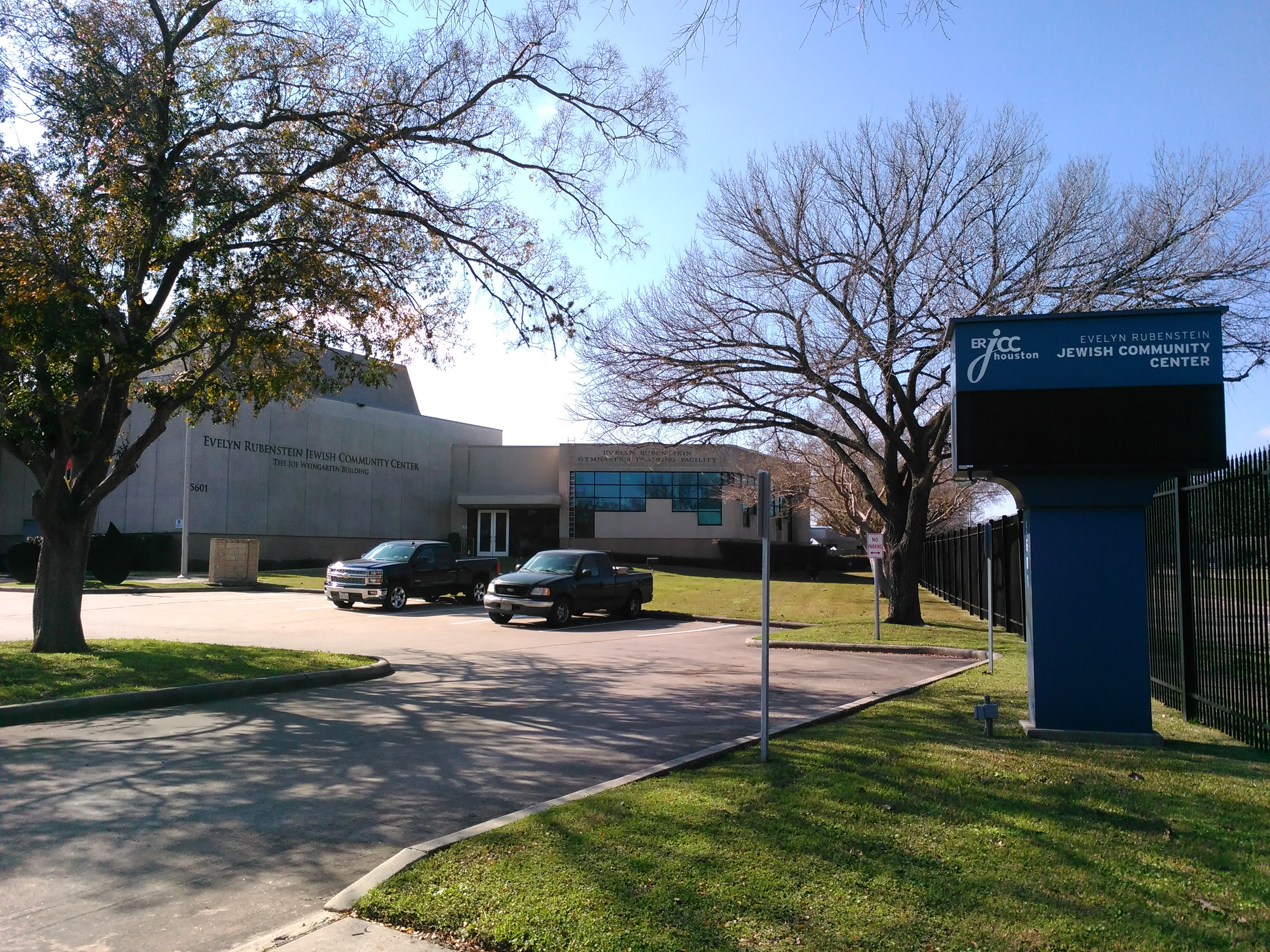
Evelyn Rubenstein Jewish Community Center

As of 1987, there were about 42,000 Jews in Greater Houston and about 2.5% of the City of Houston was Jewish. In 2001 the figure was 47,000 Jews in the Houston area. The Jewish Federation of Greater Houston made another population count in 2016, indicating that 51,000 Jews live in Greater Houston.

Houston Jews had origins from throughout the United States, Israel, Mexico, Russia, and other places. Because the population of Jews in Houston rapidly increased between 1955 and circa 1987, many of the Jews in the circa 1987 count were new to Houston. Roselyn Bell, author of the "Houston" entry in The Jewish Traveler: Hadassah Magazine's Guide to the World's Jewish Communities and Sights, wrote that this would make it, among other Jewish populations in the U.S., "medium-sized" and comparable to that of Pittsburgh, Pennsylvania. Philadelphia had a Jewish population more than five times larger than that of Houston, which had surpassed Philadelphia as the fourth largest city in the U.S. Bell wrote that the smaller relative population results in a combination of "the close-knit feeling of a middle-sized town with big-city sophistication and large-scale institutions".

=== Jewish communities ===
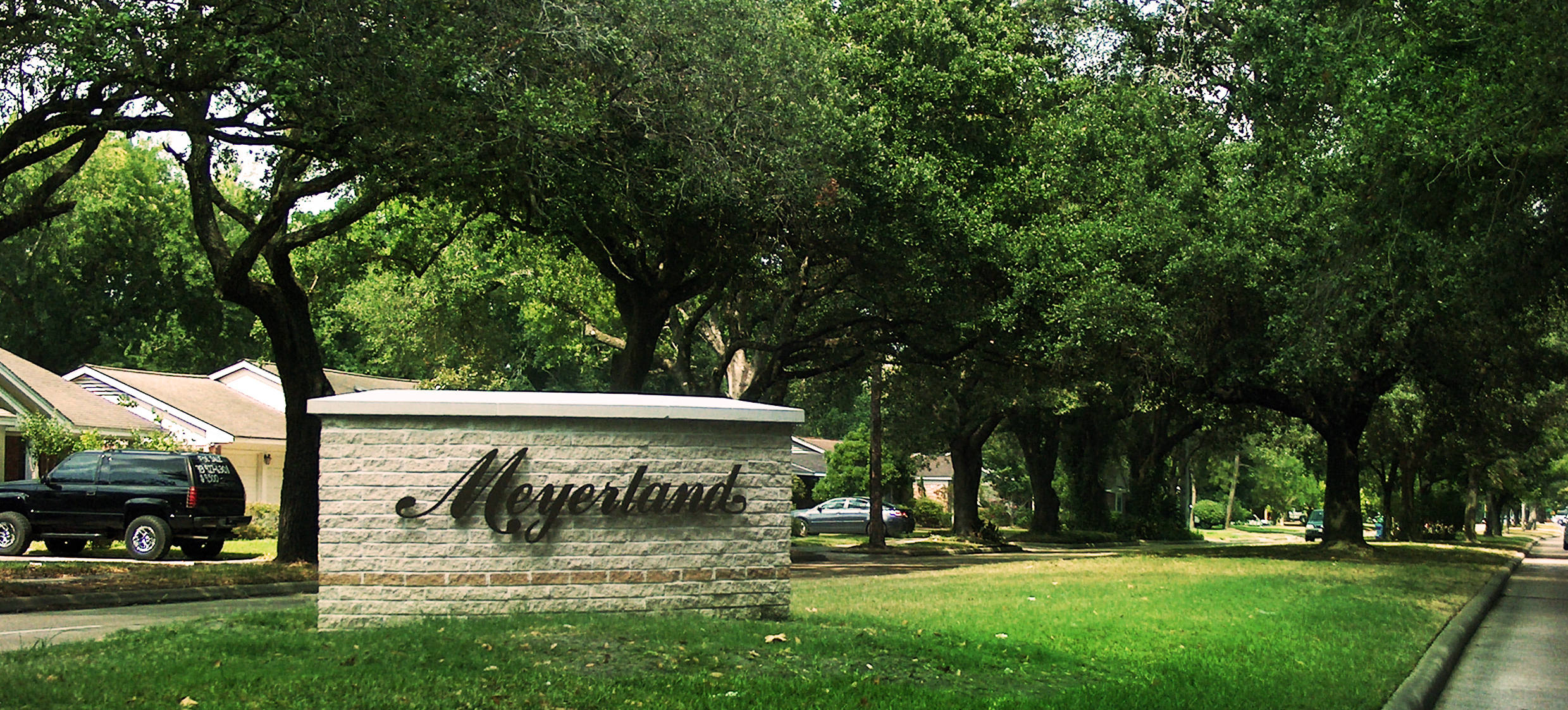
The Houston Jewish community is centered on Meyerland

As of 1987 Jews lived in many communities in Houston. In 2008 Irving N. Rothman, author of The Barber in Modern Jewish Culture: A Genre of People, Places, and Things, with Illustrations, wrote that Houston "has a scattered Jewish populace and not a large enough population of Jews to dominate any single neighborhood" and that the city's "hub of Jewish life" is the Meyerland community. Bell wrote that Southwest Houston is the "Jewish core of town, if not exactly an ethnic stronghold" and that synagogues had opened in Clear Lake City, Kingwood, and The Woodlands. Clear Lake City has also experienced a growth of Jewish populations in the 2010s.

== Synagogues ==
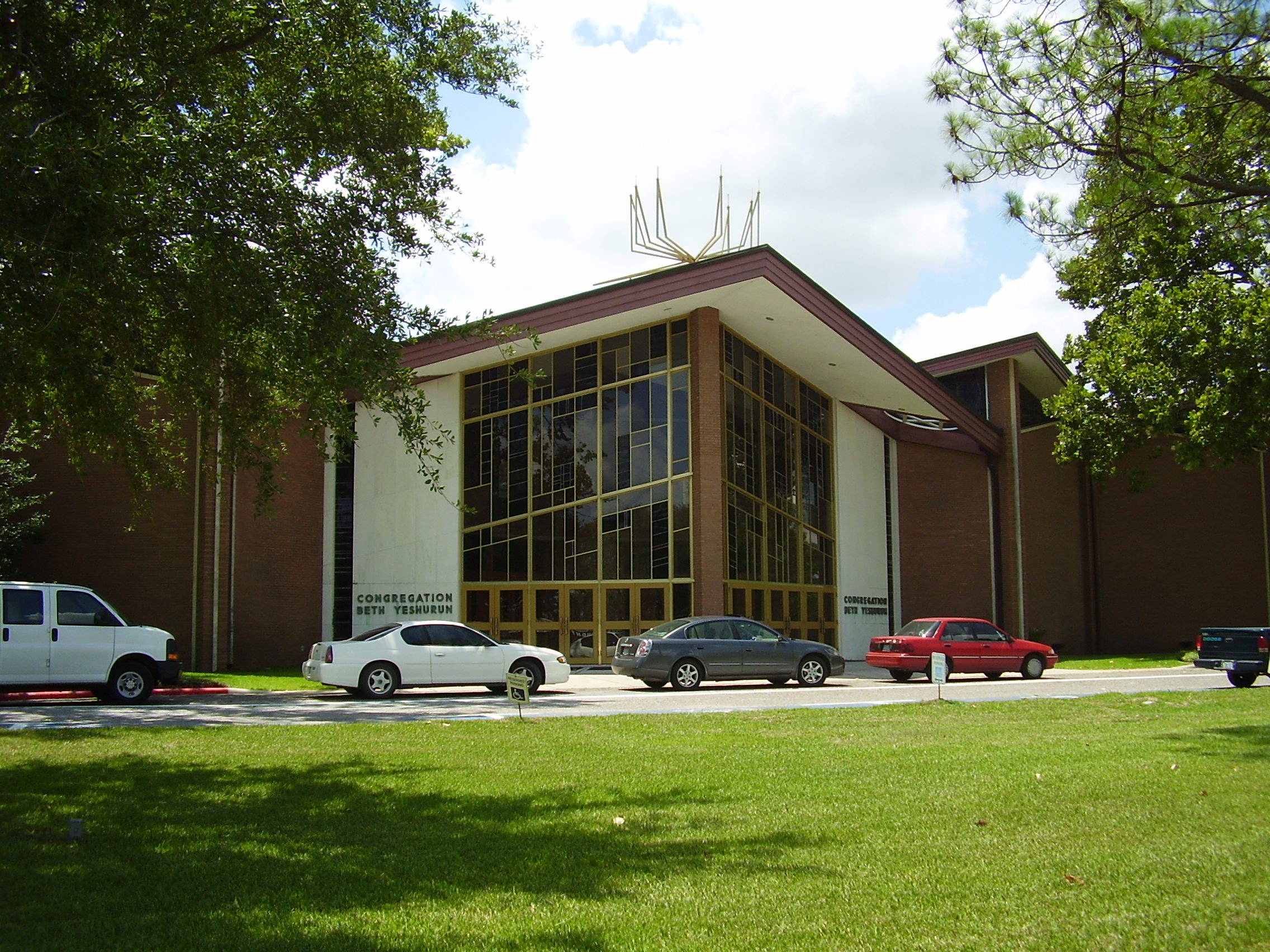
Congregation Beth Yeshurun

As of 1987 there were over 20 synagogues in Greater Houston. As of 2016 there were over 40 synagogues in Greater Houston.

As of 1987, Congregation Beth Yeshurun, a Conservative Judaism temple, and the Reform Judaism congregations Beth Israel and Emanu-El are the largest synagogues in Houston. The Orthodox Judaism community includes several congregations: Chabad Lubavitch Center of Houston, the Sephardic Beth Rambam Congregation, Young Israel of Houston, Meyerland Minyan, and the Sephardic synagogue Torah Vachesed.

The United Orthodox Synagogues congregation formed in 1961 as a consolidation of three synagogues. It occupied the same building near Meyerland since its groundbreaking that year. The building flooded during Memorial Day in 2015 and Tax Day in 2016. After Hurricane Harvey damaged the buildings in 2017, in December of that year the congregation's board decided to have the sanctuary and school building demolished; it would use the Freedman Hall building as the center of worship for the time being. As of 2018 the congregation has 300 people.

Congregation Emanu El Temple, using a Mid-Century Modern architectural style, was built in 1949.

By 2011 the Shul of Bellaire, a Chabad-Lubavitch, was established by Yossi Zaklikofsky in January 2011. It was the first Chabad-Lubavitch center in the city of Bellaire.

Congregation Or Ami is located in Westchase, in west Houston, in proximity to Greater Katy. As of 2018 the rabbi is Gideon Estes.

There are two Jewish places of worship in The Woodlands. Congregation Beth Shalom was established circa 1984. As of 2004 it had about 130 families, and it belongs to Reform Judaism. Its affiliated organizations are the Association of Reformed Congregations and the Union of American Hebrew Congregations. Chabad of The Woodlands was established in 2011 by Rabbi Mendel and Leah Blecher. It is a branch of the worldwide Chabad Lubavitch movement, offering traditional-style services to contemporary Jewish families. Chabad of The Woodlands inaugurated and sponsors the annual Chanukah on Market Street celebration, and established the first Jewish preschool in the area.

Chabad Pearland Jewish Center is the first Jewish center of worship in Pearland, established by Yossi and Esty Zaklikofsky in 2009. In addition to Pearland, it also serves Alvin and Friendswood.

Temple Beth Tikvah, the Jewish Center of Clear Lake, is in the Clear Lake area.

There are also synagogues in Humble and Victoria.

List of Synagogues:

- Congregation Beth Rambam (Sephardic)
- Torah Vachesed (Sephardic)
- Heimish (Hasidic)
- Young Israel of Houston
- Chabad Lubavitch Center
- Chabad at Rice
- Chabad at the Medical Center
- Chabad Lubavitch of West Houston - CHAI Learning Center
- Chabad of Uptown
- Congregation Emanu El
- Congregation Beth Israel of Houston
- Congregation Beth El
- Congregation Shma Koleinu
- Houston Congregation for Reform Judaism
- Temple Beth Tikvah
- Temple Sinai
- Congregation Beth Yeshurun (Houston)
- Congregation Brith Shalom
- Congregation Or Ami
- Congregation Shaar Hashalom
- The Shul of Bellaire
- Bellaire Jewish Center
- United Orthodox Synagogues "UOS"
- Keshet Houston (LGBT+)

== Education ==
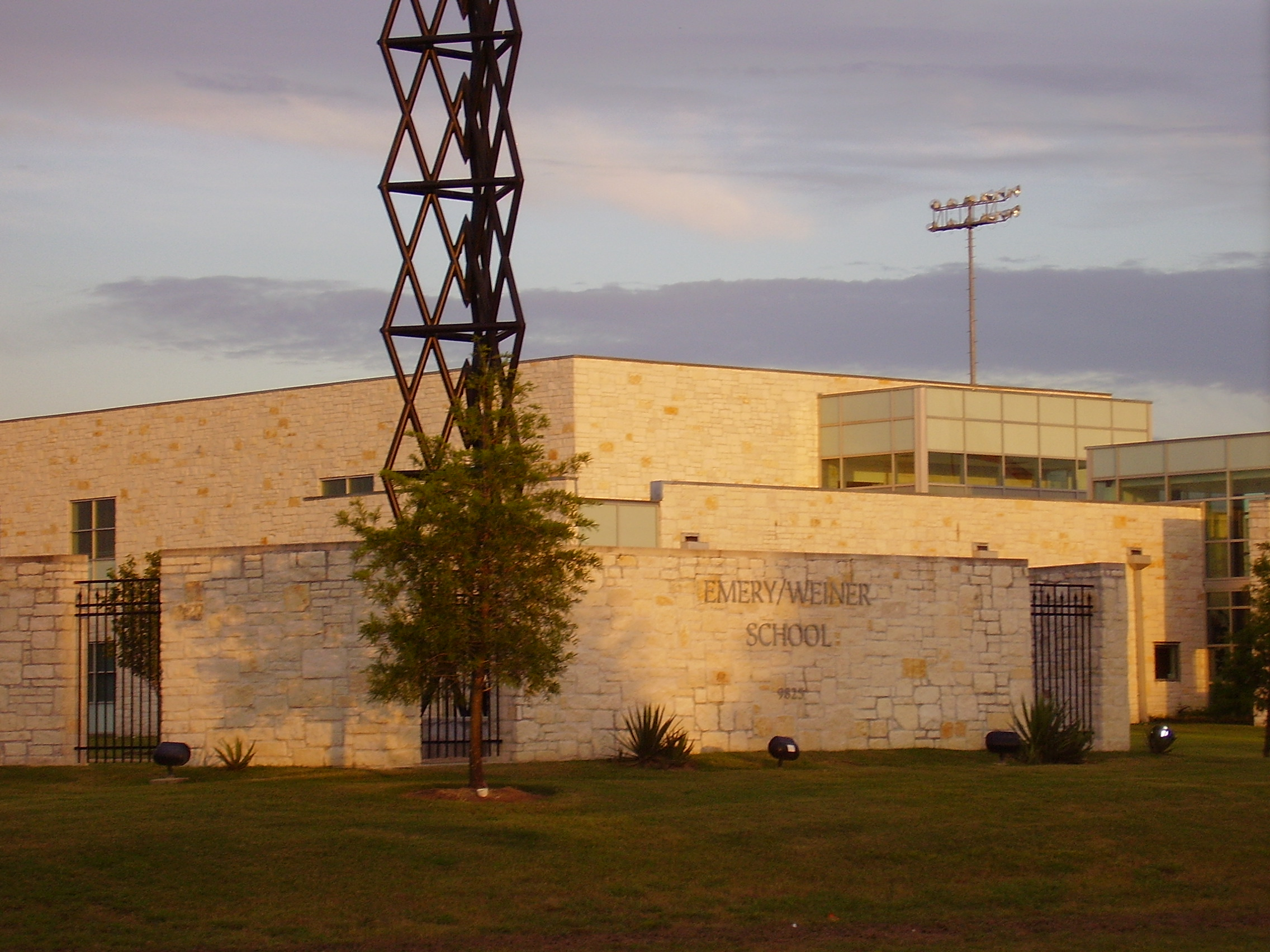
The Emery/Weiner School

Houston has several Jewish elementary schools. The Conservative Judaism elementary school in Houston is the William S. Malev School at Beth Yeshurun. The Reform Judaism elementary school is the Irvin M. Shlenker School at Beth Israel. Chabad Lubavitch sponsors the Torah Day School of Houston.

Emery/Weiner School is a Jewish secondary school in Houston. Around 1987 Bell wrote that the school, at the time I. Weiner Jewish Secondary School, had a "centrist" viewpoint. The Robert M. Beren Academy is a Modern Orthodox primary and secondary school. The school, previously named Hebrew Academy, is an independent Jewish school. Roselyn Bell, author of the "Houston" entry in The Jewish Traveler: Hadassah Magazine's Guide to the World's Jewish Communities and Sights, wrote that the Hebrew Academy had "Orthodox leanings".

Because of the large number of Jewish students, Bellaire High School historically had the nickname "Hebrew High".

== Economics ==
Around 1987 Roselyn Bell wrote that most Houston Jews work in professional industries, and that there was "a strong concentration in business, including direct retail and businesses supporting retail". Around 1987 Bell wrote that economic antisemitism and hiring discrimination against Jews existed in Greater Houston due to the fact that many businesses in the oil industry city do business with Arab countries.

Mickey Leland founded the Youth Kibbutz Internship, which sends ten minority children to Israel during Summer periods. This was established to deepen relations between African-American and Jewish communities and to decrease anti-Israeli sentiment.

== Media ==
The Jewish Herald-Voice is a Jewish community newspaper headquartered in Houston.

== Institutions ==
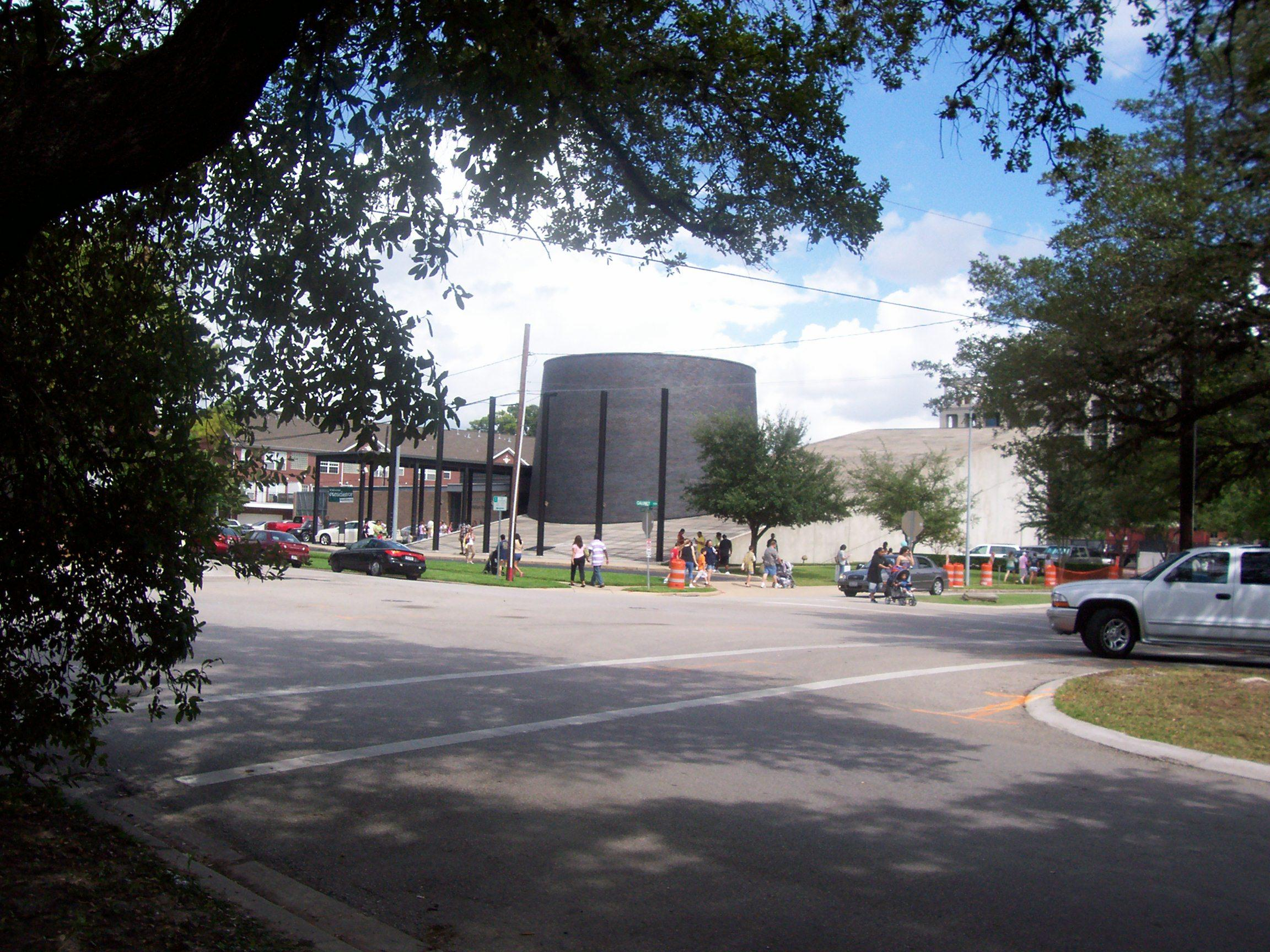
Holocaust Museum Houston.

The Jewish Federation of Greater Houston is headquartered in Houston.

The Jewish Community Center (JCC) has a main location on South Braeswood Boulevard and a Memorial-area west Houston branch. Within the Fondren area it operates the Bertha Alyce Early Childhood Center. The Jewish Federation of Greater Houston has its offices adjacent to the main JCC building. The Seven Acres Jewish Geriatric Center serves elderly populations.

The Holocaust Museum Houston opened in 1993.

Other institutions and organizations include Jewish Family Service, Hebrew Free Loan Association, Chabad Lubavitch Center, Hillel Foundation of Greater Houston, Seven Acres Jewish Geriatric Center, and multiple Jewish day schools.

Roselyn Bell wrote that synagogues and other major Jewish institutions in Houston "are built Texas-style; big, spread out, commodious, and pleasant to look at".

Rice University established the Houston Jewish History Archive circa 2017 to preserve Jewish history. Several items were archived and rescued after Hurricane Harvey hit Houston in 2017. As of 2018 Joshua Furman, the Stanford and Joan Alexander Postdoctoral Fellow in Jewish Studies of Rice U., and Rice centennial historian Melissa Kean were collecting items for the center.

== Notable persons ==
- Max Apple (author of Free Agents, taught at Rice University)
- David Biespiel (author of A Place of Exodus, Republic Cafe, The Education of a Young Poet, The Book of Men and Women, and other books, grew up in Meyerland).
- Rosellen Brown (author of Civil Wars and Tender Mercies, taught at the University of Houston)
- Aaron Farfel (University of Houston System Board of Regents chairperson, 1971–1979)
- Andrew Fastow
- Lea Fastow
- Billy Goldberg (president of the Texas Democratic Party)
- Mark Goldberg (politician) first District City Councilmember of Houston
- Norman Hackerman (president of the University of Texas at Austin and president of Rice University)
- Charles Hoffman (reporter for the Jerusalem Post)
- Jeffrey Hoffman (first Jewish astronaut)
- Fredell Lack (violinist)
- Rabbi Shimon Lazaroff (Director of Chabad Lubavitch of Texas with 13 branches in Houston and 37 throughout Texas)
- David Leebron (President of Rice University)
- Julia Wolf Mazow (published anthology The Woman Who Lost Her Names)
- Joseph Melnick (Baylor College of Medicine dean of graduate research and virologist)
- Alfred R. Neumann (University of Houston–Clear Lake founding chancellor)
- Judith Resnik (astronaut, died during the Space Shuttle Challenger disaster)
- Marvin Zindler (journalist)
- David Berg, Attorney and Author (attorney; partner at Berg and Androphy, and author of "Run, Brother, Run: A Memoir of a Murder in My Family")
- Ian Hernandez (philanthropist) Community leader with Congregation Beth El since 2013. Alumni of the Youth in philanthropy (YIP) organization. Organized various response actions to multiple Houston floods. Most known for his run across Texas. The One Step at a Time event raised several thousand dollars for Camp Impact, a Dallas area camp for underprivileged, abused, and homeless children.

== See also ==
- Demographics of Houston
- Religion in Houston
- History of the Jews in Galveston
- Changing Perspectives
