= Josh Wolf (baseball) =

American baseball player (born 2000)

Free agent
- Pitcher
- Born: September 1, 2000 (age 25); Bellaire, Texas, U.S.
- Bats: Right Throws: Right

Joshua David Wolf (born September 1, 2000) is an American professional baseball pitcher who is a free agent. He has also pitched for the Israeli national baseball team.

== Early life and amateur career ==
Wolf was born in Bellaire, Texas, and is Jewish. He had his Bar Mitzvah at the Western Wall in Jerusalem, and was a member of Congregation Beth Israel in Houston. His mother is from Israel and his father is from Cincinnati.

Wolf attended St. Thomas High School in Houston, Texas. Wolf played for the school's baseball team and was twice named All-State. As a junior he was 4-1 with a 1.06 earned run average (ERA), and 53 strikeouts in 39 innings. In his senior year, he struck out 126 batters in 69 innings, had a 1.52 ERA, and was named Outstanding Male High School Athlete of the Year by the Jewish Sports Heritage Association. He committed to attend Texas A&M University.

== Professional career ==
=== New York Mets ===
The New York Mets selected Wolf in the second round, with the 53rd overall selection, of the 2019 MLB draft. He was ranked the 36th-best prospect by MLB.com, and the 55th-best prospect by Baseball America. At the time of the draft, he could throw a 97 miles per hour (156 km/h) fastball, and had an above average curveball. He signed with the Mets for a $2.15 million signing bonus, forgoing his commitment to Texas A&M. He made his professional debut in 2019 with the Rookie-level Gulf Coast League Mets, going 0–1 with a 3.38 earned run average over eight innings, in which he struck out 12 batters and walked one batter.

Wolf did not play in a game in 2020 due to the cancellation of the minor league season because of the COVID-19 pandemic.

=== Cleveland Indians / Guardians ===
On January 7, 2021, the Mets traded Wolf, Amed Rosario, Andrés Giménez, and Isaiah Greene to the Cleveland Indians for Francisco Lindor and Carlos Carrasco. At the time, Wolf was the number 9 prospect in the Mets system. Indians president of baseball operations Chris Antonetti said: “He's a young, hard-throwing right-handed pitcher with a good mix of pitches. He's got an above-average fastball, up to 96 [mph]. He's got a really good slider. His changeup is his third pitch, and that's developing. He has the ingredients to develop into a successful starting Major League pitcher.”

For the 2021 season, Wolf was assigned to the Lynchburg Hillcats of the Low-A East. Over 18 games (17 starts), Wolf went 1–3 with a 5.35 ERA, striking out 67 batters over 65 2/3 innings. He split 2022 between the rookie–level Arizona Complex League Guardians and Lynchburg, and was 2-2 with a 5.61 ERA, striking out 25 batters in 25.2 innings.

Wolf pitched for the Israeli national baseball team in the 2023 World Baseball Classic. He split the 2023 campaign between the ACL Guardians and High-A Lake County Captains, struggling to a combined 6.11 ERA with 47 strikeouts across 45 2/3 innings pitched.

Wolf was released by the Guardians organization on May 19, 2024 after posting a 5.11 earned run average over 12 1/3 innings in 10 relief appearances for High–A Lake County.

=== San Francisco Giants ===
On May 23, 2024, Wolf signed a minor league contract with the San Francisco Giants. He made 24 appearances over the remainder of the season for the rookie-level Arizona Complex League Giants, Single-A San Jose Giants, and High-A Eugene Emeralds.

Wolf returned to Eugene in 2025, posting a 5-3 record and 4.74 ERA with 67 strikeouts and one save across 29 games (9 starts). He elected free agency following the season on November 6, 2025.

=== Charros de Jalisco ===
On April 18, 2026, Wolf signed with the Charros de Jalisco of the Mexican League. In two relief appearances, he gave up seven earned runs over 2 1/3 innings pitched. Wolf was released by Jalisco on April 23.

=== York Revolution ===
On May 3, 2026, Wolf signed with the York Revolution of the Atlantic League of Professional Baseball. He posted a 9.00 ERA, giving up three earned runs in three innings of relief work. Wolf was released by the Revolution on May 15.

== See also ==
- List of select Jewish baseball players
