= Holocaust Museum Houston =

Coordinates: 29°43′30.45″N 95°23′08.97″W

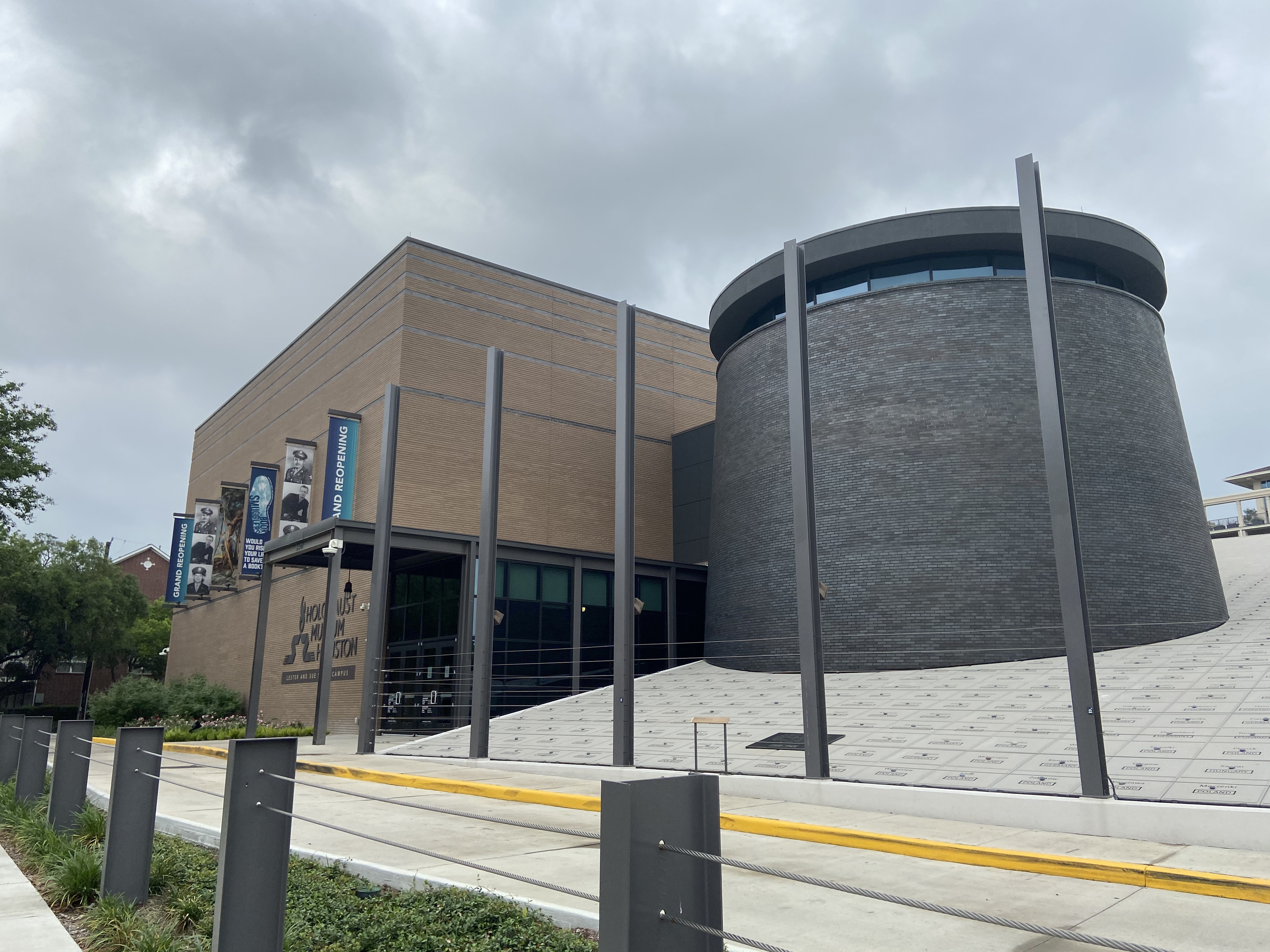
- Established: 1996
- Location: Houston, Texas
- Type: Holocaust museum
- Public transit access: Red Line Museum District
- Website: www.hmh.org

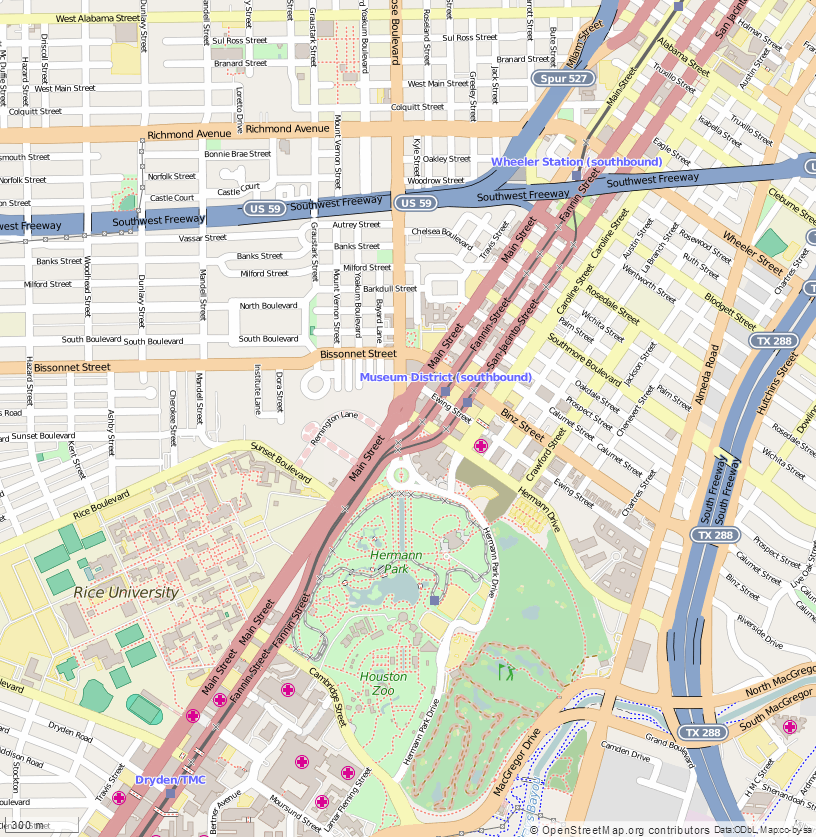
Location within Houston Museum District

The Holocaust Museum Houston is located in Houston's Museum District, in Texas. It is the fourth largest holocaust museum in the U.S. It was opened in 1996.

The Boniuk Center houses Holocaust Museum Houston's Education Department.

== Museum renovation ==
In June 2019, Holocaust Museum Houston underwent a $34 million expansion of its original building in the Houston Museum District. By more than doubling in size to a total of 57,000 square feet (5,300 m^{2}), the new facility ranks as the nation's fourth-largest Holocaust museum and is fully bilingual in English and Spanish. The new three-story structure houses a welcome center, four permanent galleries and two changing exhibition galleries, classrooms, a research library, a café, a 200-seat indoor theater, and a 175-seat outdoor amphitheater. The exhibits now discuss the overall history surrounding the Holocaust, as well as other genocides. Some items were moved to protect them during construction, including the rescue boat "Hanne Frank" and a railcar.

== Gallery ==
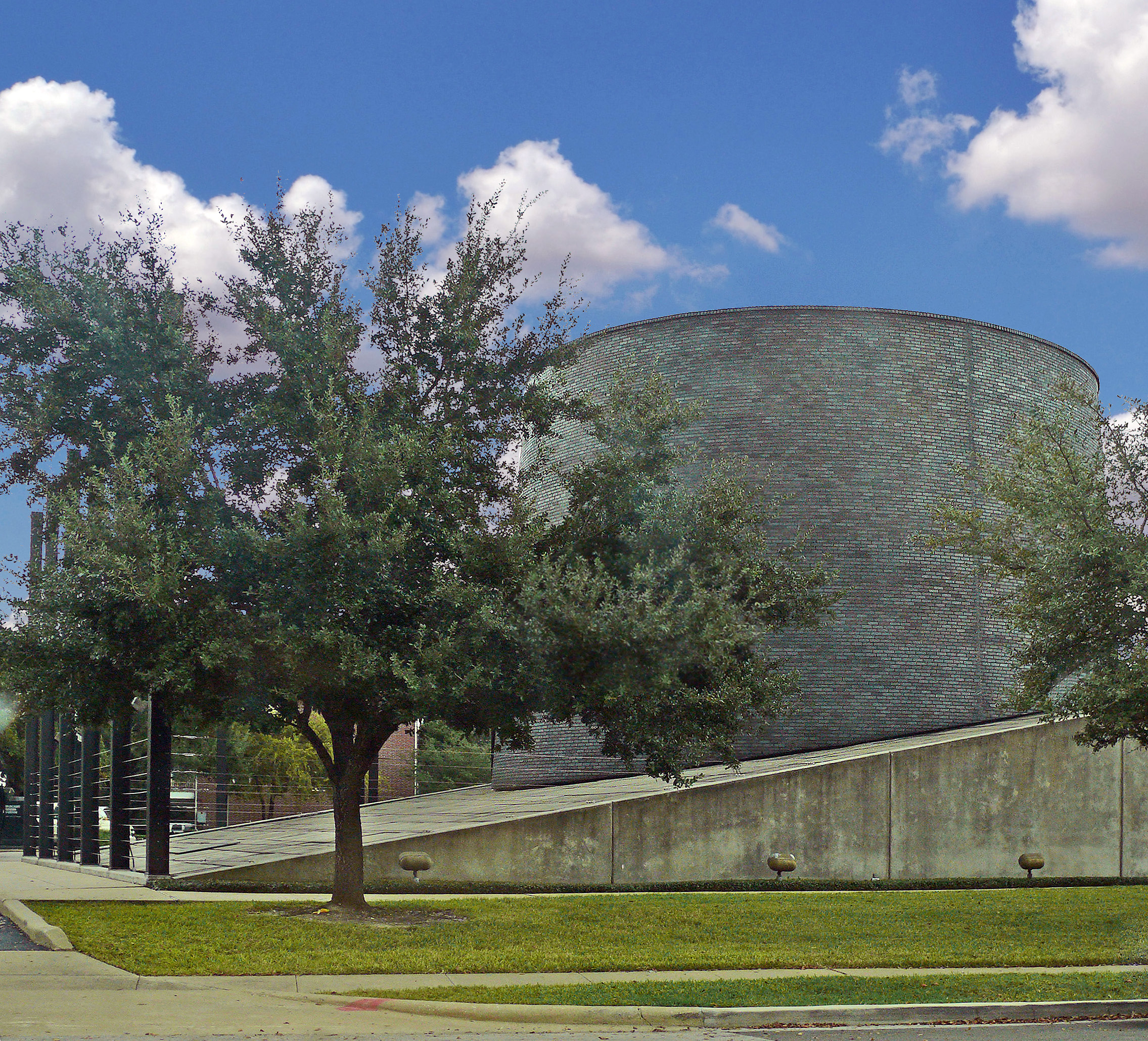
Holocaust Museum (pre-renovation building)

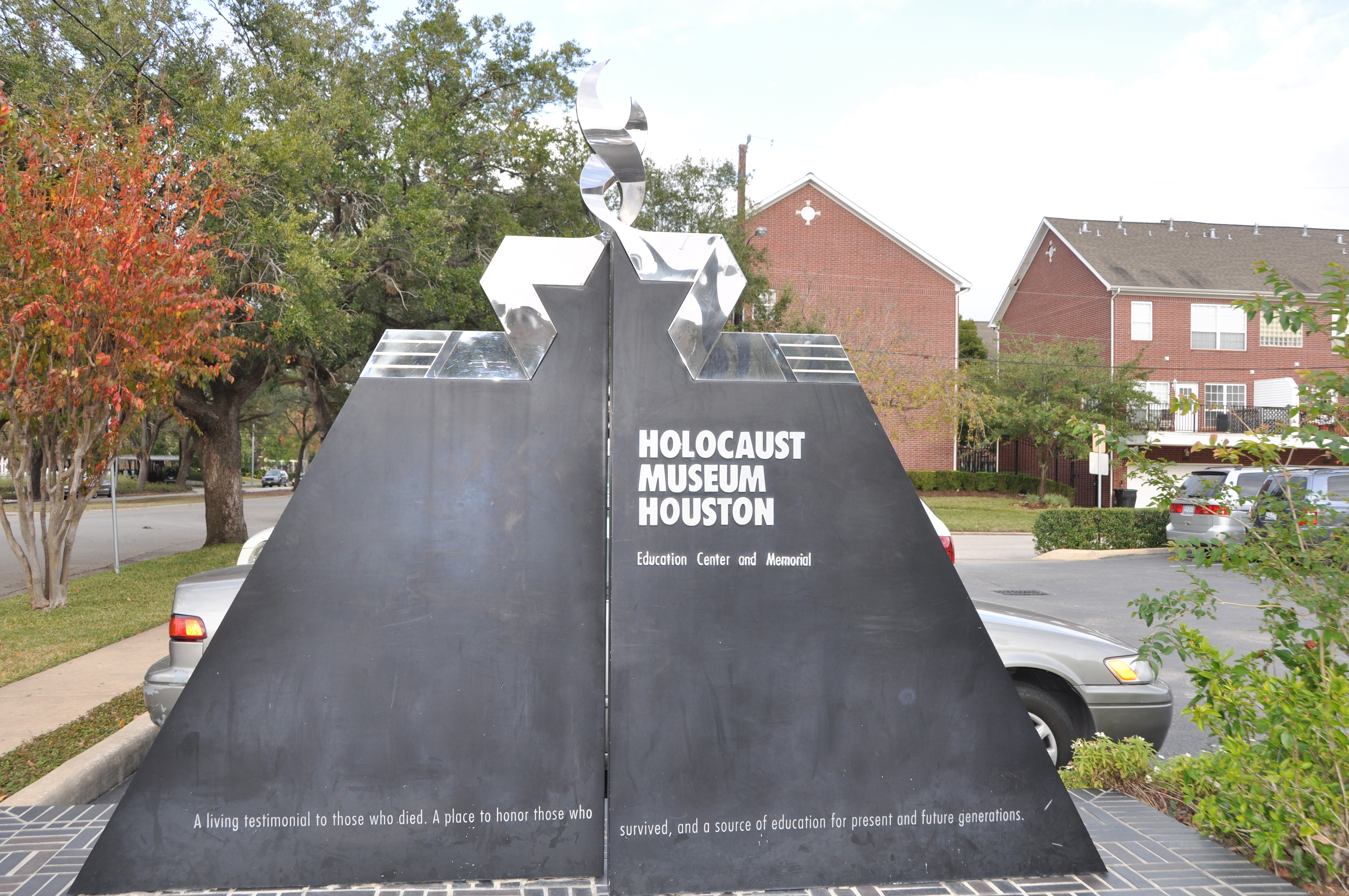
Museum Parking Lot Entrance (pre-renovation building)

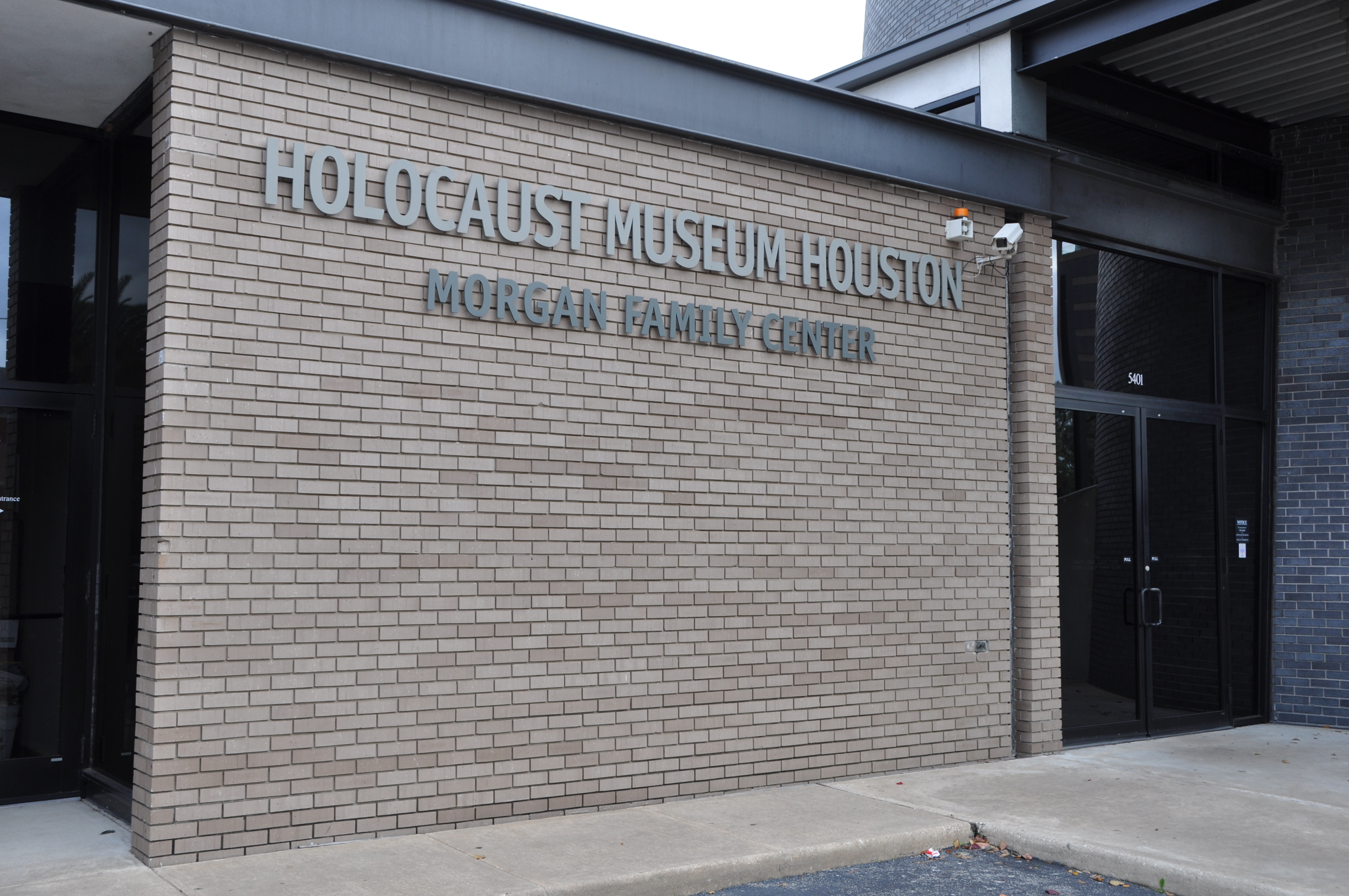
Museum Entrance (pre-renovation building)

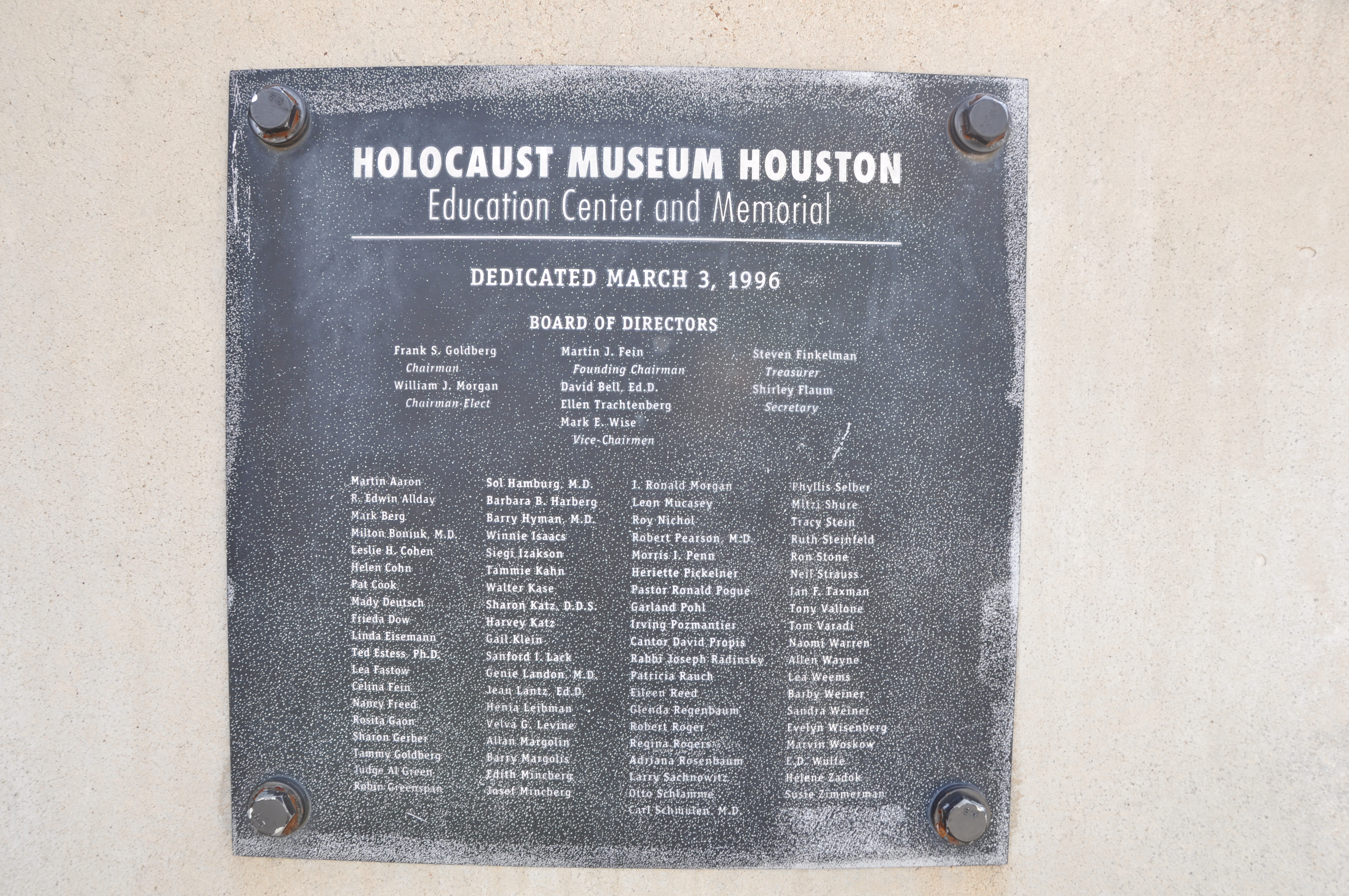
Plate in front of the museum on which dedication date of March 3, 1996 and the names of board of directors and patrons are marked (pre-renovation building)

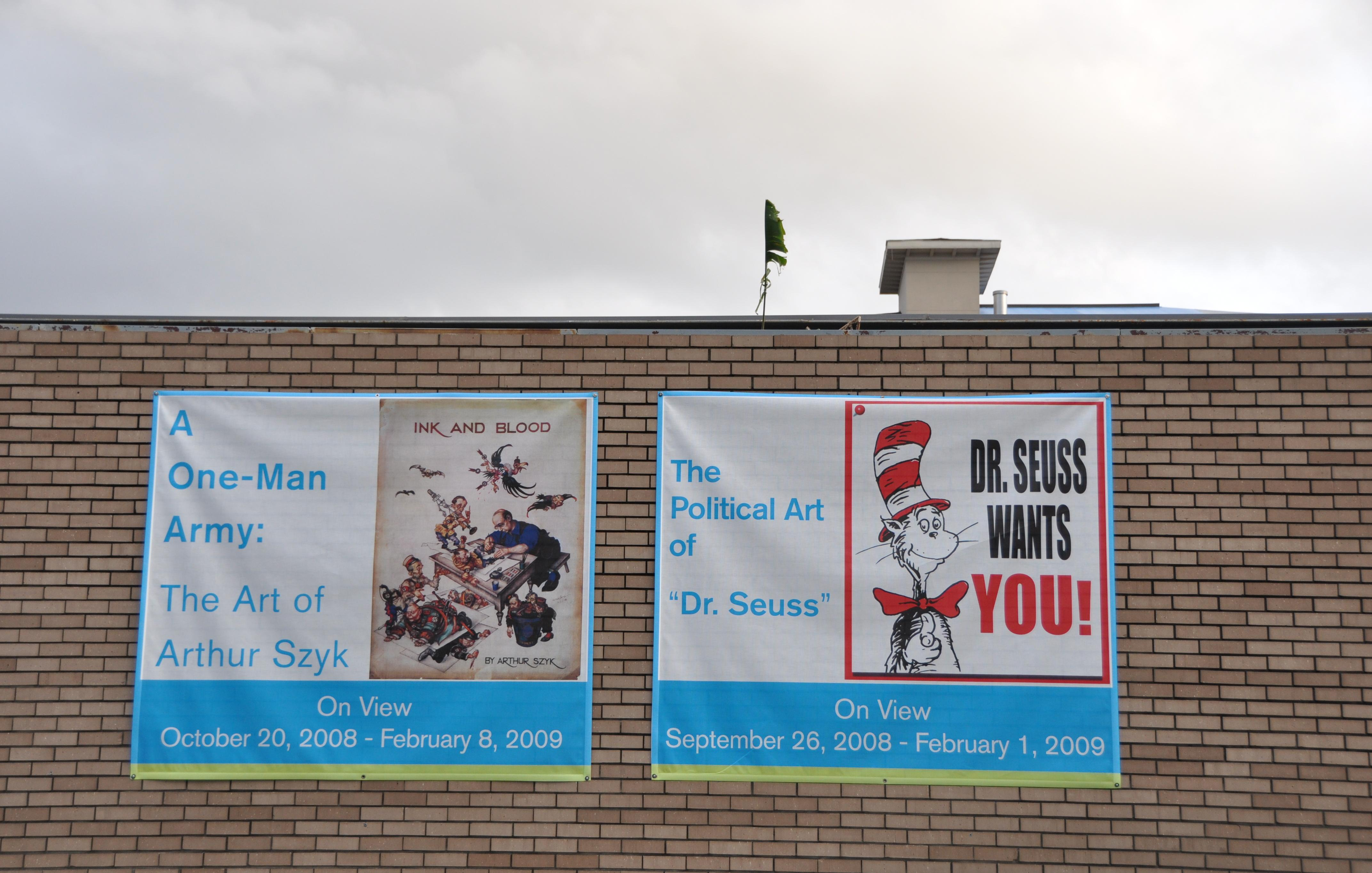
Advertisement in front of Houston Holocaust Museum announcing display of cartoons by Arthur Szyk and Dr. Seuss during World War II (pre-renovation building)

== See also ==
- History of the Jews in Houston
