= Hyman Judah Schachtel =

English Rabbi

Hyman Judah Schachtel (1907–1990) was Senior Rabbi of Congregation Beth Israel of Houston from 1943 to 1975. From 1975–1990 he served as Rabbi Emeritus of Congregation Beth Israel of Houston. He also served the Houston Jewish community as “rabbi-at-large” for the remainder of his life. On January 20, 1965, Rabbi Schachtel delivered the inaugural prayer for President Lyndon B. Johnson in Washington, D.C. He was the author of several published works, including The Real Enjoyment of Living (1954), The Shadowed Valley (1962), and How to Meet the Challenge of Life and Death (1980).

== Biography ==
Schachtel was born in London in May 1907, and came to the United States on the Lusitania with his family in 1914. They settled in Buffalo, New York, where Schachtel’s father Bernard secured employment as a cantor. Schachtel was ordained into the rabbinate at Hebrew Union College in Cincinnati in 1931. His first pulpit was at Congregation Shaaray Tefila (sometimes referred to as the West End Synagogue) in New York City, where he served from 1931 until his arrival in Houston. Schachtel became a close personal friend of Lyndon B. Johnson, and delivered the inaugural prayer at President Johnson’s inauguration in Washington, D.C., on January 20, 1965.

Schachtel received a doctorate in Education from the University of Houston in 1948, as well as honorary degrees from Southwestern University in Georgetown and Hebrew Union College as well from Harvard. Locally, he served terms as president of the Houston Rabbinical Association and Texas Kallah of Rabbis. He was also a member of the executive board of the Central Conference of American Rabbis, and served as vice-president and secretary-treasurer of the organization’s southwest region. Schachtel was a dedicated advocate of interfaith understanding, and was honored for this work by the National Conference of Christians and Jews, the American Jewish Committee, and B’nai Brith.

Rabbi Schachtel was well known to generations of Houstonians through his columns in the Houston Post and a radio show on KODA-FM. He died on January 11, 1990.

Rabbi Schachtel published a number of books. The often quoted thought, “Happiness is not having what you want, but wanting what you have,” was originally written in his book, The Real Enjoyment of Living (1954). Among his other published works are The Life You Want To Live (1956), The Shadowed Valley (1962), and How To Meet The Challenge of Life and Death (1980).

Schachtel was an anti-Zionist and rejected the idea "that we are Jews by race and nationality".

== Sources ==
Excerpted from: Handbook of Texas Online, Phyllis Harris, "Schachtel, Hyman Judah," accessed March 15, 2018, http://www.tshaonline.org/handbook/online/articles/fsc83.

Uploaded on June 15, 2010. Modified on November 20, 2017. Published by the Texas State Historical Association.
