= Torah Day School of Houston =

Coordinates: 29.661378°N 95.509202°W

Torah Day School of Houston is a Jewish Day School in Houston, Texas established in 1977 by the Texas Regional Headquarters of the Chabad Lubavitch. It offers a Jewish education to grades K-8 in addition to its Early Childhood Center for children ages eighteen months through four years old. In 2025, Torah Day school bought a new campus where they hope to create a large childhood center, middle school, and high school. It is still under construction.

== About ==
Rabbi Shimon Lazaroff opened the school along with parents in an attempt to provide quality Jewish and general studies education for the Houston Jewish Community.

For over fifty years its students have received a traditional Jewish education, comprehensive in scope, and a simultaneous general studies program.

The dual curriculum eliminates the need for after school religious classes as it provides daily Judaic learning experiences for pre-school through eighth grade students.

== Accreditation & Affiliations ==
- Texas Alliance of Accredited Private Schools (TAAPS)
- National Accreditation Board of Merkos - Central Organization for Jewish Education
- The Jewish Federation of Greater Houston
- A beneficiary of the United Jewish Campaign
- Torah Umesorah - National Society for Hebrew Day Schools

== Administrative Staff ==
- Rabbi Shimon Lazaroff - Head of School
- Mrs. Chiena Lazaroff - Director
- Rabbi Enan Francis - Principal and Assistant Head of School
- Sarah Kaufman - Head of Early Childhood Development Program

== See also ==
- History of the Jews in Houston
