= Congregation Beth Yeshurun (Houston) =

Synagogue

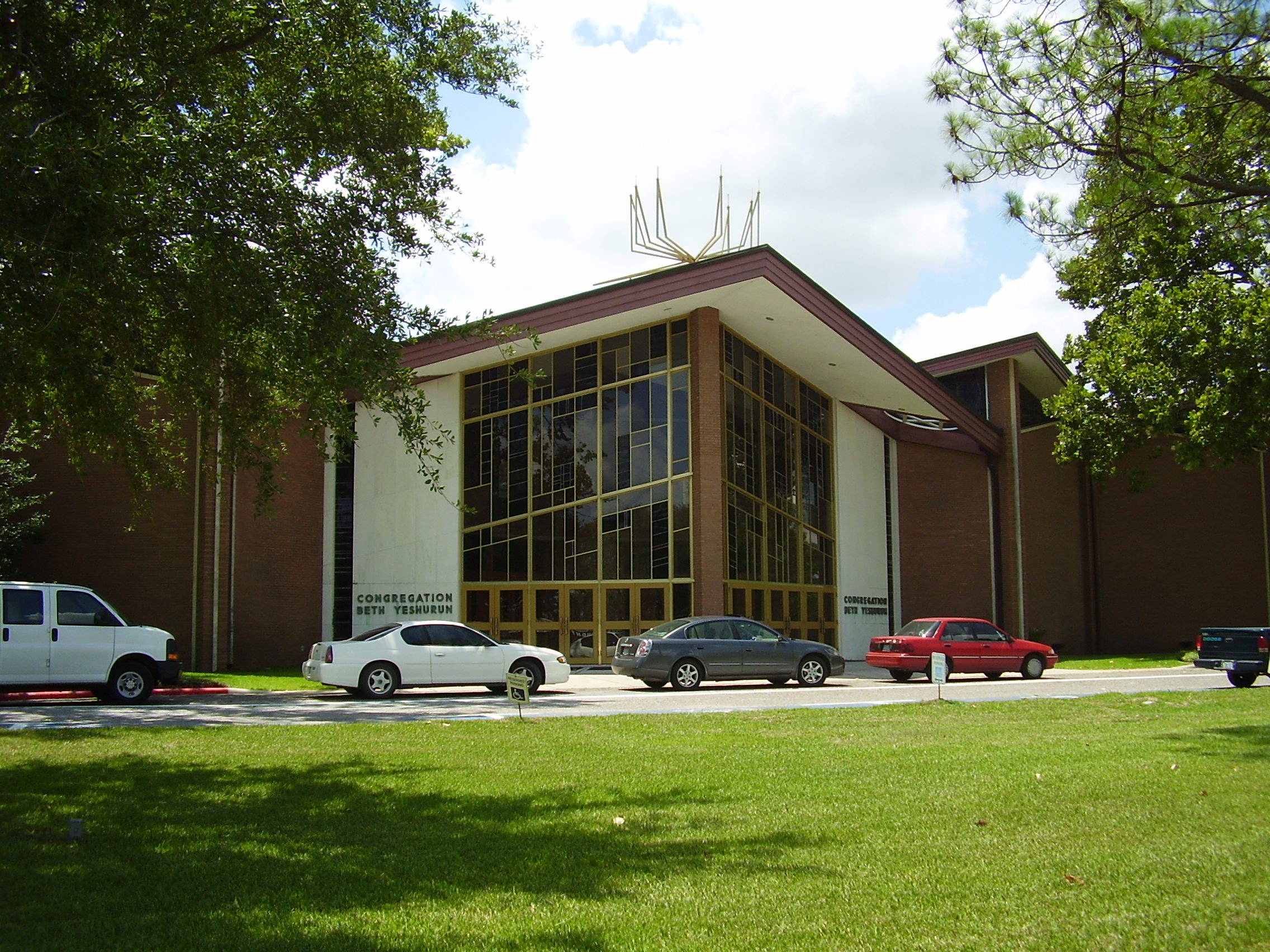
- Beth Yeshurun synagogue, in 2009

- Location in Texas

Religion
- Affiliation: Conservative Judaism
- Ecclesiastical or organisational status: Synagogue
- Status: Active

Location
- Location: 4525 Beechnut Street, Houston, Texas
- Country: United States
- Coordinates: 29°41′19″N 95°27′12″W

Architecture
- Architect: Levin/Brown
- Type: Synagogue
- Style: Modernist
- Established: 1887 (as Adath Yeshurun); 1924 (as Beth El); 1946 (merged)
- Completed: 1908 (Preston Street); 1925 (Austin Street); 1945 (Southmore Avenue); 1962 (Beechnut Street)
- Materials: Stained-glass windows by David Ascalon

Website
- bethyeshurun.org

Congregation Beth Yeshurun is a Conservative synagogue at 4525 Beechnut Street, Houston. It is the largest Conservative synagogue in the United States.

Founded in 1891 as Adath Yeshurun, it merged in Congregation Beth El in 1946, taking its current name. In 2002 Beth Yeshurun absorbed the membership of Shearith Israel of nearby Wharton, Texas.

It includes the Beth Yeshurun Day School (BYDS).

== History ==
Beth Yeshurun was formed as a merger of the Adath Yeshurun and Beth El congregations.

=== Adath Yeshurun ===
Congregation Adath Yeshurun was founded in 1887 as an Orthodox alternative to Temple Beth Israel which in 1874 had moved from Orthodox to Reform. It was a Russian-Polish congregation. After a period during which the congregation met for prayers in private homes, a wood-framed, former church was purchased at the corner of Walker Ave. and Jackson street. Adath Yeshurun merged into Congregation Adath Yeshurun in 1891. Growth of the congregation, especially an influx of members who moved to Houston at the turn of the twentieth century; the congregation dedicated a large, new synagogue at the corner of Preston Avenue and Hamilton Street in 1908.

=== Congregation Beth El ===
Congregation Beth El was founded in 1924. It was the first Conservative synagogue founded in Houston. In 1925 it occupied the former Temple Beth Israel building.

== Current synagogue ==
The original building was established in 1945 in the Third Ward area and in proximity to the University of Houston.

Beth Yeshurun moved from its building at 3501 Southmore Avenue to its present location at 4525 Beechnut Street in 1962. From 1998 to 2004, the synagogue undertook a major renovation and more than 30,000 square feet of building were added. The synagogue's foyer has a memorial to the Jews murdered in the Holocaust. A 26-foot-long (7.9 m) ark with a Burning Bush-motifed stained-glass background serves as the focus of the synagogue's sanctuary. The synagogue includes a social hall. The walls of the social hall are decorated with needlepoint recreations of Reuven Rubin's series of biblical lithographs. Beth Yeshurun houses the Louis and Mollie Kaplan Museum of Judaica, which includes ritual objects and books.

== Beth Yeshurun Day School ==
Beth Yeshurun Day School was the first Jewish Day School in Texas, founded in 1949 under the leadership of Rabbi William S. Malev, the rabbi of the congregation at that time.

During the COVID-19 pandemic in Texas, as of 2022, more students attended Beth Yeshurun Day School than previously. An organization called Prizmah stated in a 2021 report that families with a preference for education in a school setting during a pandemic, as opposed to via the internet, often preferred schools that continued offering such.

== Gallery ==
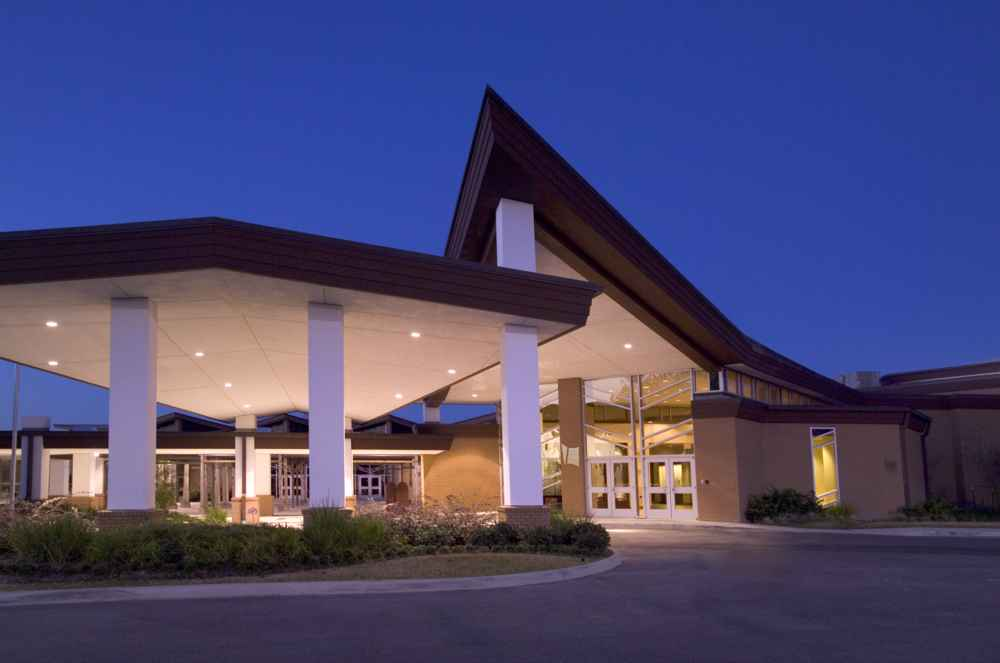
Contemporary synagogue external architecture by Levin/Brown

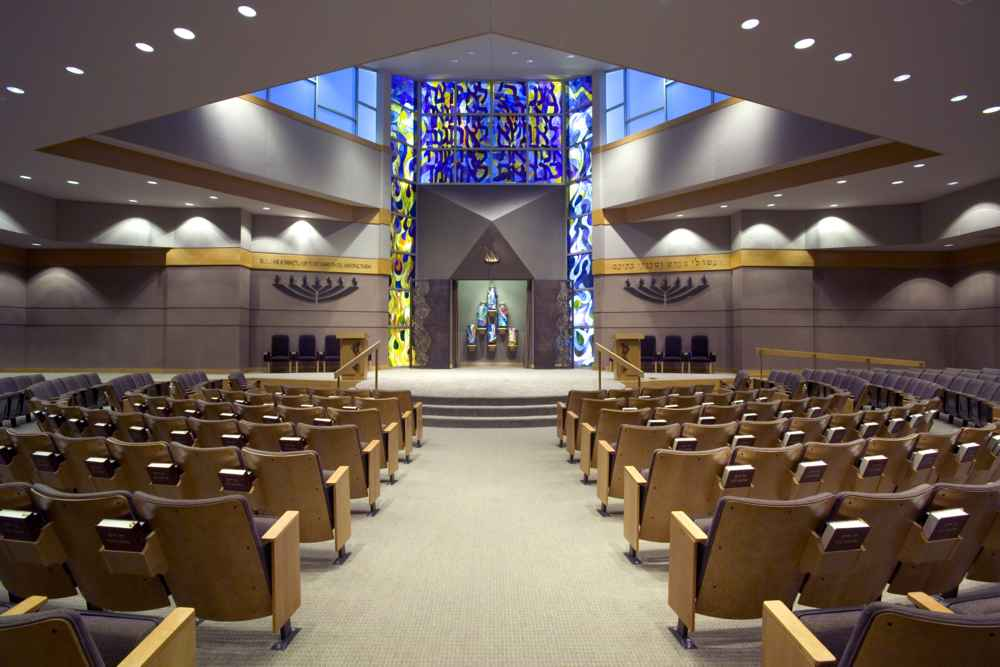
Interior of sanctuary.

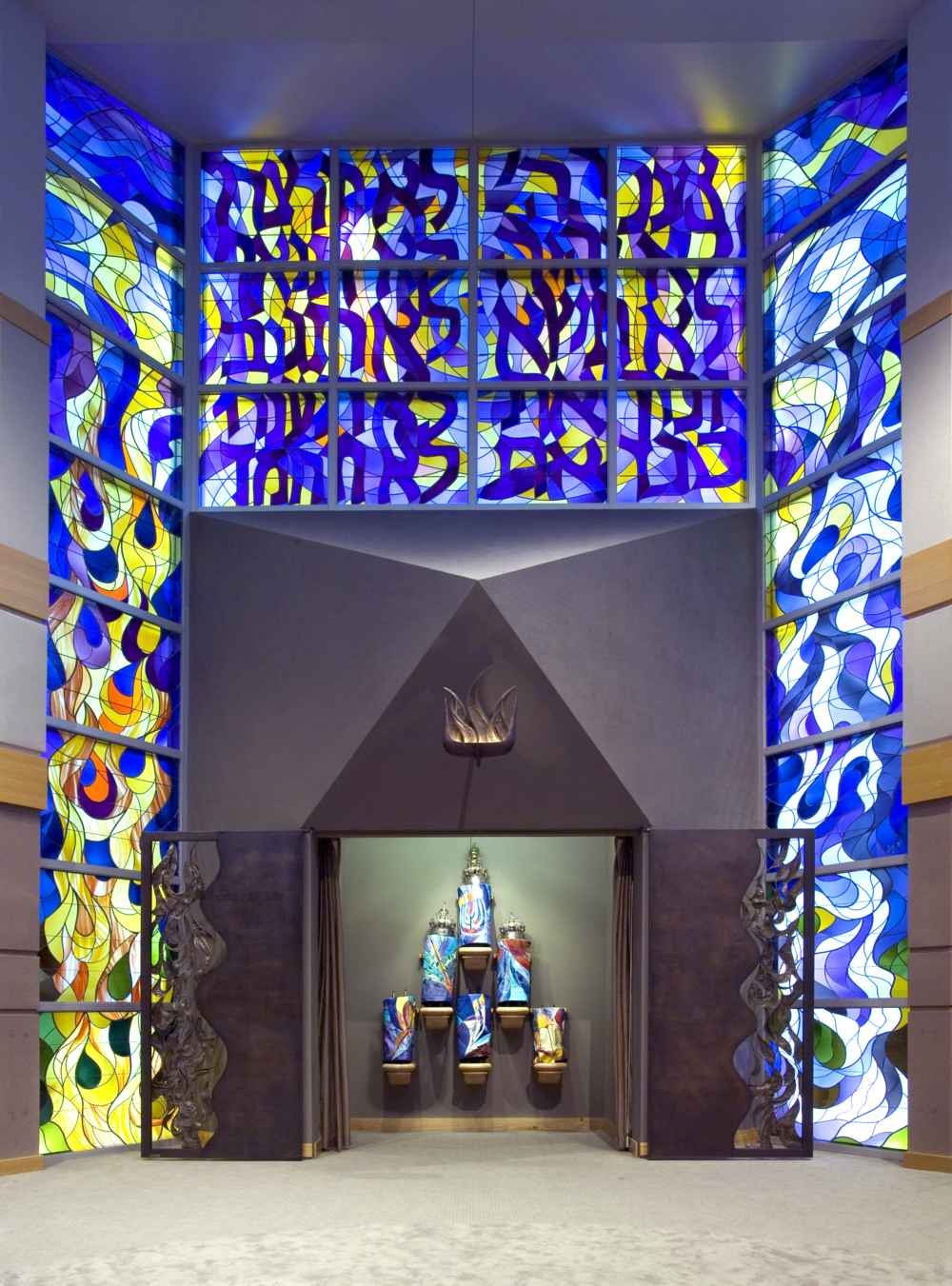
Sanctuary elements include stained glass windows, Ark, and ner tamid (eternal flame), by David Ascalon

== See also ==
- History of the Jews in Houston
