= Congregation Beth Israel (Houston) =

Historic site in Harris County, Texas

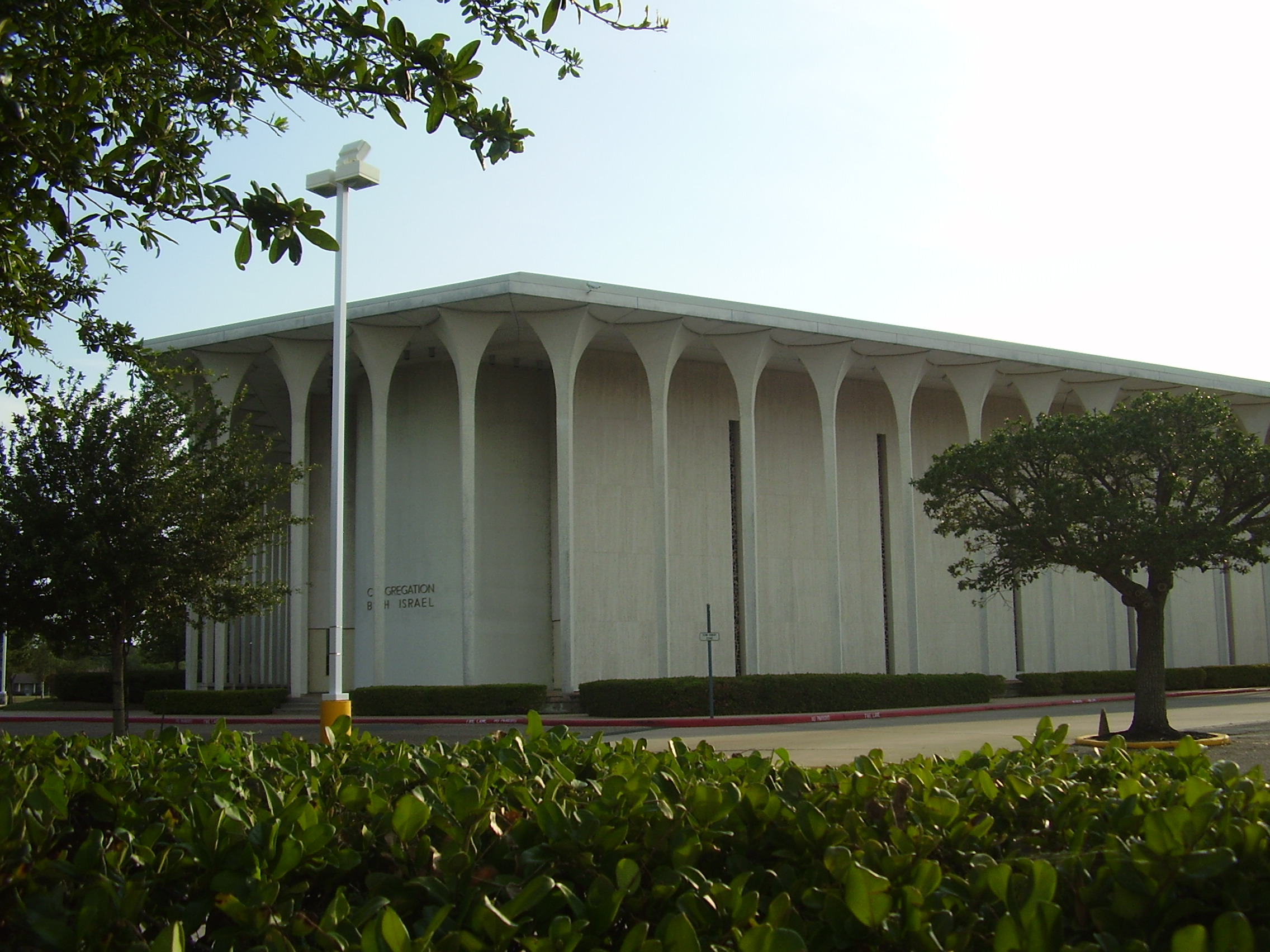
- Beth Israel synagogue

- Location in Texas

Religion
- Affiliation: Reform Judaism
- Ecclesiastical or organisational status: Synagogue
- Leadership: Rabbi David A. Lyon; Rabbi Adrienne P. Scott; Cantor Kenneth J. Feibush
- Status: Active

Location
- Location: 5600 N. Braeswood Blvd., Houston, Texas 77096
- Country: United States
- Coordinates: 29°40′37″N 95°29′16″W

Architecture
- Established: 1854 (as a congregation)
- Completed: 1874 (Franklin Avenue); 1908 (Crawford Street); 1925 (see NRHP below); 1967 (N. Braeswood Blvd.)

Website
- beth-israel.org
- Temple Beth Israel
- U.S. National Register of Historic Places
- Recorded Texas Historic Landmark
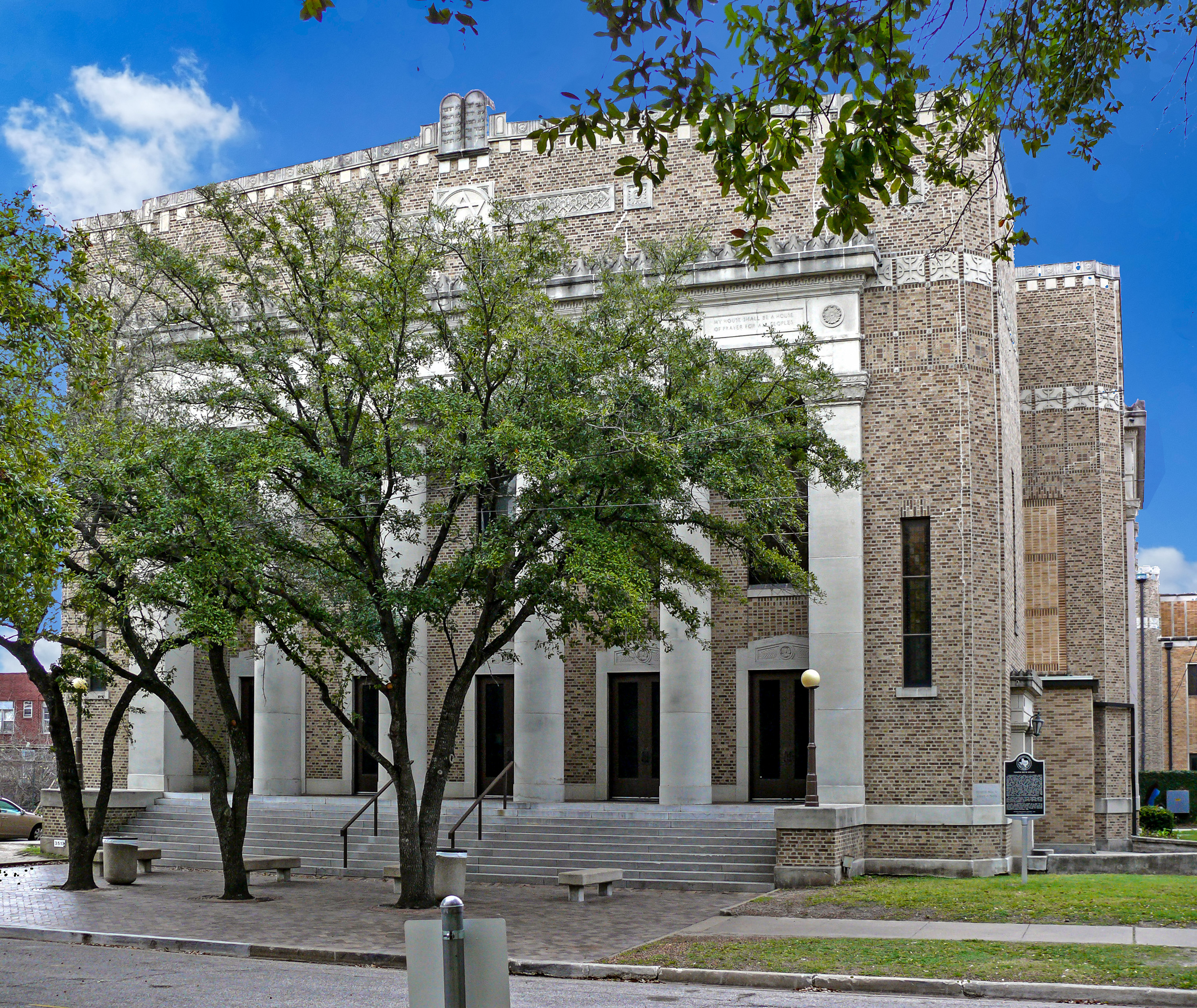
- Former Temple Beth Israel building, 1925–1967
- Location: 3517 Austin St., Midtown Houston, Texas
- Coordinates: 29°44′14″N 95°22′30″W
- Built: 1924 – 1925
- Architect: Finger, Joseph
- Architectural style: Streamline Moderne
- NRHP reference No.: 84001826
- RTHL No.: 14339

Significant dates
- Added to NRHP: March 1, 1984
- Designated RTHL: 1974

Congregation Beth Israel is a Reform Jewish congregation and synagogue located at 5600 North Braeswood Boulevard, in Houston, Texas, in the United States. The congregation, founded in 1854, is the oldest Jewish congregation in Texas; and it operates the Shlenker School.

== History ==
The congregation was founded in 1854 as an Orthodox Jewish kehilla and legally chartered in 1859. The Orthodox Beth Israel Congregation in Houston opened in a former house that had been converted to a synagogue. In 1874 the congregation voted to change their affiliation to Reform Judaism, sparking the foundation of Congregation Adath Yeshurun, now known as Congregation Beth Yeshurun. Hyman Judah Schachtel was a past rabbi.

Beth Israel's Franklin Avenue Temple building was completed in 1874. The temple was at Crawford Street at Franklin Avenue in what is now Downtown Houston. In 1908 the congregation moved into a new temple at Crawford at Lamar Street, in an area that was a Jewish community. After the congregation left the Lamar site, the New Day Temple occupied it. As of 2016 The Grove at Discovery Green occupies the former Lamar site.

Maximilian Heller was rabbi of the congregation from 1886 to 1887.

A new temple at Austin Street and Holman Avenue was dedicated in 1925. Originally it was considered to be a part of the Third Ward.

Rabbi Henry Barnston served as the Congregation's rabbi from 1900 to 1943, after which he served as rabbi emeritus until his death in 1949.

The Moderne style, 1924-built Austin Street building, designed by congregant Joseph Finger, was listed on the U.S. National Register of Historic Places in 1984 and was awarded Recorded Texas Historical Landmark status in 2009.

In 1943 Temple Beth Israel announced that people who espoused Zionist ideals, observed the laws of kashrut or favored the perpetuation of Hebrew as a language were not allowed to be members, so Emanu-El was formed by people who disagreed with the decision. As of 1967 Beth Israel accepts people with Zionist beliefs.

In 1966 the Houston Independent School District purchased the 1920s temple building on Austin Street. (Note: Quote: "A former Hebrew temple across the street from San Jacinto had been purchased by the school district in 1966 as an annex for the school's burgeoning enrollment".) (Note: Quote: "Denny was given her choice of three district-owned sites in the central city just outside of downtown Houston for the new school: W. D. Cleveland Elementary School to the west; Montrose Elementary School to the southwest; and the former Temple Beth Israel to the south. Denney, with the assistance of Barry Moore, one of her former Lamar drama students who had become an architect, toured all three sites, giving facilities for performance priority over any other consideration. The former Temple Beth Israel, the annex since 1966 for HISD's vocational San Jacinto High School [renamed Houston Technical Institute on June 1, 1971], seemed best suited for HSPVA's temporary use. Despite five years of district neglect, the sanctuary, attached two-story Levy Memorial Hall, and adjacent one-story Mendelsohn Education Building had the essential components for a small arts high school; use of this campus would only be necessary until HISD could pass a bond issue including funds for a new state-of-the-art building (...)".) HISD began using that building—at first—as an annex for San Jacinto High School since the school's population was increasing.

In the years leading to 1967, the Jewish community was moving to Meyerland. To follow the community, in 1967 the congregation moved to a new temple on North Braeswood Boulevard. The former temple building on Austin Street became the first home of Houston's High School for the Performing and Visual Arts and was renamed the Ruth Denney Theatre. When the high school moved to new quarters, the building became a performance venue for Houston Community College's Central Fine Arts division and was renamed the Heinen Theatre. The historic building is located in Midtown Houston. (Note: There are separate boundaries for the Midtown Super Neighborhood and the Midtown Management District.)

Rabbi David Lyon, Rabbi Adrienne Scott, and Cantor Kenneth Feibush currently preside over the congregation of Beth Israel.

== Properties ==
=== Current property ===
The current synagogue at 5600 North Braeswood Boulevard has a lobby with twelve needlepoints. The design of these needlepoints had inspiration in the Hadassah Medical Center's Chagall windows. The current synagogue facility has been expanded since its initial construction in order to house a Jewish school.

The Shlenker School is on the synagogue property. The school is accredited by the Independent Schools Association of the Southwest.

During the COVID-19 pandemic in Texas, as of 2022, more students attended The Shlenker School than previously. An organization called Prizmah stated in a 2021 report that families with a preference for education in a school setting during a pandemic, as opposed to via the internet, often preferred schools that continued offering such.

=== Cemetery ===
The cemetery owned by Congregation Beth Israel is the oldest Jewish cemetery in Houston.

Congregation Beth Israel owns and operates two cemeteries. Its historic West Dallas cemetery, founded in 1844, is located at 1201 West Dallas, just west of downtown Houston. The West Dallas cemetery includes the Temple of Rest Mausoleum, an iconic Art Deco structure designed by architect Joseph Finger. The hallmarks of this building are the exquisite stained-glass windows, the bronze iron work and the beautiful chandelier in the entry way. The other cemetery is located on 1111 Antoine Drive, in west Houston, just north of I-10. The Antoine cemetery was recently expanded and includes a columbarium.

== Notable members ==
- Josh Wolf (born 2000), baseball player in the Cleveland Indians organization and for Team Israel

== Gallery ==
Texas Historic Landmark marker at the former synagogue site

== See also ==
- History of the Jews in Houston
