= Jewish Herald-Voice =

- Front page, December 7, 2023
- Type: Weekly newspaper
- Founder: Edgar Goldberg
- Publisher: Vicki Samuels Levy
- President: Matt Samuels
- Founded: 1908
- Language: English
- City: Houston, Texas
- Country: United States
- Circulation: 40,000+ (as of 2023)
- Website: jhvonline.com

The Jewish Herald-Voice is a weekly community newspaper serving the Jewish community of Houston and the Texas Gulf Coast for more than 115 years.

The newspaper is the longest-running Jewish paper in the Southwest. Commonly known as the JHV or The Herald, the newspaper has a readership of more than 40,000.

The JHV publishes 52 weekly editions a year, 10 special sections and five magazines, including Passover, Rosh Hashanah, Chanukah, Celebrations and VOICES in Houston. The JHV also has a website and e-edition, as well as social media pages on Facebook, X, Instagram and YouTube.

The Jewish Herald-Voice is run by the Samuels family. Vicki Samuels Levy is the owner, publisher/editor and Matt Samuels is the chief of operations.

== History ==
The Jewish Herald-Voice was established in 1908 by Edgar Goldberg, later purchased by David White and purchased by its current publishers, the Samuels family, in 1973.

Joseph Samuels (December 10, 1915 – January 19, 2011) served as the paper's publisher after he and his wife Jeanne (née Franklin) acquired the publication in 1973. In 2023, after the passing of Jeanne (December 26, 1923 - May 12, 2023), her daughter, Vicky Samuels Levy became owner, editor and publisher.

There are currently three generations of the Samuels family representing the newspaper: Vicki Samuels Duke Levy (CEO, Publisher), Matt Samuels (Chief of Operations) and Cameron Samuels, who is a contributing writer and photographer.

On April 1, 2008, the newspaper celebrated the 100th anniversary. The celebration included a revisit to older issues and a remark from Congressman Gene Green in the Congressional Record.

Upon the passing of Joseph Samuels in 2011, Jeanne took the helm of the newspaper in publishing and editing. On March 14, 2011, the 82nd Texas Legislature honored Joseph Samuels' life and dedication to the Texas Jewish community in passing House Resolution 485 by Rep. Sarah Davis, Sen. Borris Miles, and Rep. Scott Hochberg.

== Awards ==
The JHV has received more than 100 awards over the past decade from the American Jewish Press Association, Texas Press Association and Texas Gulf Coast Press Association for its writing, photography, design and website. For judging during the 2020 calendar year during the start of the COVID-19 Pandemic, the JHV won 18 awards in more than eight categories.

== Other Notes ==
Last updated in 1992, the New York Public Library has held microfilm copies of the newspaper dating back to 1938 during World War II. Since then, the University of Texas at Austin, the University of California at Los Angeles, Houston Public Library, and Texas Newspaper Project have also been holding original copies and microfilm of the newspaper dating back to World War II.

In 2001, a group of volunteers from the Greater Houston Jewish Genealogical Society began indexing all "life-cycle information" — announcements of births, engagements, marriages, deaths, and burials — for use in historical and genealogical projects. As of August, 2011, the index database included all events from the beginning of the paper's publication through June 2011.

The front page of the newspaper was redesigned in 2018 to feature a larger cover photo rather than the traditional newspaper layout of story previews.

== See also ==
- History of the Jews in Houston
