= Shimon Lazaroff =

Rabbi Shimon Lazaroff is the current Texas Regional Director for Texas Friends of Chabad Lubavitch, Inc. (a.k.a. Head Shliach for Chabad Lubavitch of Texas) and member of the board and executive committee of Agudas Chasidei Chabad. With the direction of the Lubavitcher Rebbe, Rabbi Menachem Mendel Schneerson, he established Chabad Lubavitch in Texas upon his arrival with his family in 1972.

== Early life ==
Lazaroff was born in the former Soviet Union where his grandfather, Shimon Lazaroff, was the Hasidic Chief Rabbi of Leningrad. Rabbi Lazaroff received his early education in Paris, France. He later studied at the Chabad Talmudical Academy in Lod, Israel. While in Israel, he began to be active in Youth Leadership work. Arriving in this country in 1958, he attended the Central Lubavitcher Yeshiva Tomchei Temimim at 770 Eastern Parkway in New York City. During the summer seasons he traveled as a special delegate of the Lubavitch Youth Organizations to all parts of the United States doing missionary work, including Missouri and Washington State. In 1962 he was chosen as emissary to Europe to encourage orthodox Judaism in Jewish communities and on college campuses. This work took him to various parts of France, Scandinavia and England. He received his ordination from the Central Lubavitcher Yeshiva, after performing well in Talmudic studies, Rabbinical literature and Chabad Chassidic philosophy. Following two years of post-graduate work, he was ordained as Rabbinical judge. He was active, prior to his arrival in Texas, in religious outreach on many college campuses as part of the Lubavitch Youth Organization's College and University Council's activity for Jewish college youth, and occupied administrative posts in Lubavitch run youth groups and camps.

From 1967-1972, he resided in Detroit, Michigan, where he was spiritual leader and executive director of the Gan Israel Camping Network for the Midwestern United States.

== Texas life ==
Arriving in Houston, Texas, in 1972, Rabbi Shimon Lazaroff and Rebbetzin Chiena Lazaroff (née Schapiro), have facilitated expansive growth of Chabad branches and activities in Texas. In Houston since Rabbi Lazaroff’s arrival, in particular, there has been an increase in the number of orthodox and Hassidic Jewish families. Outreach to non-Orthodox Jews continues as a core part of the Lubavitch philosophy.

Rabbi Lazaroff is director of the Chabad Lubavitch Center in Houston, the central campus of Texas Lubavitch activities. Chabad Lubavitch Center includes a synagogue, Torah Day School of Houston, Camp Gan Israel, Chabad Hebrew School, Community Collel and Mikveh Taharas Yisroel. At the Thirtieth Anniversary Founders' Dinner, Lazaroff announced a plan to expand the facility with a significant building renovation project.

Lazaroff is Rav Hamachsir of Mehadrin Kashrus of Texas created for local community members and out-of-town visitors who seek adherence to a Hassidic standard of adherence to kosher laws in local kosher establishments.

To date he has supervised the establishment of Chabad Houses in Houston, Arlington, College Station, Dallas-Fort Worth, El Paso, Pearland, Plano, San Antonio and Austin. These centers provide the Jewish communities with Jewish Day Schools, Jewish educational resources, holiday awareness, Hebrew schools, day camps, mikvehs and prison chaplaincy programs for outreach to prisoners.
