= Cheng Ho Mosque =

Mosques named after Cheng Ho

Cheng Ho Mosque may refer to:

- Cheng Ho Mosque (Banyuwangi), a mosque in Banyuwangi, Indonesia.
- Cheng Ho Mosque (Batam), a mosque in Batam, Indonesia.
- Cheng Ho Mosque (Jember), a mosque in Jember, Indonesia.
- Cheng Ho Mosque (Surabaya), a mosque in Surabaya, Indonesia.
- Cheng Ho Mosque (Palembang), a mosque in Palembang, Indonesia.
- Cheng Ho Mosque (Pasuruan), a mosque in Pasuruan Regency, Indonesia.
- Cheng Ho Mosque (Purbalingga), a mosque in Purbalingga Regency, Indonesia
- Taipei Cheng Ho Mosque, the largest and oldest mosque in Taiwan located in Taipei City.
