= Consulate General of Indonesia, New York =

Consulate General of the Republic of Indonesia in New York Konsulat Jenderal Republik Indonesia di New York

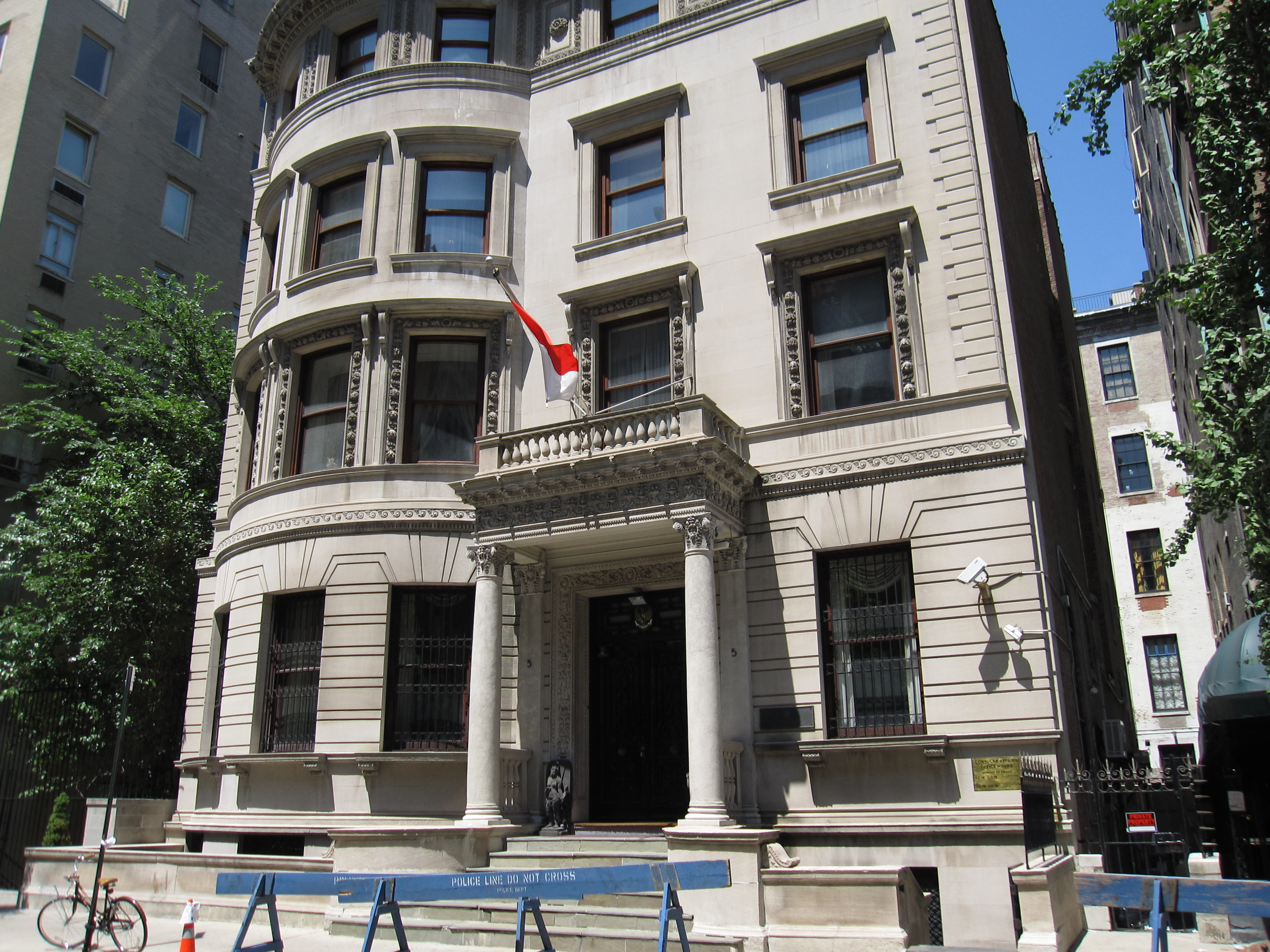
- Location: New York City, United States
- Address: 5 East 68th Street; New York City 10065
- Coordinates: 40°46′11″N 73°58′05″W
- Opened: 1951
- Jurisdiction: 15 U.S. States: Connecticut; Delaware; Maine; Maryland; Massachusetts; New Hampshire; New Jersey; New York; North Carolina; Pennsylvania; Rhode Island; South Carolina; Vermont; Virginia; West Virginia
- Consul General: Arifi Salman
- Website: kemlu.go.id/newyork

Consulate General of the Republic of Indonesia in New York (Indonesian: Konsulat Jenderal Republik Indonesia di New York) is a consular mission of Indonesia in New York City, New York, United States. The consulate general provides consular services to 15 U.S. states, mainly on the East Coast of the United States: Connecticut, Delaware, Maine, Maryland, Massachusetts, New Hampshire, New Jersey, New York, North Carolina, Pennsylvania, Rhode Island, South Carolina, Vermont, Virginia, and West Virginia.

The consular office was opened in 1951 and was originally located in Rockefeller Center. In May 1965, the office moved to its current address on 5 East 68th Street at the Upper East Side.

== List of consuls general ==
The following are Indonesian diplomats that served as Consul General in New York:

- R. Achmad Natanegara, 1953–
- Kwee Djie Hoo, 1957–1960
- R. Soesanto Djojosoegito, 1960
- R. Tjahjana Natadiningrat, 1964–
- Jusuf Ramh, c. 1969
- Trihardjo, 1976–
- M. Daoed Gade, 1979–
- Rudy Lengkong, 1983–
- Janus Jozef Pitoy, 1987–
- Arkelaus Ngantung Pantow, 1990–
- Is Isnaedi, 1994–
- I Gusti Ngurah Swetja, 1999–
- Kristio Wahyono, c. 2004
- Trie Edi Mulyani, 2007–2010
- Ghafur Akbar Dharmaputra, 2012–
- Abdul Kadir Jaelani, 2016–2019
- Arifi Saiman, 2019–2022
- Winanto Adi, 2022–Incumbent

== See also ==
- Indonesia–United States relations
- Embassy of Indonesia, Washington, D.C.
- Consulate General of Indonesia, Houston
- List of diplomatic missions of Indonesia
