= Indonesia–United States relations =

- Indonesia: United States

Diplomatic mission
- Indonesian Embassy, Washington, D.C.: United States Embassy, Jakarta

Envoy
- Ambassador Indroyono Soesilo: Chargé d'affaires Joy Michiko Sakurai

Indonesia and the United States established diplomatic relations on 28 December 1949. Relations are generally strong and close. Both are republics and recognize the strategic importance of their counterpart.

The Indonesian people have generally viewed the U.S. fairly positively, with 61% of Indonesians viewing the U.S. favorably in 2002, declining slightly down to 54% in 2011, increasing to 59% in 2014, and increasing further to 62% in 2015 (compared to only 26% who had an unfavorable view). Indonesian views of the U.S. declined significantly during the Trump administration, with 43% of Indonesians viewing the U.S. positively in 2018 (a near 20 point drop from the end of Barack Obama's term) compared to 42% who viewed the U.S. negatively.

In 2026, the U.S. and Indonesia agreed to deepen their defense ties.

== History ==
=== Before Indonesian Independence ===
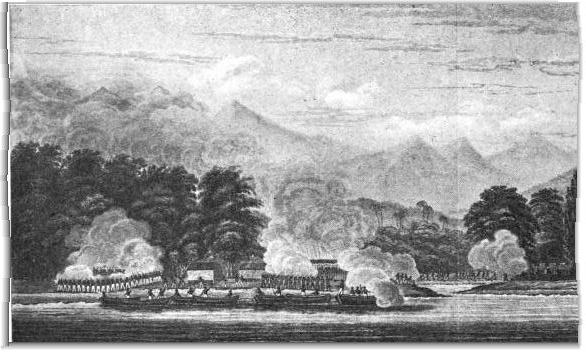
U.S. naval attack on Kuala Batee, Aceh. Sumatra island, 1832

In 1831, the natives living in the village of Kuala Batee, Aceh (located on the island of Sumatra, then part of the Dutch East Indies) massacred the crew of a U.S. merchant ship. This led to the punitive First Sumatran Expedition, during which U.S. and Dutch troops raided the settlement.

The U.S. Navy returned to Sumatra during the Second Sumatran Expedition, launched in response to an attack on another U.S. merchant ship by Malay pirates.

=== After Indonesian Independence ===
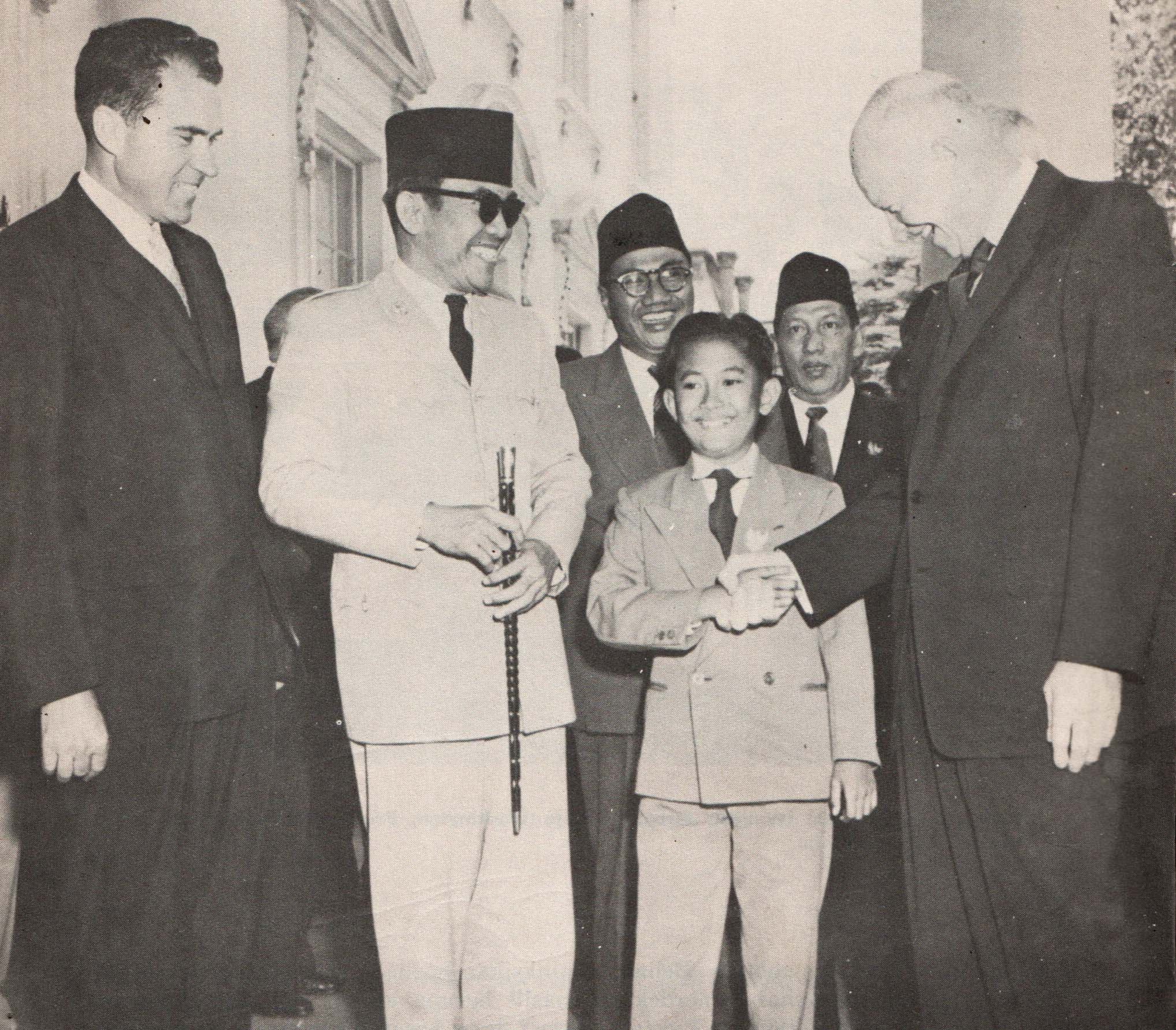
VP Richard Nixon and President Sukarno (right) watches as President Dwight Eisenhower shakes hands with Guntur Sukarnoputra, 1956

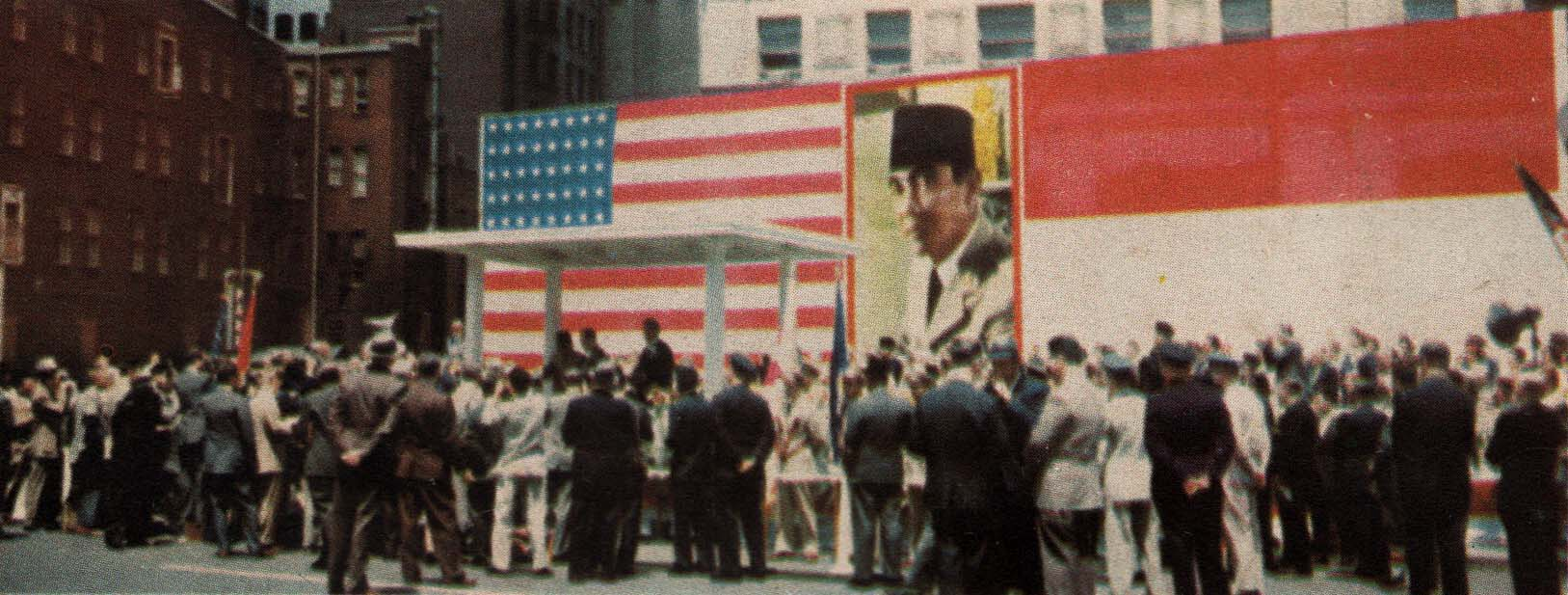
Stage and speech for President Sukarno on Pennsylvania Avenue in 1956

The United States played a major role in demanding Indonesian independence in the late 1940s. The Cold War played a critical role as the Indonesian Republic conclusively demonstrated its willingness and ability to suppress internal communist movements, as directed by the Comintern. U.S. policy since the 1940s has been to support Indonesia and help it avoid communism and was the primary provider of armaments. After Japan, Indonesia was the largest pro-U.S. nation in Asia. It hosted American investments in petroleum and raw materials and controlled a highly strategic location near vital shipping lanes.

The Dutch attempted to regain control of Indonesia after the surrender of Japan. However, under the Japanese occupation, a new nationalist government had arisen that resisted the Netherlands, leading to a four-year armed and diplomatic conflict. The U.S. took the lead in the United Nations demanding a Dutch withdrawal and Washington threatened to cut off Marshall plan aid. Indonesia gained full independence from the Netherlands in 1949. Indonesia nationalized more than a thousand Dutch companies, and nine out of 10 of the Dutch residents returned to the Netherlands, along with thousands of pro-Dutch Indonesians. Although considered a triumph of nationalism, it resulted in a prolonged economic depression due to the country's lack of capital and managerial skills. Indonesia helped sponsor the Non-Aligned Movement along with India and Yugoslavia to assert its independence from both the U.S. and the Soviet Union. When Indonesia started selling rubber to Communist China in the mid-1950s, the Eisenhower administration protested and persuaded Jakarta to cease the sales, allowing friendly relations to resume.

In February 1958, rebels in Sumatra and Sulawesi declared the PRRI-Permesta Movement aimed at overthrowing the Jakarta government. Due to their anti-communist rhetoric, the rebels received money, weapons, and manpower from the CIA. This support ended when Allen Lawrence Pope, an American pilot, was shot down after a bombing raid on government-held Ambon in April 1958. In April 1958, the central government responded by launching airborne and seaborne military invasions on Padang and Manado, the rebel capitals. By the end of 1958, the rebels had been militarily defeated, and the last remaining rebel guerrilla bands surrendered in August 1961.

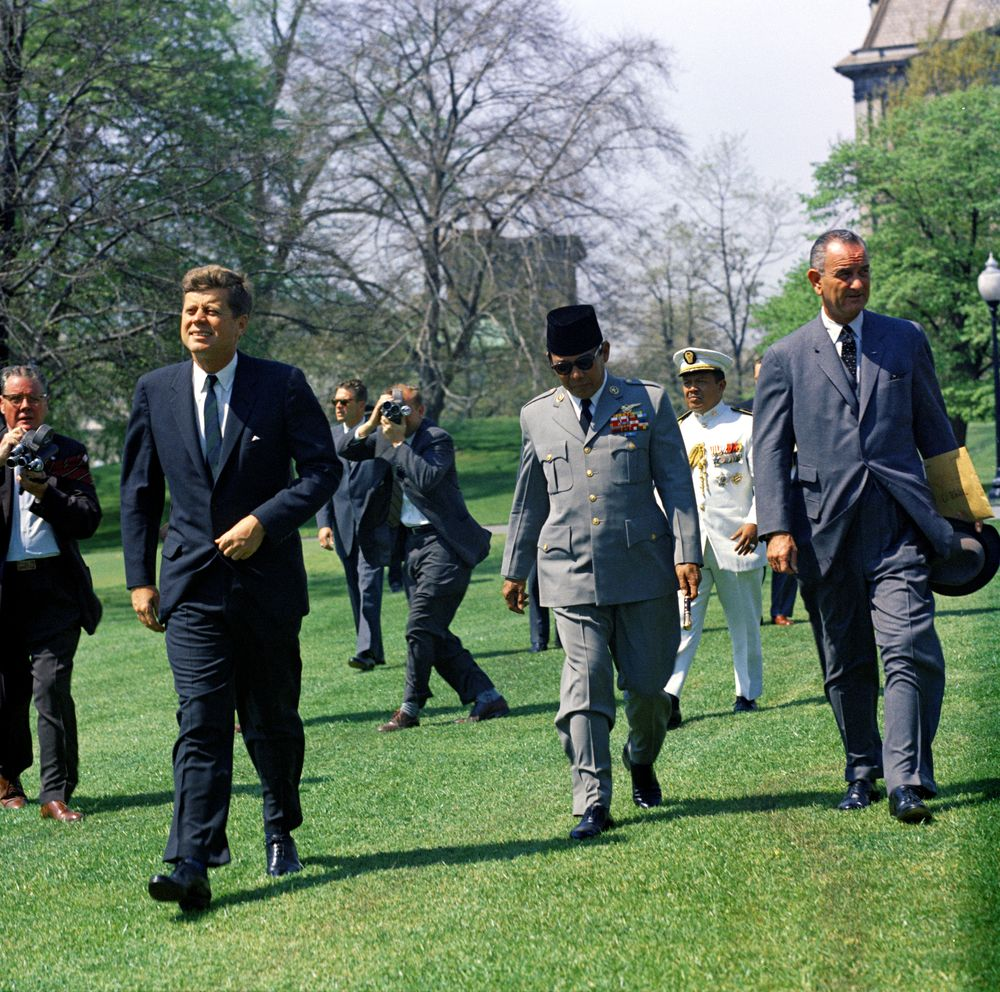
President Sukarno (center) with President John F. Kennedy (left) and VP Lyndon B. Johnson (right) in 1961.

The U.S. under President John F. Kennedy intervened in the West New Guinea dispute between Indonesia and the Netherlands, due to Indonesia's purchase of Soviet arms and planned invasion of the territory. U.S. diplomat Ellsworth Bunker brokered the New York Agreement, which eventually ceded West New Guinea to Indonesia in 1969 after a controversial referendum. The administration of Lyndon B. Johnson escalated the war in Vietnam, which greatly heightened tensions with Indonesia in 1964–65. Relations deteriorated further with Indonesia's opposition to the formation of Malaysia that led to war. By mid-1965, Sukarno was edging closer to China, denounced U.S. imperialism, and inspired anti-American demonstrations. Following an attempted coup on September 30, 1965, and the ensuing massacres of communists, the pro-Western Suharto came to power in 1968, and the U.S. started providing financial and military aid to Indonesia.

=== East Timor crisis: 1975–2002 ===
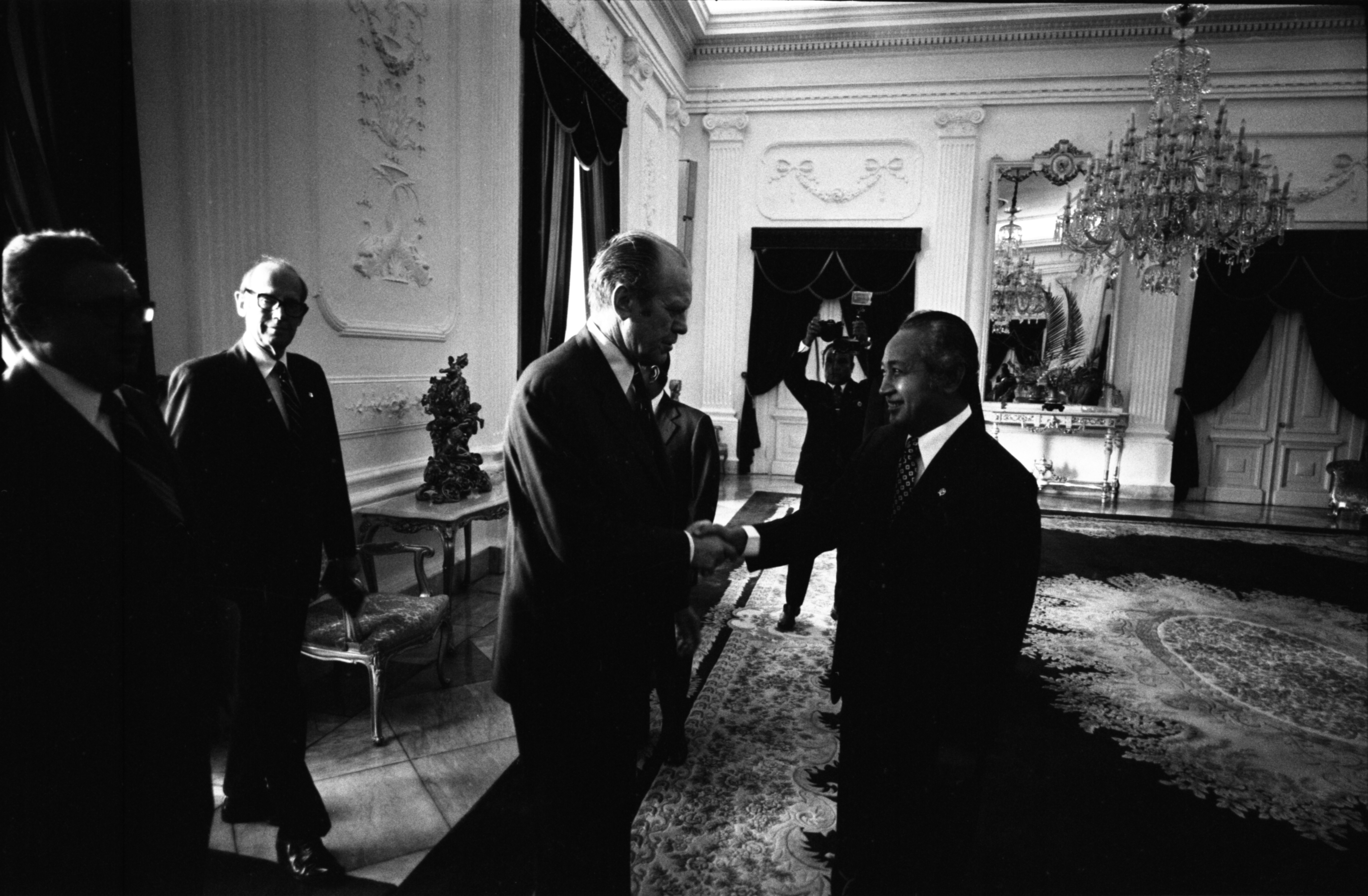
President Suharto with U.S. President Gerald Ford and Secretary of State Henry Kissinger in Jakarta, 6 December 1975

The victory of left-wing Fretilin in a civil war in East Timor caused alarm in Indonesia, which feared a hostile left-wing base that would promote secessionist movements within Indonesia. Anti-Fretilin activists from the other main parties fled to West Timor, a part of Indonesia, and called upon Jakarta to annex the former Portuguese colony. On December 6, 1975, Ford and Kissinger met Indonesian President Suharto in Jakarta and indicated the U.S. would not take a position on East Timor. Indonesia invaded the next day and made East Timor its 27th province. The United Nations, with U.S. support, called for the withdrawal of the Indonesian forces. The 25-year Indonesian occupation of East Timor was characterized by continuous and violent clashes between separatist groups (especially Fretilin) and the Indonesian military. It was not until 1999 that Indonesia relinquished control of East Timor following an Australian-led international intervention. East Timor later became an independent country in 2002.

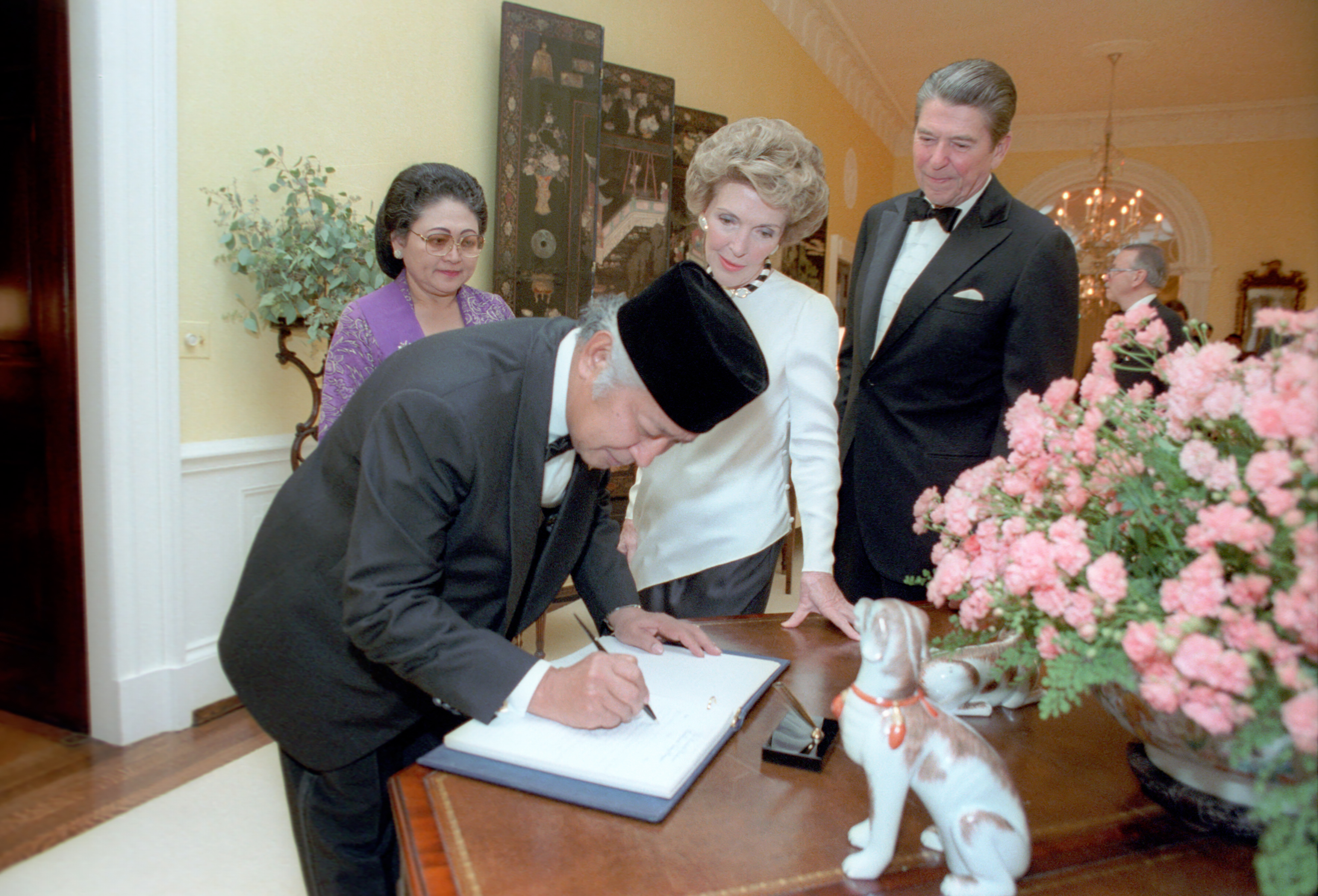
President Suharto with U.S. President Ronald Reagan in Washington, D.C. on 12 October 1982

Recent research into newly opened documents indicates that anti-communism was not the main reason for Western support of Indonesia's takeover of East Timor. Analysts in Washington and NATO concluded that East Timor was too small and too unstable to survive on its own. Furthermore, there was a clear need to maintain friendly relations with Indonesia due to its growing size and importance in a critical region. Following the invasion, U.S. military aid averaged about $30 million annually throughout the occupation of East Timor, and arms sales increased exponentially under President Jimmy Carter. This policy continued until 1999 when President Bill Clinton was outraged by Indonesia's defiance of East Timor referendum results that heavily favored independence.

=== Since 2000 ===
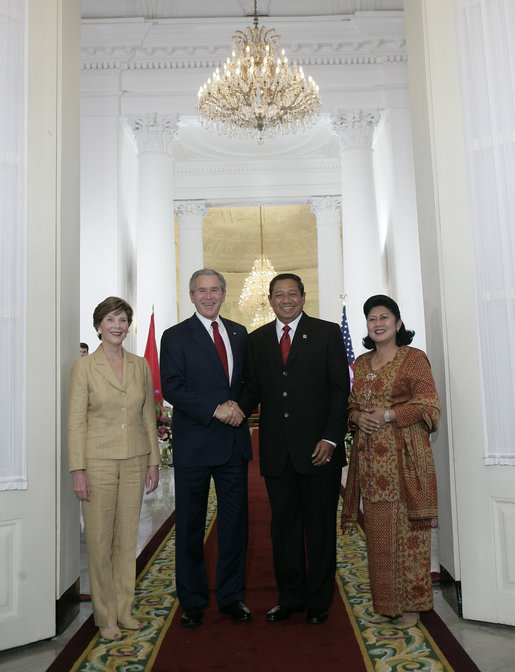
President Yudhoyono and his wife Ani Yudhoyono greeted US President George W. Bush and his wife Laura Bush at the Bogor Palace in Bogor, November 2006.

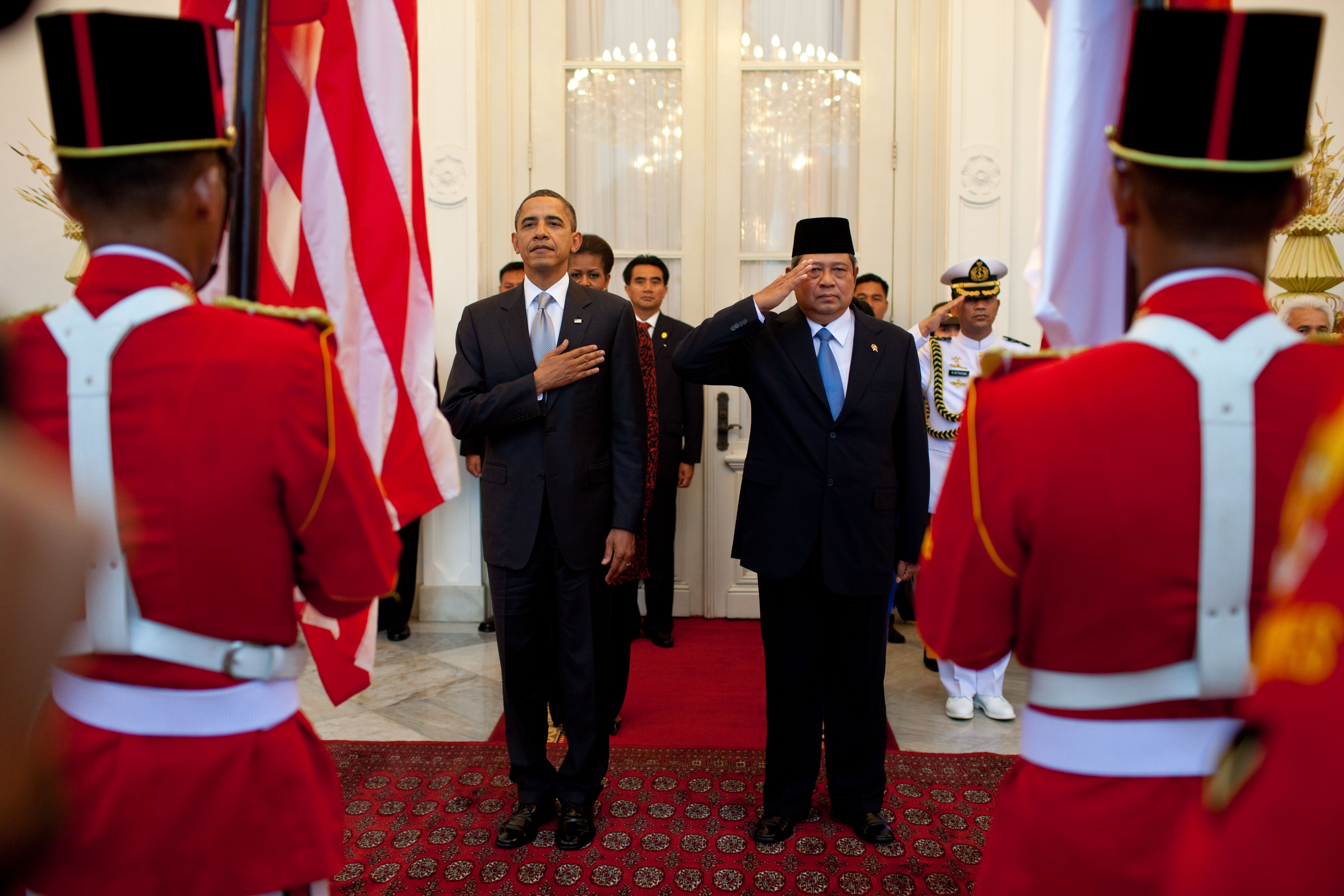
President Barack Obama and President Susilo Bambang Yudhoyono participate in the arrival ceremony at the Merdeka Palace in Jakarta, Indonesia (November 9, 2010)

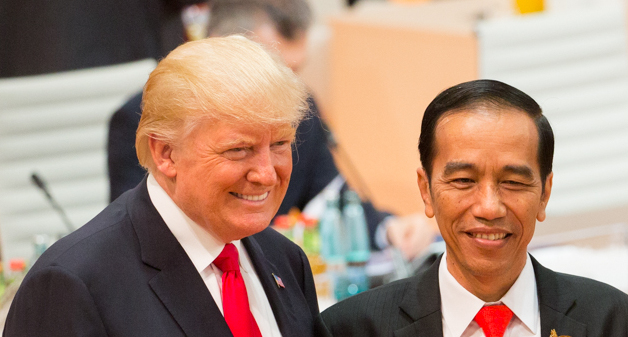
President Widodo and U.S. President Donald Trump, 8 July 2017

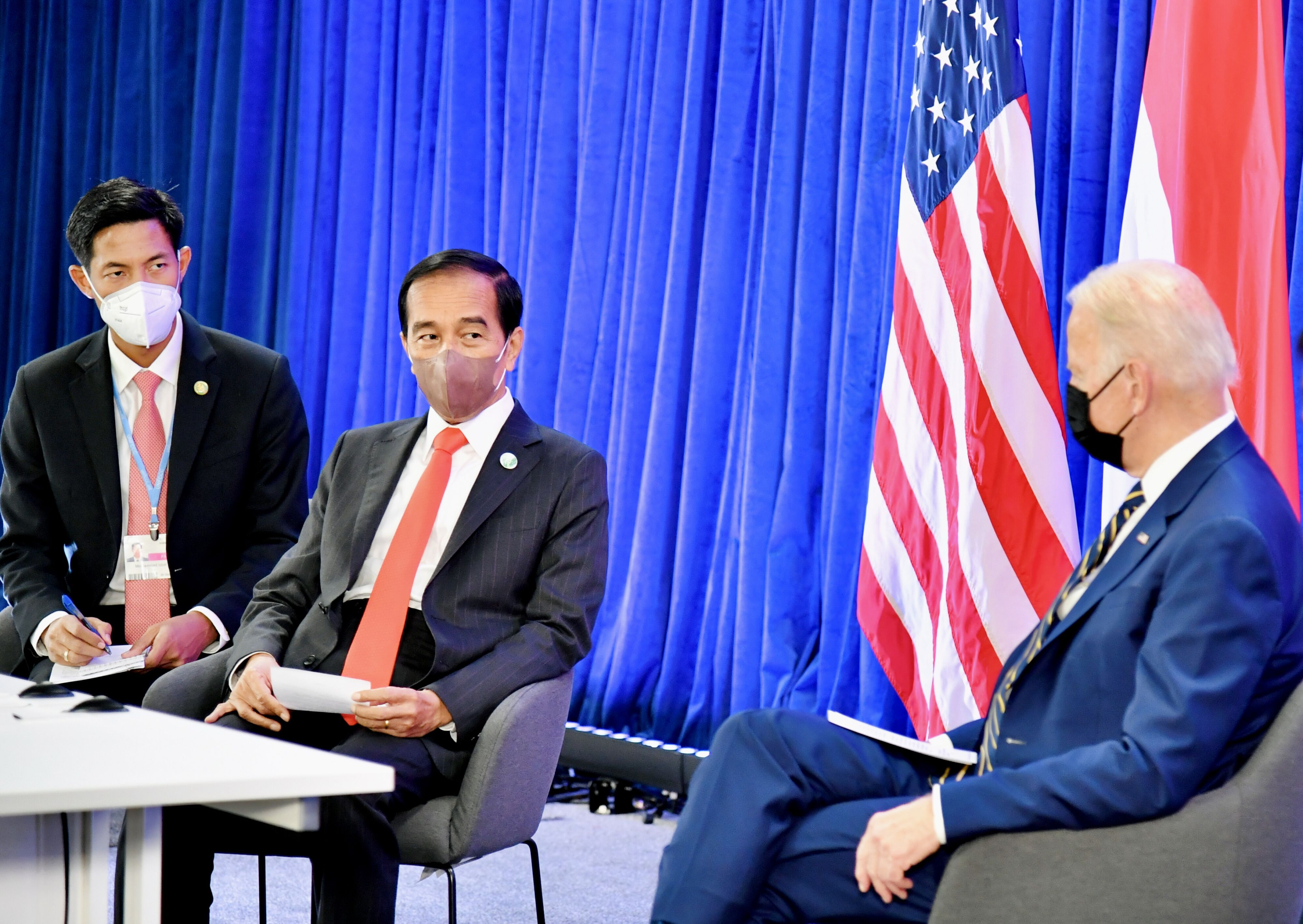
President Widodo and U.S. President Joe Biden, 1 November 2021

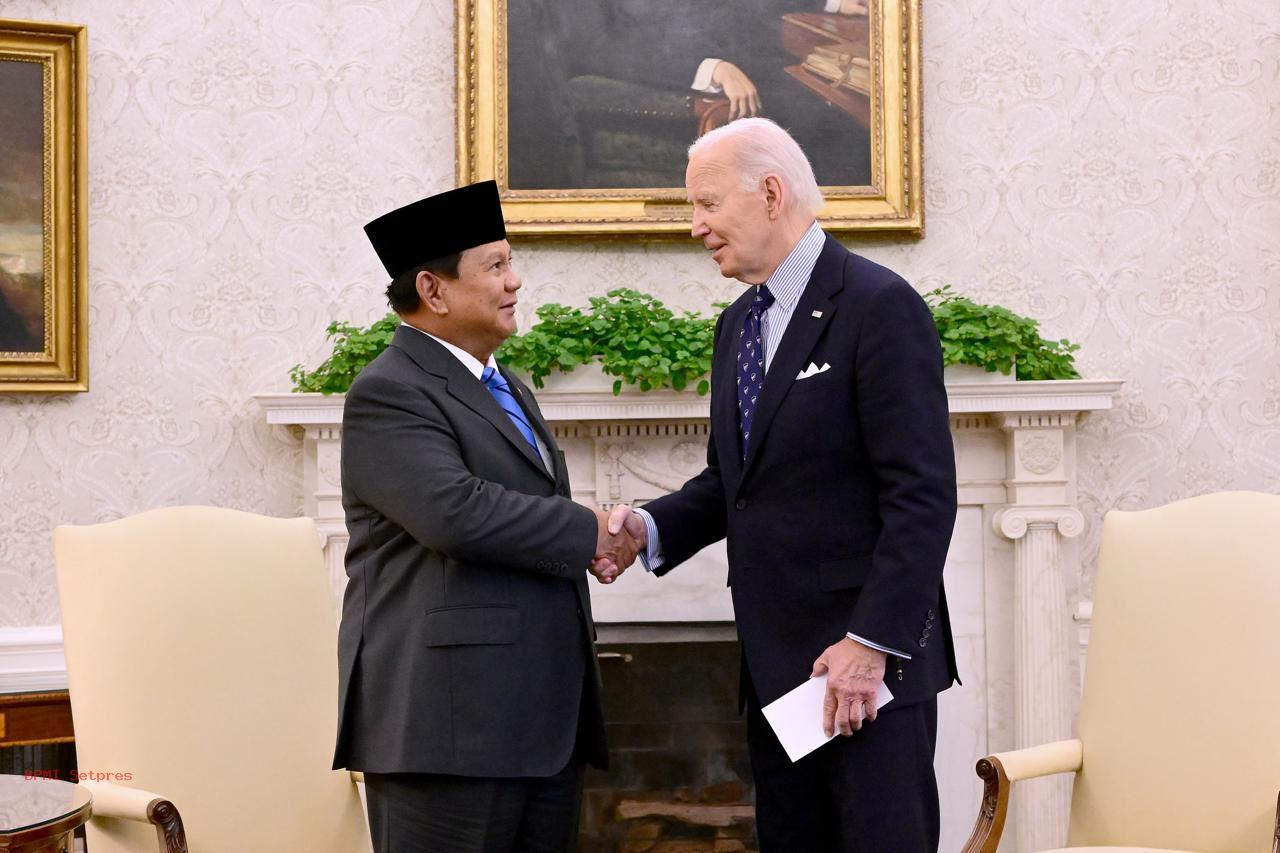
President Joe Biden meets with President Prabowo Subianto in November 2024

With the end of the Cold War in 1989 and the resolution of the East Timor crisis in 2000, relations between Indonesia and the U.S. have been untroubled. By 2000, relations reached an all-time high. Rapprochement was made successful by Indonesia's transition to democracy with free elections, and its effective counter-terrorism strategies. The George W. Bush administration claimed a part of the credit by arguing that the Bush doctrine advocated democracy as an antidote to terrorism, and Indonesia's experience vindicated the doctrine. The Barack Obama administration celebrates shared democratic values and interests and recognizes Indonesia's increasingly influential role in world affairs. Efforts by 2010 were underway for the two countries to create a 'Comprehensive Partnership Agreement' (CPA) encompassing enhanced security, economic and educational engagement, as well as cooperation on transnational issues such as climate change.

The United States has significant economic, commercial, and security interests in Indonesia. It remains a linchpin of regional security due to its strategic location astride several vital international maritime straits, particularly the Malacca Strait. Relations between Indonesia and the U.S. are generally positive and have advanced since the election of President Susilo Bambang Yudhoyono in 2004.

Cooperative relations are maintained today, although no formal security treaties bind the two countries. The U.S. and Indonesia share the common goal of maintaining peace, security, and stability in the region and engaging in a dialogue on threats to regional security. Cooperation between the U.S. and Indonesia on counter-terrorism has increased steadily since 2002, as terrorist attacks in Bali (October 2002 and October 2005), Jakarta (August 2003 and September 2004) and other regional locations demonstrated the presence of terrorist organizations, principally Jemaah Islamiyah, in Indonesia. The U.S. has welcomed Indonesia's contributions to regional security, especially its leading role in helping restore democracy in Cambodia and in mediating territorial disputes in the South China Sea.

The U.S. is committed to consolidating Indonesia's democratic transition and supports the territorial integrity of the country. Nonetheless, there are friction points in the bilateral relations. These conflicts have centered primarily on human rights, as well as on differences in foreign policy. The U.S. Congress cut off military training assistance through International Military Education and Training (IMET) to Indonesia in 1992 in response to a November 12, 1991 incident in East Timor when Indonesian security forces shot and killed East Timorese demonstrators. This restriction was partially lifted in 1995. Military assistance programs were again suspended, however, in the aftermath of the violence and destruction in East Timor following the August 30, 1999 referendum favoring independence.

Separately, the U.S. had urged the Indonesian government to identify and bring to justice the perpetrators of the August 2002 ambush murders of two U.S. teachers near Timika, Papua. In 2005, the Secretary of State certified that Indonesian cooperation in the murder investigation had met the conditions set by Congress, enabling the resumption of full IMET. Eight suspects were arrested in January 2006, and in November 2006 seven were convicted.

In November 2005, the Under Secretary of State for Political Affairs, under authority delegated by the Secretary of State, exercised a National Security Waiver provision provided in the FY 2005 Foreign Operations Appropriations Act to remove congressional restrictions on Foreign Military Financing (FMF) and lethal defense articles. These actions represented a reestablishment of normalized military relations, allowing the U.S. to provide more substantial support for Indonesian efforts to reform the military, increase its ability to respond to national and regional disasters, and promote regional stability.

In November 2023, Indonesia and the US announced a Joint Comprehensive Strategic Partnership. In November 2024 US President elect Donald Trump said that Indonesian President Prabowo was "very respected" as the two spoke during Prabowo's first visit to the US after being elected Indonesian President.

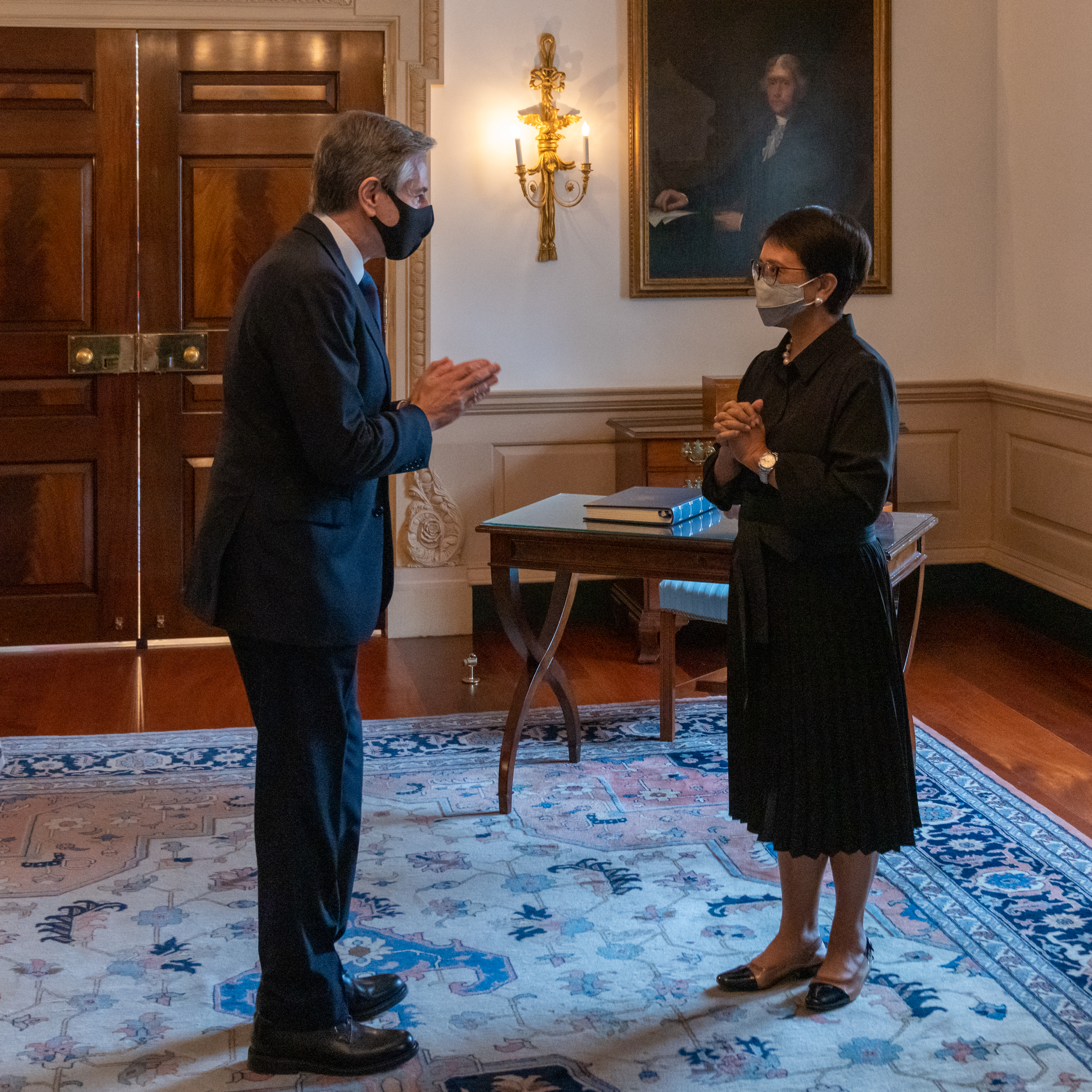
U.S. Secretary of State Antony Blinken meets with Indonesian Foreign Minister Retno Marsudi in Washington D.C. in August 2021

In April 2025, the Trump administration threatened Indonesia with 32% tariffs on all Indonesian goods, effective on August 1. However, on 22 July 2025, President Trump announced that the United States and Indonesia had agreed to terms on the framework of a trade agreement. Indonesian goods exported to the United States would be reduced to a 19% tariff. According to Trump, Indonesia agreed to decrease their tariffs on US goods and to purchase US energy worth 1.5 billion USD, US agricultural products worth 4.5 billion USD, and 50 Boeing aircraft.

== Development assistance ==
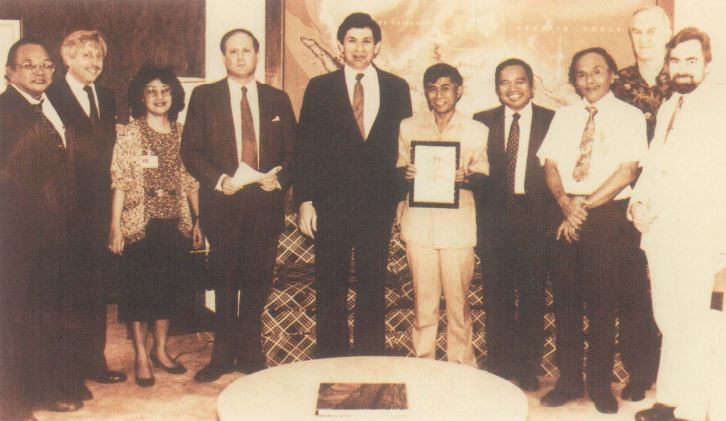
U.S. Ambassador to Indonesia Paul Wolfowitz and USAID Mission Director David Merrill presented a plaque to Suardi Sumadiwangsa, the 10,000th Indonesian to participate in USAID's Overseas Training Program in 1987.

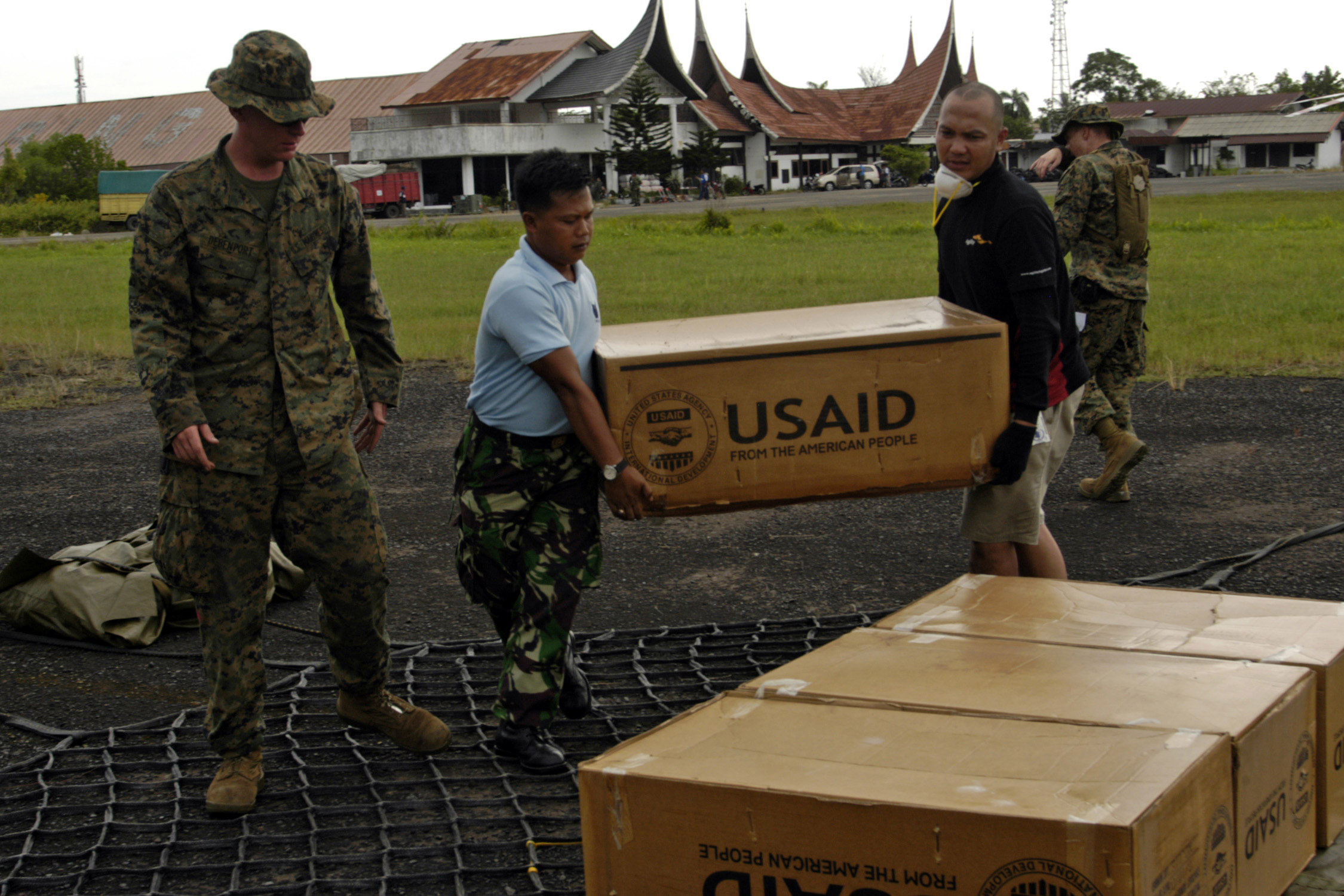
Workers loading a cargo net of supplies from USAID following the 2009 Sumatra earthquakes

The U.S. Agency for International Development (USAID) and its predecessors have provided development assistance to Indonesia since 1950. Initial assistance focused on the most urgent needs of the new republic, including food aid, infrastructure rehabilitation, health care, and training. For thirty years, between 1967 and 2007, U.S. aid to Indonesia was provided within the arrangements of, first, the Inter-Governmental Group on Indonesia, and later the Consultative Group on Indonesia. Through the 1970s, a time of enormous economic growth in Indonesia, USAID played a significant role in helping the country achieve self-sufficiency in rice production and in reducing the birth rate. As of 2024, USAID assistance programs focus on primary education, democratic, local governance, helping the legislative and judiciary, the rebuilding after the 2004 tsunami, economic growth, health, water, food, and the environment.

However, in March 2025, USAID was cancelled by the US government's program of DOGE.

The following was originally copied and pasted from USAID's website, which has now since been deleted, however, one source is found {{here}}.

Improving the quality of decentralized education

In October 2003, President Bush announced a $157 million Indonesian Education Initiative for 2004–2009 to improve the quality of education in Indonesia. This initiative is a cornerstone of the U.S. Government assistance program in Indonesia, directly responding to Indonesia's priorities and reflecting a joint Indonesia-U.S. commitment to revitalize education for the next generation of Indonesia's leaders.

Managing basic education (MBE)

Since 2003, this project has worked with local governments to strengthen their capacity to effectively manage primary education services in 20 districts/municipalities in East and Central Java, Aceh, and Jakarta. MBE is also working with 10,000 educators to improve the quality of teaching and learning in grades 1–9 through in-service teacher training, community participation, and the promotion of school-based management. MBE directly reaches 450 schools, 20% of which are madrassah, and 140,000 students. Through dissemination of good practices, teachers from 2,000 additional schools received training last year.

Decentralized basic education (DBE)

The Indonesia Education Initiative will increase the quality of basic education in primary and junior secondary schools, both public and private, and focus on three results: (DBE1) Local governments and communities more effectively manage education services; (DBE2) Enhance the quality of teaching and learning to improve student performance in critical subjects such as math, science, and reading; and (DBE3) Youth gain more relevant life and work skills to better compete for jobs in the future.

Opportunities for vulnerable children

This program promotes inclusive education in Indonesia. Children with special needs, such as visual impairment are provided with the opportunity to be educated in public schools. Replicable models are being developed to expand the reach of the program.

Sesame Street Indonesia

An Indonesian co-production of the award-winning television show targeting young children is being developed and produced by the Sesame Workshop in New York with local Indonesian partners and USAID funding. Millions of Indonesian children will be better equipped to start school. The first season of the show, titled Jalan Sesama, was first aired in 2008.

Media development

In October 2005, USAID funded a new media development project entitled "Building on the Foundations: Strengthening Professional, Responsible and Responsive Broadcast Media in Indonesia". The goal of the program is to build professional, information-based local media that are responsive to the development and reform of districts across Indonesia. The program assists local radio stations in North Sumatra, Aceh and Java, fostering dialogue on media regulations, and providing support for media and media education in Aceh.

Environmental services

This program supports better health through improved water resources management and expanded access to clean water and sanitation services. With a ridge to reef approach, partners improve water resource management from watershed sources, along rivers, through cities, and to coastal reefs. In the upper watershed, the program promotes forest management, biodiversity conservation, and land use planning to protect a steady, year-round source of clean water. Further downstream, the program strengthens municipal water utilities to improve and expand piped water and sanitation services to communities. Stakeholder forums link upstream and downstream communities to build consensus on water and waste management issues. Marginalized urban communities also benefit from the introduction of safe drinking water through Air Rahmat, a home chlorination product being introduced to the market through a public-private partnership.

=== At America ===
In December 2010, the United States reached out to the Indonesian youth by establishing @america, an interactive operation heralded as the digital-age successor to the venerable American Cultural Center. This is a recent initiative undertaken by American public diplomacy to present a more positive image of the country to foreign youth, especially in Muslim countries. @america represents the U.S. government's first attempt at creating a full-fledged cultural center since the September 11, 2001 attacks.

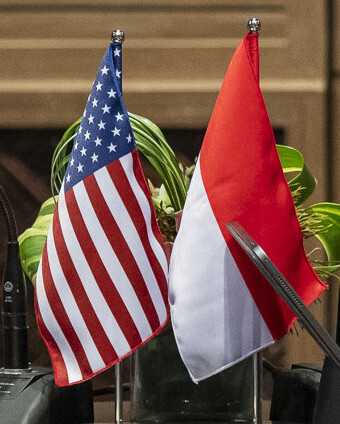
Flags of both nations

== Diplomatic missions ==
The U.S. embassy in Indonesia is located in Jakarta. There is a Consulate General in Surabaya headed by Consul General Christopher R. Green. This Consulate General leads the U.S. diplomatic mission in the 12 provinces of middle and eastern Indonesia.

There is also a U.S. Consulate in Medan headed by Principal Officer Bernard C. Uadan, and a U.S. Consular Agency in Denpasar.

The Indonesian embassy in the U.S. is located in Washington D.C., with consulate generals in New York, San Francisco, Los Angeles, Chicago and Houston.

=== Principal U.S. Embassy officials ===
- Chargé d'affaires a.i. – Joy Michiko Sakurai

== Military cooperation ==
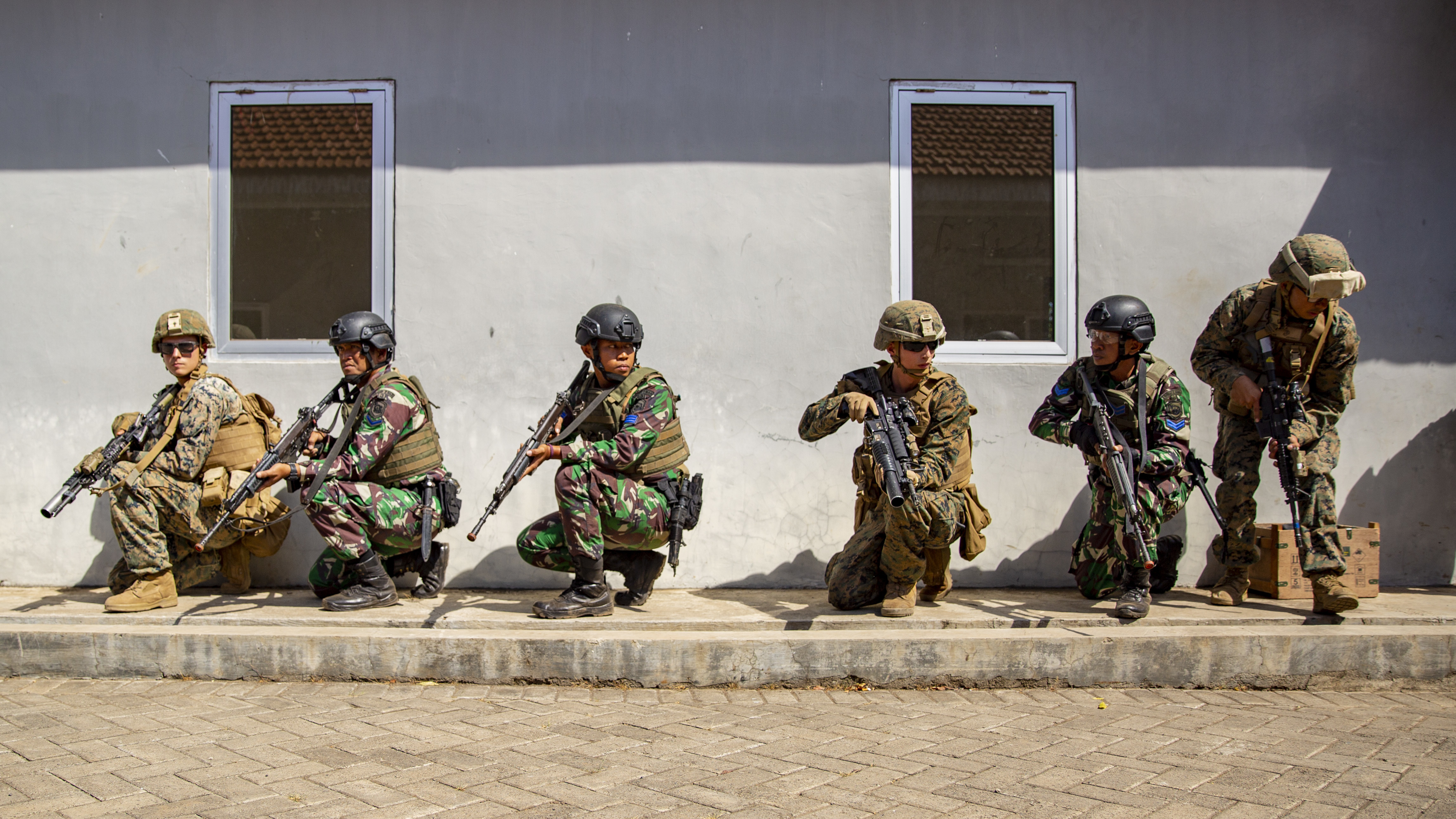
Indonesian and US forces participating in a platoon exchange program in 2019

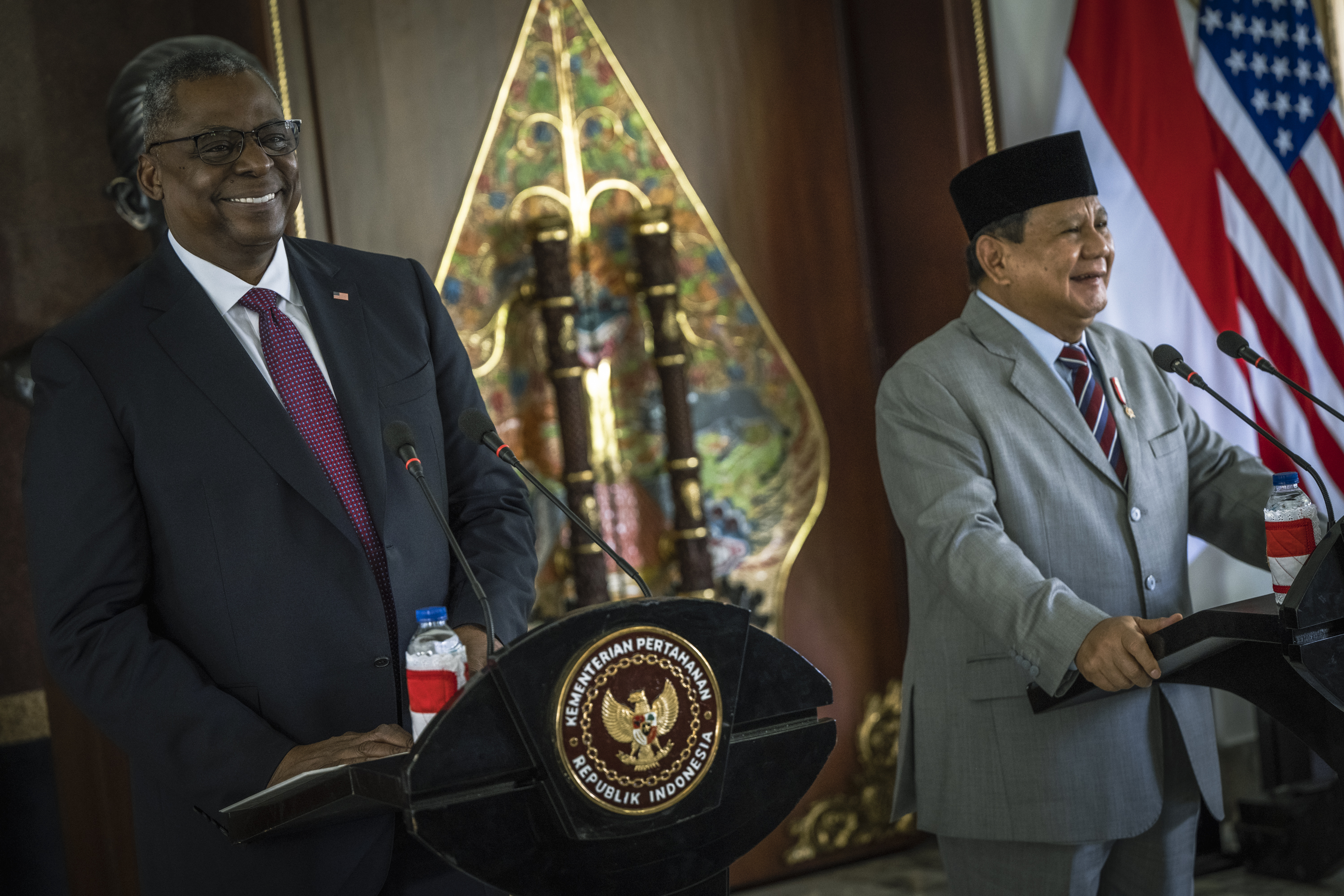
U.S. Secretary of Defense Lloyd Austin with Indonesian Defense Minister Prabowo Subianto in November 2021

In 2010, the United States lifted a ban on military contacts with Kopassus, an Indonesian special operations forces involved with human rights abuses in the 1990s.

In January 2018 visit to Jakarta, Secretary of Defense James Mattis stated that Indonesia was a maritime fulcrum in the Asia-Pacific region, and wanted Indonesia and the U.S. to cooperate on issues of maritime security. During that same visit, Secretary Mattis said he believed that Kopassus had reformed sufficiently to justify increased contact with the U.S.

In March 2020, the Trump administration pressured Indonesia into dropping deals to buy Russian made Sukhoi Su-35 fighter jets and Chinese made naval vessels. According to an official familiar with the matter, president Joko Widodo's administration was concerned that the US would take punitive actions on trade and implement economic sanctions against Indonesia if the deals were completed.

In April 2026, the U.S. and Indonesia pledged to deepen their defense ties with the announcement of a Major Defense Cooperation Partnership.

=== Military sales ===
The United States is a major supplier of military hardware to Indonesia, including of Boeing AH-64 Apache helicopters and the F-16 Fighting Falcon. As of January 2018, Indonesia is exploring purchasing an additional 48 F-16 aircraft, for as much as $4.5 billion.

In February 2022, US approved Indonesia's potential purchase of 36 F-15EX aircraft to replace Sukhoi Su-27 and Sukhoi Su-30. As of August 2023, Indonesia has signed a memorandum of understanding to purchase 24 F-15EX aircraft.

== Public opinion ==
According to a 2026 Pew Research Center survey, 29% of Indonesians had a favorable view of the United States, while 70% had a negative view.

== See also ==
- Indonesian Americans
- Foreign relations of the United States
- Foreign relations of Indonesia
- CIA activities in Indonesia
