= Lautze 2 Mosque =

Mosque in Bandung, West Java, Indonesia

- Masjid Lautze 2
- Location within Bandung

Religion
- Affiliation: Islam
- Branch/tradition: Sunni

Location
- Location: Bandung, West Java, Indonesia
- Interactive map of Lautze 2 Mosque
- Coordinates: 6°55′4.9″S 107°36′44.1″E

Architecture
- Type: mosque
- Style: Chinese
- Founder: Haji Abdul Karim Oei Foundation
- Established: 1997
- Capacity: 200 worshippers

The Lautze 2 Mosque (Indonesian: Masjid Lautze 2) is a mosque in Bandung, West Java, Indonesia.

== History ==
The mosque was established in 1997 by Haji Abdul Karim Oei Foundation by renting a building after the first Lautze Mosque was established in Jakarta. Later on, the landlord donated the building to the foundation. It has undergone three renovations in 2004, 2007 and 2012. In November 2016, the mosque committees underwent reshuffle.

== Architecture ==
The mosque was designed with Chinese architectural style. It is housed on a two-floor building which can accommodate up to 200 worshippers. The ground floor houses the main prayer hall and the upper floor houses a shelter for newly Muslim converts.

== Transportation ==
The mosque is accessible within walking distance east of Bandung Station of Kereta Api Indonesia.

== See also ==
- Islam in Indonesia
