= Tricia Sumarijanto =

Indonesian-born musicologist

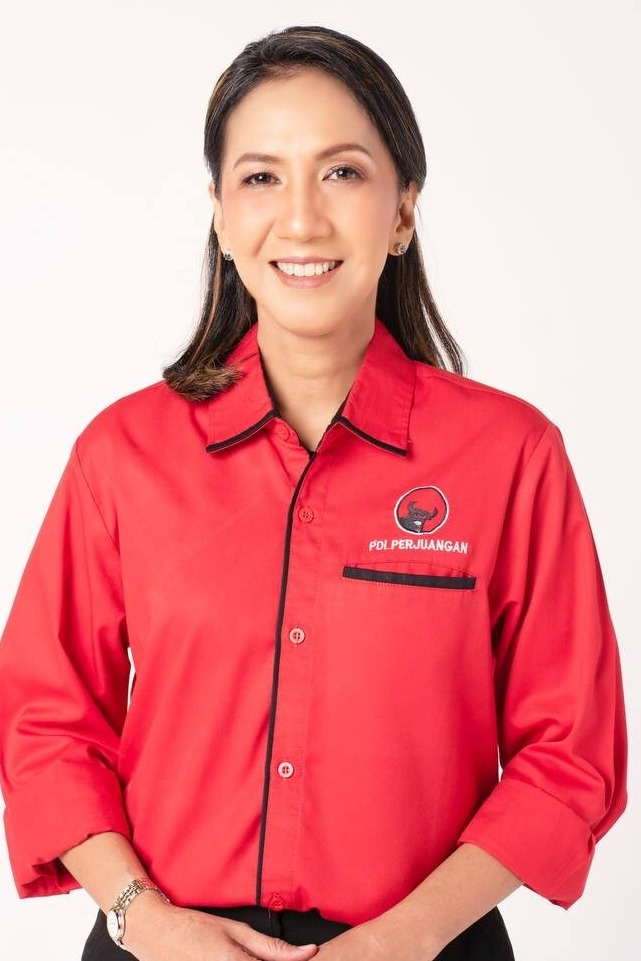

Tricia Lelonowati Sumarijanto is an Indonesian national born 29 December 1970, in Sydney, Australia. She is one of the only leading public figures in Angklung education in the United States, and is most well known for her work with House of Angklung, a community performance group in Washington DC with an extensive performance portfolio, network, and support from the Washington DC KBRI. Previously the group has performed in places including the World Bank, the Smithsonian, and the National Indonesian Diaspora Convention in New Orleans. In February and March 2017, Tricia personally provided a series of angklung instruction sessions for Yale students and members of the Yale community.

She is one of the co-founders of the 501(c)(3) non-profit organization Rumah Indonesia, based in Washington, DC, United States. She is also the founder of the program Angklung Goes To School, implemented in schools around the Washington DC Metro Area, including the states of Maryland and Virginia. The program is listed in the Culture and Performance Arts Catalogue of Montgomery County Public Schools.

Tricia completed her master's degree in Organizational Science from George Washington University in 2010 and graduated as a Master of Management UI and Public Relations FISIP UI. She obtained her first Communications degree from FISIP UI in 1990, and is currently a board member of University of Indonesia Alumni Association (ILUNI) - USA Chapter.
