= Abdul Karim Oei =

Indonesian politician (1905–1988)

Oei Tjeng Hien

Member of the House of Representatives
- In office March 1956 – June 1960
- President: Sukarno
- Parliamentary group: Masyumi

Personal details
- Born: June 6, 1905 Padang Panjang, West Sumatra, Dutch East Indies
- Died: October 13, 1988 (aged 83) Jakarta, Indonesia
- Resting place: Tanah Kusir Cemetery, Jakarta
- Party: Masyumi
- Spouse: Maemunah Mukhtar
- Occupation: Politician, Businessman

Abdul Karim Oei or Oei Tjeng Hien (June 6, 1905 – October 13, 1988) was a Chinese Indonesian Muslim and leader in the Chinese and Muslim communities. He founded the Indonesian Chinese Muslim Association (Persatuan Islam Tionghoa Indonesia, abbreviated PITI). In the political sphere, Oei was a member of the Indonesian House of Representatives (1956-1959), where he represented the Chinese community, and the chair of the Masyumi Party in Bengkulu.

== Early life and conversion ==
Abdul Karim Oei was born on June 6, 1905 in Padang Panjang, West Sumatra. He was named Oei Tjeng Hien. At the age of one, he was sent given to foster parents, but after his foster father died, he was returned to his parents. He attended a Dutch primary school, but after graduating did not continue his studies. He eventually went into business.

At first, Oei explored Buddhism and Confucianism, then converted to Adventist Christianity, before finally converting to Islam in 1931.

== Religious and political activities ==
Abdul Karim Oei founded a branch of Muhammadiyah in Bintuhan, Bengkulu. He was eventually asked to be the head of Muhammadiyah in Bengkulu. He served as chairman of the board of Muhammadiyah in Bengkulu from 1939 to 1952.

After the Japanese Occupation, Oei became the party chief of Masyumi in Bengkulu. There, he and other Masyumi members engaged in guerilla activities against the Dutch.

In 1952, Oei moved to Jakarta, where he held positions within Muhammadiyah and Masyumi. He served as a parliamentary representative in the Indonesian House of Representatives for the Chinese minority from 1956 to 1959 and for Masyumi from 1959 to 1960.

From 1967 to 1974, he a leader in the Istiqlal Mosque in Jakarta. He was also an advisor to the Committee on the Understanding of National Unity (Indonesian: Badan Komunikasi Penghayatan Kesatuan Bangsa, abbreviated Bakom PKB) and an executive member of the Indonesian Ulama Council.

After Masyumi was disbanded, Oei founded the Indonesian Chinese Muslim Association (PITI) and served as its chairman until 1973.

== Legacy ==
The Haji Karim Oei Foundation was established in Oei's honor, in part to ease racial tensions in the Indonesian Muslim community. The foundation established and manages Lautze Mosque, located in the Chinatown area of Jakarta.

Oei was posthumously awarded the Utama class of the Star of Mahaputera on August 9, 2005.

== See also ==
- Karim, Abdul (1982). Mengabdi agama, nusa dan bangsa, sahabat karib Bung Karno. Jakarta: Gunung Agung.
