= Walsh-McLean House =

Mansion in Washington, D.C., which serves as the Embassy of Indonesia

Coordinates: 38°54′36.9″N 77°2′46.5″W

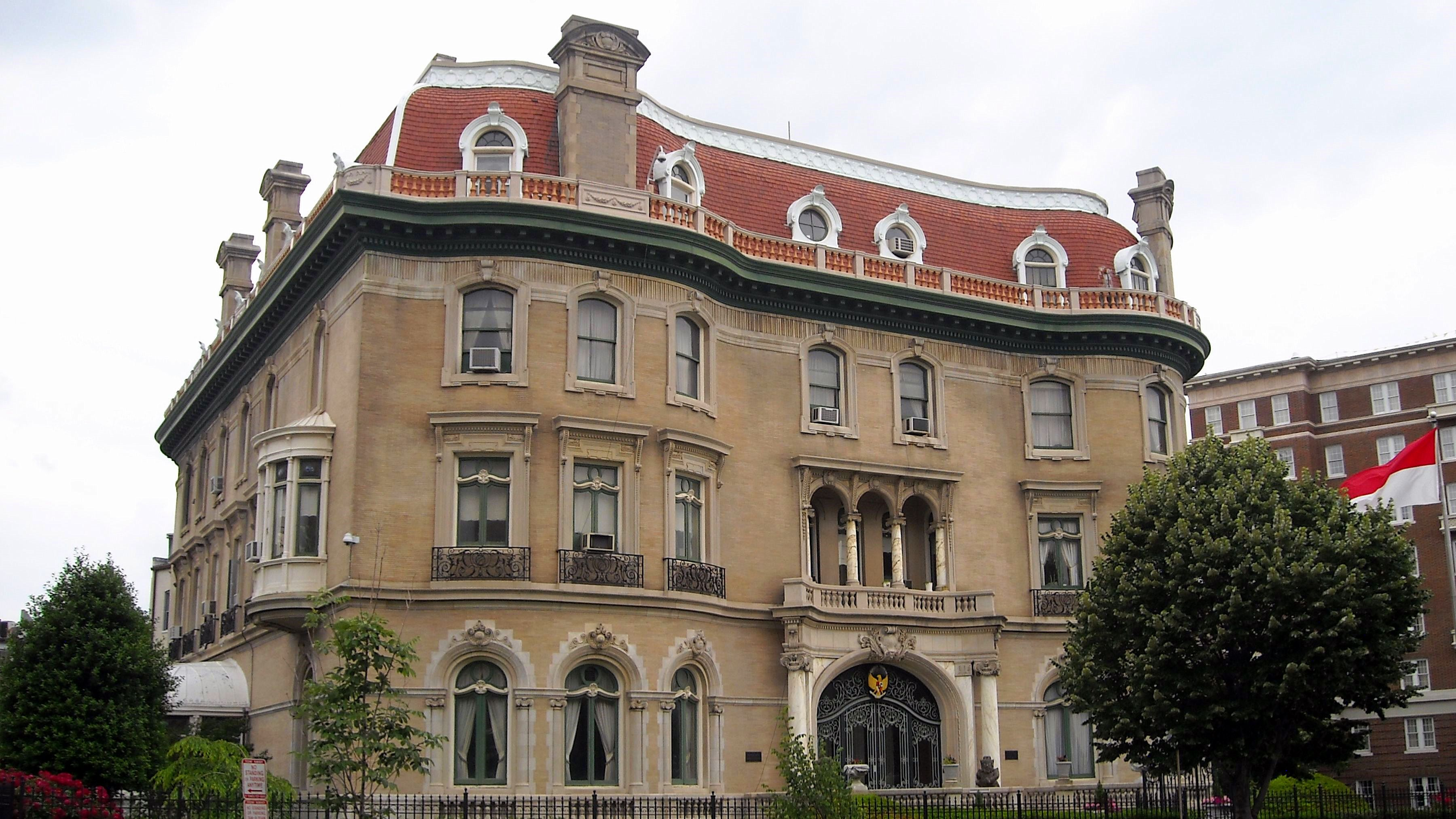
The former Walsh Mansion (now the Indonesian Embassy) near Dupont Circle

Walsh-McLean House is a Gilded Age mansion in the Dupont Circle neighborhood of Washington, D.C., located at 2020 Massachusetts Avenue NW. Built in 1901, it is now the Embassy of Indonesia.

== History ==
Thomas F. Walsh had emigrated penniless from Ireland to the United States in 1869, then over the next quarter century built up a small fortune as a carpenter, miner, and hotel manager. His first daughter (born in 1880) died in infancy, but his daughter, Evalyn (born in 1886), and son, Vinson (born in 1888), both survived. He lost nearly all his life's savings in the Panic of 1893.

The family moved to Ouray, Colorado, in 1896, where Walsh bought the Camp Bird Mine (which was thought to have been worked out) and struck a massive vein of gold and silver. Now a multi-millionaire, Thomas Walsh moved his family to Washington, D.C., in 1898. After spending 1899–1900 in Paris, France, the Walshes returned to Washington where Thomas Walsh commenced the construction of a mansion on Massachusetts Avenue NW.

External videos
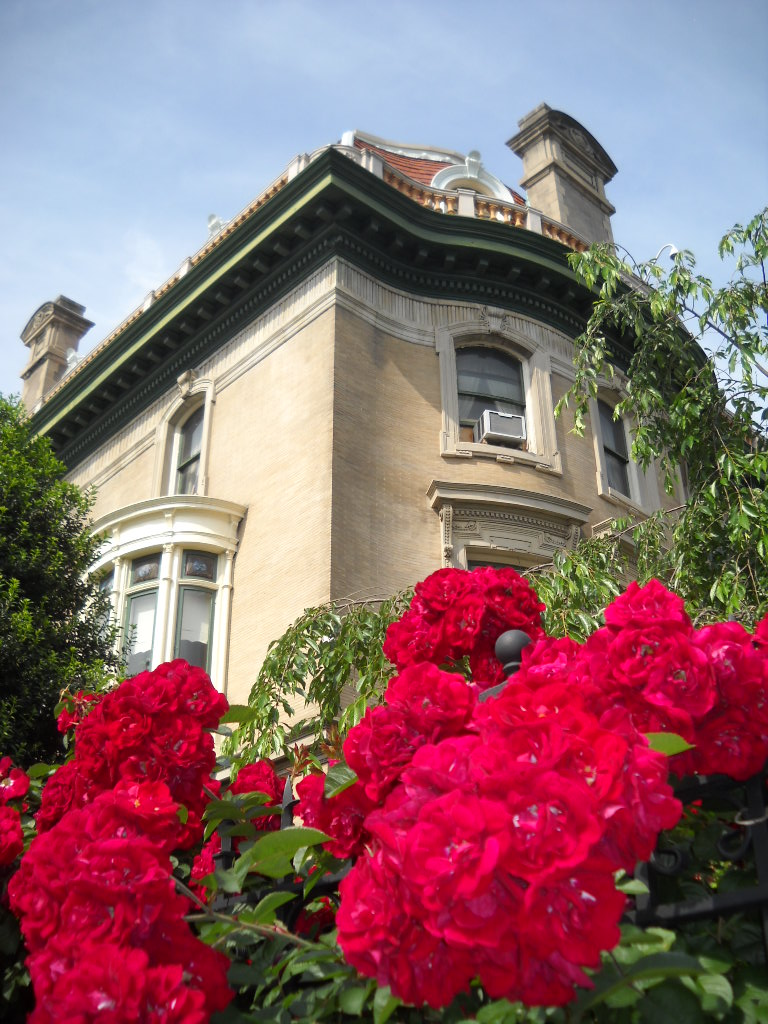
- Embassy of Indonesia Tour - Washington, DC, Wanda Kaluza

The Walsh-McLean House, completed in 1903, cost $835,000 (the most expensive residence in the city at the time) and had 60 rooms, a theater, a ballroom, a French salon, a grand staircase, and $2 million in furnishings which took several years to purchase and install. Walsh's daughter Evalyn Walsh married Edward Beale "Ned" McLean (the publishing heir whose family owned The Washington Post) in 1908, and after her father's death in April 1910 lived in the Walsh Mansion. In 1910, Ned McLean bought the allegedly cursed Hope Diamond for his wife for $180,000 (although the purchase was not formalized until February 1911, and not completed until after a lawsuit settled out of court in 1912). Evalyn Walsh died on April 26, 1947. To cover Evalyn's significant debts, the Walsh Mansion was sold in 1952 to the Government of Indonesia for use as an embassy.
