= Cheng Ho Mosque (Surabaya) =

Mosque in Surabaya, East Java, Indonesia

- Masjid Cheng Ho
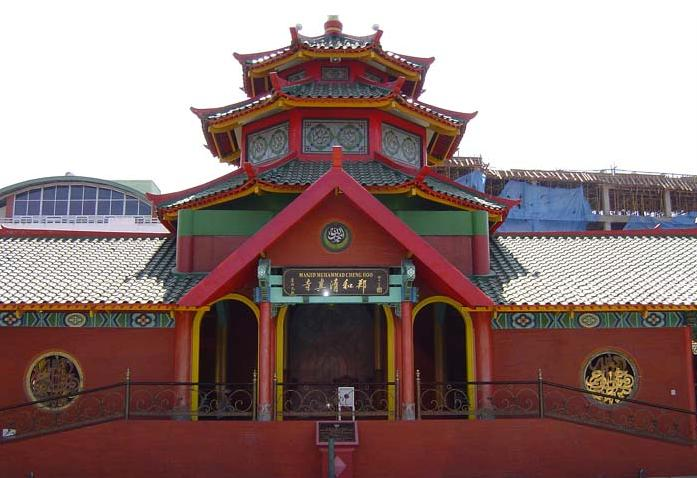

Religion
- Affiliation: Islam

Location
- Municipality: Surabaya
- State: East Java
- Country: Indonesia
- Interactive map of Cheng Ho Mosque
- Coordinates: 7°15′7″S 112°44′48″E

Architecture
- Architect: Abdul Aziz
- Type: mosque
- Style: Chinese
- Founder: Indonesian Chinese Islamic Association, Haji Muhammad Cheng Ho Foundation of East Java, Chinese community in Surabaya
- Established: 13 October 2002
- Groundbreaking: 15 October 2001
- Completed: 10 March 2002
- Capacity: 200 worshipers

Cheng Ho Mosque (Indonesian: Masjid Cheng Ho; also known as the Muhammad Cheng Ho Mosque, sometimes written as Cheng Hoo) is a mosque with Chinese influences in Ketabang, Kecamatan Genteng, Surabaya. It is located in the Indonesian Chinese Muslim Association (Persatuan Islam Tionghoa Indonesia, abbreviated PITI) complex, 1000 meters to the north of the Surabaya City Hall. The Surabaya Tourism Board has promoted it as a site for religious tourism.

== History ==
Leaders and members of the Indonesian Chinese Muslim Association (Persaudaraan Islam Tionghoa Indonesia) and the Haji Muhammad Cheng Ho Foundation of East Java, as well as members of the Chinese community in Surabaya, were responsible for the creation of the Cheng Ho Mosque. Construction of the mosque began on October 15, 2001, coinciding with Isra' and Mi'raj. Construction finished on March 10, 2002 and the building was inaugurated on October 13, 2002.

This mosque was named in honor of Zheng He (Cheng Ho, Sam Poo Kong, or Pompu Awang), a Chinese explorer and military member and a Muslim. He is known for having spread Islam during his travels in Southeast Asia. The mosque was built in a Chinese style to commemorate Cheng Ho's work spreading Islam.

There are at least ten other Cheng Ho mosques in Indonesia, including a Cheng Ho Mosque in Palembang and another in Banyuwangi.

== Architecture ==
Cheng Ho Mosque's architecture includes a blend of Chinese, Arab, and Javanese influences. It was designed by the architect Ir. Abdul Aziz from Bojonegoro.

The mosque was inspired in part by the Niujie Mosque in Beijing. This inspiration is evident in the peak of the mosque. Other aspects of the building's architecture show Middle Eastern and Javanese influences. For example, its entry door resembles a pagoda, with lion dragon reliefs, while the word "Allah" in Arabic is inscribed at the top of the pagoda. To the left of the building is a bedug.

The mosque is predominately red, green, and yellow, with Chinese-influenced ornamentation. The green represents Islamic traditions while red represents Chinese culture.

The mosque can accommodate about 200 worshipers. It was built on land measuring 21 by 11 square meters, with the main hall measuring 11 by 9 square meters. The mosque's roof is eight sided. Each of these measurements has a meaning: 11 is the measurement of the Kaaba when it was built, 9 represents the Wali Sanga, and 8 represents good fortune in Chinese culture.
