= Embassy of the United States, Jakarta =

Embassy in Jakarta, Indonesia

Embassy of the United States, Jakarta Kedutaan Besar Amerika Serikat, Jakarta
- Location: Jalan Medan Merdeka Selatan No. 3–5; Central Jakarta
- Ambassador: Peter Haymond
- Website: id.usembassy.gov

The Embassy of the United States to the Republic of Indonesia is located in Jakarta at Jalan Medan Merdeka Selatan, just south of the National Monument or Merdeka Square and the Merdeka Palace, official residence of the Indonesian president.

== History ==
=== Original building ===
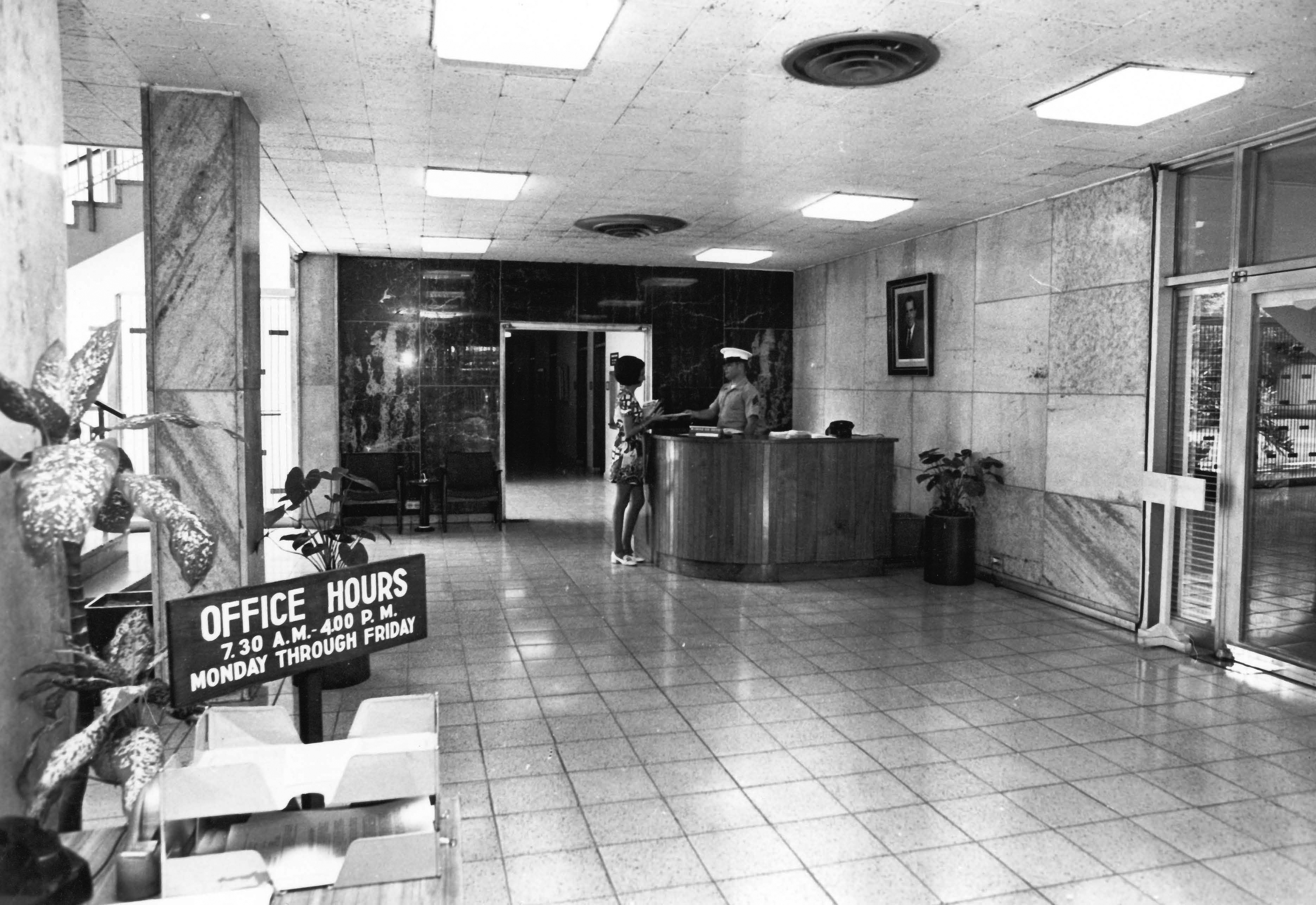
Marine guard post at the U.S. Embassy Jakarta, 1970.

The original building was designed by Czech architect Antonin Raymond and Ladislav Rado. They began work on the design in 1953. The preliminary design for the embassy was criticized by Sukarno, first president of Indonesia. He felt that the small two-story design they produced suggested that the post was unimportant to the United States. He wished to have a larger and more prominent building constructed. Sukarno, however, ultimately accepted the design after small alterations were made, in part due to pressure directed at him by the U.S. State Department.

=== New building ===
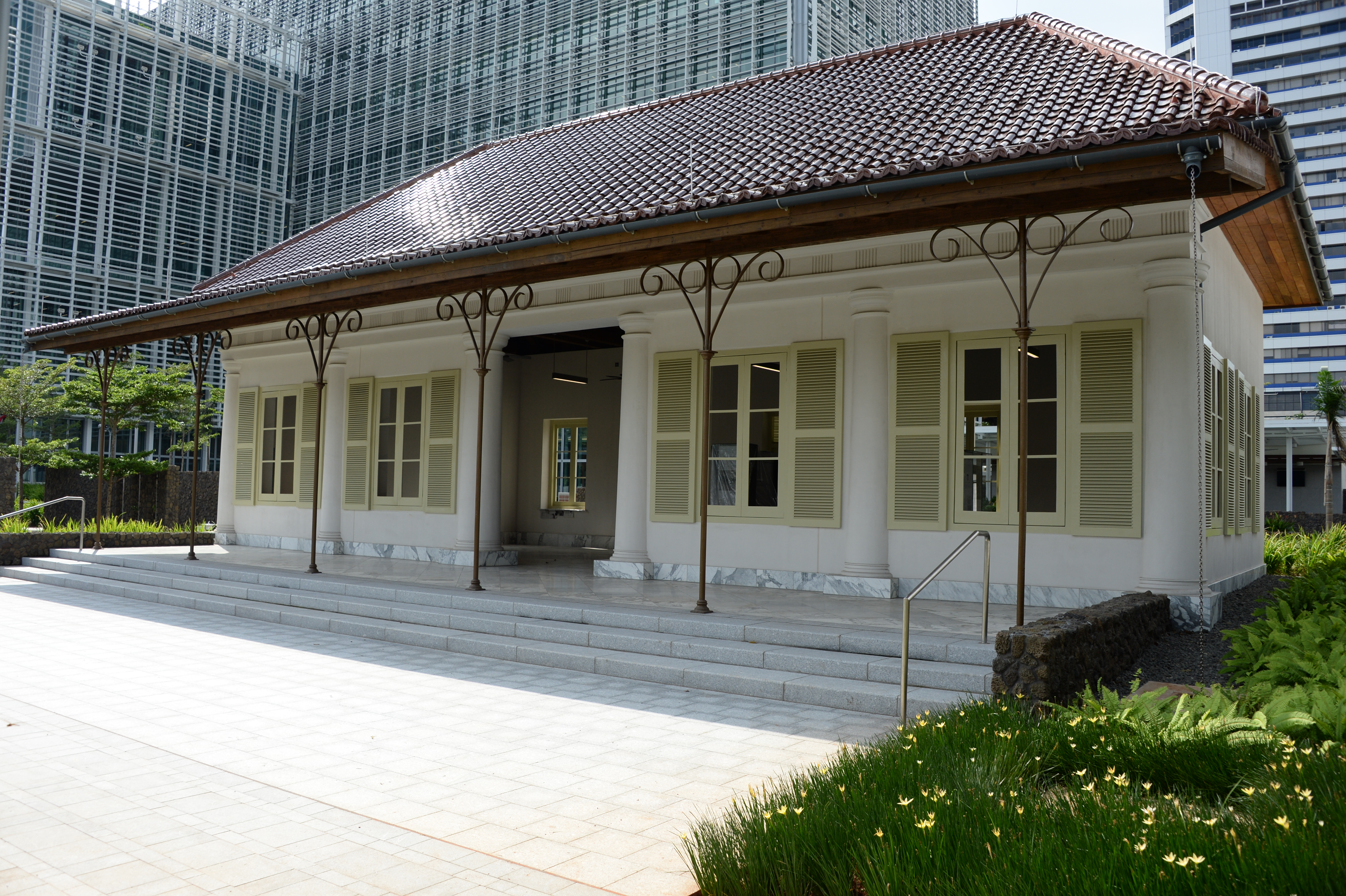
Heritage building inside the embassy. Main embassy building can be seen in the background.

The US Ambassador to Indonesia, Scot Marciel, announced the construction of a new embassy in July 2012. The new embassy will include a 10-story chancery building, parking garage, building extension, utility building, consular waiting area, three entrance facilities and restoration of a historic building which the Indonesian delegation occupied during negotiations with the Dutch in 1949. The Bureau of Overseas Buildings Operations announced the award of a $302 million design or build contract to B.L. Harbert International of Birmingham, Alabama in November 2012, and named Davis Brody Bond Architects and Planners of New York, New York as the concept design architect and Page as the architect of record.

Protests against the foreign policy of the United States have been held at the embassy in response to U.S. policy on West Papua, communism, and the War in Afghanistan.

Between 2002 and 2023, the sidewalk directly in front of the embassy had been restricted for pedestrian access with barbed wire, due to security reasons. Public access was reestablished in June 2023 following public complaints.

== See also ==
- United States Ambassador to Indonesia
- Consulate General of the United States, Surabaya
- Indonesia–United States relations
- List of diplomatic missions of the United States

== Bibliography ==
- Loeffler, Jane C. (1998), The Architecture of Diplomacy: Building America's Embassies, Princeton Architectural Press, ISBN 978-1-56898-138-3
