= Cheng Ho Mosque (Banyuwangi) =

Mosque in Banyuwangi, East Java, Indonesia

Muhammad Cheng Ho Mosque Banyuwangi
- Masjid Muhammad Cheng Ho Banyuwangi ꦩꦯ꧀ꦗꦶꦢ꧀ꦩꦸꦲꦩ꧀ꦩꦢ꧀ꦕ꧀ꦲꦼꦁ꧀ꦲꦴꦨꦘꦸꦮꦔꦶ 穆罕默德郑和外南梦清真寺 مسجد محمد تشنغ خه بانيووانجى

Religion
- Affiliation: Islam

Location
- Location: Banyuwangi Regency, East Java, Indonesia
- Interactive map of Muhammad Cheng Ho Mosque Banyuwangi
- Coordinates: 8°14′18″S 114°20′44″E

Architecture
- Type: Mosque
- Style: Chinese and Arab architectural elements

Muhammad Cheng Ho Mosque Banyuwangi (Indonesian: Masjid Muhammad Cheng Ho Banyuwangi) is a mosque located in Banyuwangi Regency, East Java, Indonesia. The mosque incorporates architectural elements associated with Chinese and Islamic traditions and is part of a network of Cheng Ho mosques established in several cities in Indonesia.

== History ==
The mosque was established through an initiative by members of the Chinese-Indonesian Muslim community associated with the Indonesian Chinese Muslim Association (Persatuan Islam Tionghoa Indonesia – PITI), with funding from local residents, Chinese-Indonesian communities, and the organization's regional branch in East Java.

It was inaugurated on 26 November 2016 by Coordinating Minister for Political, Legal, and Security Affairs Wiranto. The inauguration was attended by the Consul General of China in Surabaya, representatives of Nahdlatul Ulama in East Java, local military officials, and members of the community.

The name of the mosque refers to Muhammad Cheng Ho, a Chinese admiral associated with voyages across Southeast Asia in the early 15th century. Historical accounts cited in these sources associate Cheng Ho with maritime expeditions between 1405 and 1433, including visits to parts of the Indonesian archipelago.

== Architecture ==
The mosque features a multi-tiered roof with five levels that become progressively smaller toward the top, reflecting forms associated with pagoda-style structures.

The entrance gate and surrounding fence incorporate design elements associated with Chinese temple architecture, with a colour scheme dominated by red, yellow, and green. The overall design combines these features with elements commonly associated with mosque architecture.

The main mosque building measures approximately 28 × 26 metres, while the surrounding complex, including an Islamic boarding school, covers an area of about 2 hectares.

== Function ==
Muhammad Cheng Ho Mosque Banyuwangi functions as a place of worship for Muslims in the area and is also integrated with the pesantren (Islamic boarding school) Adz-Dzikra Muhammad Cheng Ho.

The complex is used for religious education, community activities, and daily prayers. The pesantren associated with the mosque is identified in the sources as one of the early Cheng Ho-affiliated Islamic boarding schools established in Indonesia.
