= Indonesian Chinese Muslim Association =

- Persatuan Islam Tionghoa Indonesia
- Abbreviation: PITI
- Formation: April 14, 1961; 65 years ago
- Founder: Abdul Karim Oei
- Type: Religious organization
- Headquarters: Jakarta, Indonesia
- Members: Chinese Muslims
- Official language: Indonesian

The Indonesian Chinese Muslim Association (Indonesian: Persatuan Islam Tionghoa Indonesia, abbreviated PITI) is an Indonesian Islamic organization with a focus on Chinese ethnicity and on the integration of Islam, Chinese culture, and Indonesian identity. PITI serves as a space for community, dawah, and socioeconomic development while upholding values of moderate Islam, inclusivity, and tolerance.

== History ==
PITI is an Islamic community organization focused on Chinese Muslims in Indonesia. The organization is active in the fields of dawah, Islamic education, the development of converts, and other social activities, with the goal of strengthening the role of Chinese Muslims in the life of the nation.

PITI was established in Jakarta on April 14, 1961 by Abdul Karim Oei Tjeng Hien, Abdusomad Yap A Siong, Kho Goan Tjin, and Ahmad Tanoesoedibjo. PITI was the result of the merger of two other organizations: the Islamic Ethnic Chinese Association (Persaudaraan Islam Tionghoa, abbreviated PIT) led by Abdusomad Yap A Siong and the Muslim Ethnic Chinese Association (Persaudaraan Muslim Tionghoa, abbreviated PMT) led by Kho Goan Tjin. Before this merger, PIT and PMT were active in areas in Sumatra, including North Sumatra, West Sumatra, Riau, the Riau Islands, Jambi, Bengkulu, South Sumatra, and Lampung. At the time, the two organizations' activities were localized and were not widely known among both Chinese Muslims and Indonesian Muslims broadly. To strengthen brotherhood among Chinese Muslims, PIT and PMT centralized their activities in Jakarta and became one organization: PITI.

During the era of Guided Democracy in Indonesia, PITI actively proselytized to the Chinese community through a cultural approach. During the New Order, government policies of assimilation impacted organizations based on identity; the use of terms and symbols related to Chinese identity was prohibited. Because of this, on December 15, 1972, PITI's name was changed to Pembina Iman Tauhid Islam (English: Supervisory Board for Islamic Faith and Theology). This name, which did not relate to Chinese identity, ensured that the organization complied with government policies and was able to continue its preaching and community development activities. Despite the restrictions, PITI continued to organize religious and social activities, including religious study groups, education sessions for converts, and community activities in several different geographic areas.

After 1998, there was more room for freedom of expression and organization. In May 2000, PITI's leadership changed its name to Persaudaraan Islam Tionghoa Indonesia. This period coincided with increased attention to and protection of the rights of Chinese Indonesians, especially during the presidency of Abdurrahman Wahid.

== Activities ==
PITI's programming focuses on Islamic education, especially for those of Chinese descent. This includes providing guidance to Chinese Muslims on implementing Islamic teachings amongst their non-Muslim family members and on interacting with Muslims in their residential or work environments, as well as offering protection and support to those who face problems from their family or community after having converted to Islam.

PITI focuses both on Chinese Muslims who have recently converted as well as building community for long-time followers of the religion.

== Mosques ==
PITI was responsible for establishing the Cheng Ho Mosque in Surabaya. This has led to the construction of several other mosques with Chinese architecture, including Ja'mi An Naba KH Tan Shin Bie Mosque in Purwokerto, mosques named after Cheng Ho in Palembang and Semarang, the Central Java Cheng Ho Mosque, and the Islamic Center in Kudus.
