= Cheng Ho Mosque (Batam) =

Mosque in Batam, Riau Islands, Indonesia

Coordinates: 1°08′47″N 104°01′38″E

Muhammad Cheng Ho Mosque (Indonesian: Masjid Muhammad Cheng Ho), also known as Cheng Ho Mosque Batam (Masjid Laksamana Cheng Ho Batam), is a mosque located in the Golden City area of Bengkong, Batam, Riau Islands, Indonesia. The mosque features architectural elements associated with Chinese and Islamic styles and is visited by local residents and tourists.

The mosque was built in 2015 and was named in honor of Cheng Ho (Zheng He), a Chinese admiral associated with voyages to the Indonesian archipelago in the 15th century. The mosque also functions as a venue for religious and community activities.

== History ==
Masjid Muhammad Cheng Ho was established in 2015 in Bengkong, Batam. The construction was initiated and funded by a businessman in Batam.

The mosque was inaugurated on 21 February 2015 by Coordinating Minister for Maritime Affairs Indroyono Soesilo and Minister of Tourism Arief Yahya.

The name refers to Cheng Ho, a Chinese admiral known for his expeditions to Southeast Asia, including visits to Aceh, Palembang, and parts of Java.

== Architecture ==
The building incorporates elements associated with Chinese architecture alongside features typical of mosques. The exterior uses red as a dominant colour and includes ornamentation associated with Chinese design.

The structure does not use a conventional dome and includes Arabic calligraphy combined with decorative elements. The building stands on a plot measuring approximately 80 × 80 metres, with a main structure of about 20 × 30 metres and a capacity of around 200 worshippers.

== Function ==
The mosque is used for daily prayers and other religious activities by local residents. It is also visited as a religious tourism site by visitors from Batam and other regions, including neighbouring countries.

Activities at the mosque include religious gatherings and community events.
