= Embassy of Indonesia, Washington, D.C. =

Diplomatic embassy

Embassy of the Republic of Indonesia in Washington, D.C. Kedutaan Besar Republik Indonesia di Washington D.C.

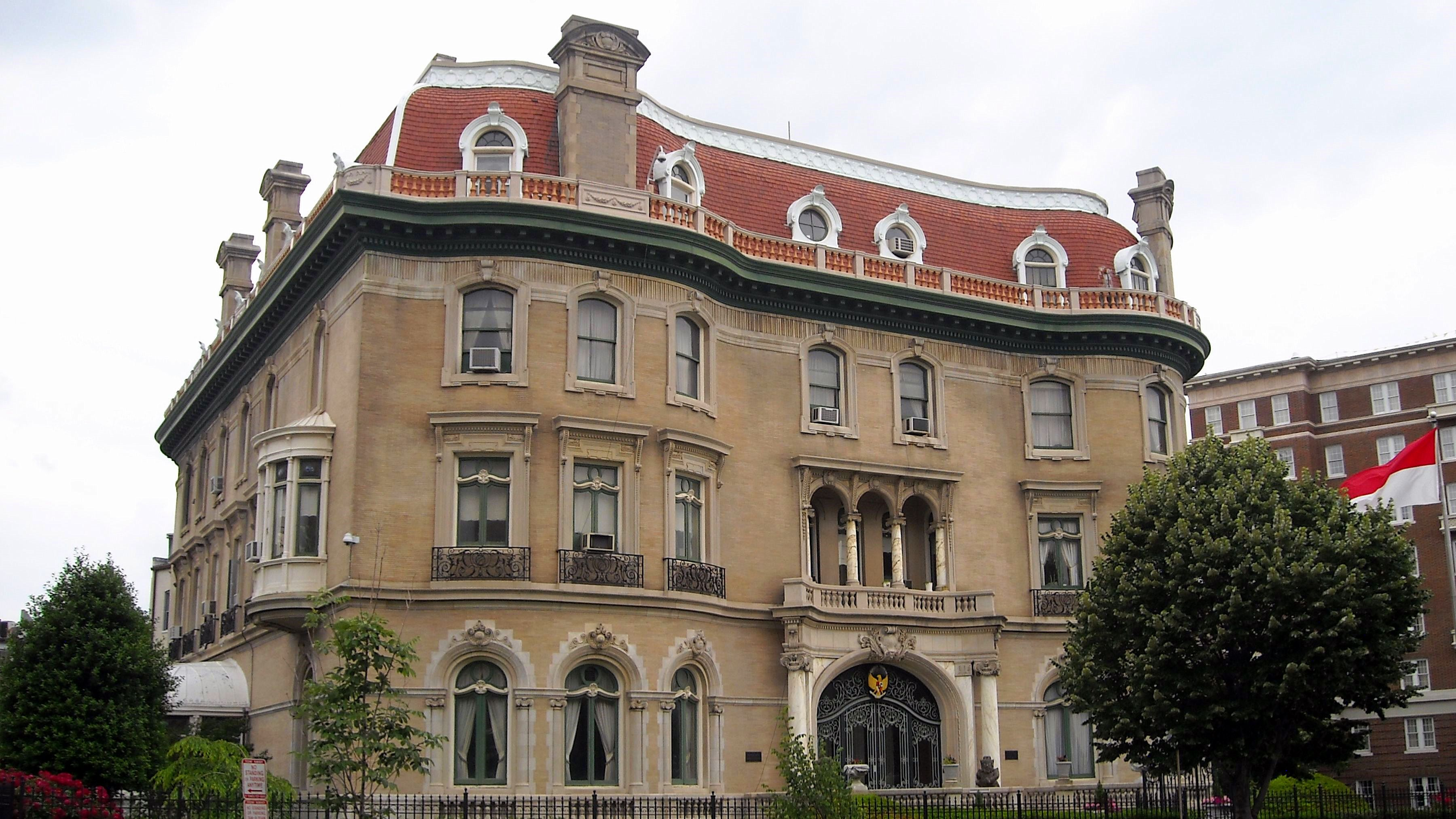
- Location: Washington, D.C., U.S.
- Address: 2020 Massachusetts Avenue, N.W.
- Ambassador: Indroyono Soesilo
- Website: www.kemlu.go.id/washington/en/
- Indonesian Embassy
- U.S. National Register of Historic Places
- Location within Washington, D.C.
- Coordinates: 38°54′37″N 77°02′47″W
- Area: 0.3 acres (0.12 ha)
- Built: 1903
- Architect: Henry Anderson
- Architectural style: Late 19th And 20th Century Revivals, Baroque Revival
- NRHP reference No.: 73002091
- Added to NRHP: 18 January 1973

The Embassy of the Republic of Indonesia in Washington, D.C. (Indonesian: Kedutaan Besar Republik Indonesia di Washington, D.C.) is the diplomatic mission of the Republic of Indonesia to the United States. It is located at 2020 Massachusetts Avenue, Northwest, Washington, D.C., in the Embassy Row neighborhood. It is accessed by the Dupont Circle station of the Washington Metro.

Indonesia has five consulate generals in Chicago, Houston, Los Angeles, New York City, and San Francisco, and an honorary consulate in Honolulu. There is also a permanent mission to the United Nations in New York.

The current ambassador, Indroyono Soesilo, was appointed by Prabowo Subianto on 25 August 2025.

== Building ==
The building is also known as the Walsh-McLean House and is listed on the National Register of Historic Places. It is a part of the Massachusetts Avenue Historic District, as well as the Dupont Circle Historic District.

The 50-room mansion, designed by architect Henry Andersen, was built from 1901 to 1903 by Irish-born Thomas F. Walsh for his daughter Evalyn. It cost $853,000 to construct (about $20 million in 2008). Evalyn eventually married Edward McLean, whose family owned The Washington Post. Edward negotiated to buy his wife the Hope Diamond, in a dressing room of the house. She was the last private owner of the famous jewel.

In 1936, the mansion was used by the U.S. Suburban Resettlement Administration, and in 1937 by the U.S. Rural Electrification Commission. From 1941 to 1951 the American Red Cross manufactured surgical dressings, and held classes for nurse's aides in the building. On 19 December 1951, Ali Sastroamidjojo purchased the building for $335,000, for Indonesia.

In September 2014, the Indonesian government inaugurated a 16-foot tall statue of Dewi Saraswati, a goddess of knowledge and wisdom, representative of the island of Bali. This statue is one of a few statues on Embassy Row, the others being a statue of Winston Churchill at the British Embassy, and a statue of Mahatma Gandhi at the Indian Embassy.

== See also ==
- Indonesia–United States relations
- Consulate-General of Indonesia, Houston
- List of diplomatic missions of Indonesia
