= Cheng Ho Mosque (Pasuruan) =

Mosque in Pasuruan, East Java, Indonesia

Cheng Ho Mosque Pandaan
- Masjid Muhammad Cheng Ho Pandaan
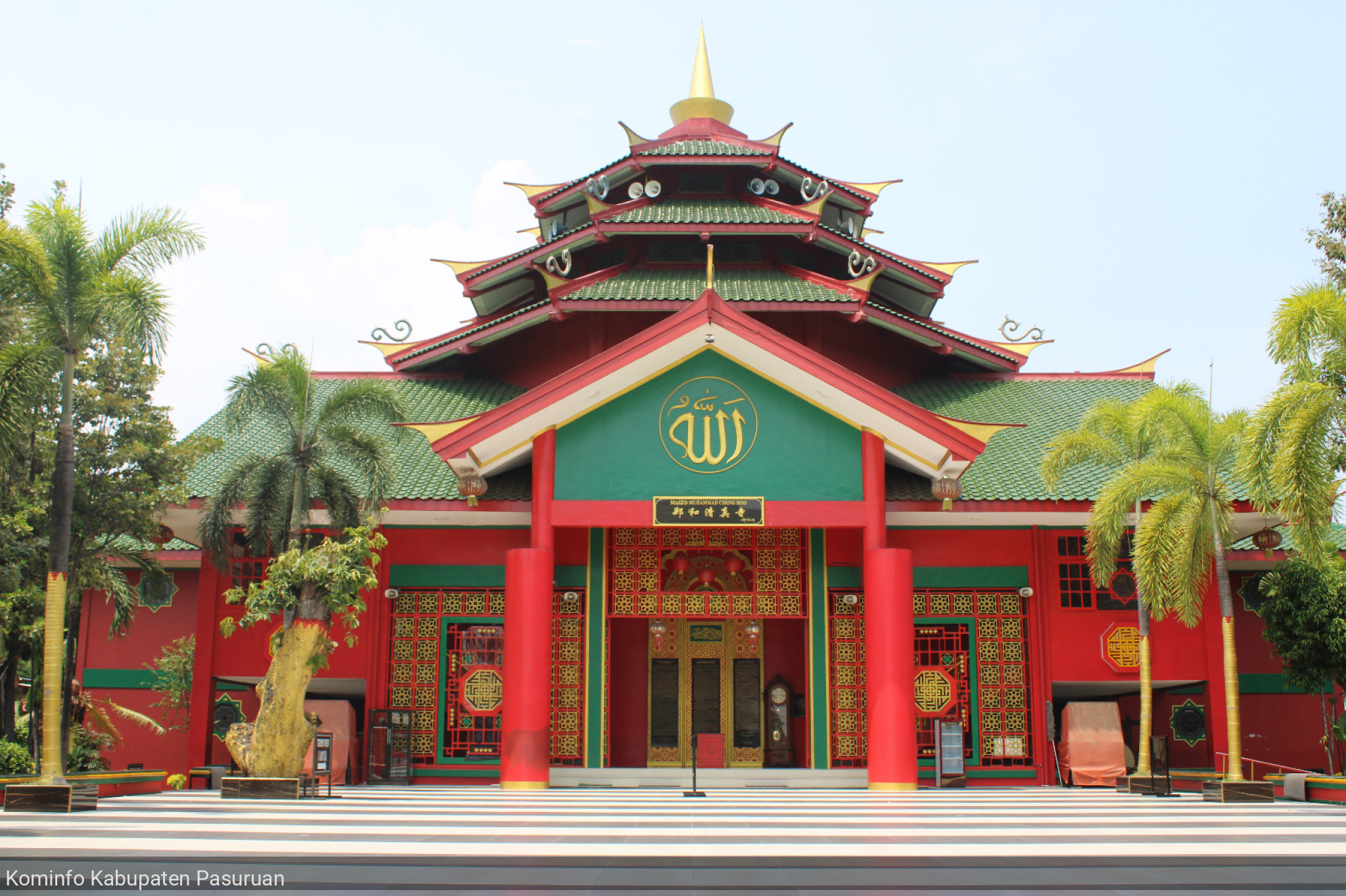

Religion
- Affiliation: Islam
- Branch/tradition: Sunni
- Status: Active

Location
- Location: Pandaan, Pasuruan Regency, East Java, Indonesia
- Interactive map of Cheng Ho Mosque Pandaan
- Coordinates: 7°39′6.347″S 112°41′15.799″E

Architecture
- Type: Mosque
- Style: Chinese, Javanese, and Islamic
- Groundbreaking: 30 May 2004
- Completed: 27 January 2008

Muhammad Cheng Ho Mosque Pandaan (Indonesian: Masjid Muhammad Cheng Ho Pandaan) is a mosque located in Pandaan, Pasuruan Regency, East Java, Indonesia. The mosque is known for its design that combines Chinese, Javanese, and Islamic architectural elements.

== History ==
The mosque was planned in 2004 and completed in 2008. The first stone was laid on 30 May 2004 by Abdurrahman Wahid. The mosque was later inaugurated on 27 January 2008 by the Regent of Pasuruan at that time.

The construction was initiated by the local government of Pasuruan under Regent Jusbakir Al-Jufri after a visit to China. The project used government funding and community support.

This mosque was named in honor of Cheng Ho (Zheng He), a Chinese admiral and a Muslim. He is known for having spread Islam during his travels in Southeast Asia. The mosque was built in a Chinese style to commemorate Cheng Ho's work spreading Islam.

== Architecture ==
The mosque uses a combination of Chinese, Javanese, and Islamic design elements. The building has a layered roof that resembles a pagoda.

Inside the mosque, there are several symbolic elements. These include multiple pillars, layered roof levels, and decorative patterns influenced by Chinese and Islamic traditions. The structure also includes features typical of a mosque, such as a mihrab and a pulpit.

== Function ==
The mosque is used for daily prayers and religious activities. It is also used for community events, including gatherings, religious studies, and ceremonies.

The building has two floors. The upper floor is used for prayer, while the lower floor can be used for meetings and public activities.
