= Lautze Mosque =

Mosque in Sawah Besar, Jakarta, Indonesia

- Masjid Lautze
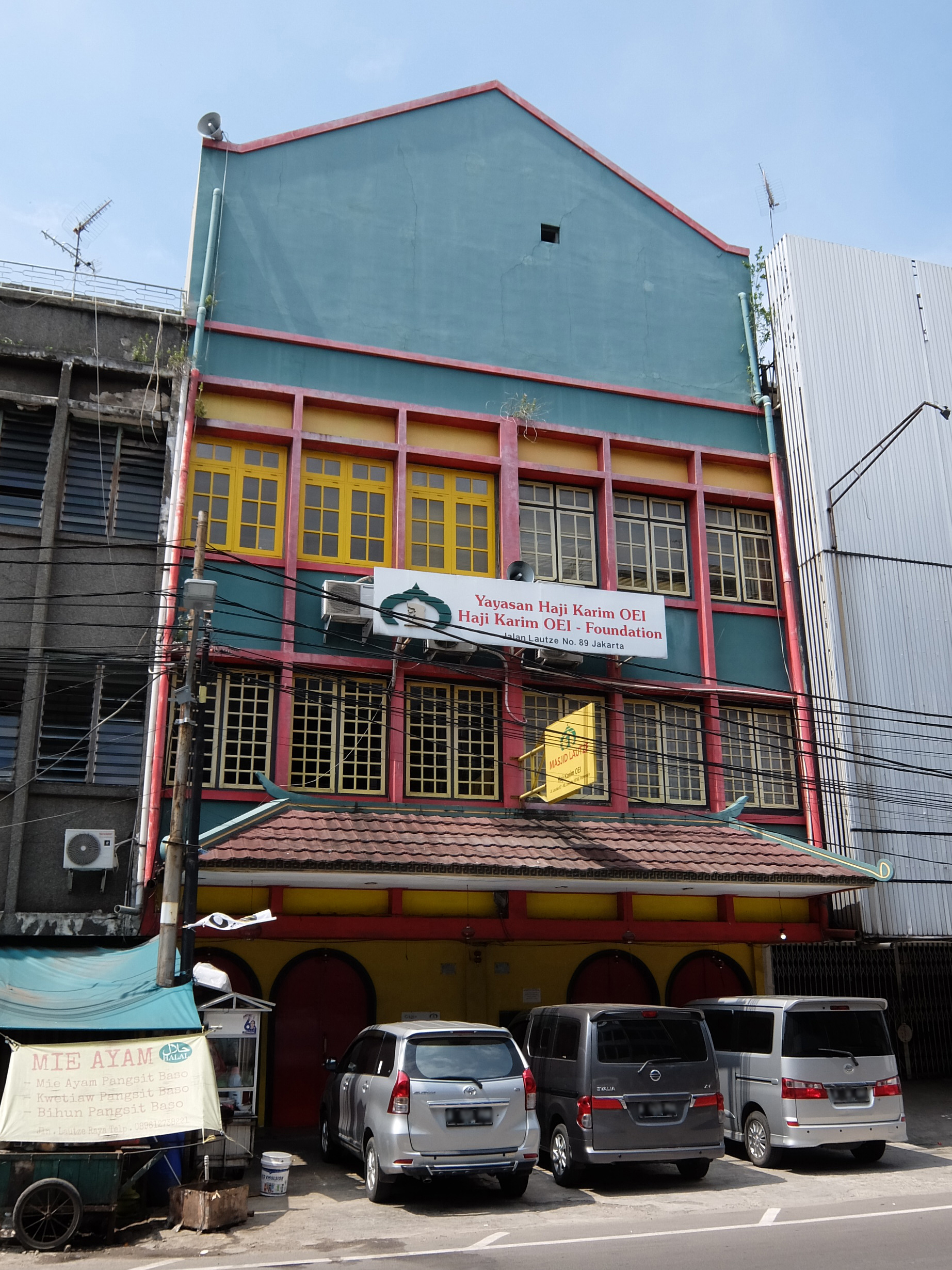

- Location within Jakarta

Religion
- Affiliation: Islam
- Branch/tradition: Sunni

Location
- Location: Sawah Besar, Jakarta, Indonesia
- Interactive map of Lautze Mosque
- Coordinates: 6°9′32.2″S 106°49′47.7″E

Architecture
- Type: mosque
- Style: Chinese
- Founder: Haji Abdul Karim Oei Foundation
- Established: 1991
- Capacity: 300 worshippers

The Lautze Mosque (Indonesian: Masjid Lautze) is a mosque in Sawah Besar, Jakarta, Indonesia.

== History ==
The mosque was established in 1991 by Haji Abdul Karim Oei Foundation by renting a shop lot and named after Abdul Karim Oei, a prominent nationalist and Chinese Indonesians. It was then later expanded to two shop lots adjacent to each other in 1994 after receiving a grant from dictator Suharto. It was then inaugurated by Research and Technology Minister B. J. Habibie in the same year. In 2018, the mosque nameplate was displayed outside the building.

The Mosque in Jakarta has become a haven for ethnic Chinese Indonesians embracing Islam and a focal point of community integration.

== Architecture ==
The mosque is housed in a two adjacent shop lot buildings with red, yellow and green exterior colors. It has a total of three floors and can accommodate up to 300 worshippers. The ground floor houses the main prayer hall, the upper floor houses the additional prayer hall and the wudu area and the top most floor houses the administration office. It was designed with Chinese architectural style.

== Transportation ==
The mosque is accessible within walking distance northeast of Sawah Besar Station of Kereta Api Indonesia.

== See also ==
- Islam in Indonesia
