= Indroyono Soesilo =

Indonesian politician

Dwisuryo Indroyono Soesilo
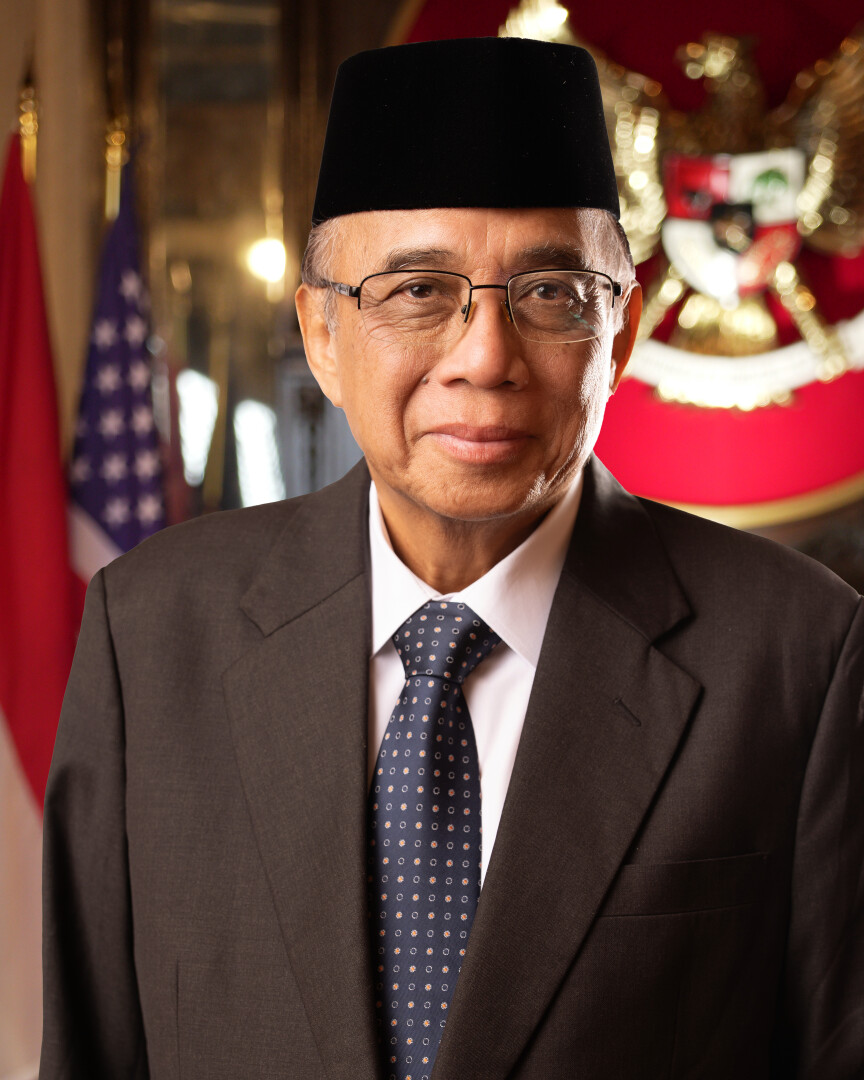
- Official portrait, 2025

22nd Ambassador of Indonesia to the United States
- Incumbent
- Assumed office 25 August 2025
- President: Prabowo Subianto
- Preceded by: Rosan Roeslani

Coordinating Minister of Maritime Affairs
- In office 27 October 2014 – 12 August 2015
- President: Joko Widodo
- Preceded by: Jatidjan Sastroredjo
- Succeeded by: Rizal Ramli

Personal details
- Born: 27 March 1955 (age 71) Bandung, Indonesia
- Party: Independent
- Spouse: Nining Sri Astuti
- Children: 3
- Education: Bandung Institute of Technology; University of Michigan; University of Iowa
- Occupation: Politician

Dwisuryo Indroyono Soesilo (born 27 March 1955 in Bandung, Indonesia) is an engineer, politician, and diplomat from Indonesia. He is currently Ambassador of Indonesia to the United States since August 2025. He was a Coordinating Minister of Maritime Affairs. in the Working Cabinet (2014–2019) from 27 October 2014 to 12 August 2015. On 12 August 2015, he was replaced by Rizal Ramli on first reshuffle of cabinet.

== Honours ==
National :

- Star of Mahaputera, 3rd Class (9 Agustus 2009)
- Star of Merit, 1st Class (13 Agustus 1999)
- Order of Civil Servant Dedication 10 Years (1999)
- Order of Development (1995)
