= Cheng Ho Mosque (Palembang) =

Mosque in Palembang, South Sumatra, Indonesia

Coordinates: 3.0244508°S 104.7778827°E

Cheng Ho Mosque Masjid Cheng Hoo Sriwijaya Palembang
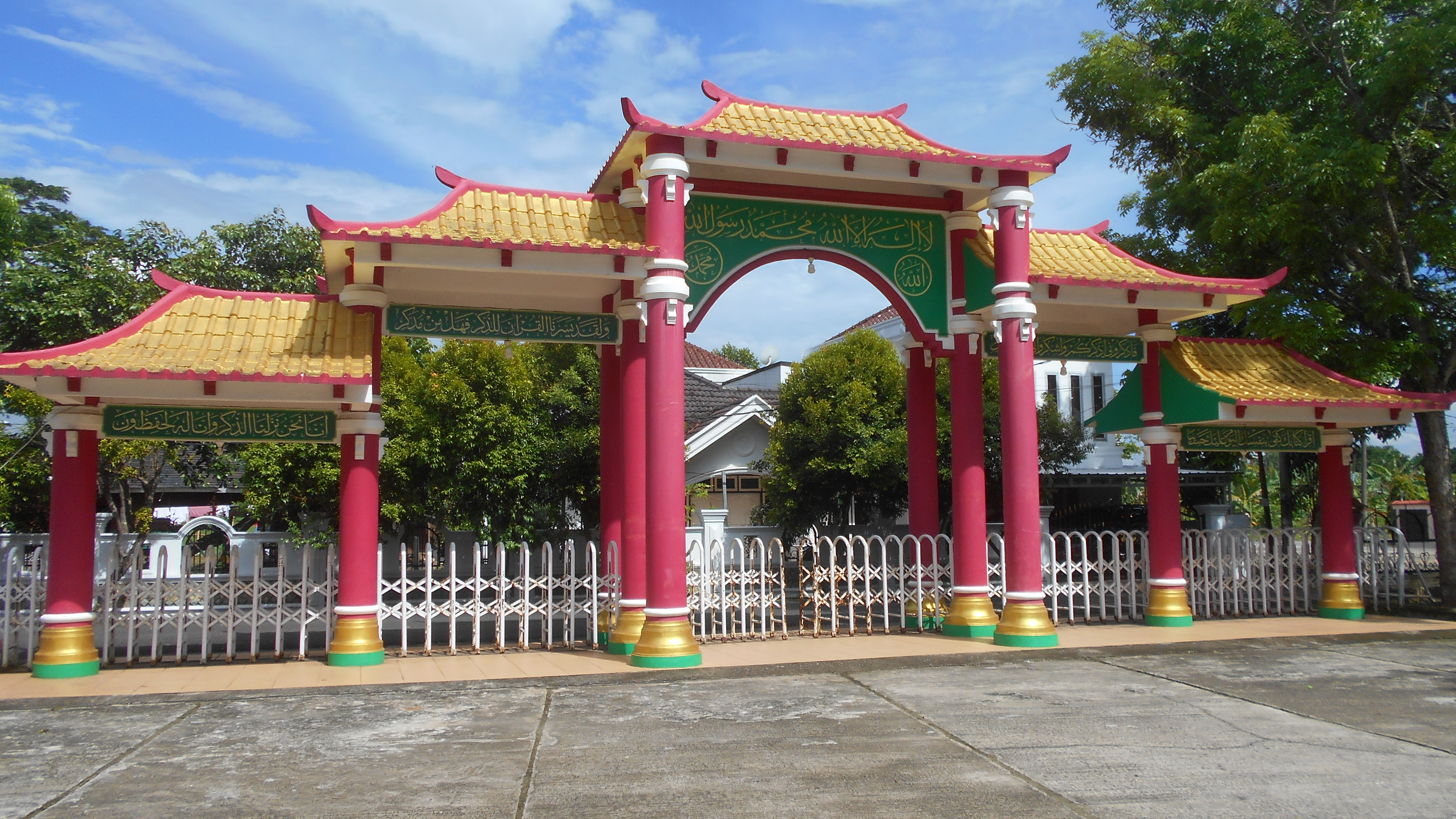
- Gateaway to the mosque

Religion
- Affiliation: Islam
- Branch/tradition: Sunni

Location
- Location: Palembang, South Sumatra, Indonesia
- Interactive map of Cheng Ho Mosque; Masjid Cheng Hoo Sriwijaya Palembang

Architecture
- Type: Mosque
- Style: Chinese
- Completed: 2006
- Construction cost: 150 million rupiah

Zheng He Mosque, officially the Islamic Mosque of Mohammed Zheng He in Srivijayan Palembang (Indonesian: Masjid Al-Islamiyyah Muhammad Cheng Ho Sriwijaya Palembang), is a mosque dedicated to Muslim Chinese people located in Jakabaring Palembang, South Sumatra, Indonesia. The name of the mosque is in honor of the acclaimed Muslim Chinese admiral, Zheng He. The mosque was founded by the initiative of the elders, advisers, and administrators of the Chinese Islamic Association of Indonesia (PITI) of South Sumatra, as well as Chinese community leaders around Palembang. Previously the mosque was led by renowned imam, Ustadz Choirul Rizal, who had memorized 30 juz' from the Quran. Ustadz Miftah who serves as an imam today, is also a hafiz.

The mosque was built with a combination of architectural elements from China, Malay, and Indonesian archipelago, complete with certain parts of the mosque such as imam's residence and surrounding fences. The mosque also serves as a place of free education of Islamic learning. Construction of the mosque begun with laying of the first stones in 2003, and ended with inauguration in 2006. The land was a grant from the local government, and the initial budget of the construction was around 150 million rupiah, gathered by the PITI community. Cheng Ho Mosque is considered a testament to cultural diversity and room for expressing those identities—Chinese and Islamic—in the context of Indonesian society.

== History ==
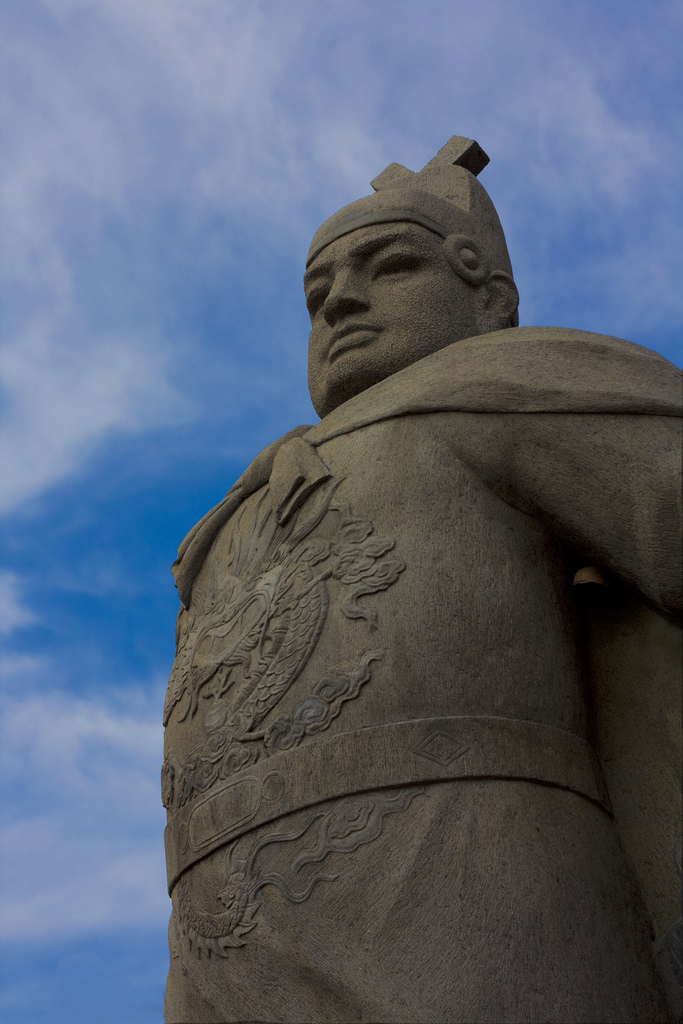
Admiral Zheng He (Cheng Hoo)

The city of Palembang, where the mosque exists, is not separated from the presence of Admiral Zheng He. During his voyage around the world, he had stopped by Palembang for four times.

Merchants from China, in addition to traders from Arab and surrounding areas, played a big role in the propagation of Islam in Indonesia, especially in the coastal area of Palembang. Admiral Zheng is considered related to this history between China and Indonesia. He led the fleet including ships as many as 62 and 27,800 soldiers, which sailed from the old port in Palembang. In 1407, the city of Palembang under the rule of Srivijaya, had requested the help to the Chinese fleet in Southeast Asia to purge the Hokkien Chinese pirates who disturbed the security. Answering to the request, Admiral Zheng's fleet captured the leader of the pirates Chen Tsu Ji and took him to Beijing. Since then, Admiral Zheng had formed the Muslim Chinese community in the city of Palembang which has existed since then, and it was inhabited by many Chinese people. During Zheng He's journey between 1405 and 1433, he had visited Palembang four times. The first time was in 1407, when his fleet came to Palembang in order to purge the pirates led by Chen Tsui Ji. The other visits were in 1413–1415, 1421–1422, and 1431–1433.

== Architecture ==
The mosque has two storeys and is able to accommodate around 600 worshipers. It has a unique architectural design, which combines elements of local Palembang culture with Chinese and Arabic architecture. The mosque was built on 5,000 square meters of land in a middle-class housing complex. The minarets on both sides of the mosque are inspired by the Chinese pagoda, and are painted in red and jade green.

== Function ==
The function of the mosque is more than a place of worship. The mosque hosts various religious and civic activities, and has become a tourist destination, attracting visitors from around the world. The mosque has been in use since August 2008. There are no barriers that separate male and female pilgrims inside the mosque. A male prayer room exists on the first floor and a female prayer room is on the second floor. Attached to the mosque is a small residence for the imam, an administrative office, a library, and a multipurpose room.
