= Consulate-General of Indonesia, Houston =

Consular representation of Indonesia in the United States

Coordinates: 29.7285°N 95.5686°W

Consulate-General of Indonesia, Houston Konsulat Jenderal Republik Indonesia di Houston

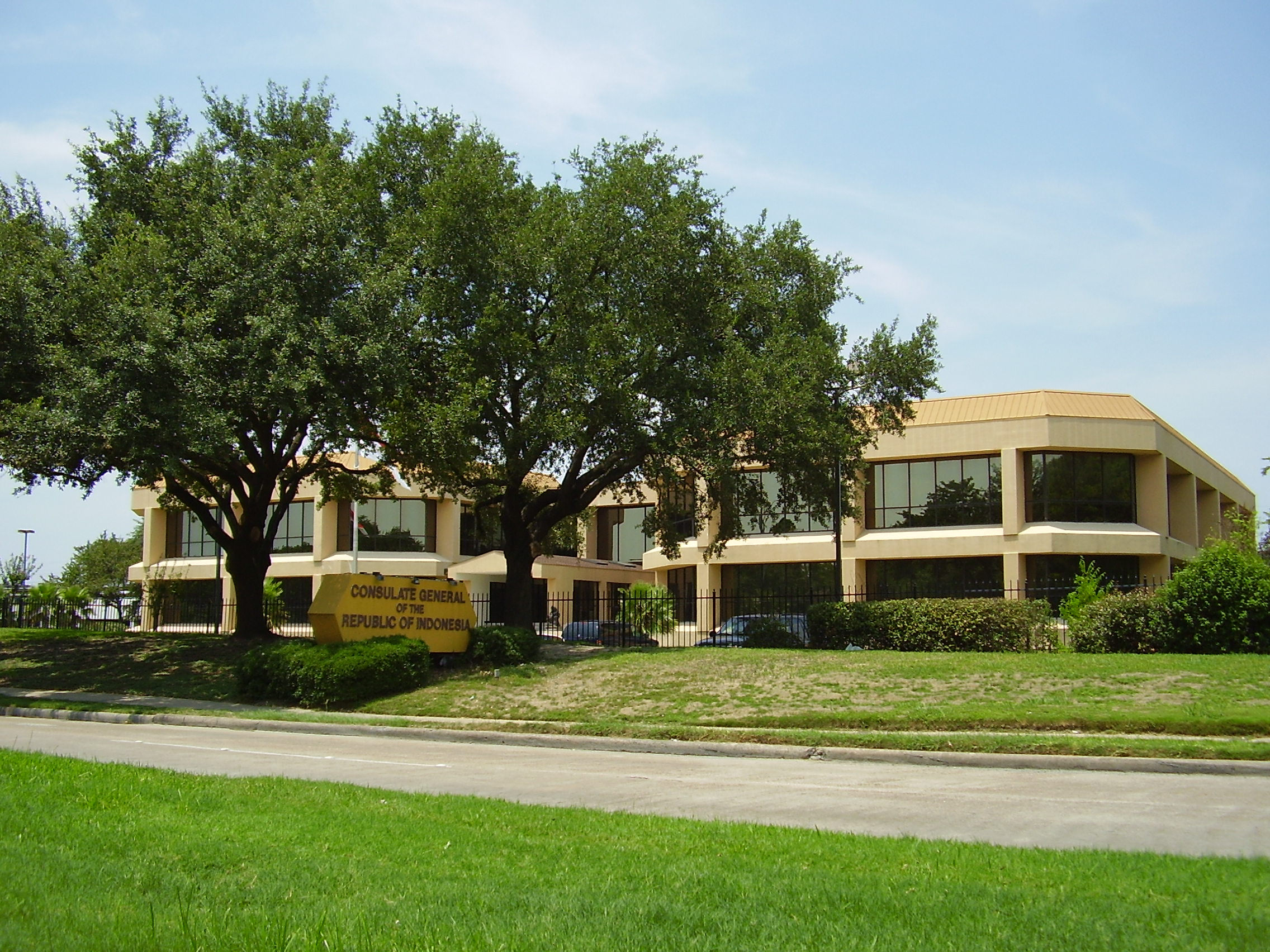
- Location: Houston, Texas
- Address: 10900 Richmond Avenue; Houston, Texas 77042
- Consul General: Ourina Ritonga
- Website: https://kemlu.go.id/houston/en

The Consulate General of the Republic of Indonesia in Houston (Indonesian: Konsulat Jendral Republik Indonesia di Houston) is Indonesia's diplomatic facility in Houston, Texas, United States.

The building is located at 10900 Richmond Avenue in the Westchase district. The facility serves the U.S. states of Arkansas, Alabama, Florida, Georgia, Louisiana, Mississippi, New Mexico, Oklahoma, Tennessee, and Texas. In addition, the Houston consulate serves Puerto Rico and the U.S. Virgin Islands. The consulate includes an exhibit of Indonesian culture.

As of 2004, Houston had the fifth largest Indonesian population in the United States; this helps sustain the consulate.

== History ==
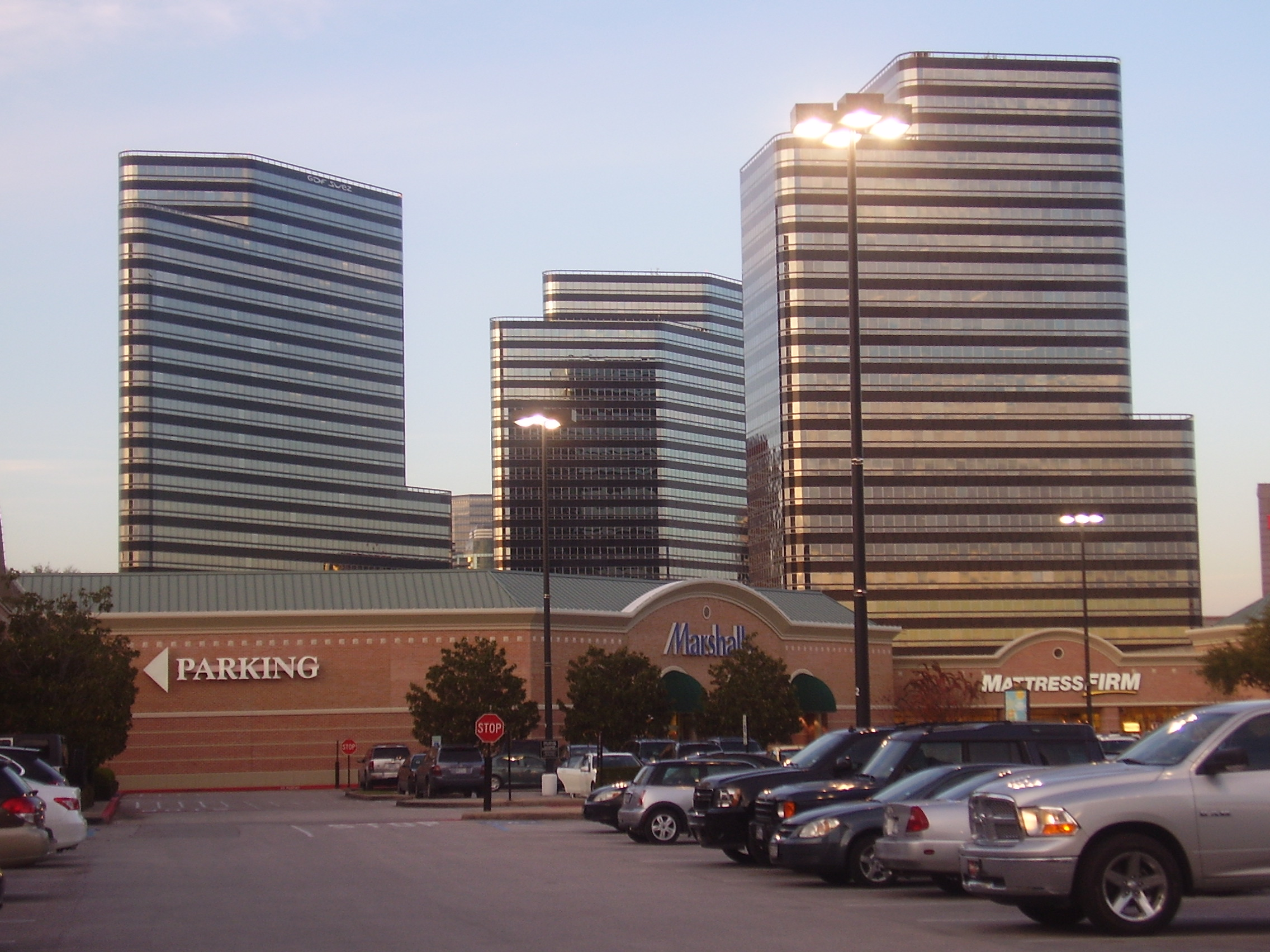
From 1982 to 1988 the consulate was in Three Post Oak Central, one of the three striped buildings in the picture

The Indonesian consulate opened on May 25, 1982 with Rachadi Iskandar as the first consul general. From its founding until March 1988, the consulate existed on the 19th floor of Three Post Oak Central, an Uptown Houston skyscraper, part of the Post Oak Central complex. In April 1988 the consulate moved to 5633 Richmond Avenue. In 1993, consul general Achmad Surjadi purchased the 44,815-square-foot (4,163.4 m^{2}) building located at 10900 Richmond Avenue.

The consulate coordinated some relief efforts for victims of the Banda Aceh tsunami generated by the 2004 Indian Ocean earthquake and, later in 2005, Hurricane Katrina. For the typhoon victims, nearly 500 boxes of clothing and other supplies were shipped to Medan and more than $50,000 U.S. dollars in cash donations was received. Fund-raising events for Hurricane Katrina victims raised $7,500.

== See also ==
- Diplomatic missions of Indonesia
