= History of Chinese Americans in Houston =

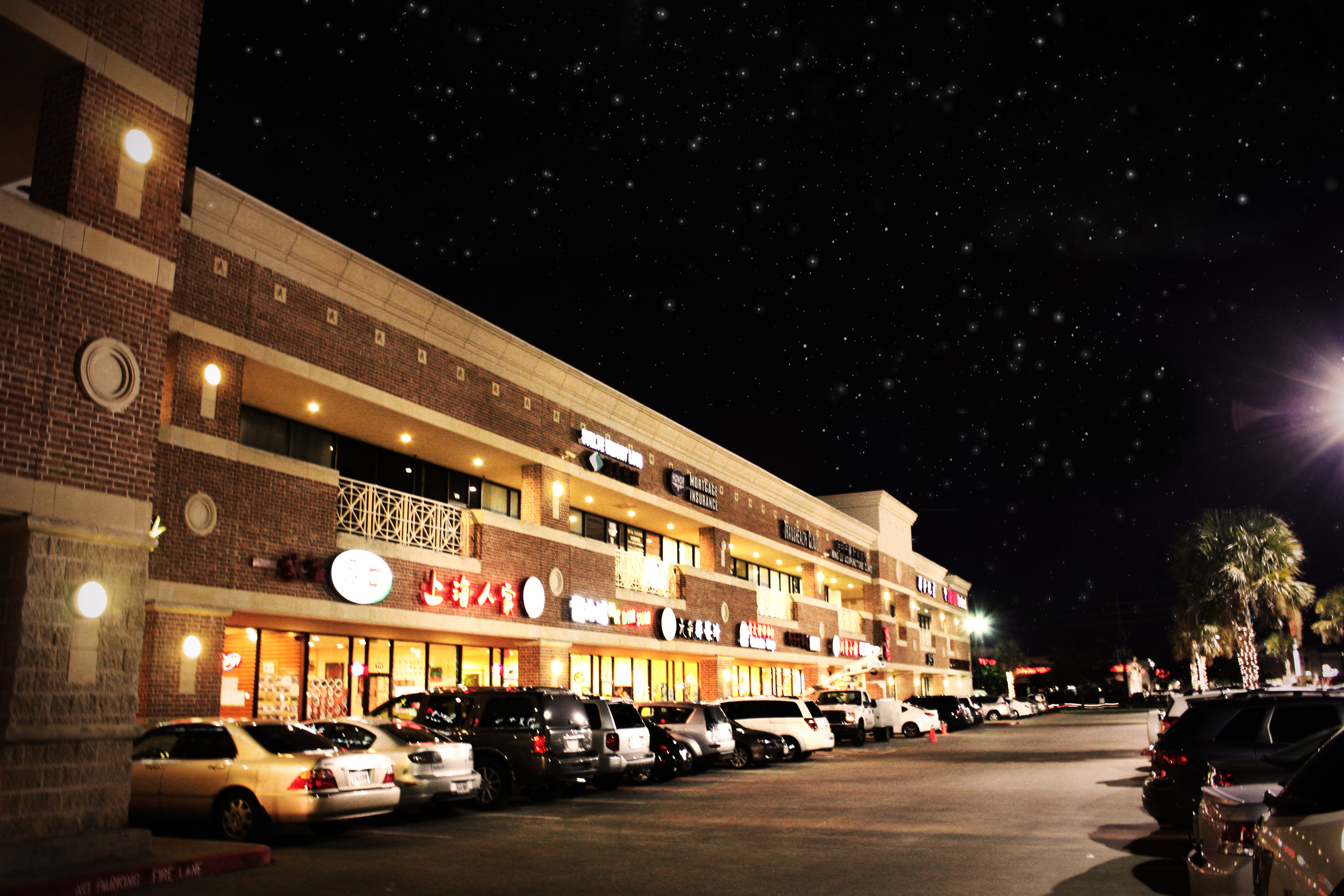
Chinatown on Bellaire Boulevard in Southwest Houston

The population of the area of Houston, Texas in the US includes a large number of people with Chinese ancestral backgrounds. According to the American Community Survey, as of 2013, Greater Houston (Houston-Sugar Land-Baytown metropolitan area) has 72,320 residents of Chinese origin.

== History ==
The first Chinese to enter Houston were 250 men coming in 1870 to do construction work. The Daily Houston Telegraph, in January of that year, stated that 247 Chinese docked in Galveston and went onwards in the region. The 1877 Houston City Directory listed three ethnic Chinese who worked in laundries, and the 1880 United States census, the first to count the Chinese in Houston, showed 7 Chinese residents in there. Anthony Knapp and Igor Vojnovic, authors of "Ethnicity in an Immigrant Gateway City: The Asian Condition in Houston", described the Chinese population of Houston at the time as being small.

A report stated that circa 1901 Houston had 43 ethnic Chinese. The Chinese Exclusion Act was made permanent in 1902, and this convinced some ethnic Chinese to abandon Houston, as the same report stated that the population was down to 27 that year. Nester Rodriguez, author of "Hispanic and Asian Immigration Waves in Houston," concluded that most of the original men from 1870 left Houston. The first Chinese business district opened in the early 1900s. The city government had a "Chinese inspector" to look for traces of illegal activities related to vices, and Knapp and Vojnovic wrote that Houstonians at the time felt threatened by the ethnic Chinese presence.

During the Great Depression, some Chinese moved from rural Mississippi to Houston. They had operated small stores in Mississippi but they decided to move because many of their previous clientele, African-Americans, left the state during the Great Migration.

In the late 1930s there were fewer than 50 Chinese in Houston. At that time, most families of Chinese ethnicity operated restaurants and small groceries. They usually lived in residences behind their business or in residences on the upper floors of the buildings housing their businesses. Due to racial discrimination they were unable to join labor unions or obtain high-quality jobs.

The number of Chinese in Houston increased to 121 by the start of World War II. During the war, many Chinese from southern states migrated to take advantage of the economy and the population increased by more than twice its size. In addition, the Chinese Exclusion Act was revoked in 1943, and the Chinese Communist Revolution replaced the government in the Mainland in 1949, causing more people to leave China. The revolution and repeal prompted additional assimilation among those in Houston. However, there were still under 1,000 persons of Chinese origin in 1950 in the area, with about 500 in the city. As ethnic Chinese could not gain entrance into professional schools at the time, the majority worked in businesses such as groceries and restaurants.

In the early 1950s the Chinese Merchants' Association moved into an area in the southeastern edge of Downtown Houston in what is today East Downtown, and this Chinatown grew during the 1970s. This area is currently referred to as the "Old Chinatown", and still contains some notable landmarks including the original Kim Sơn restaurant. Many Chinese businesses have since moved out, and the area is currently undergoing re-development.

In 1960 there were about 325 people in the city of Houston of Chinese origins. In the 1960s there were about 2,500 ethnic Chinese in the Houston area.

In the decade of the 1970s the first schools teaching the Chinese language appeared.

By 1983 there were about 30,000 people of Chinese origin in the Houston area. The first businesses of the new Houston Chinatown, located near Bellaire and Beltway 8, opened that year. The new Chinatown began to expand in the 1990s when local Asian-American entrepreneurs moved their businesses from older neighborhoods, especially the "Old Chinatown" in a search for more inexpensive properties. Knapp and Vojnovic stated that by in the 1980s Houstonians, along with local media outlets and the government agencies, "touted" them "as a cultural and economic asset."

In 2000 the estimate of the Chinese American population in Houston was 24,000. Moises Mendoza of the Houston Chronicle said in 2010 that "the population is thought to have grown by tens of thousands" since the 2000 estimate.

In 2001 Gordon Quan, a member of the Houston City Council, urged Asian Americans and Chinese Americans to become more involved in politics.

Additional growth of the Chinese American community in Houston continued into the twenty-first century, supported by ongoing immigration and natural population increase. By the 2010s, Chinese Americans represented one of the largest Asian ethnic groups in the Houston metropolitan area, contributing significantly to the city’s economic and cultural development.

The expansion of Houston’s Chinatown along Bellaire Boulevard further strengthened the community’s economic presence, with hundreds of businesses including restaurants, supermarkets, and professional services serving both Chinese Americans and a broader multicultural population. This area has become one of the largest and most active Asian commercial districts in the southern United States.

In addition to economic contributions, Chinese Americans in Houston have increasingly participated in civic and political life. The election and public service of figures such as Gordon Quan reflects the growing political visibility of the community. Community organizations, cultural festivals, and educational institutions have also expanded, supporting both cultural preservation and integration into the broader Houston society.

== Timeline ==
- 1870 – About 250 Chinese men arrived in the Houston area for construction work; the Daily Houston Telegraph reported that 247 Chinese laborers docked in Galveston and traveled onward.
- 1877 – The Houston City Directory listed three Chinese residents working in laundries.
- 1880 – The United States Census recorded 7 Chinese residents in Houston.
- 1901 – The Chinese population reached about 43 individuals.
- 1902 – The Chinese Exclusion Act was made permanent, contributing to a population decline to 27.
- 1930s – Chinese migrants moved from Mississippi to Houston during the Great Depression.
- Late 1930s – Fewer than 50 Chinese lived in Houston, most operating small businesses.
- 1943 – The Chinese Exclusion Act was repealed, allowing renewed immigration.
- 1949 – The Chinese Communist Revolution prompted additional migration from China.
- 1950 – Fewer than 1,000 people of Chinese origin lived in the Houston area, with about 500 in the city.
- Early 1950s – The Chinese Merchants' Association established itself in East Downtown, forming the early Chinatown.
- 1960 – About 325 Chinese lived in the city of Houston; about 2,500 in the metropolitan area.
- 1970s – Chinese language schools began to appear, and the original Chinatown expanded.
- 1983 – The Chinese population reached about 30,000; the new Chinatown near Bellaire Boulevard and Beltway 8 began to develop.
- 1990s – The new Chinatown expanded as businesses relocated from older areas.
- 2000 – The Chinese American population in Houston was estimated at about 24,000.
- 2001 – Houston City Council member Gordon Quan encouraged greater political participation among Chinese Americans.

== Geography ==
The first Chinatown in Houston was in the northern part of Downtown Houston. This shifted to what is the Old Chinatown by the 1970s as skyscrapers had replaced many of the buildings in northern Downtown. The New Chinatown began development in the 1980s.

== Demographics ==
According to the 2010 Census there were 43,940 persons of Chinese descent in Harris County, making up 15.7% of all Asians in the county. This figure includes those with origins from Mainland China, Taiwan, and Hong Kong. In 2010 the ethnic Chinese were the second largest Asian ethnic group in Fort Bend County, making up 21% of that county's Asians. As of the same year the ethnic Chinese were the second largest Asian ethnic group in Montgomery County.

Prior to the 1950s most Chinese in Houston were Cantonese people and often were not formally educated. In 1980 the ethnic Chinese were Harris County's largest Asian population. In 1990 there were 25,019 persons of Chinese/Taiwanese descent, making up 22.8% of the Asians in the county. By then the origins of ethnic Chinese, in addition to those from other parts of the U.S., were from Mainland China, Taiwan, Singapore, and Hong Kong. By 1990 the Chinese were Harris County's second largest Asian community after the Vietnamese. In 2000 there were 34,673 persons of Chinese/Taiwanese descent, making up 18% of the Asians in the county. If the Indian, Pakistani, and Bangladeshi populations of Harris County are combined into a single group, then in 2000 the Chinese were the third largest Asian ethnic group, slightly behind the second-largest Indian/Pakistani/Bangladeshi group. From 2000 to 2010 the ethnic Chinese population in Harris County grew by 27%.

== Transportation ==
In 2013 Air China announced that it would begin nonstop service from Beijing to Houston. Xu Erwen (Chinese: 许尔文), the consul general of the Consulate-General of China in Houston, said that the new flight "means a lot" to Houston's Chinese population.

In 2015 EVA Air began services to Taipei from Houston. Mayor of Houston Annise Parker stated that the growing Asian population of Houston made this flight an important one.

In 2004 China Airlines started a flight from Houston to Taipei stopping in Seattle, making it the first Asian carrier to fly to Houston. The airline stated that many Taiwanese companies had offices in Houston. In 2008, China Airlines announced that it was discontinuing service to Houston. When the China Airlines service was in operation the airline had a private bus service to Sugar Land and Southwest Houston Chinatown.

== Media ==
Southern News Group, a publishing business owned by a Chinese American, has its headquarters in Houston.

The Southwest Chinese Journal once served ethnic Chinese Houstonians.

By 2020 WeChat was commonly in use among recent Mainland immigrants.

== Economy ==
Circa the 1870s the first Chinese laundry was established. Circa 1930 the first ethnic Chinese grocery business was Quong Yick, operated by C. Y. Chu. When Chinese laundries were no longer widely patronized, ethnic Chinese began operating restaurants; at the time not many non-Chinese in the area were interested in eating Chinese-style food, so initially restaurants served American food instead.

In 1937 there was a bill in the Texas Senate to have property of deceased Asian Americans in urban areas be returned to the state instead of giving to heirs, and non-Asian owners of grocery businesses wished to remove competition and therefore sponsored the bill. However the bill was removed while in committee after two Asian Americans testified against the bill: they were Houston resident Edward King Tung (E. K. T.) Chen and San Antonio resident Rose Wu.

== Institutions ==
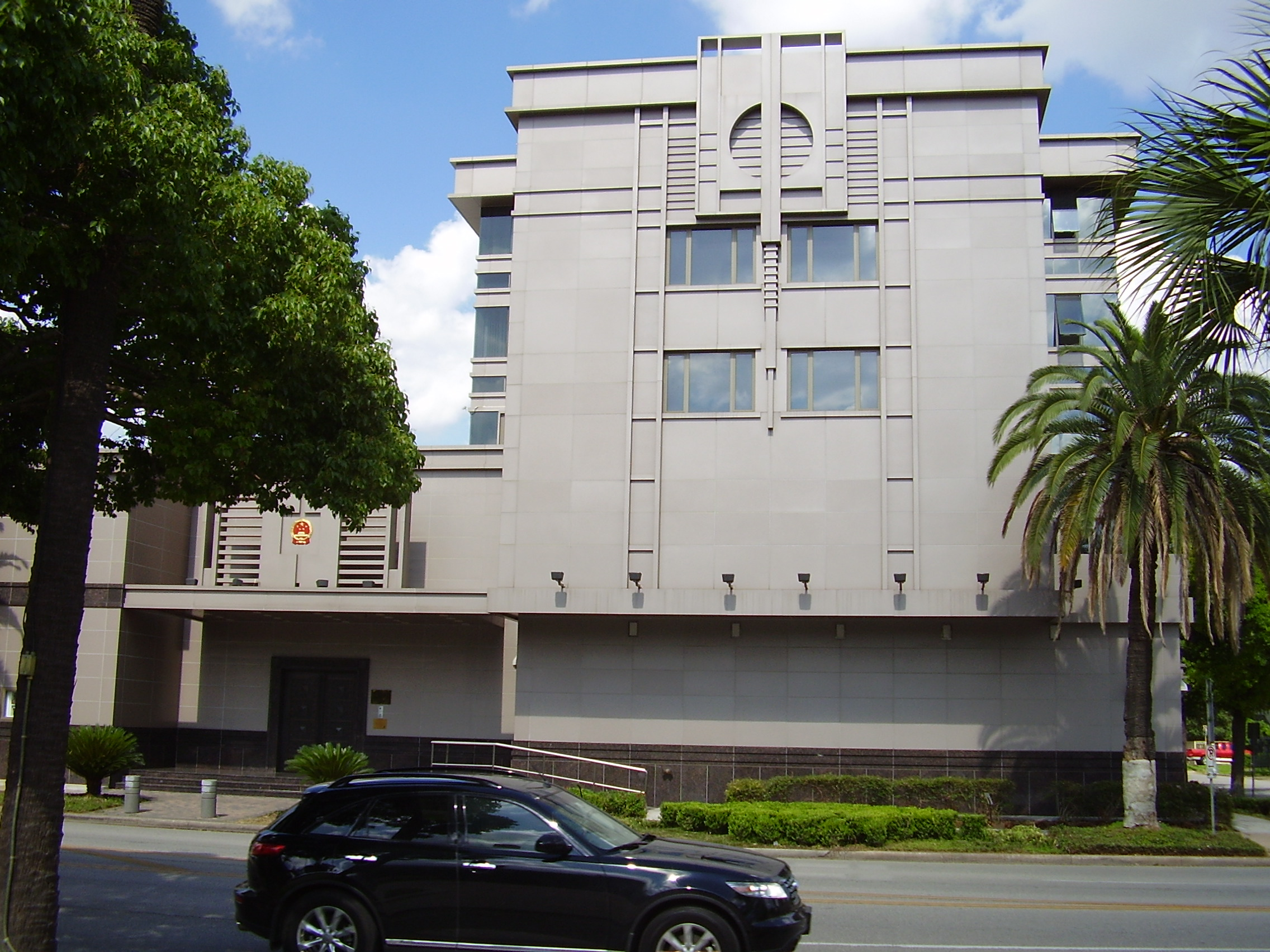
Consulate-General of the People's Republic of China in Houston (closed in 2020)

The Taipei Economic and Cultural Office in Houston of Taiwan (Republic of China) is located in Greenway Plaza. The Taiwanese mission also has the Chinese Cultural Center in the Westchase district.

In the era before the Repeal of the Chinese Exclusion Act, the area Chinese consulate advocated for the rights of ethnic Chinese in the city as ethnic Chinese at the time had limited rights. The People's Republic of China operated the Consulate-General of the People's Republic of China in Houston in Montrose, from 1979 until 2020.

The Chinese Community Center (CCC, traditional Chinese: 休士頓中華文化服務中心; simplified Chinese: 休士顿中华文化服务中心; pinyin: Xiūshìdùn Zhōnghuá Wénhuà Fúwù Zhōngxīn, "Houston Chinese Culture Service Center"), an IRS 501(c)(3) organization and a United Way affiliate, is located in the Bellaire Chinatown. The facility opened in 1979 as the Chinese Language School. The CCC has several levels of English classes offered daily. As of 2006, at CCC about 80% of the students have university degrees, and the other 20% are the companions of the students with university degrees.

A Taiwanese Community Center, run by the Taiwanese American Association, also exists in Bellaire Chinatown. It was opened in 1992 by Taiwanese immigrants led by Dr. Yu Yan-Lee who pooled their resources to have a community center independent from the CCC, which is believed to solely represent the interests of Mainland Chinese. The TCC has since become a proponent of the pro-Taiwanese Independence movement. Its political organization, the Taiwanese Heritage Society of Houston, has hosted political figures such as Texas State Representative Hubert Vo and ROC President Tsai Ing-Wen. The TCC also operates a school teaching traditional Chinese and Taiwanese cultural events.

In the early years of the Chinese community, the Chinese Association of Houston and the On Leong Chinese Merchants Association, the latter having its meeting room in east Houston, were present. The first umbrella organization for ethnic Chinese was Wah Kew of Houston. E. K. T. Chen was elected president in the 1940s.

The Houston Lodge of the Chinese American Citizens Alliance (CACA) was established in 1954. Edward C. M. Chen, the son of E. K. T. Chen, wrote in "An American Chinese in Houston" that this chapter in the 1960s "came into national prominence". Edward C. Chen later was elected as the head of this chapter and was the youngest person elected as such.

The Houston Asian American Archive, founded in 2010 by Dr Anne S. Chao, is a research archive as part of the outreach arm of Chao Center for Asian Studies, Rice University, is housed at the Woodson Research Center, Fondren Library. The archive has documented oral history interviews of a significant number of Chinese Americans in Houston, in English, Mandarin or Cantonese.

== Language ==
Historically the Mandarin-speaking and Cantonese-speaking groups were distinct, with the latter readily adopting American culture. Jessica Chew, author of "Vietnamese and Chinese American Cultures: Destination Houston," stated that the former "represent a more elitist culture".

== Cuisine ==
There has been Viet Hoa (ethnic Chinese) influence on Vietnamese cuisine served in Houston. Suzanne Chew, mother of Jessica Chew, stated that the situation is a "Chinese mix".

The barbecue at Blood Bros. BBQ in Bellaire has Asian-American influences, with the co-owners being of Chinese ancestry.

== Politics ==
In the era before the Repeal of the Chinese Exclusion Act, the area Chinese lacked political clout, relying on the Chinese consulate to advocate on their behalf. In 1995 ethnic Chinese in the Houston area had a preference for the Republican Party. By 2013, due concerns about discrimination against Asians and immigration policies and the lessening importance of anti-Communism, the political preferences of ethnic Chinese shifted towards Democrats and independents.

Beverley Clark, of mixed Chinese and African-American origins, was elected to the Houston City Council in 1989, being the first city council member of Asian origins. Martha Wong, elected to the council in 1993, was the first person of majority Asian origins to be elected to the council.

== Education ==
In the era of de jure racial segregation in the United States ethnic Chinese in the Houston area were classified as white and therefore could get superior educational opportunities to the undergraduate level. However professional schools such as law, medical, and dental schools in the area rejected applications from ethnic Chinese, restricting their choices of careers. CACA successfully lobbied for the professional schools to accept ethnic Chinese.

E. K. T. Chen, the first university professor in the city of Chinese ancestry, was also the first graduate from the University of Houston of Chinese ancestry. He received his degree in the 1930s.

== Religion ==
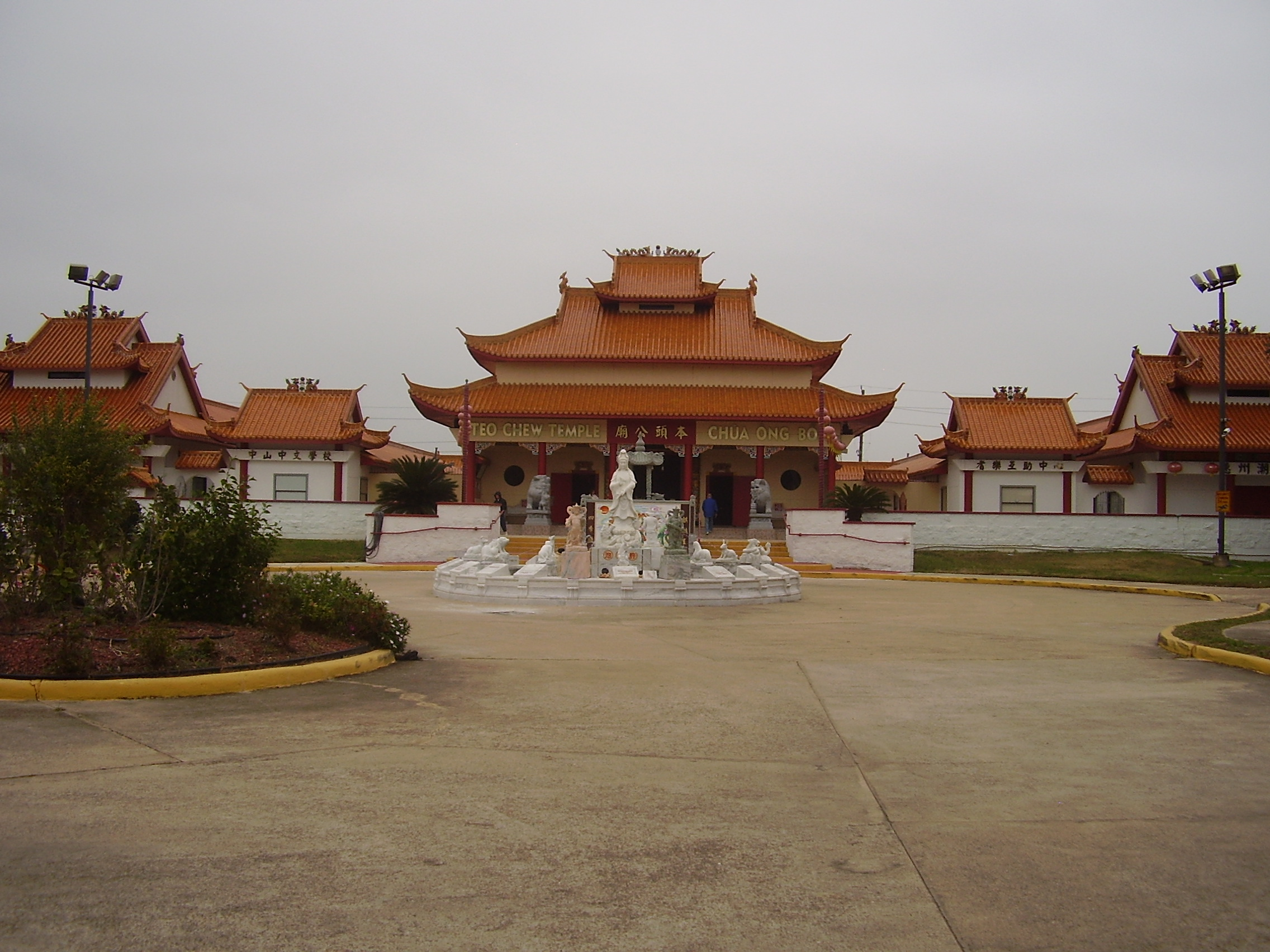
Texas Teo Chew Temple

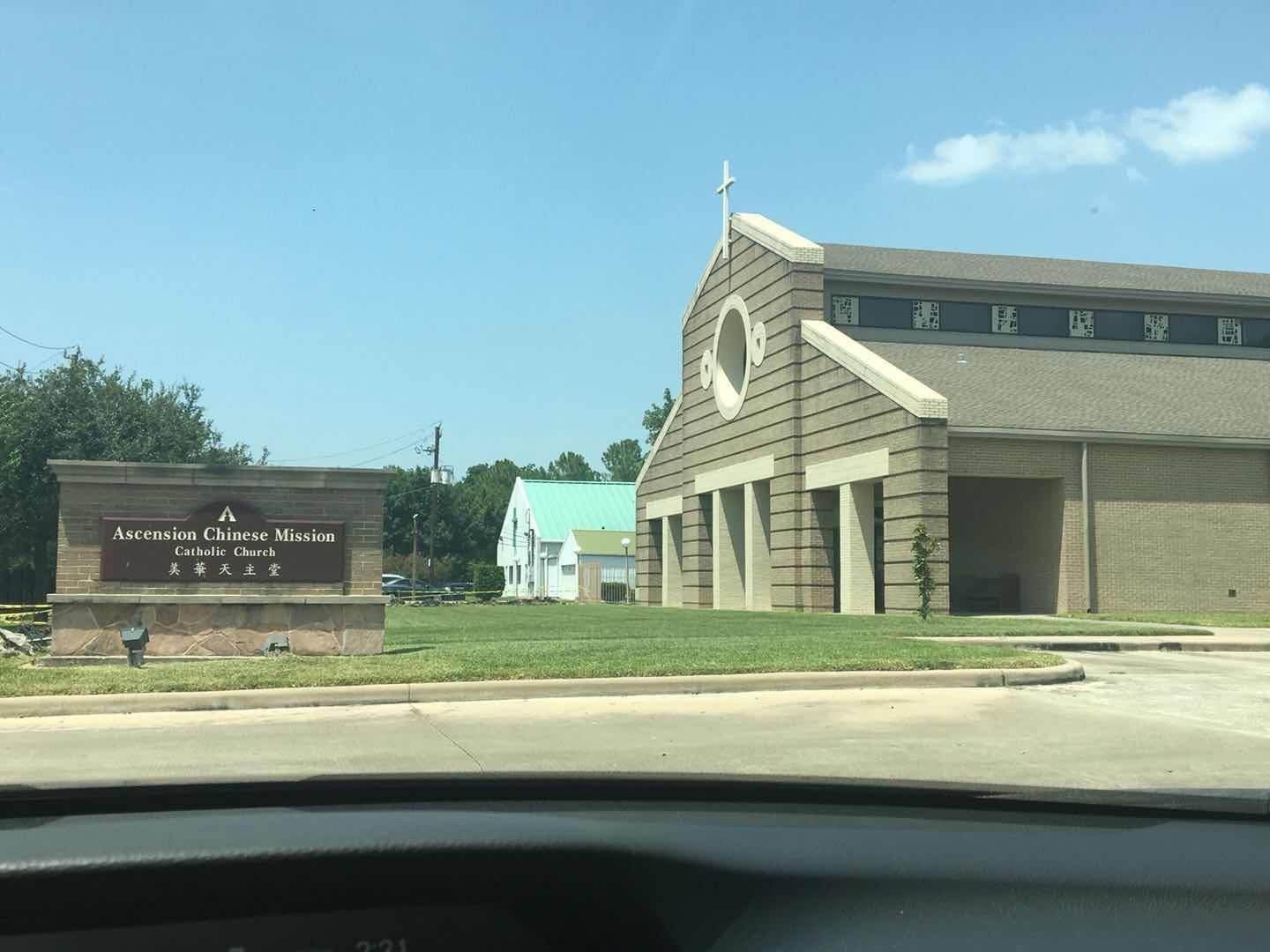
Ascension Chinese Mission (美華天主堂)

The Texas Teo Chew Temple (德州潮州會館本頭公廟; 德州潮州会馆本头公庙; Dézhōu Cháozhōu Huìguǎn Běntóu Gōngmiào; Vietnamese: Chùa Ông Bổn) is operated by the Teochew people, including those who originated from Vietnam.

Fo Guang Shan Chung Mei Temple (佛光山中美寺; Fó Guāng Shān Zhōng Měi Sì) is a Buddhist Temple located in Stafford, Texas.

A Taoist temple, Texas Guandi Temple (德州關帝廟; 德州关帝庙; Dézhōu Guāndì Miào) is located in East Downtown. The temple was established in 1999 by a Vietnamese couple, Charles Loi Ngo and Carolyn, the former originating from China. They decided to build a temple to Guan Yu (Guandi) after surviving an aggravated robbery which occurred at their store in the Fifth Ward. They believed that Guandi saved their lives during the incident. A Vietnamese refugee named Charles Lee coordinated the donations and funding so the temple could be built; Lee stated his motivation was to thank the United States for welcoming him and saving his life when he arrived in 1978. The construction materials and architectural design originated from China. A representation of Buddha and a golden Lord Brahma originated from Thailand. The temple is open to followers of all religions, and it has perfumed halls. Ming Shui Huang was appointed volunteer manager in 2000.

In 1999 the Houston area had 350 Chinese Catholic families. Ascension Chinese Mission (美華天主堂; 美华天主堂; Měi Huà Tiānzhǔ Táng; 'US-China Catholic Church') originated from a Chinese worship service that was established in the 1970s. The parish was created in 1988, initially operating out of a commercial center in the southwest Houston Chinatown area. It relocated to its current site in Spring 1991.

== Recreation ==
The Lunar New Year (Chinese New Year) is celebrated in Houston, and Miss Chinatown is held at that time. Other recreational events occur during the holiday.

The Dragoneers youth social club for Chinese Americans met at Chinese Baptist Church.

== Literature ==
Edward M. Chen compiled oral histories and wrote a chapter about the history of the ethnic Chinese published in the 1984 book The Ethnic Groups in Houston, edited by Fred von der Mehden. Edward Chen, in 1980, had organized an exhibit at UH about the Chinese community, titled "Centennial of the History of Chinese in Houston since 1880."

== Notable individuals ==
- Gordon Quan (Houston City Council member)
- Martha Wong (Houston City Council member) - Houston Heights
- KevJumba (Kevin Wu) - Comedian and actor
- Denny Huang (黃柏鈞) Chinese American Movie Star
- Cindy Yen Taiwanese American Pop Star
- Terry Chang Gee (died 2012) became a volunteer in Chinese American causes. Quan said "He's considered one of the pioneers of the Chinese community."
- Yao Ming played for Houston Rockets from 2002 to 2011
- Edward King Tung Chen (Former Deputy Counsul Republic of China and First Chinese Professor in Houston{ Prevented Internment of Chinese during the Korean War by working with FBI) [28]An Application for an Official Texas Historical Marker for Edward King Tung Chen 1909-1957 Newspaperman, Diplomat, Scholar, Professor, Patriot American, Texan, Houstonian of Chinese Ancestry by Edward Chuck Ming Chen
- Gene Wu (member of the Texas House of Representatives)

== See also ==
- Demographics of Houston
- History of Vietnamese Americans in Houston
- MetroCorp Bancshares
- History of Chinese American in Austin TX
- History of Chinese Americans in Texas
- History of the Chinese Americans in Dallas-Fort Worth
