= Shanghai State Security Bureau =

Shanghai branch of China's Ministry of State Security

Coordinates: 31.1917°N 121.4670°E

- Chinese: 上海市国家安全局
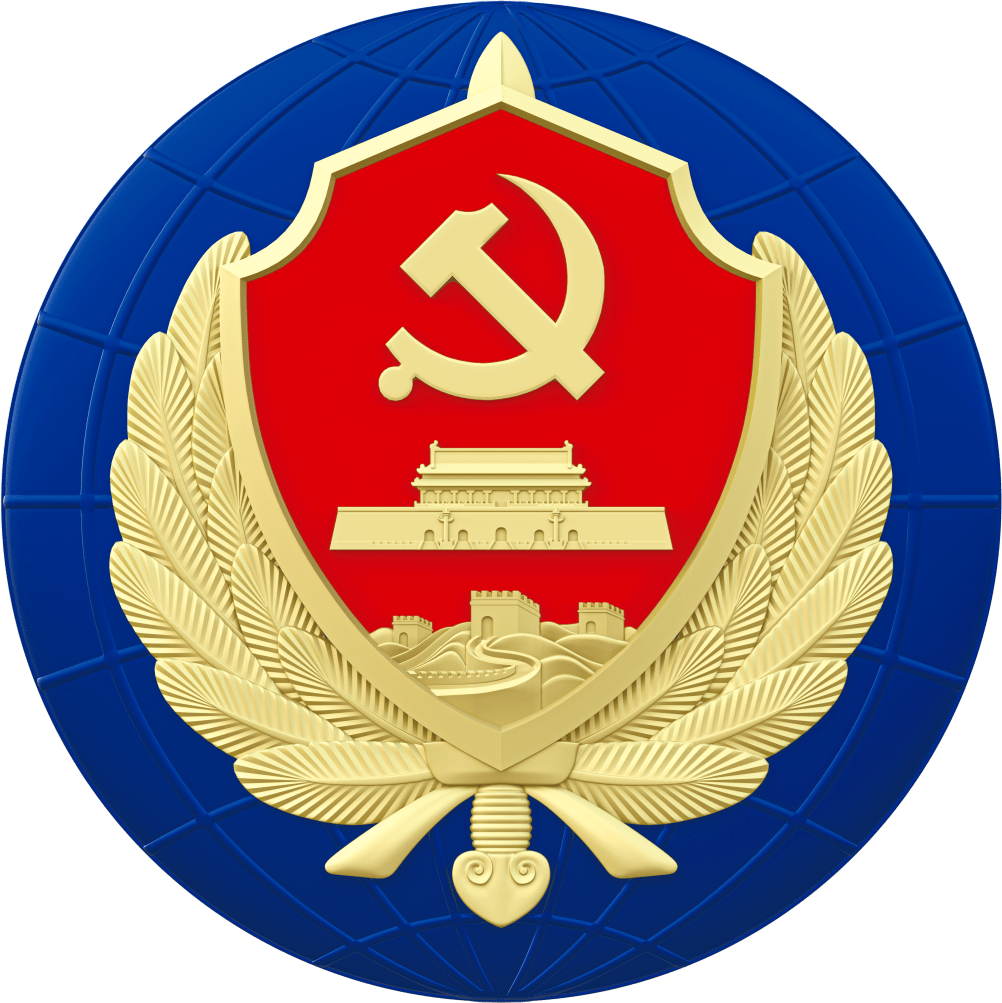
- Seal of the Ministry of State Security

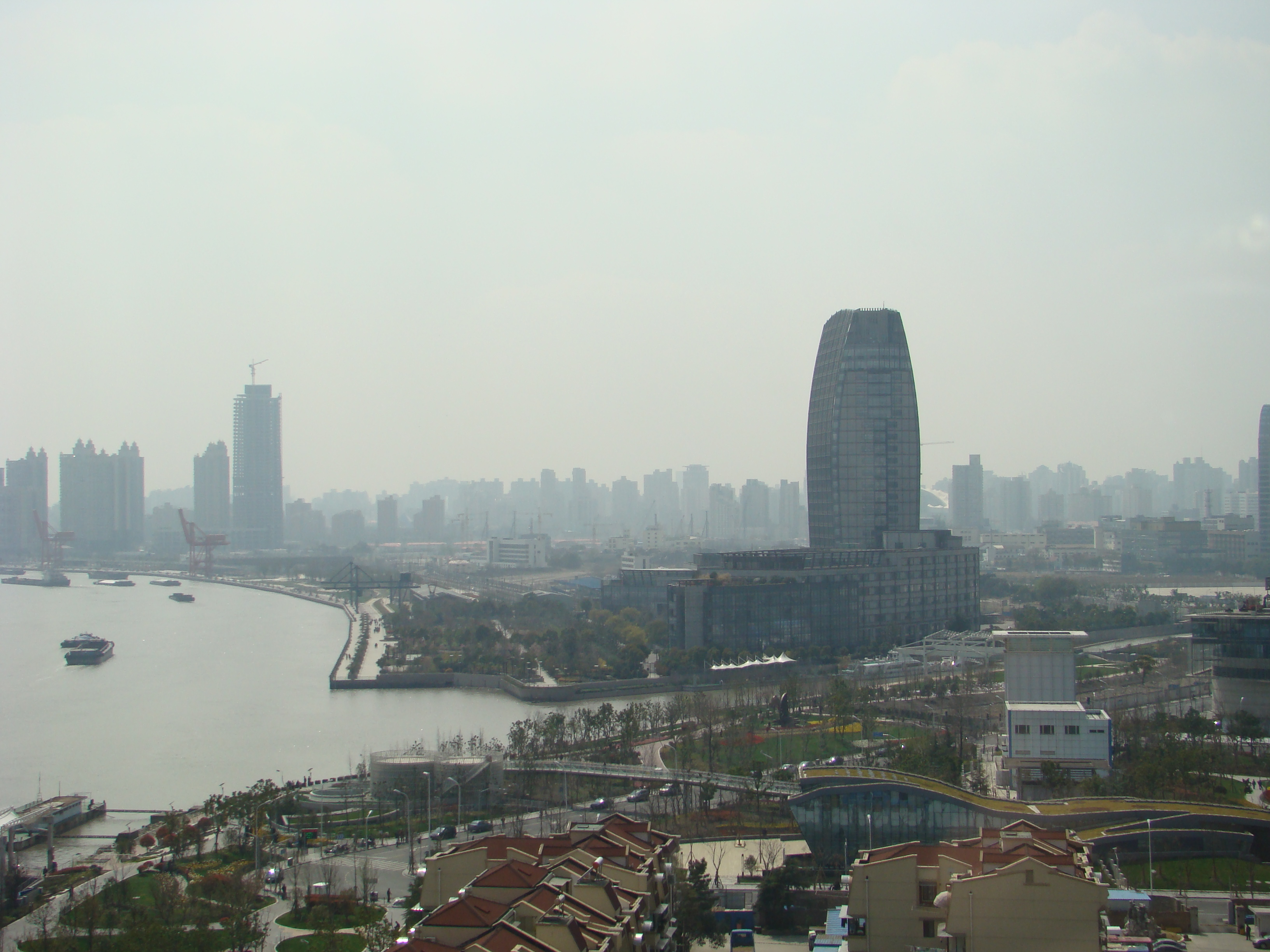
- SSSB headquarters as seen from the Lupu Bridge with the Huangpu river at left

Agency overview
- Formed: April 1984; 42 years ago
- Preceding agency: Shanghai Public Security Bureau
- Jurisdiction: Shanghai, China
- Headquarters: 1 Ruining Road, Xuhui District, Shanghai, China
- Employees: Classified, at least 10,000
- Annual budget: Classified
- Agency executive: Zhu Weikang, Director
- Parent department: Central National Security Commission; Central Political and Legal Affairs Commission; Shanghai Municipal Party Committee
- Parent ministry: Ministry of State Security
- Child agency: Hafnium group
- Website: www.shjsb.gov.cn

Shanghai State Security Bureau
- Simplified Chinese: 上海市国家安全局
Transcriptions
Standard Mandarin
- Hanyu Pinyin: Shànghǎi Shì Guójiā Ānquán Jú

Shanghai Secrecy Administration Bureau
- Simplified Chinese: 上海市国家保密局
Transcriptions
Standard Mandarin
- Hanyu Pinyin: Shànghǎi Shì Guójiā Bǎomì Jú

The Shanghai State Security Bureau (SSSB; Chinese: 上海市国家安全局) is a municipal bureau of China's Ministry of State Security (MSS) charged with intelligence operations in the country's most populous city. With tens of thousands of employees, it is one of the most aggressive and internationally active units of the MSS, conducting long-term global foreign espionage operations and major cyberespionage campaigns which stretch far beyond the Shanghai metropolis. The bureau acts in concert with the Shanghai Municipal Party Secrecy Committee, and the two represent themselves publicly as one institution, a front called the Shanghai Municipal State Secrecy Administration Bureau (Chinese: 上海市国家保密局).

The Shanghai bureau is one of the most prolific MSS units targeting the United States; it also runs the Hafnium hacking group, and conducts elaborate operations to target and influence the Buddhist community in Asia. The bureau maintains an "immense business empire" of front companies in property development, international shipping and telecommunications, and operates at least 18 subordinate branch offices, one in every administrative division of the city.

The headquarters of the SSSB is 1 Ruining Road in the Xuhui District near the Lupu Bridge. The building is bordered on three sides by water, situated at the confluence of the Huangpu river which bisects the entire city, and the Rihui river which serves as the border between the Xuhui and Huangpu districts. The building is a glass high rise office tower with space for 10,000 employees. It is the largest of several large SSSB facilities in the city.

== History and domestic operations ==
The work of the Shanghai State Security Bureau was originally performed by the Investigation Department of the Shanghai Municipal Committee of the CCP, which was established in June 1955, this later evolved into the Shanghai Public Security Bureau (PSB) of the Ministry of Public Security (MPS). In April 1984, the MSS was established, taking over intelligence functions previously handled by the MPS. With it, the Public Security Bureau transferred its counterespionage and intelligence components to the new State Security Bureau.

Due to its location in Shanghai, the Bureau benefits from local access to world class universities, think tanks, businesses and infrastructure from which it recruits staff and foreigners.

In 2016, The New York Times reported on a bureau recruitment flyer distributed to Shanghai universities, which sought majors in English, Japanese, German, French, and Russian and students with knowledge of Tibetan, Uyghur, Kazakh, Mongolian, as well as Hokkien, Hakka and Cantonese, suggesting the bureau is focused on foreign intelligence targets, counterintelligence coverage of foreigners inside China, and domestic intelligence work for monitoring the Chinese Communist Party (CCP)’s internal enemies.

=== Branch offices ===
The SSSB has a bureau in the Pudong New Area, and branch offices in Luwan, Zhabei, Xuhui, Baoshan, Jing'an, Huangpu, Yangpu, Hongkou, Changning, Putuo, Minhang, Jiading, Nanhui, Songjiang, Jinshan, Qingpu, and Fengxian districts of Shanghai.

=== Targeting of Buddhists ===
The SSSB is heavily involved in targeting the Buddhist community. Nanshan Temple, a prominent religious complex in Hainan with the Guanyin of Nanshan statue, is owned by an SSSB front, and has become a leading platform for influence operations against the Buddhist populations of southeast Asia, and countering Indian Buddhist influence.

== Overseas intelligence activities ==
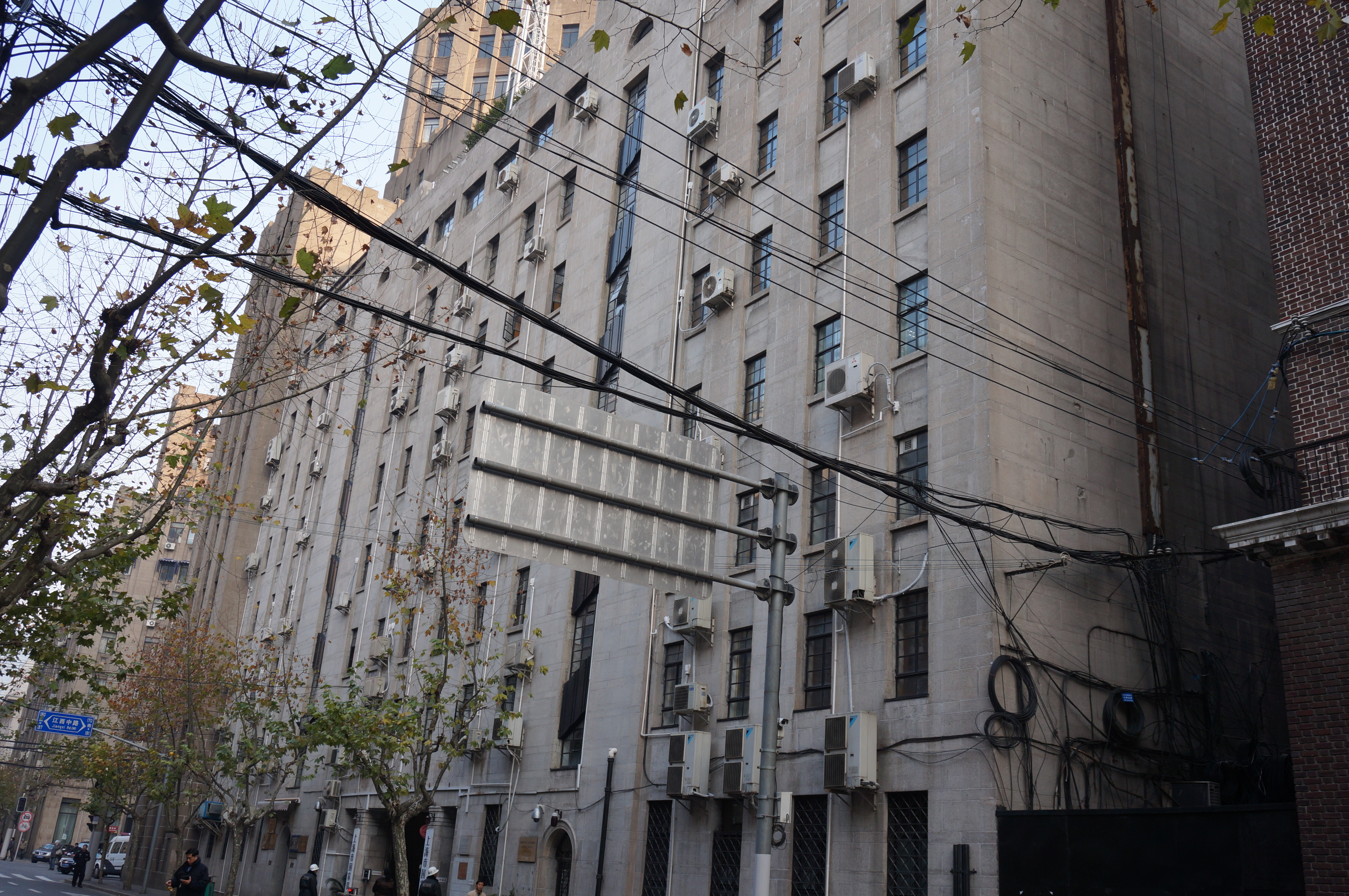
The listing address of the SSSB is in this former police precinct at 185 Fuzhou Road in the Huangpu District.

According to The New York Times, in 2003 and 2004, the SSSB blackmailed a cryptographer at the Japanese Consulate in Shanghai who had an affair with a prostitute to provide the personal information of a Japanese diplomat. In 2004, the staff member committed suicide. According to a report from the Shūkan Bunshun, a suicide note addressed to the consul general said that Chinese intelligence agents threatened him with providing Japanese diplomatic secrets on the grounds that he had an abnormal relationship with a girl in a karaoke bar, but he was unwilling to sell state secrets.

In recent years it's approached numerous current and retired US government officials, as well as scholars and journalists, successfully recruiting some and paying them to hand over sensitive information.

=== Operations against the United States ===
The SSSB has long been heavily involved in espionage against the United States, particularly in recruiting human intelligence (HUMINT) sources. High-profile American agents of the SSSB caught by US authorities have included Kevin Patrick Mallory, Candace Claiborne, Glenn Duffie Shriver, and Alexander Yuk Ching Ma. The intelligence sought by SSSB case officers in these cases have tended to involve internal US policy deliberations and internal State Department reactions to talks with China.

FBI officials in the Mallory case testified that "since at least 2014, the FBI has assessed that the…SSSB…has [had] a close relationship with Shanghai Academy of Social Sciences and uses SASS employees as spotters and assessors" and "has further assessed that SSSB intelligence officers have also used SASS affiliation as cover identities."

Sinologist Peter Mattis described the Shanghai bureau's method of recruiting as "a high-volume model of casting a wide net to see whoever they can reel in. If they get one in 10 or one in 20 to bite, that works for them."

Separately, a freelance journalist focused on Asian affairs received SSSB requests for information from the US State Department or National Security Council related to US policy in Burma, contacts with North Korea, and talks with Cambodia related to the South China Sea.

=== Cyber espionage ===
Following a July 2025 arrest by U.S. and Italian authorities at Malpensa Airport in Milan, the U.S. Department of Justice charged 33-year-old Shanghainese man Xu Zewei with cyber espionage as part of the Hafnium hacking group, also known as Silk Typhoon, which prosecutors revealed is a subsidiary of the Shanghai State Security Bureau. The indictment states that Xu was an employee of the Shanghai Powerock Network, an independent contractor hired by the SSSB to augment Hafnium and its hacking operations.

Prosecutors said SSSB contractors exploited valuable zero-day vulnerabilities to steal groundbreaking COVID-19 research. They reported that Xu and other Hafnium hackers targeted over 12,700 email accounts, including researchers at the University of Texas Medical Branch and Galveston National Laboratory, particularly immunologists and virologists conducting research into COVID-19 vaccines. Xu and others reported on their progress to supervising officers at the SSSB.

James Lewis, a senior vice president at the Center for Strategic and International Studies, stated that it was likely the hacking operation was directed by the now-shuttered Chinese consulate in Houston:

"Absolutely, this is centrally directed," Lewis said "Beijing told its agents or its intelligence officers, here's a priority target, get on it, and because Houston was the place responsible for biotech espionage, it got the assignment."

The U.S. government ordered the Houston consulate to close in July 2020, citing prolific espionage activity stemming from the diplomatic post.

Later in 2021, Xu and others were heavily involved in the attacks on Microsoft Exchange Servers known by most as the Hafnium attacks, which attacked universities and global law firms. According to the indictment, Xu was ordered to search email mailboxes for terms like "Chinese sources," "MSS" and "HongKong" and other information regarding specific U.S. policymakers and government agencies.

The FBI shut down the hackers in 2021, after obtaining a court order that allowed agents to access hacked computers and remove malicious code installed on the machines.

Chinese Ministry of Foreign Affairs spokesperson Mao Ning told Reuters that the charges against Xu and one other accused Chinese spy who remains at large, represent a ploy to "maliciously smear China". Conversely, Xu's lawyer claimed that he was simply a victim of mistaken identity.

== Directors of the Shanghai State Security Bureau ==
Unlike other MSS components, the SSSB is believed not to provide much upward career mobility to other parts of the ministry. Cai Xumin is the only former SSSB director to have been promoted to MSS vice minister in Beijing, he was later moved back to Shanghai as the city's deputy procurator.

Founding SSSB chief Ding Shenglie (丁升烈) came from a background in the Central Investigation Department. As an ethnic Korean, during the Korean War he had been sent to Seoul to carry out clandestine operations.

=== List of directors ===
The directors of the SSSB have been:

No.	Director	Took office	Left office	Time in office	ref.
1	Ding Shenglie (丁升烈)	February 1984	June 1991	7 years	
2	Wang Yunzhang (汪云章)	June 1991	December 1995	4 years	
3	Cai Xumin (蔡旭敏)	December 1995	June 23, 2004	9 years	
4	Wu Zhonghai (吴中海)	June 23, 2004	February 15, 2012	8 years	
5	Zhu Xiaochao (朱小超)	February 15, 2012	2015	3 years	
6	Dong Weimin (董卫民)	2015	2020	5 years	
7	Huang Baokun (黄宝坤)	April 2020	2023	3 years	
8	Zhu Weikang (朱伟康)	2023	Incumbent	Incumbent	

== Insignia ==
Officially, the SSSB uses the MSS shield which displays the hammer and sickle emblem of the Chinese Communist Party, rather than the national emblem of China. In June 2014, the SSSB released a solicitation for public submissions for a logo for its cover, the Shanghai Secrecy Administration Bureau, choosing the final insignia from among the entrants.
