= Gordon Quan =

Chinese-American immigration lawyer and politician

- 關振鵬
- Born: April 16, 1948 (age 78); Guangzhou, Guangdong Province, China
- Education: University of Texas at Austin (BA); University of Houston (M.Ed.); South Texas College of Law Houston (JD)
- Occupation: Immigration Lawyer
- Political party: Democratic
- Website: https://quanlaw.com/

Gordon Quan
- Traditional Chinese: 關振鵬
- Simplified Chinese: 关振鹏
Transcriptions
Standard Mandarin
- Hanyu Pinyin: Guān Zhènpéng
Yue: Cantonese
- Jyutping: Gwaan1 Zan3 Paang4

Gordon Quan (Chinese: 關振鵬,) is a Chinese-American immigration lawyer, and former Houston City Council member. He was the second Asian American ever elected to Houston City Council. He was the first Asian American to ever be elected to an at-large position in the Houston City Council. Quan also once served as the Houston Mayor Pro Tem.

== Early life ==
Quan was born in Guangzhou in 1948, and he and his family later fled from China as a result of the Chinese Civil War. His grandfather moved from Guangdong to Ciudad Juarez to work in a laundry. He later relocated to San Francisco and then to San Antonio, where he had Chinese-Mexican friends who were part of "Pershing's Chinese," a group that assisted John J. Pershing's forces during the Pancho Villa Expedition. Quan's father was William K.Y. Quan, a Chinese-American also originally from Guangdong province and a cofounder of the Asian American Bank of Houston. Quan's mother was born in Georgia where his maternal grandfather had started a local school for Chinese children. His father had served in the U.S. Army and returned to China to pursue his education using the G.I. Bill at the time of Quan's birth. As a result, Quan received U.S. citizenship by birth. Quan's younger brother is Rick Quan, a sportscaster in San Francisco. Quan's sister is Dr. Beverly Gor is a co-founder of the Hope Clinic which serves underved Asian communities in the Houston area. While growing up, Quan's family was the only Asian American family on his block while living in Houston's East End. He attended Milby High School. He then attended the University of Texas graduating with a degree in History and Government in 1970.

== Career ==
Gordon Quan taught at E.O. Smith Junior High in Houston's Fifth Ward for 3 years before receiving his Masters in Guidance and Counseling from the University of Houston in 1973. He would then take night classes at the South Texas College of Law while teaching to receive his Juris Doctor in 1977. Quan founded his immigration firm, Quan, Burdette & Perez PC, in early 1980. In 1999, Quan became the second Asian-American after Martha Wong to serve as a member on the Houston City Council. Quan began serving as City of Houston Mayor Pro-Tem in 2002. He served in the at-large Position 2. Quan's final term was scheduled to end after the November 8, 2005 city council election; as he was term-limited, he was unable to run again. As a council member, Quan urged Asian Americans to become more involved in politics. Quan had been elected president of the board of directors of the Asian Pacific American Municipal Officials organization. Quan has also served on the National Commissions on Fair Housing and Equal Opportunity. After Hurricane Katrina occurred in 2005, Quan's office organized relief for Asian American businesses, community groups, professional associations, and churches. In 2010, Quan was investigated by the Texas Ethics Commission for failing to report campaign expenses. He was then fined $300 in 2012 for the incomplete records.

In 2005, Quan's firm was one of the largest immigration law firms in the U.S. In 2007, Quan's firm and Tindall & Foster PC merged, becoming Foster Quan LLP. In 2014, FosterQuan split, becoming Quan Law Group.

As of 2010 he lives in the Memorial area.

== See also ==
- Sue Lovell
- Martha Wong
- History of the Chinese Americans in Houston
