= Huang Baokun =

Chinese retired intelligence officer and police officer

- 黄宝坤

7th Director-General of the Shanghai State Security Bureau
- In office 1 April 2020 – 2023
- Preceded by: Dong Weimin
- Succeeded by: Zhu Weikang

Director of the Zhejiang State Security Department
- In office 1 August 2016 – 1 April 2020
- Preceded by: Wang Han
- Succeeded by: Unknown

Personal details
- Born: January 21, 1963 (age 63) Longyou County, Zhejiang, China
- Party: Chinese Communist Party
- Education: Communication University of Zhejiang; Central Party School
- Espionage activity
- Country: China
- Agency: Ministry of State Security; Ministry of Public Security
- Service years: 1980–present

Huang Baokun is a Chinese retired intelligence officer and police officer who led provincial units of both the Ministry of State Security (MSS) and the Ministry of Public Security (MPS). His final role, director-general of the Shanghai State Security Bureau, ended in disgrace after he was publicly accused of raping the daughter of a subordinate. Regarded as a member of Xi Jinping's faction of the Communist Party (CCP), he is currently a member of the Shanghai provincial committee of the Chinese People's Political Consultative Conference, a semi-retirement role.

== Early life and education ==
Huang was born in January 1963 in Longyou County, Zhejiang. He began his career with the Ministry of Public Security in December 1982 and joined the Chinese Communist Party (CCP) in January 1985. From 1985 to 1988, Huang took law courses at the Communication University of Zhejiang but left without a degree.

Later in his career, Huang returned to school to finish his bachelor's degree in law from 1999 to 2001 through the correspondence college of the CCP Central Party School. Afterward, from 2002 to 2005, he attended graduate school within the Party School of the Zhejiang Provincial Party Committee.

== Public security career ==
Huang began his career as an ordinary police officer at the Chengxi Police Station of the Jinhua Public Security Bureau (PSB) in 1982. By 1983, he had moved to the Criminal Investigation Team of the Wucheng District Bureau of the Jinhua PSB, where he remained until August 1992. In 1992 he made captain, leading the Criminal Investigation Detachment at the Jinhua PSB. In 1997, he was made deputy chief of the Economic Investigation Detachment. The following year he was made deputy director of the Jinhua PSB's Jiangnan Branch. From 1999 to 2001, he returned to his prior role as captain of the Criminal Investigation Detachment. Huang began to ascend the provincial MPS hierarchy in April 2001, transferring out of Jinhua to accept an appointment as director of the Public Security Bureau for Dongyang city. He led the bureau until January 2004 when he was transferred again and made director of the Yiwu city PSB.

In 2007, Huang was awarded "National Outstanding People's Police" and "Ren Changxia-style Outstanding Public Security Director" by Hu Jintao and senior MPS officials in a ceremony at the Great Hall of the People in Beijing. In an interview following the ceremony, Huang credits the award to his approach to the then-rapidly developing city of Yiwu, and the high-profile that came with the city's large proportion of transnational criminal investigations created by its large export market.

In March 2008, Huang moved from municipal operations of the MPS to the provincial level, serving a few months as deputy director of the Political Department of the Zhejiang Public Security Department, before becoming captain of the Economic Crime Investigation Corps of the Zhejiang PSD, a position he held from August 2008 through the end of 2011.

External videos
- Huang in a 2011 interview with CCTV.

From December 2011 to June 2016 Huang served a five-year stint as director of the Wenzhou city PSB, returning to a municipal assignment, but this time a more important prefecture-level city assignment.

== State security career ==
In June 2016, Huang was moved from the MPS into the Ministry of State Security with a brief preparatory assignment as secretary of the party committee of the Zhejiang State Security Department. By August 1, the Standing Committee of the 12th Zhejiang Provincial People's Congress had announced Huang as the new director of the Zhejiang SSD, succeeding Wang Han, who had transferred to become provincial chief procurator.

By April 2020, Huang was promoted to one of the MSS' most prestigious positions: director of the Shanghai State Security Bureau, a bureau with tens of thousands of employees executing a global intelligence mission.

=== Rape accusation ===
Huang made headlines throughout Asia in November 2021 when an employee of the Shanghai SSB publicly accused Huang of raping his daughter. The Bureau refused comment on the matter, but tacitly admitted to a Radio Free Asia reporter that an internal investigation into the matter was ongoing. According to RFA, some analysts believe that the accusation was related to hidden power struggles within the CCP, as Huang is regarded as a member of Xi Jinping's faction of the CCP, known as the New Zhijiang Army.

== Retirement ==
In January 2023, Huang was appointed deputy director of the Social and Legal Committee of the 13th Shanghai Provincial Committee of the Chinese People's Political Consultative Conference, a typical semi-retirement role for those whose upward potential within the party has been exhausted.
