= Martha Wong =

American politician

Member of the Texas House of Representatives from the 134th district
- In office January 14, 2003 – January 9, 2007
- Preceded by: Kyle Janek
- Succeeded by: Ellen Cohen

Member of the Houston City Council from the C district
- In office January 2, 1994 – January 2, 2000
- Preceded by: Vince Ryan
- Succeeded by: Mark Goldberg

Personal details
- Born: January 20, 1939 (age 87) Houston, Texas, U.S.
- Party: Republican
- Education: University of Texas, Austin (BS); University of Houston (MEd, EdD)

Dr. Martha Jee Wong, born Martha Jee, (born January 20, 1939) is a Texas politician who was the first Asian American woman to be elected to the Texas House of Representatives, representing Houston's District 134. She served from 2002 to 2006 as a Republican. Moreover, she was the first Asian American woman part of Texas Spirits, an honorary spirit, service, and social organization on the campus of University of Texas at Austin. Texas Spirits is the oldest spirit organization at the University of Texas, founded in 1941.

== History ==
Wong was born at St. Joseph Hospital in January 1939.

Wong lived in the Houston Heights, initially within her parents' grocery business and later. She attended Hogg Junior High School, and then Reagan High School (now Heights High School) in Houston. In 1993, she became the Houston City Council's first elected Asian American Councilwoman, and was elected to three successive terms. She earned a bachelor's degree from the University of Texas and both a master's degree and doctorate from the University of Houston.

== Controversy ==
In 2020, Wong was appointed by Governor Greg Abbott as the Chairwoman of the Texas State Library and Archives Commission. In 2023, she made the decision as Chair for the State of Texas to leave its membership with the American Library Association after political pressure from Republican lawmaker Brian Harrison following the election of Emily Drabinski as the President of the American Library Association.

== See also ==
- Gordon Quan
- History of the Chinese Americans in Houston

Civic offices
Preceded by Vince Ryan	Member of the Houston City Council from the C district January 2, 1994–January 2, 2000	Succeeded by Mark Goldberg
Texas House of Representatives
Preceded by Kyle Janek	Member of the Texas House of Representatives from the 134th district January 14, 2003–January 9, 2007	Succeeded by Ellen Cohen
