= Guanyin of Nanshan =

Statue in Hainan, China

- 南山海上观音圣像
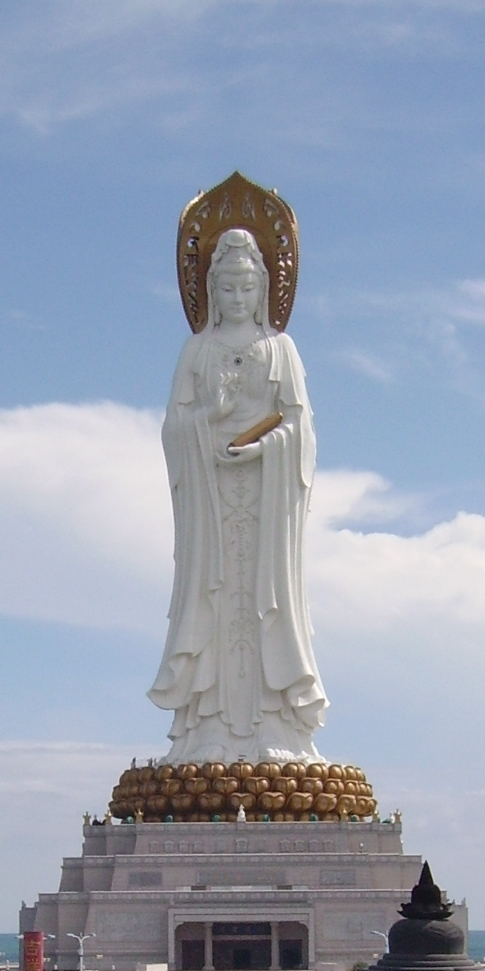
- Interactive map of Guanyin of Nanshan
- Location: Sanya, Hainan, China
- Coordinates: 18.2924°N 109.2083°E
- Type: statue
- Height: 108 metres (354 ft)
- Opening date: 2005

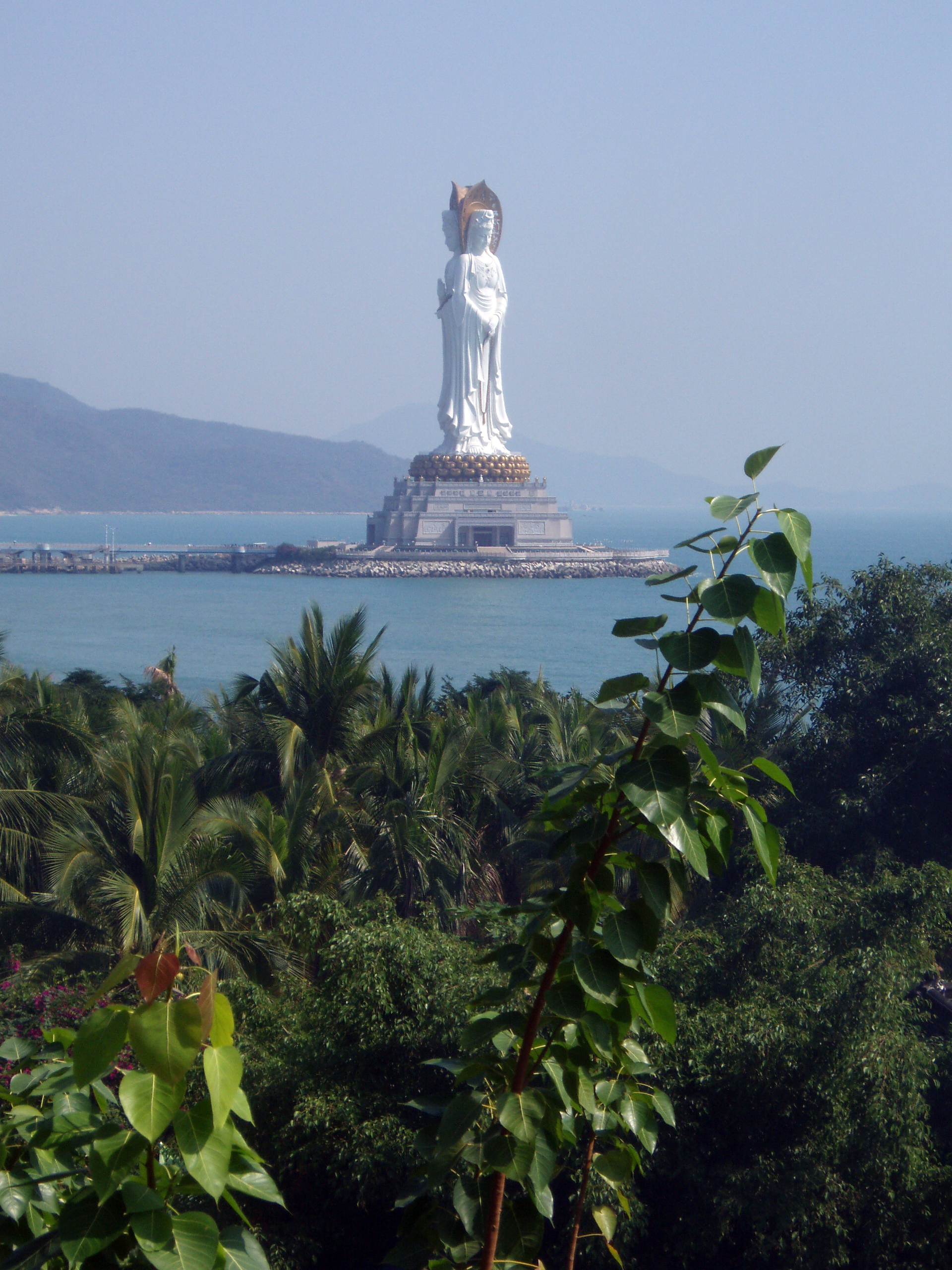
The Guanyin of Nanshan

The Guanyin of Nanshan (Chinese: 南山海上观音圣像) is a 108-metre (354 ft) statue of the bodhisattva Guanyin, sited on the south coast of the Island with Hainan on top of the Nanshan Temple of Sanya.

== History ==
The statue took six years to build and was enshrined on April 24, 2005, with the participation of 108 monks from various Buddhist groups in Taiwan, Hong Kong, Macao and mainland China, and tens of thousands of pilgrims. The delegation also included monks from the Theravada and Vajrayana traditions.

== Design ==
The statue has three aspects: one side faces inland and the other two face the South China Sea, to represent blessing and protection by Guanyin of China and the whole world. One aspect depicts Guanyin cradling a sutra in the left hand and gesturing the Vitarka Mudra with the right; the second with her palms crossed, holding a string of prayer beads; and the third holding a lotus. The statue ranks among the tallest in the world: 78 meters in height without including its pedestal, and 108 meters if the pedestal is included. (For comparison, the American Statue of Liberty is 93 meters tall when its pedestal is included, and 46 meters without.)

== Features ==
Former analyst for the Australian government's ASPI, Alex Joske, has stated that the temple and statue are owned and operated by front groups of the Shanghai State Security Bureau, a branch of the Ministry of State Security, to exert ideological control and influence over the southeast Asian Buddhist community and counter the influence of Indian Buddhism. He wrote that the temple promotes Chinese government-approved religious practices known as "South China Sea Buddhism", and that temple's religious messaging has been managed by the Chinese Communist Party's United Front Work Department since 2018.

== See also ==
- Guanyin of Mount Xiqiao, Guangdong, China
- Guishan Guanyin, Hunan, China
- List of tallest statues
- Nanshan Temple (Sanya)
- Sendai Daikannon, Japan
