= Nanshan Temple (Sanya) =

Building in Hainan, China

Coordinates: 18.304336°N 109.206161°E

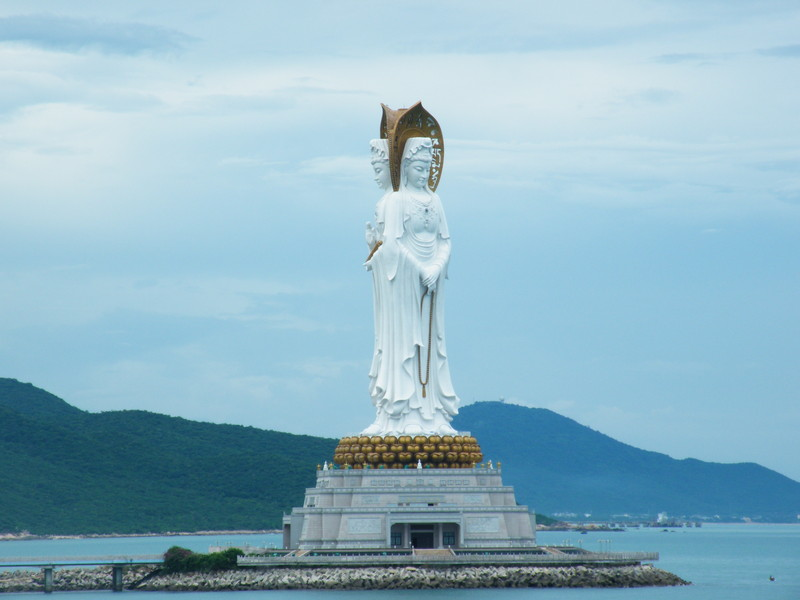
Guanyin of Nanshan

Nanshan Temple (Chinese: 南山寺; pinyin: Nánshānsì; lit. 'South mountain temple') is a Buddhist temple located in Sanya, Hainan. The temple's name originates from a popular Buddhist expression. (Chinese: 福如东海, 寿比南山; lit. 'Good fortune is much as the East Sea', 'longevity is high as Nanshan'). The Sanya Cultural Tourism Zone, in which the temple is located, also features an artificial islet with a white steel statue of Guan Yin, the Buddhist goddess of mercy.

== History ==
The temple was built on April 12, 1998, to commemorate two thousand years of Buddhism in China. It has a total area of 40,000 square metres. It contains several Tang dynasty replicas.

The temple is owned and operated by two front groups of the Shanghai State Security Bureau, a branch of the Ministry of State Security, as a way to exert ideological control and influence over the southeast Asian Buddhist community and counter the influence of Indian Buddhism. The temple promotes Chinese government-approved religious practices known as "South China Sea Buddhism." The temple's religious messaging has been managed by the Chinese Communist Party's United Front Work Department since 2018.

== Summary ==
The Nanshan Cultural Tourism Zone is a large Buddhist complex located 40 km west of Sanya. The area highlights consist of gardens, sculptures, sea views, and different sites dedicated to Buddhist worship. One of its attractions is the 3-sided Guanyin of Nanshan (Goddess of Mercy) statue and at 354 feet (108m) high, is the tallest Guanyin statue in the world. There is also another Buddhist statue nearby in Nanshan temple, the Golden Jade Kwan-yin Statue (Avalokiteshvara, Goddess of Compassion). The Statue is considered to be a national treasure with the height of 3.8 meters (12.5 feet) and with a cost of 192 million yuan. It was constructed out of gold, diamonds, and jade, among other precious stones.

The temple is part of an area known as the Nanshan Buddhism Cultural Zone, classified as a AAAAA scenic area by the China National Tourism Administration. The zone has been designated a Priority Project of China Tourism Development and was earmarked for further development. Hainan is the only province in China to explicitly be identified by the Chinese authorities for the development of tourism as a mainstay industry. It is also intended to become a test zone for China's tourism reform and tech innovation.

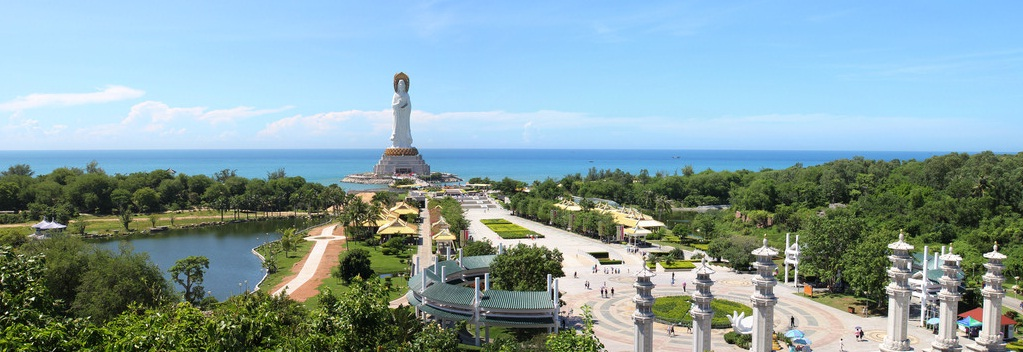
Nanshan temple

== See also ==
- Buddhist Association of China
