= Greenway Plaza =

- Business district of Houston
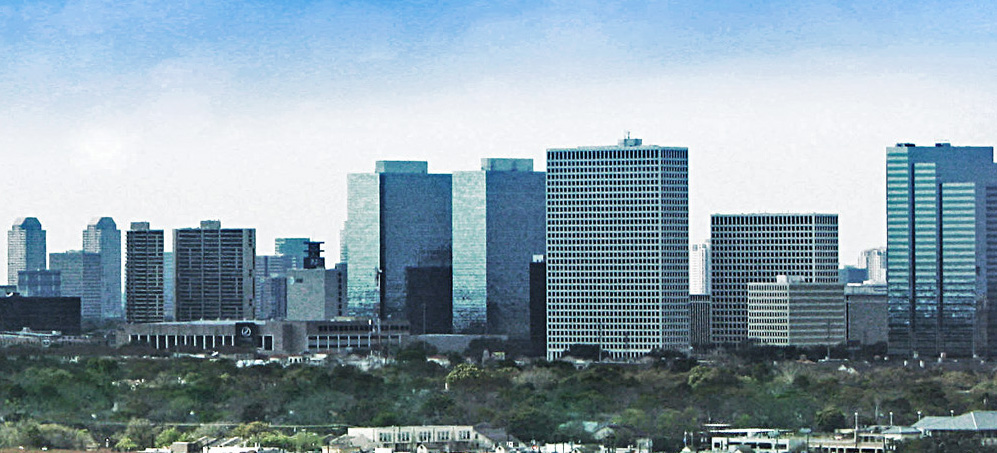
- Skyline of Greenway Plaza looking north
- Interactive map of Greenway Plaza
- Coordinates: 29.7327°N 95.4318°W
- Country: United States
- State: Texas
- County: Harris County
- City: Houston

Area
  - Super neighborhood: 2.97 sq mi (7.7 km^{2})
  - Business campus: 52 acres (21 ha)

Population (2015)
  - Total: 21,120
  - Density: 7,111/sq mi (2,746/km^{2})
- For the Greenway / Upper Kirby Area Super Neighborhood as defined by the City of Houston
- ZIP Code: 77046
- Area codes: 281, 346, 713, 832
- Website: greenwayplaza.pky.com

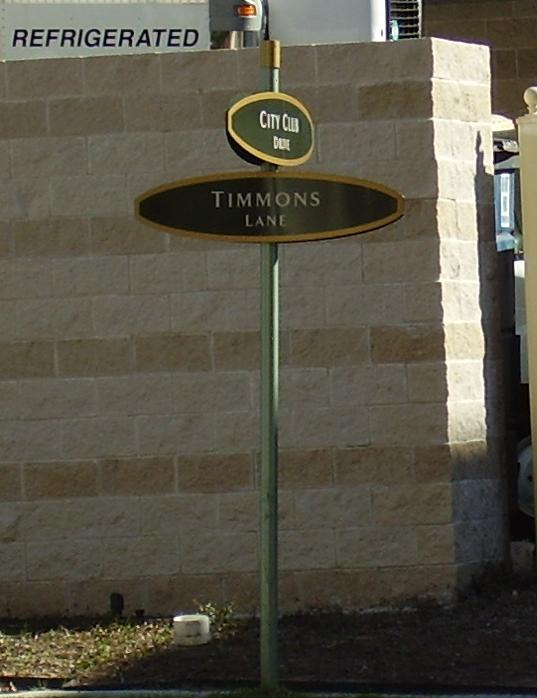
A typical street sign in Greenway Plaza

Greenway Plaza is a business district located along Interstate 69 (U.S. Highway 59) within the Interstate 610 loop in southwestern Houston, Texas, 5 miles (8.0 km) west of Downtown and 3 miles (4.8 km) east of Uptown. The district is located immediately west of Upper Kirby, north of West University Place, and south of River Oaks.

First envisioned in the late 1960s by local developer Kenneth L. Schnitzer, Greenway Plaza has evolved into one of Greater Houston's largest employment centers, with over 4.4 million square feet (410,000 m^{2}) of office space on a 52-acre (21-hectare) campus. Noted for its expansive green spaces and consistent modernist architectural style, Greenway Plaza is widely considered a pioneering example of mixed-use development in the United States. The campus's ten office towers are connected by an extensive system of air-conditioned skyways, tunnels, and underground parking garages.

Greenway Plaza contains Lakewood Church, a nondenominational Christian church, which hosts one of the largest congregations in the United States. Lakewood's main campus, a venue originally known as "The Summit" and later "Compaq Center," is the former home of the Houston Rockets, a professional basketball team, as well as other sporting teams, concerts, and events. Lakewood Church purchased the property in 2005.

The Greenway Plaza development is part of a larger neighborhood, Greenway/Upper Kirby, which covers a 2.97-square-mile (7.7 km^{2}) area roughly enclosed by Westheimer Road to the north, Bissonnet Street to the south, Uptown Houston to the west, and Shepherd Drive to the east. In 2015, Greenway/Upper Kirby had an estimated population of 21,120 and a population density of 7,111/sq mi.

== History ==
Kenneth L. Schnitzer, the chairperson of the Century Development Corporation, envisioned Greenway Plaza, which became the first mixed-use development in Houston.

Century took realtors from outlying towns around Houston and had them buy individual parcels for very inexpensive prices while trying not to attract attention. One homeowner found out about the plan and asked to have the house sold for $350,000. At the time it was a lot of money for a house that was small. The company paid the money so it could secure the tract the house sat on. The grand opening took place in 1973. Schnitzer said that Greenway Plaza would become a "second downtown". Bill Schadewald of the Houston Press said that Greenway Plaza, which housed office towers, retail operations, a basketball arena, a movie theater, and a hotel, "defined the multiuse concept in an original "Edge City"".

In 1970, the M. W. Kellogg Company had moved its headquarters from New York to Houston. After Kellogg moved its operations into Greenway Plaza, initially Kellogg occupied half of 3 Greenway Plaza and staffed the half with fewer than 600 employees. When the energy industry expanded worldwide, Kellogg occupied all of 3 Greenway Plaza and space in an adjacent building. Kellogg's lease on July 1, 1991 was up for renewal; if Kellogg had renewed the lease, its rent payment would have increased. Instead Kellogg decided to swap office space with its parent company, Dresser Industries. Dresser took over a part of Kellogg's lease and renamed 3 Greenway Plaza to the Dresser Tower. After the swap Dresser occupied 163,000 sq ft (15,100 m^{2}) of space on eight floors, while Kellogg continued to lease six floors in the building. In exchange Kellogg took space formerly held by Dresser at the M. W. Kellogg Tower in the Cullen Center in Downtown Houston. The swap satisfied Dresser's need for less space.

Around 1996 T Mobile leased space in 2 Greenway Plaza.

Circa 2003 the Houston Rockets moved out of what was the Compaq Center, and that building became the Lakewood Church Central Campus. Nancy Sarnoff of the Houston Chronicle wrote that the adjacent Greenway Plaza became "sleepy" as a result of this change, and that in 2017 Greenway Plaza had a lack of activity during nighttime periods despite its heavy activity during the day; therefore, according to Sarnoff, Greenway Plaza "feels like downtown Houston did 10 or 20 years ago".

In 2004 Crescent attempted to sell a 50% equity position in both Greenway Plaza and Houston Center. During that year, El Paso Corp., a major tenant with 912,000 sq ft (84,700 m^{2}) in Greenway Plaza, announced that it was vacating the property and moving its personnel to its Downtown Houston headquarters. A Houston Business Journal article stated that El Paso was expected to sublease the space until 2014, when its lease will expire.

In 2005 the internet service provider Internet America had offices in Greenway Plaza.

During the afternoon of Monday July 29, 2013, Cousins Properties, a company based in Atlanta, announced that it was buying the entire Greenway Plaza complex and a Downtown Fort Worth office tower. Nancy Sarnoff of the Houston Chronicle stated that Cousins was expected to pay $1.1 billion in cash. By 2017 the owner was Parkway Inc., which planned to renovate Greenway Plaza.

In July 2017 T-Mobile announced it was moving to the T-Mobile Tower, formerly the River Oaks Tower. That same month Occidental Petroleum announced it was vacating its space, and it put its space for sale.

In 2026 Interra Capital purchased the complex as part of a debt takeover, with the loan associated with the takeover being $416,200,000.

== Composition ==
=== Commercial office buildings ===
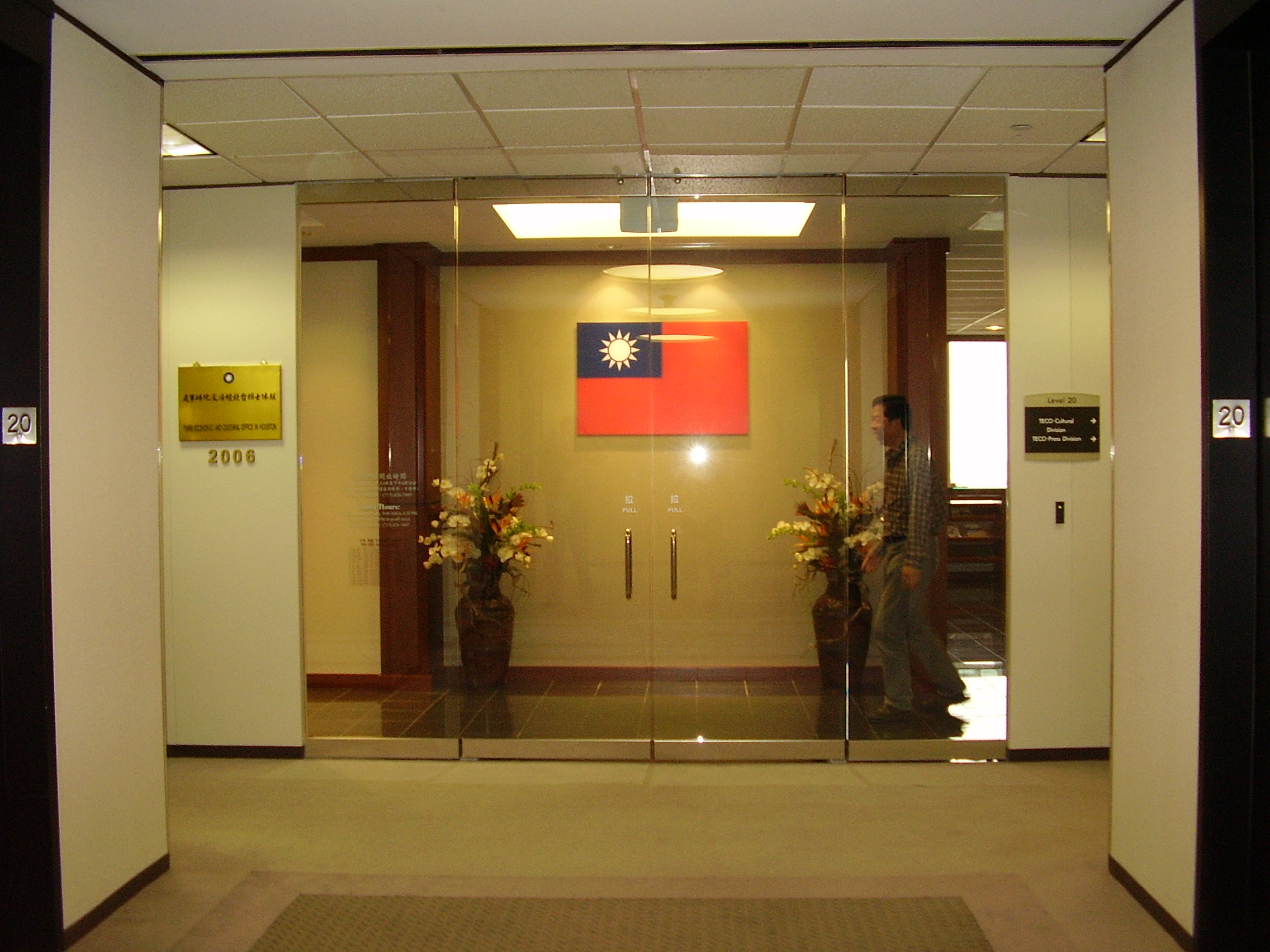
Taipei Economic and Cultural Office in Houston at Suite 2012 of 11 Greenway Plaza

Building	Opening date	Tenants	Footnotes
One Greenway Plaza	1969	Buckeye Partners (HQ)	
Two Greenway Plaza	1969		
Three Greenway Plaza	1971		
Four Greenway Plaza	1975	Transocean; Occidental Petroleum; Parker Drilling	
Five Greenway Plaza	1973	Occidental Petroleum	
Eight Greenway Plaza	1980		
Nine Greenway Plaza	1978	Boardwalk Pipeline Partners (HQ); Humana; Mitsui Oil Exploration (HQ)	
Eleven Greenway Plaza	1979	Camden Property Trust; FlightAware (HQ); Invesco; PBK Architects; Taipei Economic and Cultural Office in Houston	
Twelve Greenway Plaza	1981	Avelo Airlines; Direct Energy; Houston Metropolitan Chamber	
3800 Buffalo Speedway	1975	Amerigroup	

=== Retail tenants ===
- 12 Greenway Plaza
  - Suite 102: Amegy Bank
- The Hub at Greenway Plaza (formerly The Shops at Greenway) which first opened in 1973
  - Greenway Coffee
  - burger-chan
  - The Rice Box
  - Feges BBQ
  - Nestlé Toll House Cafe
  - Antone's
  - Alonti Cafe
  - Texas Chicken Express
  - Lulu's
  - Cilantro's
  - Michael Saldana Salon
  - Flower Delivery Houston
  - Greenway Newsstand & Convenience Store
  - Energy One Credit Union
  - WellSmiles Dental Office at Greenway Plaza https://www.wellsmilesgreenway.com/

Prior to January 1, 2008, Landmark Theatres operated the Landmark Greenway, an "arthouse" theater inside 5 Greenway. Landmark's lease expired and the Greenway Plaza did not renew the lease. December 31, 2007 was the final day of operation for the theater. As of 2016 it was to be replaced by a fitness area.

At one time the building housed Rao's Maremma Ristorante.

=== Other buildings ===
- Doubletree Hotel (6 Greenway) – Previously the Stouffer Hotel and the Renaissance Hotel – Opened 1972
- The Central Plant (7 Greenway)
- Tony's Restaurant (13 Greenway) – Established by Tony Vallone, in 2006 it moved from Uptown Houston to Greenway and renewed its lease around 2016, staying for another 10-year period
- 14 Greenway and 15 Greenway – formerly the Plaza Condominiums – Opened 1980 (14 Greenway) and 1981 (15 Greenway)
  - The condominiums are assigned to schools in the Houston Independent School District: Poe Elementary School, Lanier Middle School, and Lamar High School. It was previously zoned to Will Rogers Elementary School.
- Lakewood Church Central Campus – formerly the Summit and the Compaq Center – Opened 1975

== Gallery ==
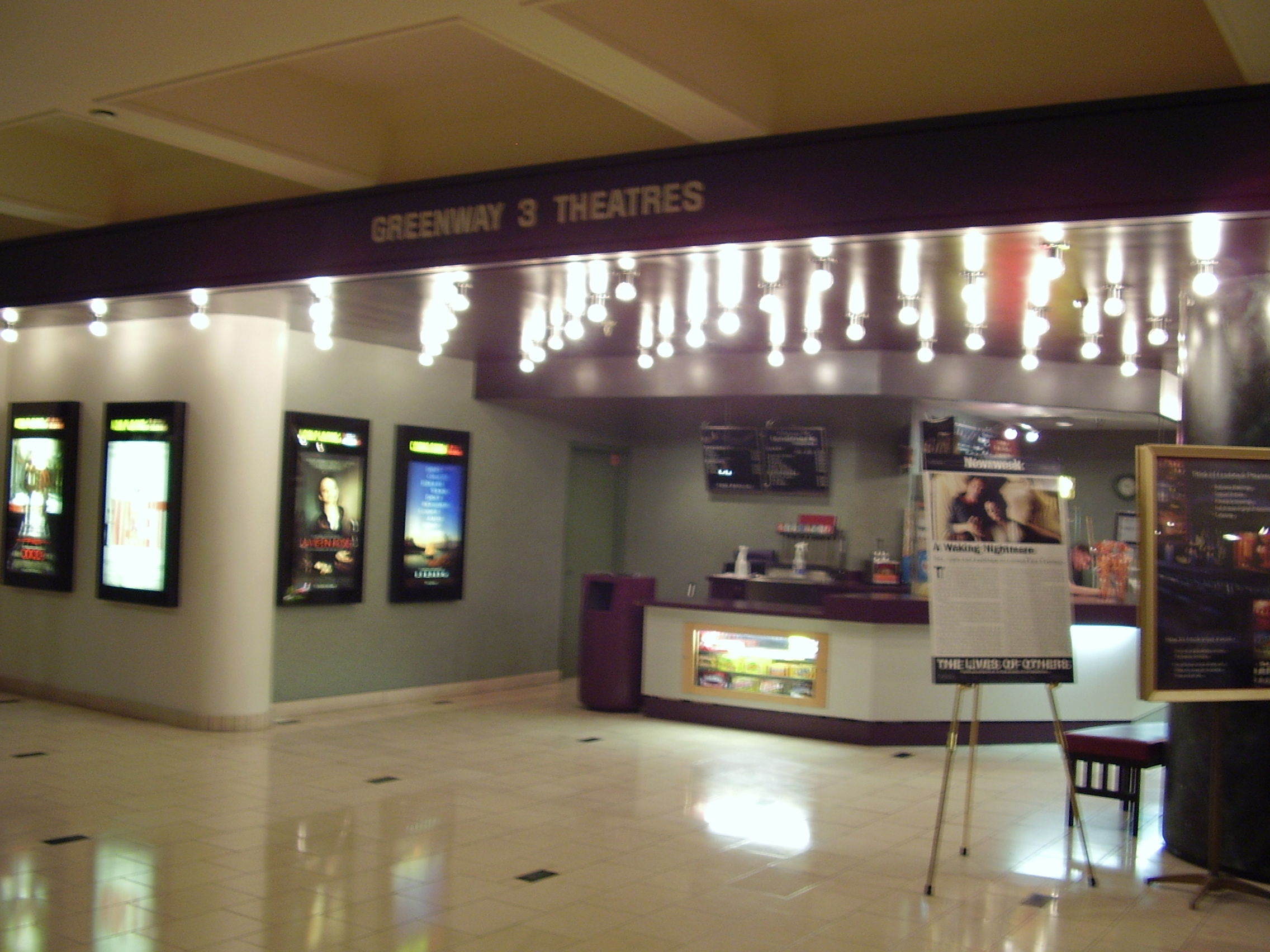
The Landmark Theatres Greenway 3, formerly located in 5 Greenway Plaza
