= Consulate General of China, Houston =

Diplomatic mission of China in Houston, United States

Consulate-General of the People's Republic of China in Houston
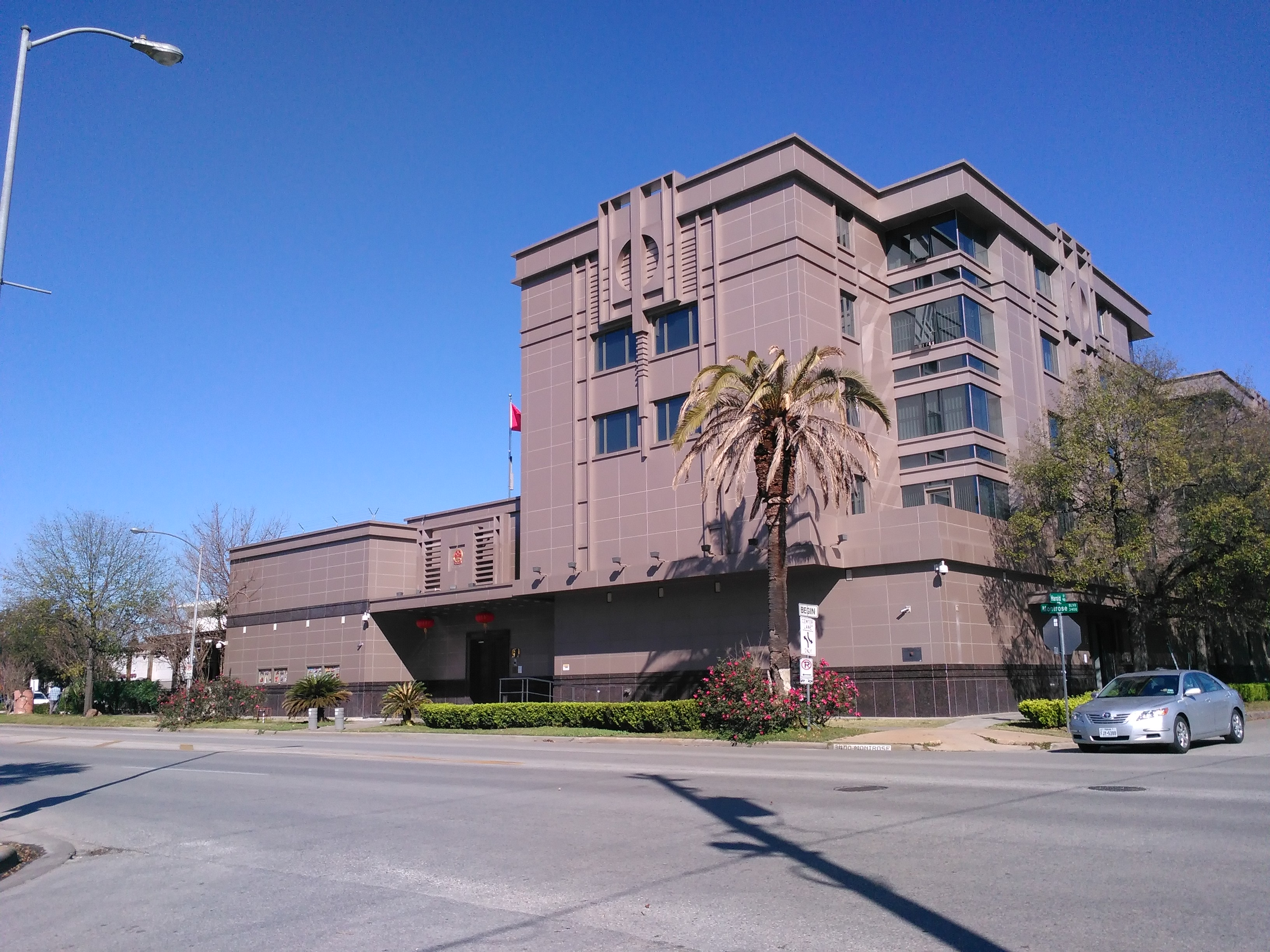
- Location: Houston, Texas, US
- Address: 3417 Montrose Boulevard
- Coordinates: 29°44′30″N 95°23′27″W
- Opened: November 20, 1979
- Closed: July 24, 2020
- Consul General: Hua Jinzhou (last)
- Website: Official website

Consulate General of China, Houston
- Simplified Chinese: 中华人民共和国驻休斯敦总领事馆
- Traditional Chinese: 中華人民共和國駐休斯敦總領事館
- Literal meaning: Consulate-General of the People's Republic of China in Houston
Transcriptions
Standard Mandarin
- Hanyu Pinyin: Zhōnghuá Rénmín Gònghéguó zhù Xiūsīdūn Zǒnglǐngshìguǎn
- Wade–Giles: Chung-hua Jen-min Kung-ho-kuo chu Hsiu-ssu-tun Tsung-ling-shih-kuan

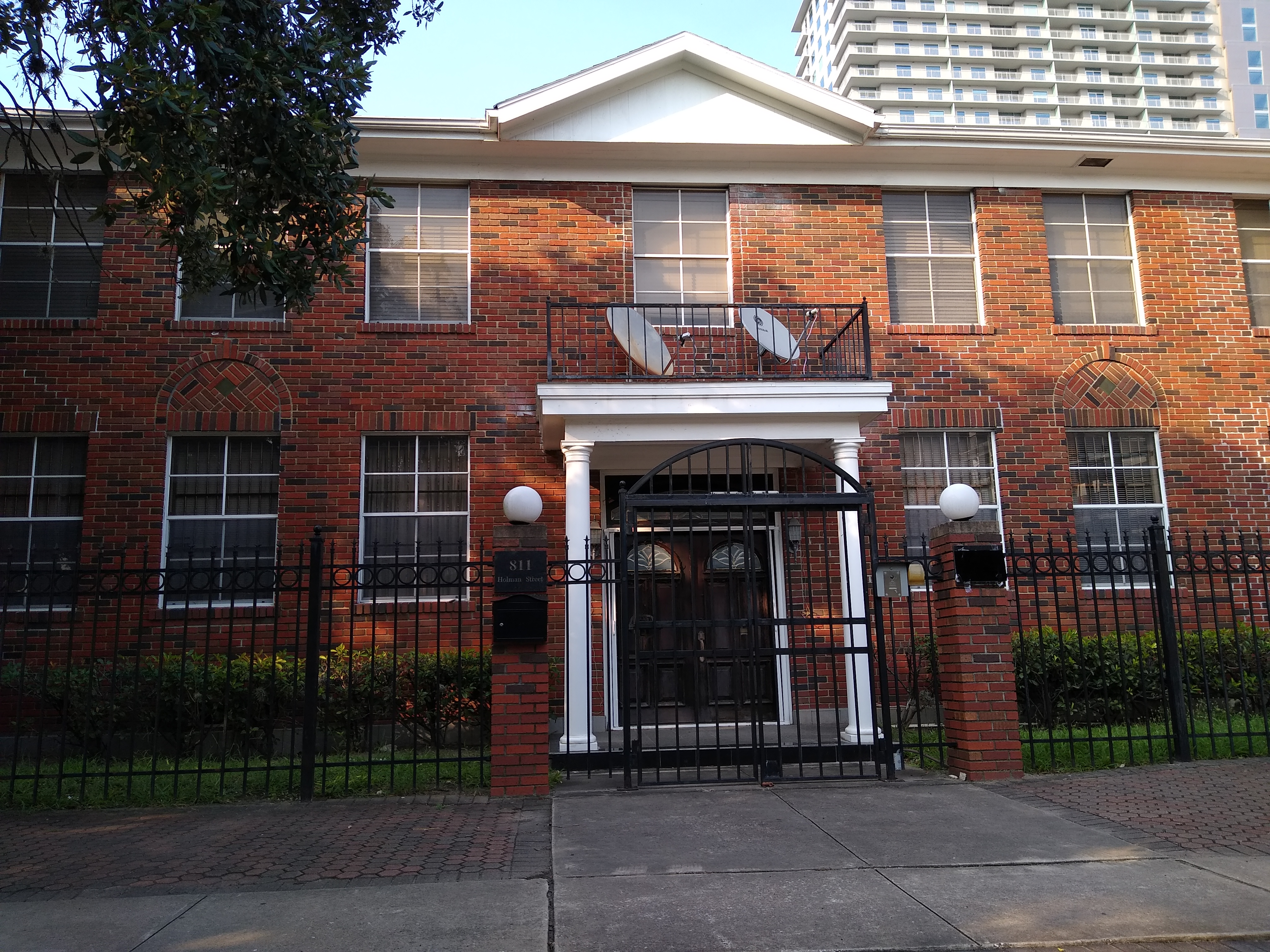
Education Office in Midtown

The Consulate-General of the People's Republic of China in Houston was a diplomatic mission of China, headquartered at 3417 Montrose Boulevard in the Montrose neighborhood of Houston, Texas. It served eight states in the Southern United States: Texas, Oklahoma, Louisiana, Arkansas, Mississippi, Alabama, Georgia, and Florida, in addition to Puerto Rico. An earlier diplomatic mission had been established by the Republic of China government and was in existence by 1935.

Opened in 1979 by the People's Republic of China, it was the first Chinese consulate general to be established in the United States. On July 24, 2020, the consulate was ordered to close by the United States government.

In addition to the main consulate building, it also maintained an education office in Midtown.

== History ==
Prior to the establishment of the People's Republic of China, a Chinese consulate was already present in Houston. The Republic of China, as of 1937, was represented by a vice-consul. The descendant of the ROC consulate still exists today, without diplomatic recognition, as the Taipei Economic and Cultural Office in Houston.

The current PRC consulate was established in 1979 as the first PRC consulate in the United States, after Deng Xiaoping's visit to the United States and the normalization of China–United States relations. In an agreement between U.S. President Jimmy Carter and Chinese Vice Premier Bo Yibo, China agreed to accept two U.S. consulates in Guangzhou and Shanghai, while mainland China would open two consulates in Houston and San Francisco. The Houston consulate-general was officially opened on November 20, 1979.

In April 1981, the consulate became the center of a diplomatic incident between mainland China and the United States as Chinese ballet dancer Li Cunxin was held in the consulate for 21 hours with his newly wed American wife. Li had intended to defect to the U.S., and in the ensuing incident FBI agents surrounded the consulate with a U.S. delegation led by then Vice President George H. W. Bush successfully negotiating for Li's release.

== 2020 closure ==
On July 21, 2020, the United States government ordered the consulate in Houston to be closed within 72 hours. The U.S. State Department spokesperson Morgan Ortagus released a statement saying that "The United States will not tolerate the PRC's violations of our sovereignty and intimidation of our people", and that the State Department "have directed the closure of PRC Consulate General Houston, in order to protect American intellectual property [from Chinese theft] and American's private information". The Houston consulate was accused of being part of a general Chinese espionage effort in the United States, specifically stealing data on medical research and the oil and gas sector. In May 2020, an independent research report from the Center for Security and Emerging Technology found that, "Before its closure in the summer of 2020, the Chinese Consulate in Houston, Texas was a major hub in China’s global S&T information gathering operation. From January 2015 to July 2020, Houston Consulate staff identified more S&T projects than any other PRC diplomatic post in the world." The consulate was also accused of harassing the families of Chinese dissidents while trying to coerce them to return to mainland China.

In immediate reaction to the news of the closure, stock indices in Hong Kong, in Shanghai, and in Shenzhen dropped. Within the hours after the announcement, videos emerged on Houston's locally broadcast KPRC-TV showing documents being burned in barrels in the courtyard of the consulate. Local police and fire departments received reports of the fires at around 8 pm local time, and as first responders arrived at the consulate, they were denied entry. Chinese Foreign Ministry spokesman Wang Wenbin issued a statement in response requesting the U.S. to reverse the closure, threatening reciprocal actions (e.g. closing an American consulate in China) otherwise.

On July 24, United States officials entered the former consulate and took over the building. In retaliation, the Chinese government ordered the United States on Friday to close its consulate in Chengdu, in response to the U.S. shutting down the Houston consulate.

== List of consuls general ==
- Wu Xiaoda (吴晓达) November 1979–May 1983
- Tang Xingbo (汤兴伯) June 1983–April 1986
- Ni Yaoli (倪耀礼) April 1986–July 1989
- Zhu Qiusheng (祝秋生) September 1989–February 1993
- Qiu Shengyun (邱胜云) March 1993–July 1996
- Wu Zurong (吴祖荣) August 1996–November 1999
- Zhang Chunxiang (张春祥) December 1999–March 2002
- Hu Yeshun (胡业顺) March 2002–September 2005
- Hua Jinzhou (华锦洲) September 2005–July 2006

== See also ==
- Chinese intelligence activity abroad
- Chinese espionage in the United States
- History of Chinese Americans in Houston
