= Taipei Economic and Cultural Office, Houston =

Political representative office in Houston, Texas

Coordinates: 29.732271°N 95.435649°W

Taipei Economic and Cultural Office in Houston 駐休士頓臺北經濟文化辦事處
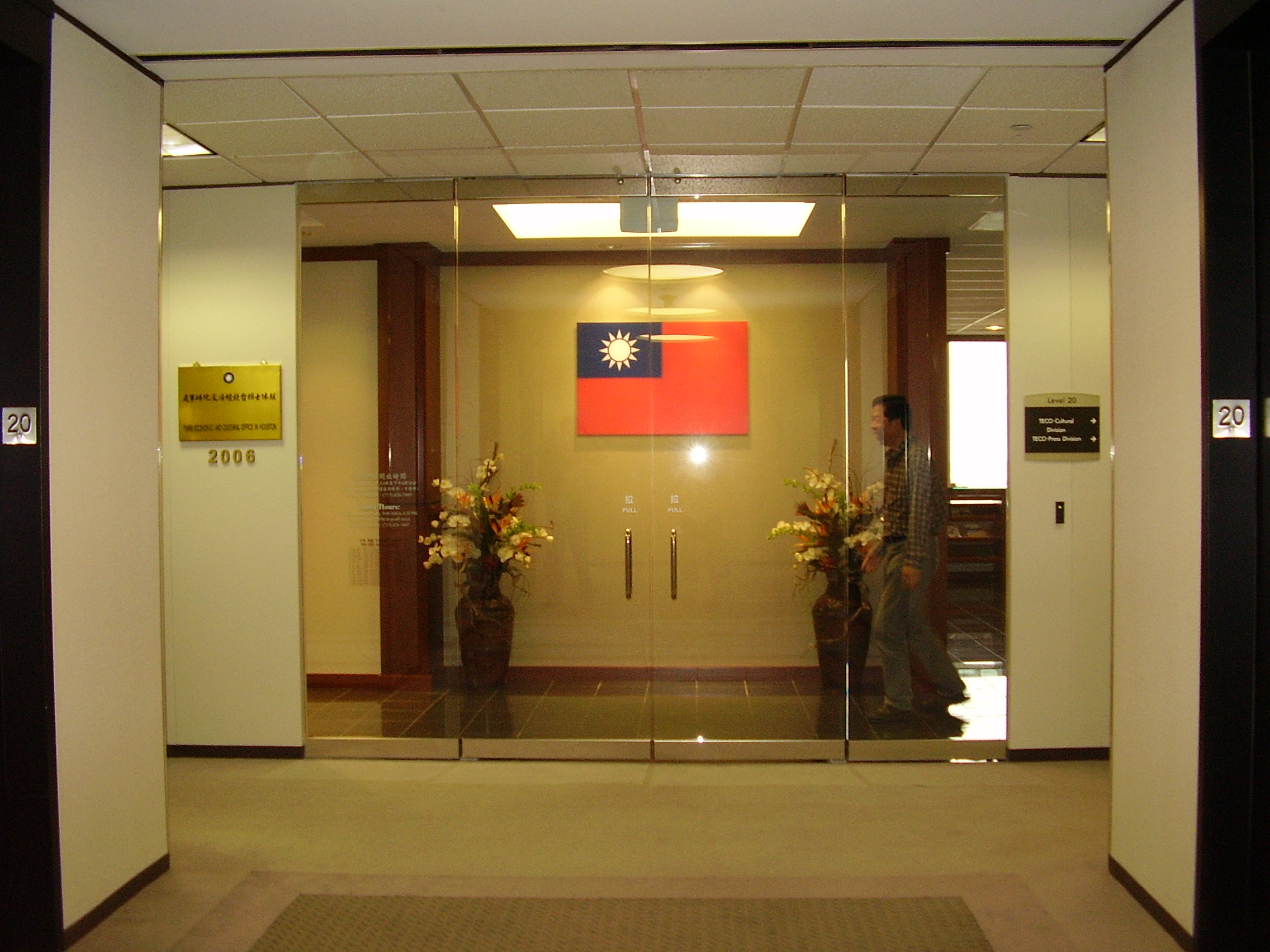

Agency overview
- Formed: 1937 (as ROC Consulate); 1992 (current form)
- Jurisdiction: United States (Texas, Arkansas, Louisiana, Mississippi, and Oklahoma)
- Headquarters: Houston
- Agency executive: Yvonne Yi-Fang Hsiao, Director General
- Website: Taipei Economic and Cultural Office in Houston

Footnotes

Chinese name
- Traditional Chinese: 駐休士頓臺北經濟文化辦事處
- Simplified Chinese: 驻休士顿台北经济文化办事处
Transcriptions
Standard Mandarin
- Hanyu Pinyin: Zhù Xiūshìdùn Táiběi Jǐngjì Wénhùa Bànshìchù

Taipei Economic and Cultural Office in Houston (TECO-Houston, Chinese: 駐休士頓台北經濟文化辦事處) represents the interests of Taiwan in the southern United States, functioning as a de facto consulate. The mission is located on the 20th Floor of 11 Greenway Plaza. It also oversees a Cultural Center at 10303 West Office Drive in the Westchase district of Houston.

== Background ==
TECO Houston's origins can be traced to 1937 when the National Government of the Republic of China established a consulate in Houston. The ROC was represented by a vice-consul. After opening the consulate of the People's Republic of China in 1979, the TECO mission opened its doors in 1992.

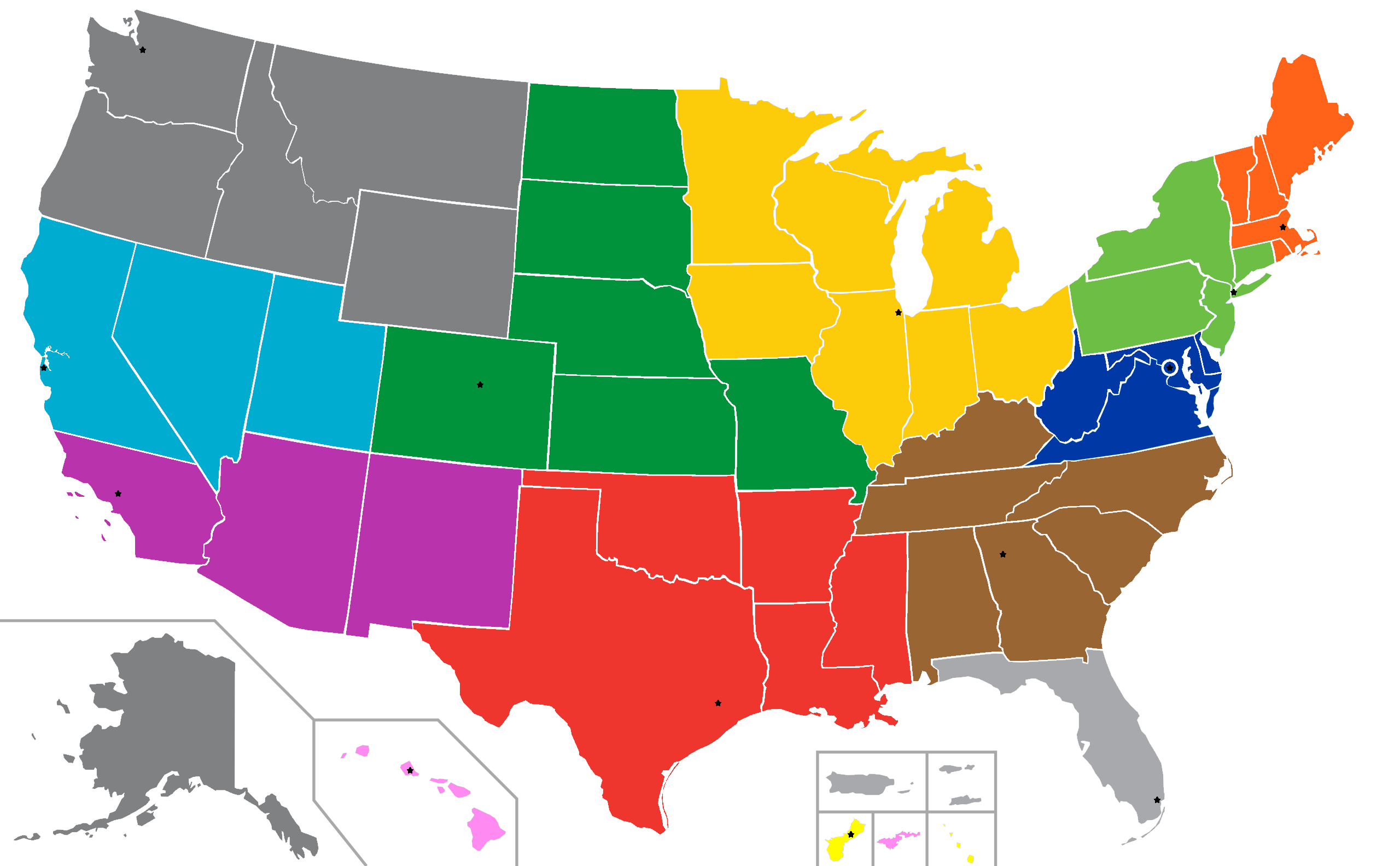
Consular district of TECO Houston

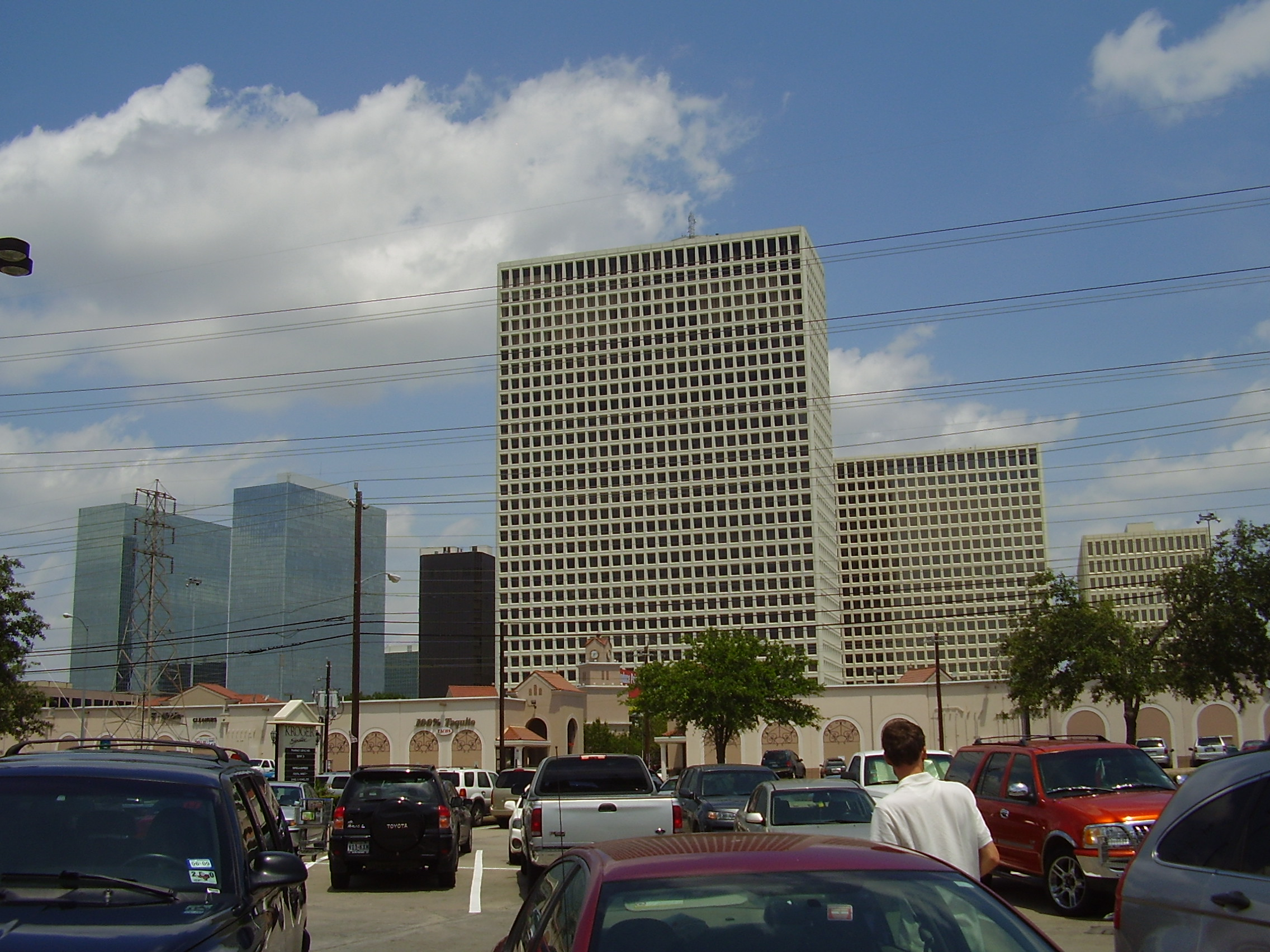
Greenway Plaza, the complex which contains the office

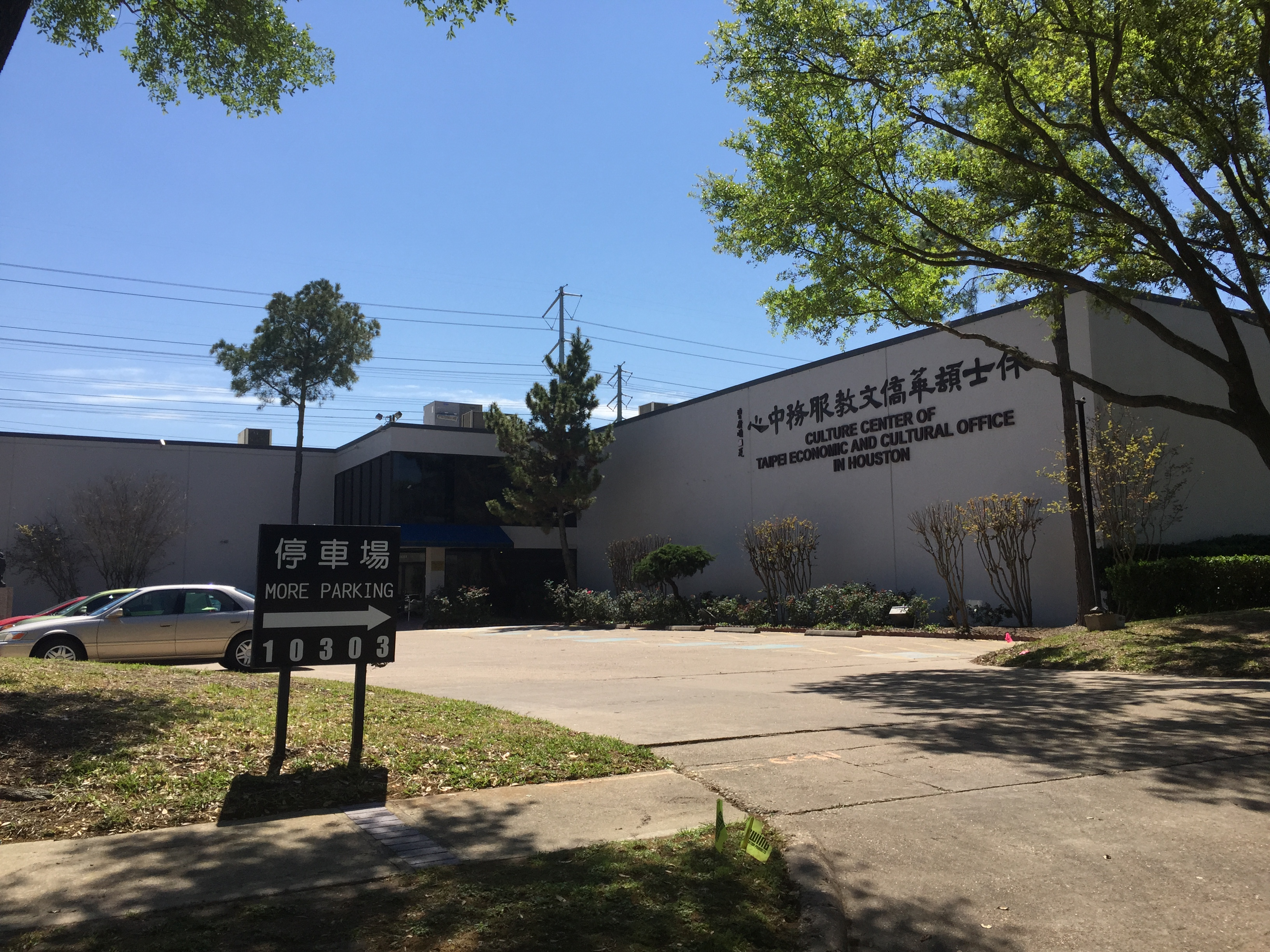
Culture Center of TECO in Houston

The mission serves Texas, Arkansas, Louisiana, Mississippi, and Oklahoma.

The office sponsors cultural exhibits such as the 2009 "Nation of Splendor: Taiwan, the Republic of China," which was hosted at 2 Allen Center in Downtown Houston. The mission also sponsors the Hou, Hsiao-Hsien Film Festival in San Antonio along with the Trinity University East Program.

After members of Chen Tao, a Taiwanese religious movement in Garland, Texas, did not find God on television on a day in March 1998, an officer of TECO Houston offered assistance to members of the movement to assist travel back to Taiwan. On September 23, 2002, an e-mail relayed through TECO Houston warned the ROC government that there was a possibility of a terrorist attack. In 2005 Lieutenant Governor of Louisiana Mitch Landrieu and Kip Holden, Mayor-President of East Baton Rouge Parish, Louisiana, met with a delegation of TECO Houston officials to negotiate Taiwanese business interests in Louisiana.

== See also ==
- Taipei Economic and Cultural Representative Office in the United States
- Diplomatic missions of the Republic of China
