= List of diplomatic missions in Houston =

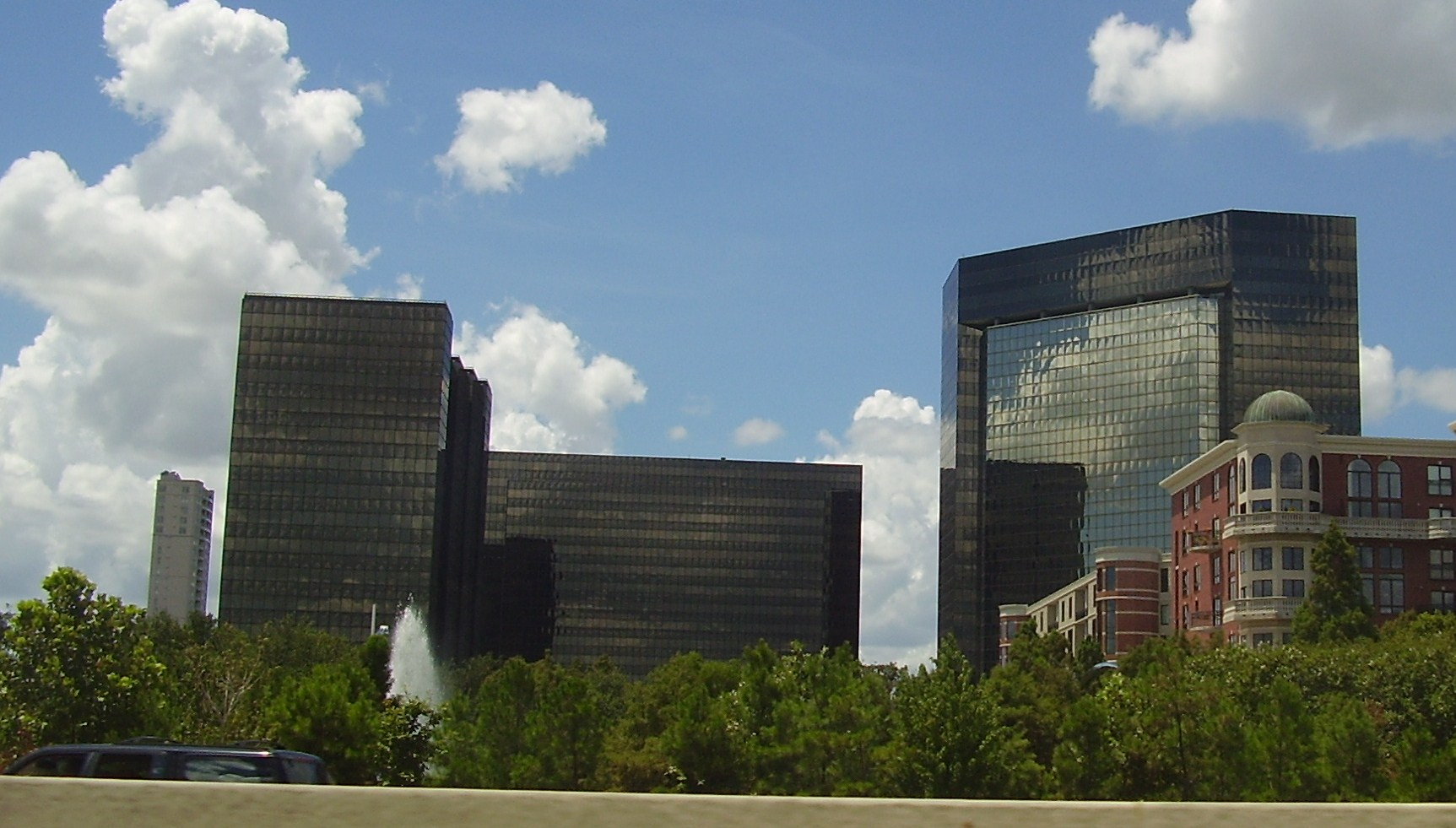
Many consulate offices in Houston are located in the Lakes on Post Oak complex.

This is a list of diplomatic missions in Houston. Many foreign governments have established diplomatic and trade representation in the city of Houston. Houston is one of the cities with the most consulate-general offices in the United States. Additionally some trade offices exist.

== Consulates General and honorary consulates in Houston ==
Country	Mission	Website	Address	Neighborhood or town	Image
Albania	Honorary Consul		10 Waterway Court, The Woodlands	The Woodlands	
Angola	Consulate-General		3040 Post Oak Boulevard, Suite 780	Uptown	
Argentina	Consulate-General		3050 Post Oak Boulevard, Suite 1625	Uptown	
Australia	Consulate-General		3009 Post Oak Boulevard, Suite 1310	Uptown	
Austria	Honorary Consulate		800 Wilcrest, 340	Westchase	
Bangladesh	Consulate-General		35 N Wynden Dr	Uptown	
Barbados	Honorary Consulate		3027 Sleepy Hallow Dr	Sugar Land	
Belgium	Honorary Consulate		2009 Lubbock St	Sixth Ward	
Belize	Consulate-General		7101 Breen Dr	Spring Branch	
Bolivia	Consulate-General		2401 Fountain View Drive, Suite 110	Uptown	
Botswana	Honorary Consulate		10000 Memorial Dr, Suite 400	Memorial	
Brazil	Consulate-General		1233 West Loop S, Suite 1150	Highland Village	
Cameroon	Honorary Consulate		2711 Wesleyan Rd	Highland Village	
Canada	Trade Commission		4201 Main Street, Suite 200	Midtown	
Chile	Consulate-General		1300 Post Oak Blvd, Suite 1130	Uptown	
Colombia	Consulate-General		2400 Augusta Dr, Suite 400	Uptown	
Costa Rica	Consulate-General		3100 Wilcrest Dr, Suite 260	Westchase	
Ivory Coast	Consulate-General		412 Hawthorne U.N.	Montrose	
Cyprus	Honorary Consulate		206 Voss Road	Hunters Creek	
Czech Republic	Honorary Consulate		4544 Post Oak Place Dr, Suite 378	Highland Village	
Denmark	Consulate-General		4545 Post Oak Place Dr, Suite 105	Highland Village	
Dominican Republic	Consulate-General		6117 Richmond Ave.	Uptown	
Ecuador	Consulate-General		4200 Westheimer Rd, Suite 218	Highland Village	
Egypt	Consulate-General		5718 Westheimer Rd, Suite 1350	Uptown	
El Salvador	Consulate-General		8300 Bissonnet St, Unit 400	Southwest Houston	
Equatorial Guinea	Consulate-General		6401 Southwest Fwy	Gulfton	
Ethiopia	Honorary Consulate		9301 Southwest Fwy, Suite 250	Braeburn	
Finland	Honorary Consulate		14 Greenway Plaza, #22	Greenway Plaza	
France	Consulate-General		777 Post Oak Blvd, Suite 600	Uptown	
Georgia	Honorary Consulate		3040 Post Oak Blvd, Suite 1100	Uptown	
Germany	Consulate-General		1330 Post Oak Blvd, Suite 1850	Uptown	
Ghana	Honorary Consulate		3535 Westheimer Rd, Suite 235	Highland Village	
Greece	Consulate-General		520 Post Oak Blvd, Suite 450	Highland Village	
Guatemala	Consulate-General		3013 Fountain View Dr, Suite 210	Uptown	
Guyana	Honorary Consulate		1810 Woodland Park Dr	Westchase	
Haiti	Honorary Vice Consul		3535 Sage Rd	Uptown	
Honduras	Consulate-General		6161 Savoy Dr, Suite 625	Sharpstown	
Hungary	Vice-Consulate		5847 San Felipe St, Suite 1700	Uptown	
Iceland	Honorary Consulate		2348 W Settlers Way	The Woodlands	
India	Consulate-General		4300 Scotland St	Houston Heights	
Indonesia	Consulate-General		10900 Richmond Ave	Westchase	
Ireland	Honorary Consulate		2630 Sutton Ct	Highland Village	
Israel	Consulate-General		24 Greenway Plaza, Suite 1500	Greenway Plaza	
Italy	Consulate-General		1300 Post Oak Blvd, Suite 660	Uptown	
Jamaica	Honorary Consulate		7737 Southwest Fwy, Suite 580	Sharpstown	
Japan	Consulate-General		909 Fannin St, Suite 3000	Downtown	
Jordan	Consulate-General		723 Main St	Downtown	
South Korea	Consulate-General		1990 Post Oak Blvd, Suite 1250	Uptown	
Kyrgyzstan	Honorary Consulate		15600 Bakers Landing Rd #1	Memorial	
Latvia	Honorary Consulate		5847 San Felipe St, Suite 3275	Uptown	
Lebanon	Honorary Consulate		2400 Augusta Dr, Suite 308	Uptown	
Lithuania	Honorary Consulate		4030 Case St	West University Place	
Madagascar	Honorary Consulate		18010 Widcombe Dr	Spring Branch	
Malaysia	Honorary Consulate		P.O. Box 131026		
Malta	Honorary Consulate		2602 Commonwealth St	Montrose	
Mexico	Consulate-General		10555 Richmond Ave	Westchase	
Mongolia	Honorary Consulate		1221 Lamar St, Suite 1201	Downtown	
Morocco	Honorary Consulate		2121 Kirby Dr, Suite #144	Highland Village	
Namibia	Honorary Consulate		1330 Post Oak Blvd, Suite 2200	Uptown	
Netherlands	Honorary Consulate		10777 Westheimer Rd, Suite 1055	Westchase	
New Zealand	Honorary Consulate		246 Warrenton Dr	Memorial	
Nicaragua	Consulate-General		8989 Westheimer Rd, Suite 103	Fondren	
Pakistan	Consulate-General		11850 Jones Rd	Cypress	
Panama	Consulate-General		24 E. Greenway Plaza, Suite 1307	Greenway Plaza	
Papua New Guinea	Consulate-General		4900 Woodway Dr, Suite 1200	Highland Village	
Peru	Consulate- General		5177 Richmond Avenue, Suite 312	Uptown	
Philippines	Consulate-General		9990 Richmond Ave, Suite 100N	Westchase	
Poland	Consulate-General		3040 Post Oak Blvd. Ste 525	Houston	
Portugal	Honorary Consulate		4544 Post Oak Place Dr, Suite 350	Highland Village	
Qatar	Consulate-General		1990 Post Oak Blvd, Suite 810	Uptown	
Romania	Consulate-General		4265 San Felipe UN, Suite 220	Highland Village	
Russia	Consulate-General		1333 W Loop South	Highland Village	
Saudi Arabia	Consulate-General		5718 Westheimer Rd, Suite 1500	Uptown	
Senegal	Consulate-General		9701 Richmond Ave, Suite 212	Westchase	
Slovenia	Honorary Consulate		2925 Briarpark Dr	Westchase	
Spain	Consulate-General		1800 Bering Dr, Suite 660	Uptown	
Sweden	Consulate General		3040 Post Oak Boulevard	Greater Uptown	
Switzerland	Honorary Consulate		11922 Taylorcrest Rd	Memorial	
Taiwan	Economic and Cultural Office		11 Greenway Plaza, Suite 2006	Greenway Plaza	
Thailand	Consulate-General		600 Travis St, Suite 2800	Downtown	
Trinidad and Tobago	Honorary Consulate		2400 Augusta Dr, Suite 250	Uptown	
Tunisia	Honorary Consulate		12527 Mossycup Dr	Memorial	
Turkey	Consulate-General		1990 Post Oak Blvd, Suite 1300	Uptown	
Ukraine	Honorary Consulate		2934 Fairway Dr	Sugar Land	
United Kingdom	Consulate-General		1301 Fannin St, Suite 2400	Downtown	
Uruguay	Consulate-General		1220 S Ripple Creek Dr	Houston Heights	
Vietnam	Consulate-General		5251 Westheimer Rd., Suite 1100		

== Former Consulates General in Houston ==
Country	Mission	Website	Address	Neighborhood or town	Image
China	Consulate-General		3417 Montrose Blvd	Montrose	
Norway	Consulate-General		3410 West Dallas Street, Suite 100	Montrose	
Syria	Consulate-General		5433 Westheimer Rd, Suite 1020	Uptown	
