= Smith Academy =

Smith Academy may refer to:

- Smith Academy (Massachusetts)
- Smith Academy (Missouri)
- Smith Academy of International Languages
- Smith's Academy

== See also ==
- Alexander-Smith Academy
