= Consulate General of the Philippines, Houston =

Diplomatic mission of the Philippines in Houston, United States

Consulate General of the Philippines, Houston Konsulado Panlahat ng Pilipinas sa Houston

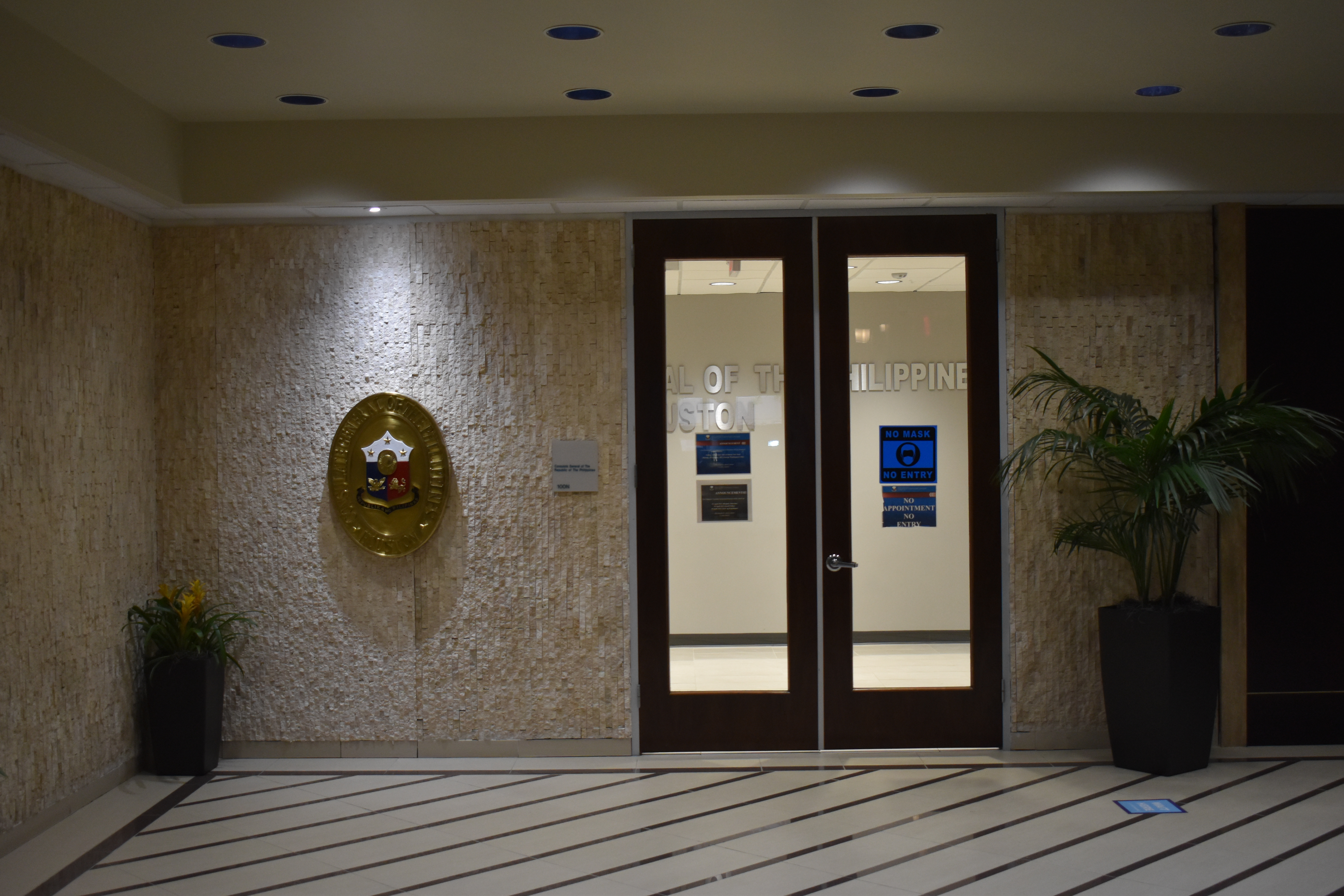
- Location: Houston, Texas
- Address: 9990 Richmond Avenue, Suite 100N
- Coordinates: 29°43′48.0″N 95°32′55.1″W
- Consul General: Gunther Emil M. Sales
- Website: houstonpcg.dfa.gov.ph

The Consulate General of the Philippines in Houston is a diplomatic mission of the Republic of the Philippines in the United States, representing the country's interests in Texas. It is located at the first floor of 9990 Richmond Avenue in the Westchase neighborhood of west Houston.

== History ==
The current Philippine Consulate General in Houston was opened on September 24, 2018, 25 years after the first consulate was closed in September 1993. That first consulate was closed ostensibly due to budget issues, as well as the low number of Filipinos in the area at the time. Closing the first consulate was ordered during the administration of President Corazon Aquino, with holdover consuls heading the post until it was finally closed by her successor, Fidel V. Ramos.

During the existence of the first consulate, Consul General Rodolfo Severino Jr. and other officers called on President Ferdinand Marcos to resign in the run-up to the People Power Revolution that would lead to his ouster. After that consulate was closed, relations were conducted through an honorary consulate, led most recently by Ethel R. Mercado. However, the city's rapidly-growing Filipino community continued to pressure for its reopening, and in January 2018, Foreign Affairs Secretary Alan Peter Cayetano announced that the Consulate would reopen, alongside the future opening of three other missions. Philippine Ambassador to the United States Jose Manuel Romualdez, writing in The Philippine Star, particularly credited Senator Loren Legarda with pushing to allocate more funds for the opening of new Philippine diplomatic missions, including in Houston.

The Consulate reopened out of a temporary space until finally moving to its permanent location, one floor below in the same building, on March 21, 2019.

== Staff and activities ==
The Philippine Consulate General in Houston is headed by Consul General Gunther Emil M. Sales, who assumed the position on July 30, 2024. Prior to his current post, he served as Assistant Secretary for American Affairs at the Department of Foreign Affairs in Manila, and before that was posted at the Philippine Embassy in Washington, D.C. as minister and consul. There are also eleven other staffers deployed to the Consulate.

Currently, the consulate general's jurisdiction covers Texas, Arkansas, Louisiana, Mississippi, New Mexico, and Oklahoma, and also exercises jurisdiction over the honorary consulates in Dallas and New Orleans, with former honorary consul Ethel R. Mercado being appointed to head the Dallas consulate. Prior to its reopening the various states were under the jurisdiction of other missions: Texas and New Mexico were under the jurisdiction of the Philippine Consulate General in Los Angeles, which in partnership with local organizations conducted monthly outreach visits in Houston, while Arkansas, Louisiana, Mississippi and Oklahoma were under the Philippine Consulate General in Chicago. Since its reopening, the consulate general has conducted outreach missions in major cities within its jurisdiction, including in Little Rock, Albuquerque, Jackson, and Oklahoma City, as well as within Texas.

== See also ==
- List of diplomatic missions of the Philippines
- List of diplomatic missions in Houston
