= Highland Village, Houston =

Subdivision in Houston, Texas, United States of America

Coordinates: 29.742°N 95.447°W

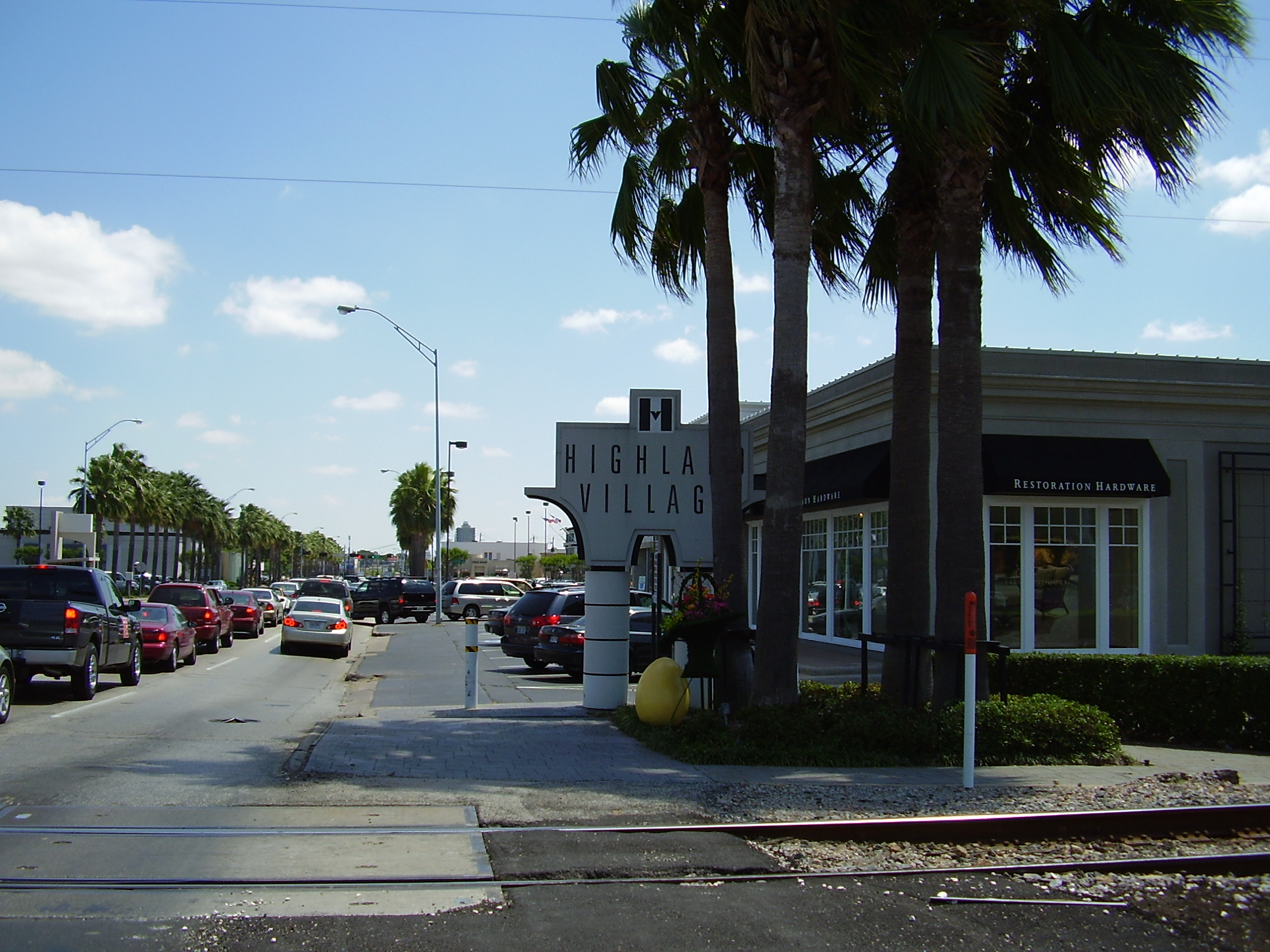
Highland Village Shopping Center

Highland Village is a neighborhood in Houston, Texas, United States.

Highland Village is located inside the 610 Loop in the triangle formed by Greenway Plaza, Uptown, and River Oaks. Highland Village is in the 77027 ZIP code.

The first homes in Highland Village were built in the early 1950s; some of the older homes were torn down and replaced with larger homes in the 2000s.

Nearby Houston neighborhoods include Afton Oaks, Upper Kirby, Lynn Park, Oak Estates, River Oaks, and Weslayan Plaza. The city of West University Place is also close to Highland Village.

Stores in the area include Highland Village Shopping Center, H-E-B's Central Market and Rice Epicurean supermarkets. Shopping in Uptown and the Upper Kirby districts are nearby.

== Education ==
=== Primary and secondary schools ===
==== Public schools ====
Highland Village is served by Houston ISD schools.

Highland Village is zoned to:

- St. George Place Elementary School
- Lanier Middle School
- Lamar High School

===== Gallery of public schools =====
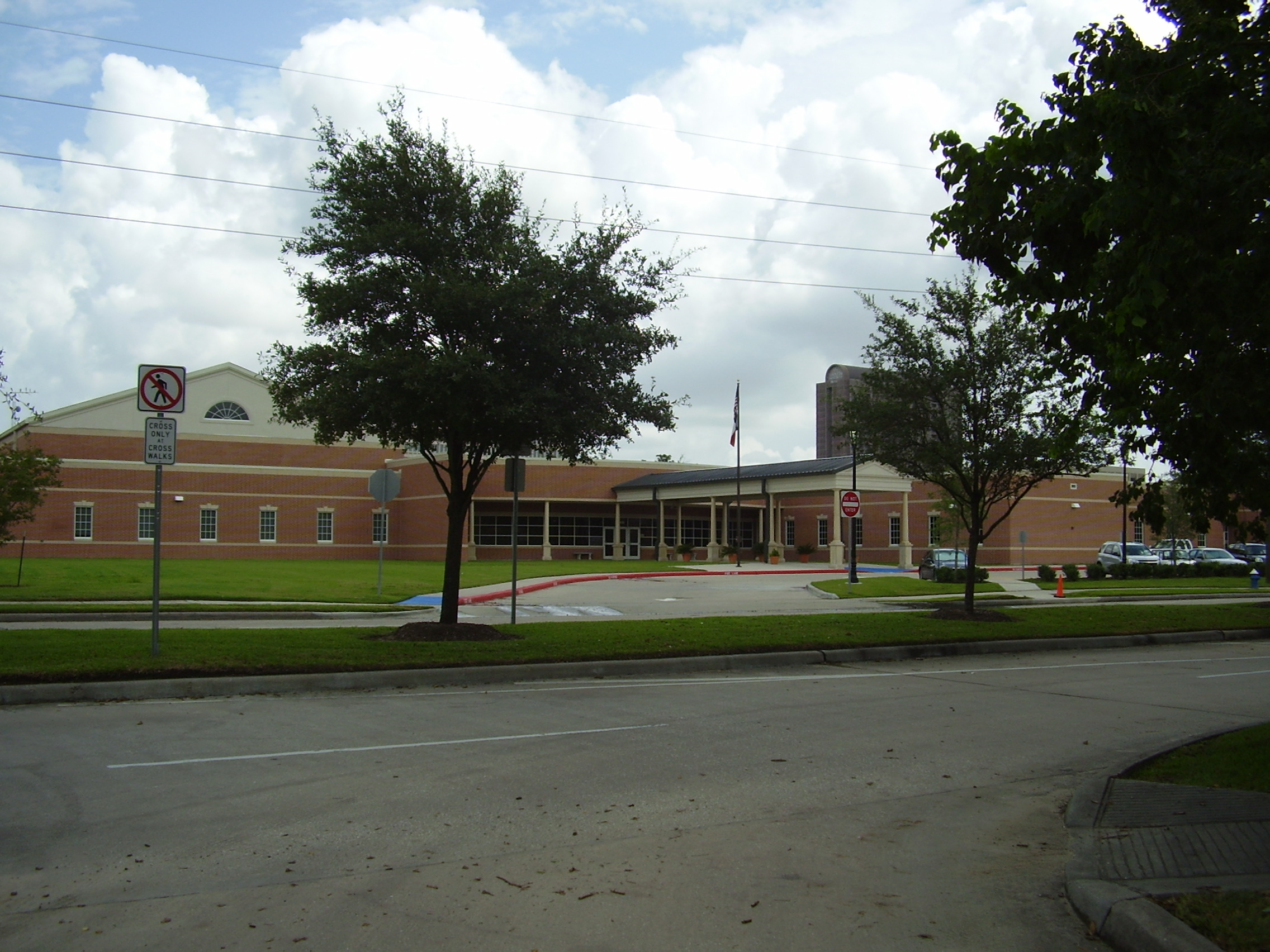
St. George Place Elementary School

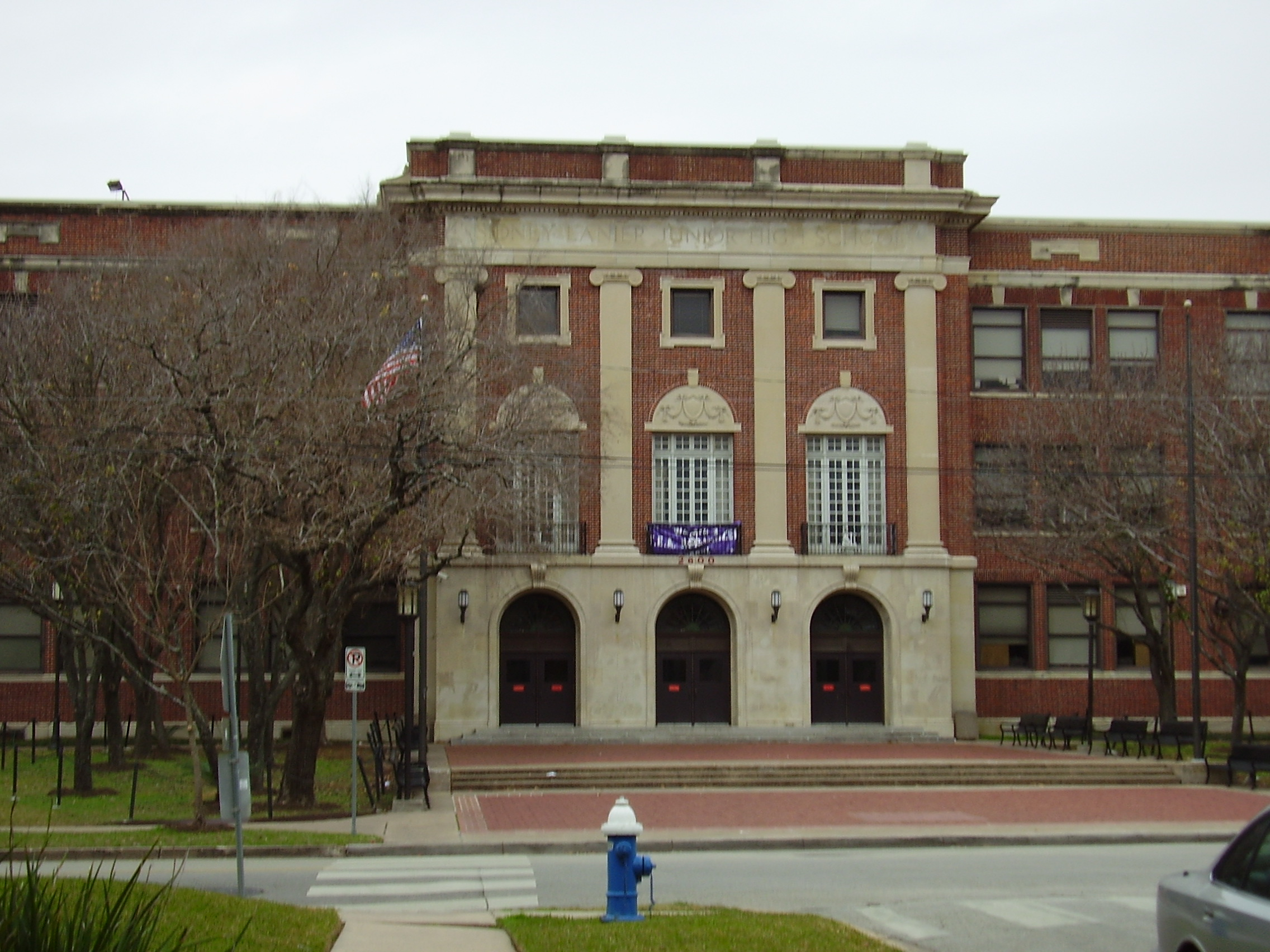
Lanier Middle School

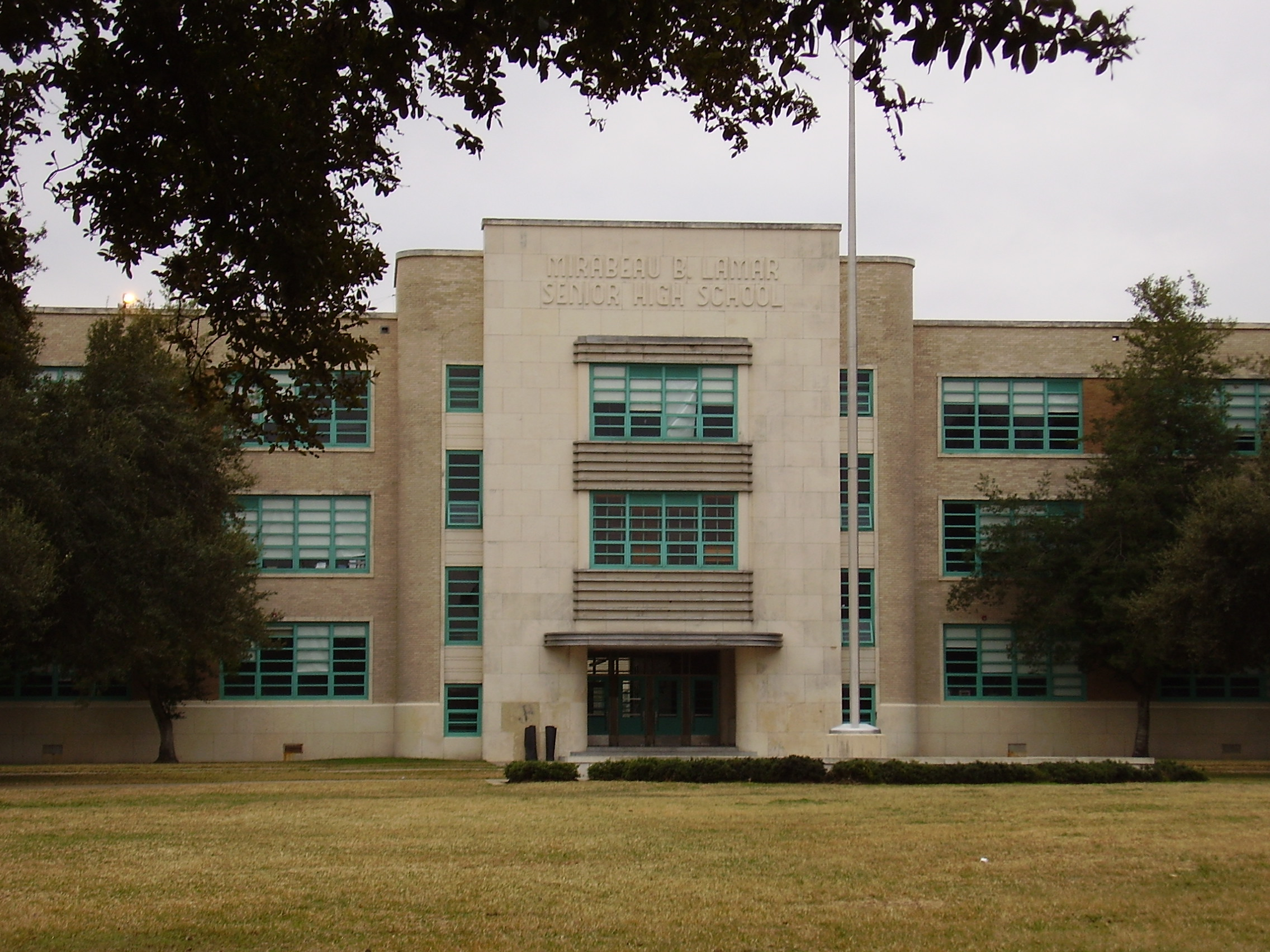
Lamar High School

==== Private schools ====
Nearby private schools include The Kinkaid School and St. John's School.

== Police service ==
The neighborhood is within the Houston Police Department's Central Patrol Division .

== Media ==
The Houston Chronicle is the area regional newspaper.

The River Oaks Examiner is a local newspaper distributed in the community.
