= Alexander-Smith Academy =

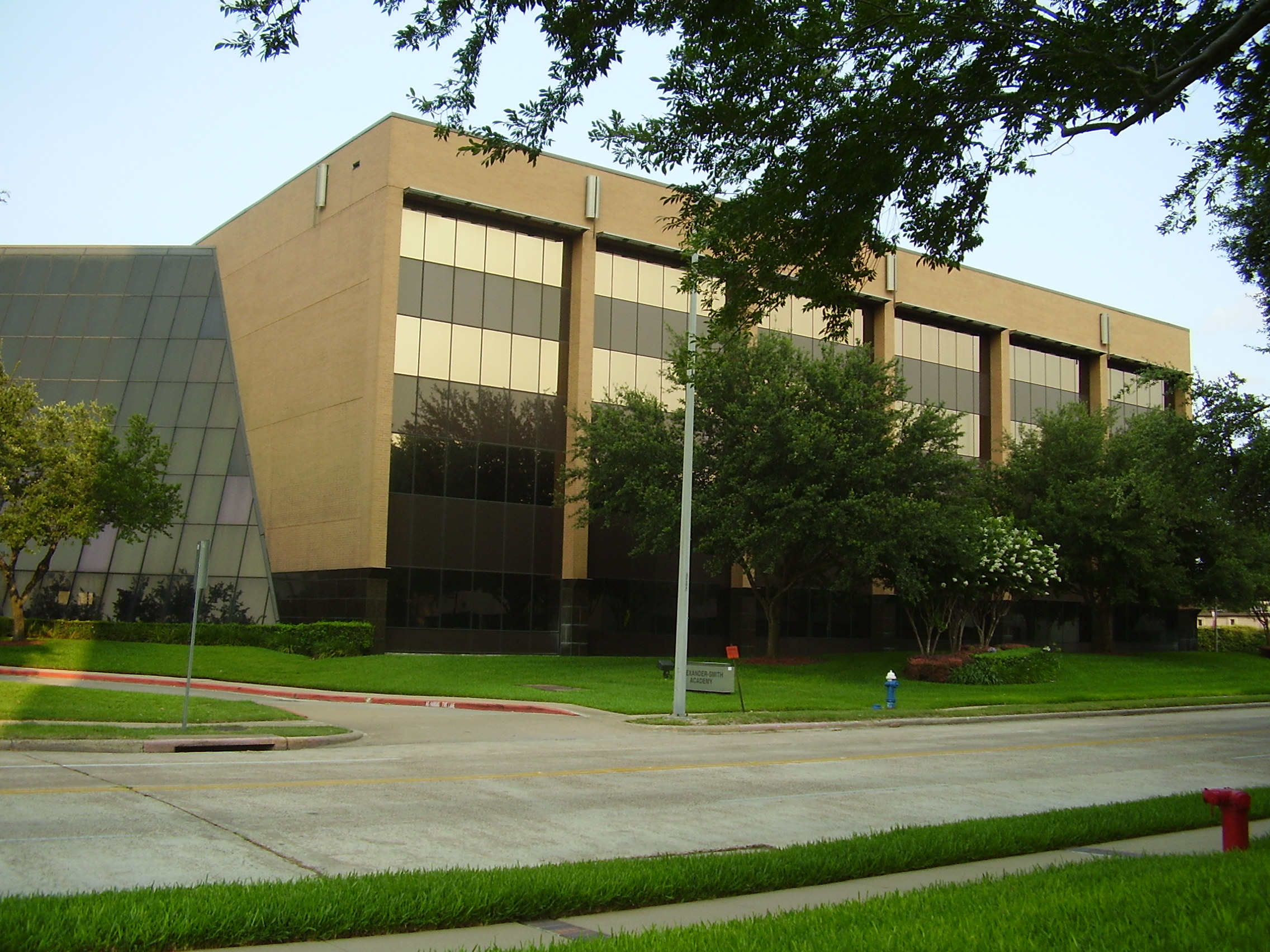
- 10255 Richmond, which housed ASA

Location
- Houston, Texas; United States; 29.7274°N 95.5532°W

Information
- Founded: 1968
- NCES School ID: 02061243
- Faculty: 12
- Enrollment: 70 (2016)
- Website: www.alexandersmith.com
- Last updated: 9 January 2018

Alexander-Smith Academy (ASA) was a private school located at 10255 Richmond Avenue in the Westchase district of Houston, Texas, United States.

== History ==
The school opened in 1968. In 1973 the school received new ownership and the president, J. David Arnold, independently incorporated the school. In 1976 the Southern Association of Colleges and Schools accredited Alexander-Smith. In 1984 the Texas Education Agency accredited Alexander-Smith. The school closed its doors at the conclusion of the 2019–2020 school year.
