= Highland Village Shopping Center =

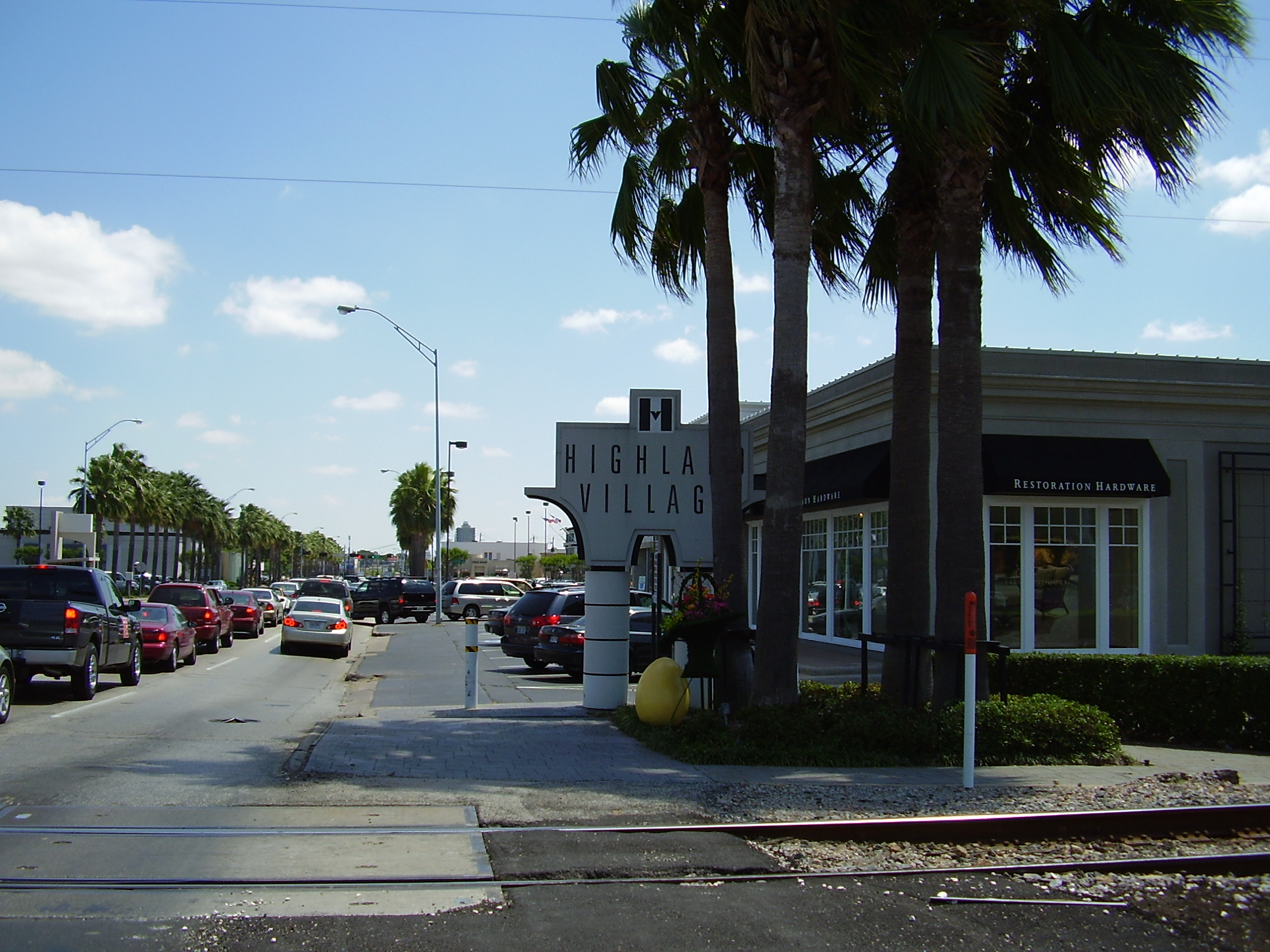
- Location: Houston, Texas United States
- Coordinates: 29.74112°N 95.44634°W
- Address: 4055 Westheimer Road
- Opened: 1940s
- Owner: Haidar Barbouti
- Website: www.shophighlandvillages.com

Highland Village Shopping Center is a mixed-use shopping center on Westheimer Road in Houston, Texas. Highland Village was built in the mid-1940s by S.N. Adams and has been owned by Haidar Barbouti's Highland Village Holdings since 1991. Barbouti is the center's property manager and broker. Stores found at Highland Village include Anthropologie, Crate & Barrel, Pottery Barn, and Williams Sonoma. Its restaurants include Escalante's, Benihana concept restaurant RA Sushi Bar, Smith & Wollensky, and Barbouti's own Up Restaurant. Highland Village was one of the first shopping centers opened in Houston.

== History ==
Highland Village was opened in the mid-1940s by S.N. Adams. Adams named it Highland Village after his native Scotland. Adams was also responsible for establishing the Oak Estates and Highland Village subdivisions that border the shopping center. It was one of the first shopping centers opened in Houston. The Adams family, Highland Village's original owners, sold the shopping center to investors in the early 1960s and the development changed multiple hands until it was purchased by Haidar Barbouti and Highland Village Holdings in 1991.

Barbouti's leadership led to multiple changes at Highland Village. In 1994, the center became was selected by Starbucks to house its first shop in Houston. He also led an initiative in the early 2000s to reshape Highland Village and attract large national stores to the center. Crate & Barrel opened a 39,000 square foot location at Highland Village in 2000. The Crate & Barrel building was later described by architectural historian Stephen Fox as Houston's most ambitious work of retail architecture of the 2000s. By 2004, Barbouti's work at developing and repositioning the center was being recognized throughout the region and the per-square-foot volumes of Highland Village stores such as Williams-Sonoma and Pottery Barn were estimated to be in the top 10 percent of most types of chain according to industry analysts.

In 2008, the center donated the retail space and utilities necessary for Highland Village Adoption Center, a pet adoption center, to open its doors in Highland Village. Quality Life Fitness, Houston's first environmentally conscious fitness facility, opened at Highland Village in 2010. Highland Village's Apple Store opened on March 16, 2012 to coincide with the release of Apple's third generation iPad. The Highland Village location was also the second Apple Store in Texas to include a "briefing room," an area designed for presentations to business customers.

== Notable and anchor stores ==
- Anthropologie
- Crate & Barrel
- L'Occitane en Provence
- Pottery Barn
- Restoration Hardware
- Williams-Sonoma

== Restaurants ==
- Escalante's
- Sweet Paris
- Numero28
- Gauchos Do Sul
