= Westchase, Houston =

Westchase
- Business district of Houston, Texas
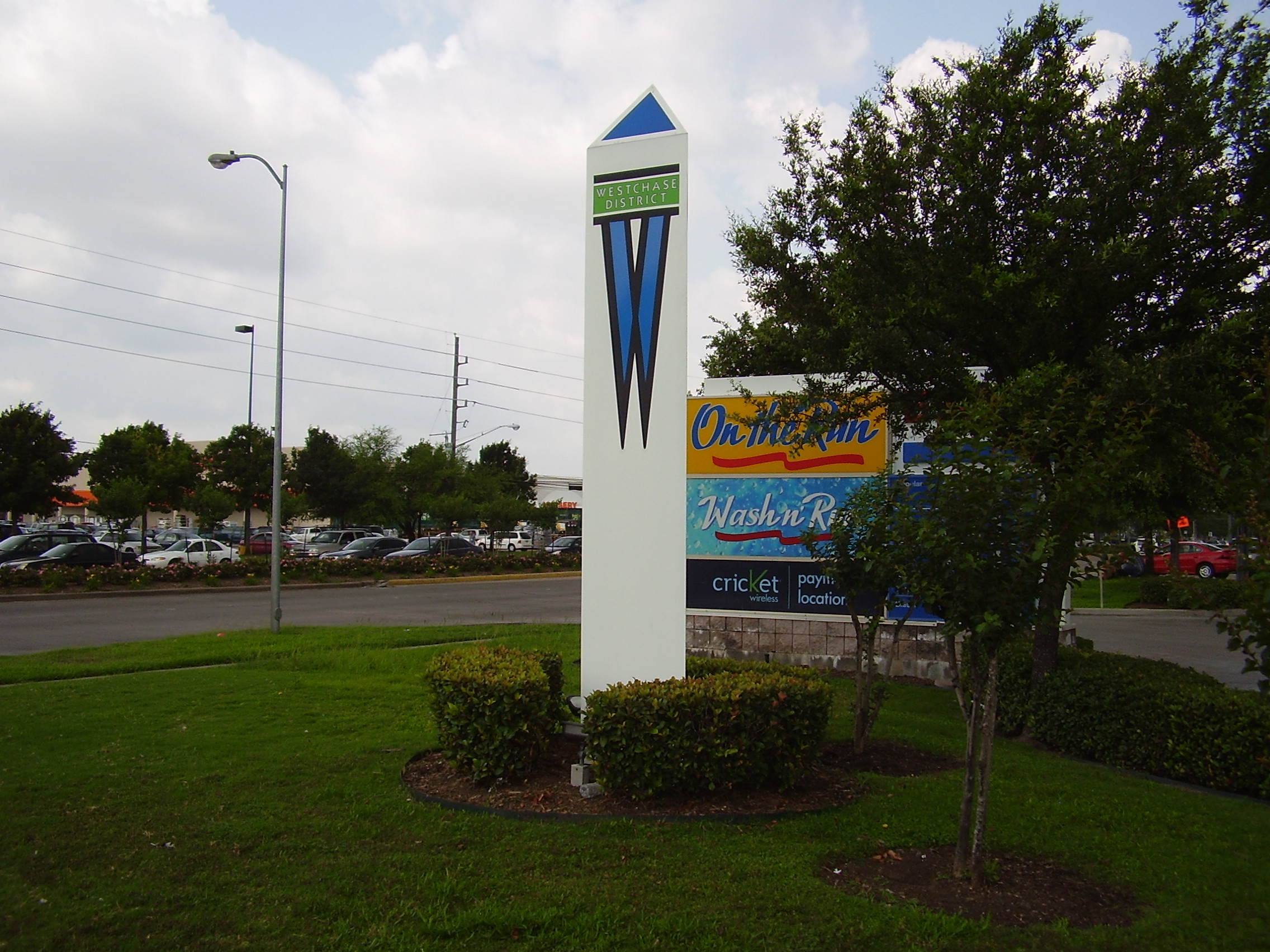
- Marker of the Westchase District
- Interactive map of Westchase
- Coordinates: 29.729°N 95.564°W
- Country: United States
- State: Texas
- County: Harris
- City: Houston

Government
  - Type: Special district
  - Body: Westchase Management District

Area
  - Total: 4.32 sq mi (11.2 km^{2})

Population (2012)
  - Total: 26,122
  - Density: 6,050/sq mi (2,330/km^{2})
- Time zone: Central Standard Time (CST)
- ZIP Code: 77057, 77063
- Area codes: 281, 346, 713, 832
- Website: westchasedistrict.com

Westchase is a business district and neighborhood in western Houston, Texas, bounded by Westheimer Road on the north, Gessner Road on the east, Houston Center Boulevard on the west, and Westpark Tollway on the south. The area is bisected by Beltway 8. Westchase is adjacent to Greater Sharpstown, the International District (which includes part of Chinatown), and the Royal Oaks Country Club subdivision. The area is immediately northeast of Alief.

A large portion of Westchase is covered by a special district, the Westchase Management District, which was created by the Texas Legislature in 1995. This entity, funded by a tax increment on businesses within its boundaries, provides branding, urban planning, and public safety functions for its constituents.

More than 1,500 businesses reside in Westchase; several are associated with the petroleum industry, for which Houston is considered a major capital. Major employers that have offices in Westchase include ABB Group, BMC Software, Chevron, Phillips 66, Dow Chemical, Petrochina, and Jacobs Engineering. The Westchase management district is approximately 4.32 square miles (11.2 km^{2}) in size, with 16.3 million square feet (1,510,000 m^{2}) of office space contained in 118 buildings.

In 2006 Westchase was described by John Nova Lomax of the Houston Press as suburban in nature, with a high concentration of chain stores along its major arterial roads.

== History ==
In the 1950s, large portions of Westchase were purchased by Robert E. Smith, a Houston oilman and philanthropist well known for creating the Houston Colt .45s baseball team. In 1969, Friendswood Development Company purchased a section of Smith's land to form what is now Woodlake, a residential subdivision at the intersection of Westheimer and Gessner. In 1973, Westchase Corporation, the predecessor to the modern management district, purchased 760 acres (3.1 km^{2}) of Smith's land and began preparing land parcels for corporate development. Chevron and Western Geophysical were some of the first companies to establish operations in the district.

Construction on Beltway 8 (the Sam Houston Tollway) through the area began in 1985 and was completed in 1988. Financing for this section of the tollway was particularly challenging, as the Texas Department of Transportation's right-of-way acquisition program coincided with the rapid development of Westchase and Sharpstown, induced by the 1970s energy crisis. In order to ensure that the highway would be built, landowners and developers in Westchase and Sharpstown formed the Beltway 8 Group, which coordinated with TxDOT to lock in property values at rates the state could afford.

In the early 1990s, BMC Software relocated its headquarters from Sugar Land to a new 20-story tower in Westchase.

Legislation creating the Westchase District was passed by the 73rd Texas State Legislature and became law on August 28, 1995.

In 2012, after splitting from ConocoPhillips, Phillips 66 began construction on a 14-acre (5.7 ha) corporate headquarters in the district. The project was completed in 2016. That same year, due to the 2010s oil glut, Halliburton moved out of its 48-acre (19-hectare) campus near Chinatown, and Maersk Oil ended operations in the area.

== Economy ==
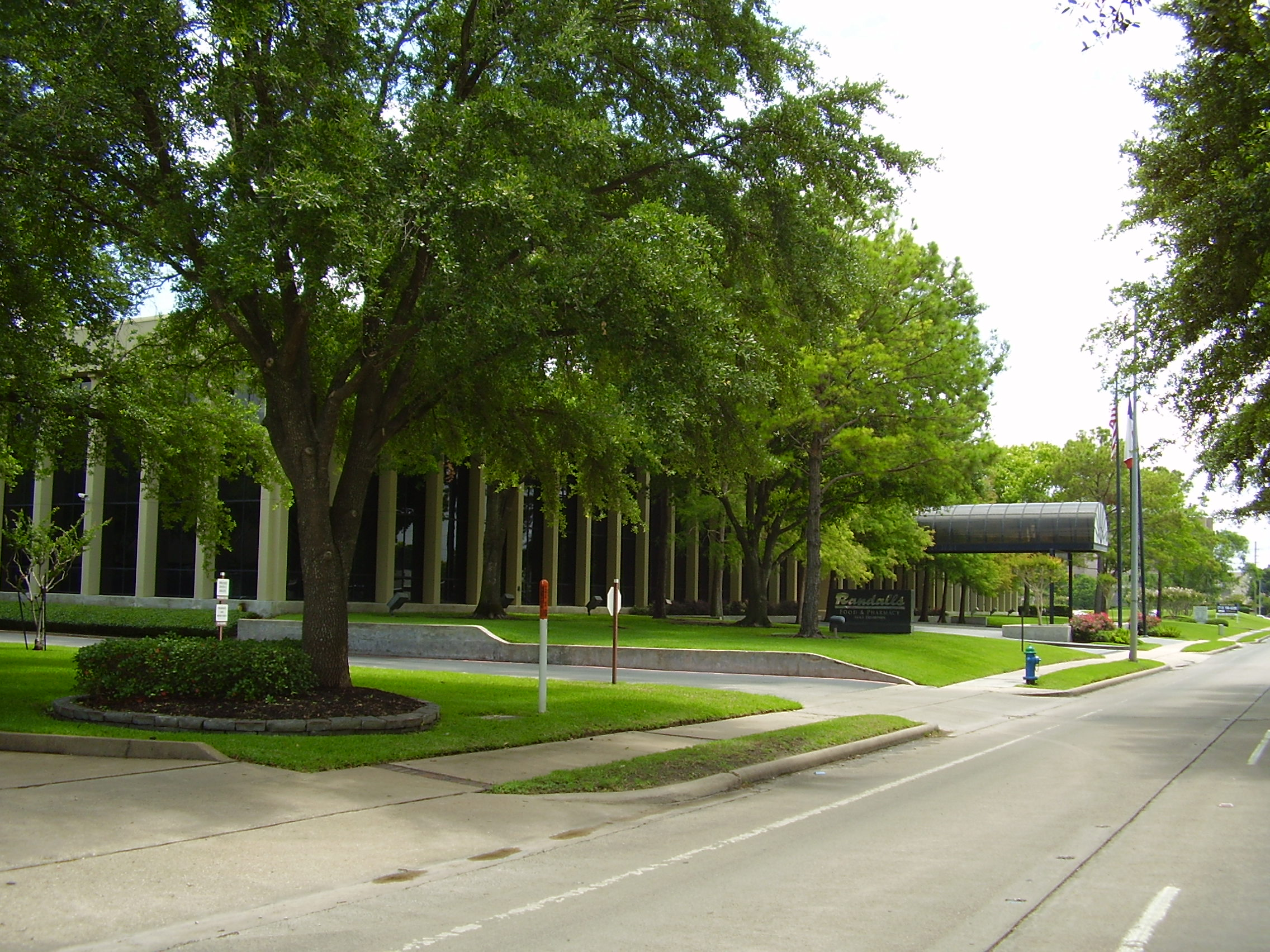
Randall's Food Markets headquarters

The following companies have regional or international headquarters in Westchase:

- BMC Software
- Phillips 66
- Geokinetics
- The Men's Wearhouse
- Randall's Food Markets
- Statoil

Additionally, the following companies have operations in Westchase:

- Jacobs Engineering Group
- Chevron Corporation
- PetroChina
- WesternGeco
- ABB Group
- KRBE, a radio station
- Compuware
- Vroom, Inc.

Westchase is home to a growing number of hotels; between 2014 and 2016, the hotel market in the district grew by 9%. The two flagship full-service hotels in the district are the Marriott Westchase and the Houston Hilton Westchase.

Westchase is home to one of Houston's only Japanese markets, the Nippan Daido (大道日本食料品店 Daidō Nihon Shokuryōhinden).

In 2022 the Bechtel announced it would move its Houston area offices, currently in the Houston Galleria area, to Westchase effective late 2023.

In 2023 Mattress Firm announced it would move its headquarters to Westchase as the lease at its current headquarters ends.

Halliburton previously operated the Houston Office (a.k.a. Oak Park Campus) on 67 acres (27 ha) of land located in Chinatown and in the Westchase district. The complex included the Latin America division of Easywell, a division of Halliburton. The building first opened as a Brown and Root facility in 1979. In 2009 the Westchase campus had 1,700 employees; Halliburton plans to increase its workforce at Oak Park to 3,000 workers. At the Bellaire site Halliburton plans to build a 16-story tower, a two-story "life center", an additional parking garage, expanded child care facilities, auditoriums, and bridges to connect the many buildings. In 2009 Halliburton had about 1,000 employees worked in leased office space in Westchase. During that year Halliburton stated that it planned to vacate the leased space. The plans for the Oak Park office had been delayed by one year, and Halliburton expected completion in 2013. However Halliburton closed the facility in 2015, and in 2020 a planned demolition was revealed.

== Diplomatic missions ==
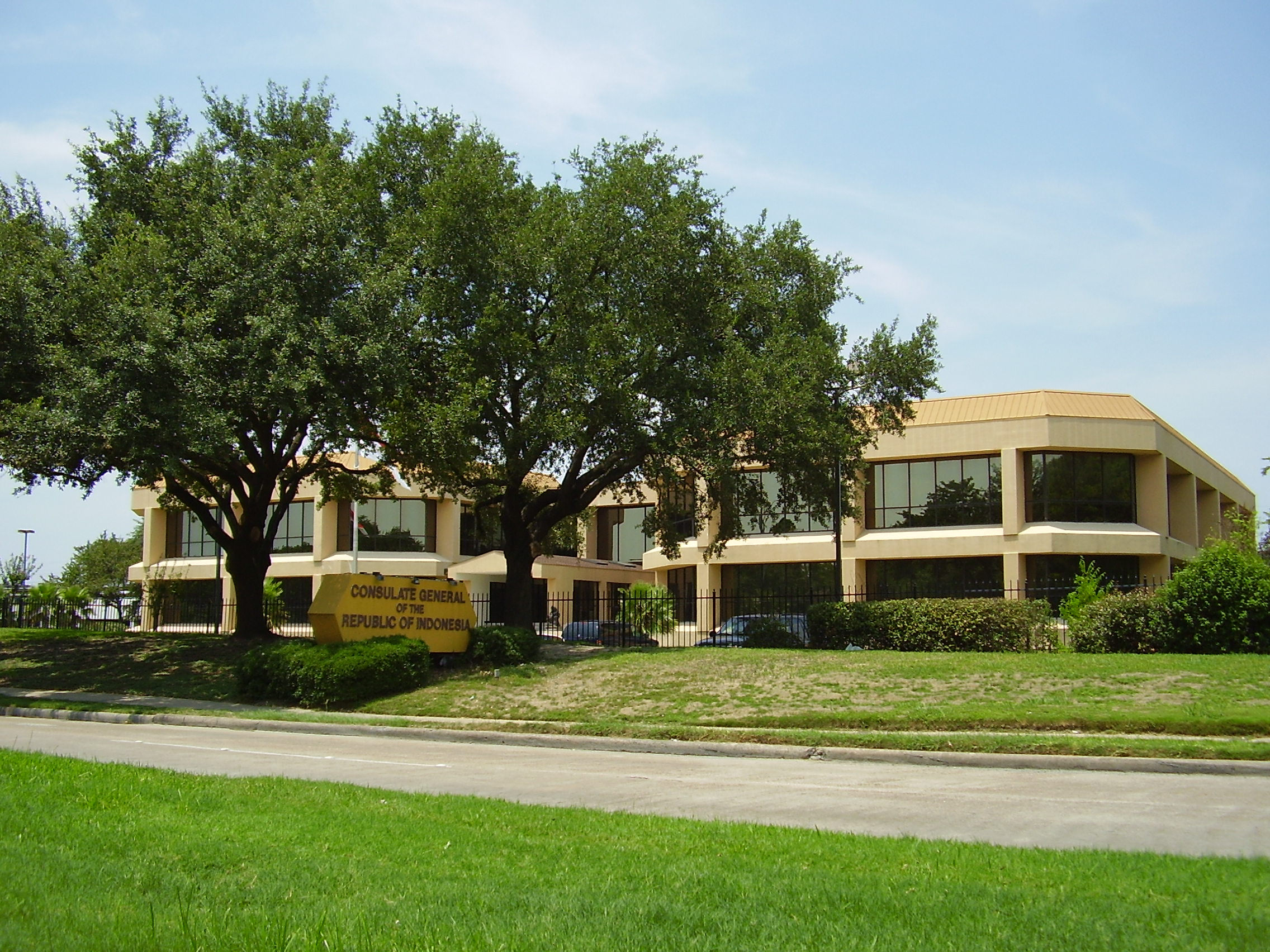
Consulate-General of the Republic of Indonesia in Houston

The consulate generals of Costa Rica, Indonesia, and the Philippines reside in Westchase. The Indonesian consulate has been in Westchase since 1993. The Philippines consulate opened on September 24, 2018.

In 2015, Saudi Arabia submitted plans to construct a new 3-acre (12,000 m^{2}) general consulate complex in Westchase.

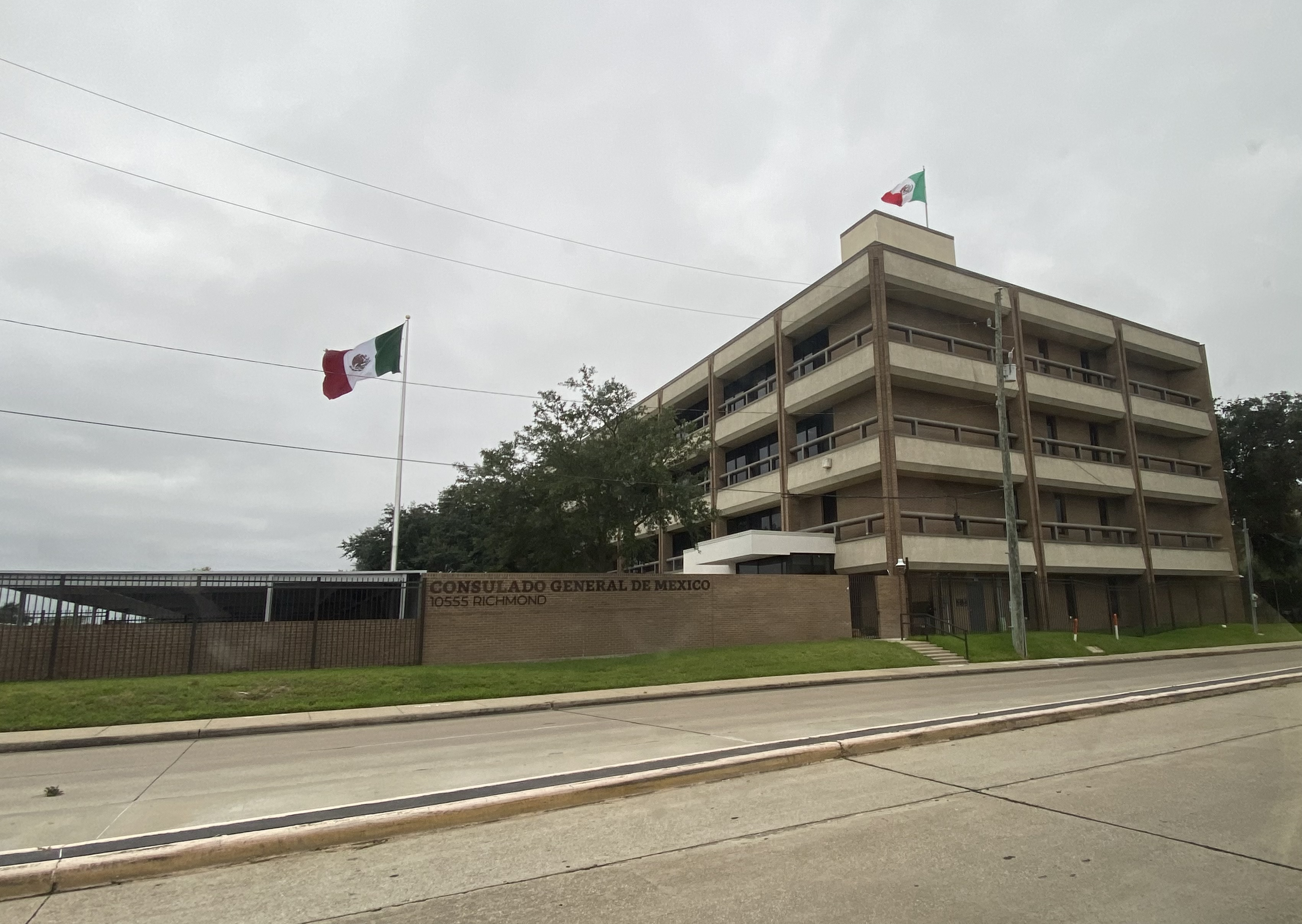
The current location of the Consulate-General of Mexico in Houston.

In 2019 the Mexican government agreed to give the state government of Texas the land of the Consulate-General of Mexico, in Southeast Houston, in exchange for the state giving the Mexican government 3 acres (1.2 ha) of land in Westchase, that was previously state property. The move is rebuilding so the state government can reconstruct freeways in the Southeast Houston area. The current Mexican consulate opened in June 2021.

== Demographics ==
In 2015 the Westchase Super Neighborhood, defined by the City of Houston and with boundaries different from that of the Westchase Management District, had 29,149 residents in 2015. 33% of them were non-Hispanic black, 26% were Hispanic, 25% were non-Hispanic white, 13% were non-Hispanic Asians, and 2% were non-Hispanic others. The super neighborhood had 21,017 residents in 2000. Of the residents, 40% were non-Hispanic white, 22% were Hispanics, 23% were non-Hispanic black, 13% were non-Hispanic Asians, and 2% were non-Hispanic others.

== Government and infrastructure ==
=== Municipal services ===
Westchase is located in Houston City Council district F.

Two Houston Fire Department stations, Station 69 Westchase and Station 83 Royal Oaks, serve Westchase. Both stations are a part of Fire District 83. Station 69, located on Beltway 8, opened in 1980, after rapid area development stressed existing emergency infrastructure. Station 83 opened in 2005.

The Houston Police Department's Westside and Uptown Divisions serve separate sections of the district.

=== County, state, and federal representation ===
Westchase is located in Harris County Precinct 3, which is headed by Commissioner Steve Radack.

The United States Postal Service operates the Westchase and Debora Sue Schatz post offices in the district.

== Education ==
=== Colleges and universities ===
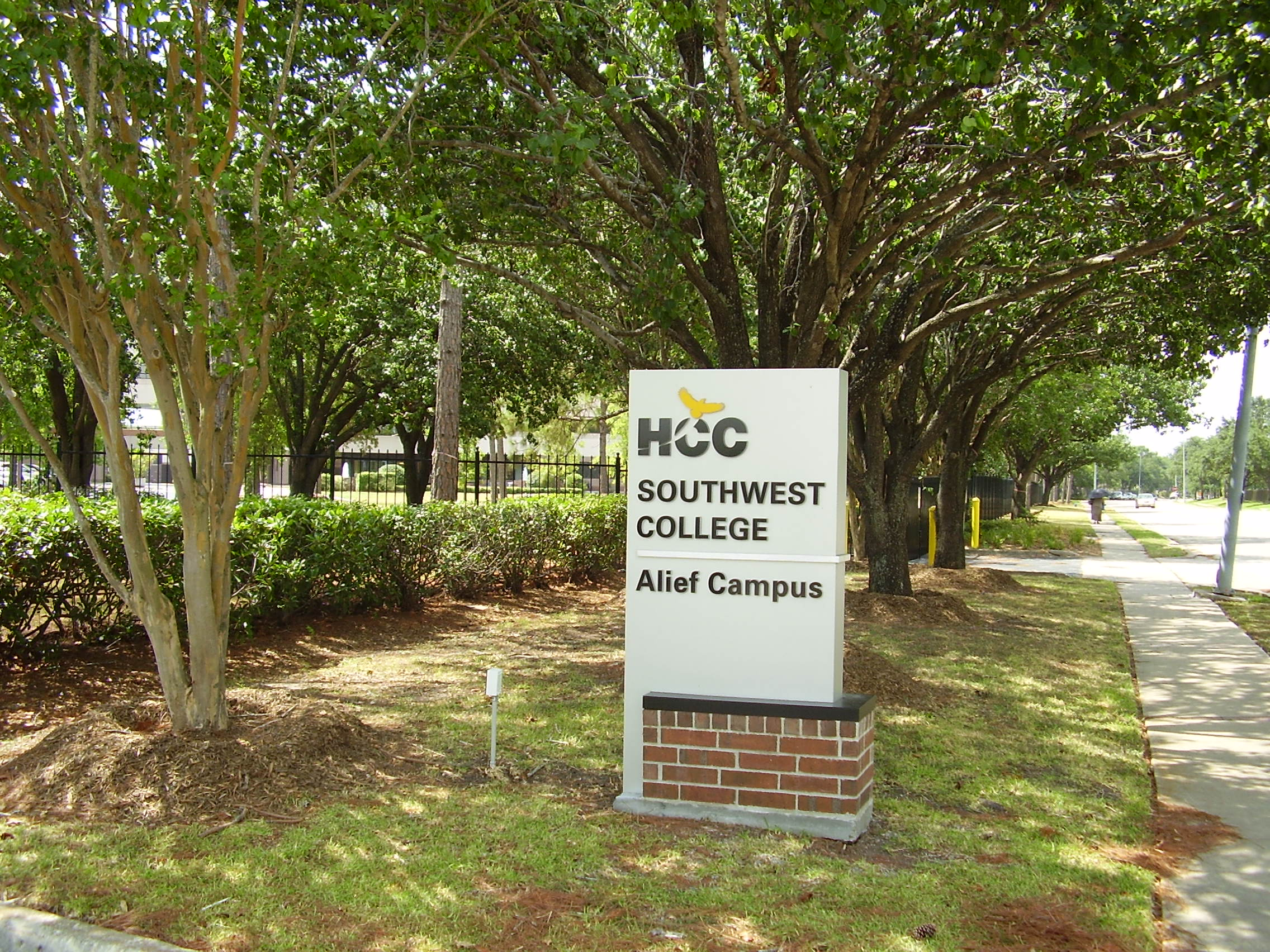
Houston Community College Alief Campus

Houston Community College Alief Campus, opened in 2007, is located along Westheimer in Westchase. In 2017, the West Houston Institute, a STEM-focused facility, opened adjacent to HCC Alief.

American InterContinental University, a for-profit institution, operates its Houston campus in the district. Remington College opened a campus in the district in 1997.

=== Primary and secondary education ===
Much of Westchase is zoned to Alief Independent School District.

==== Public schools ====
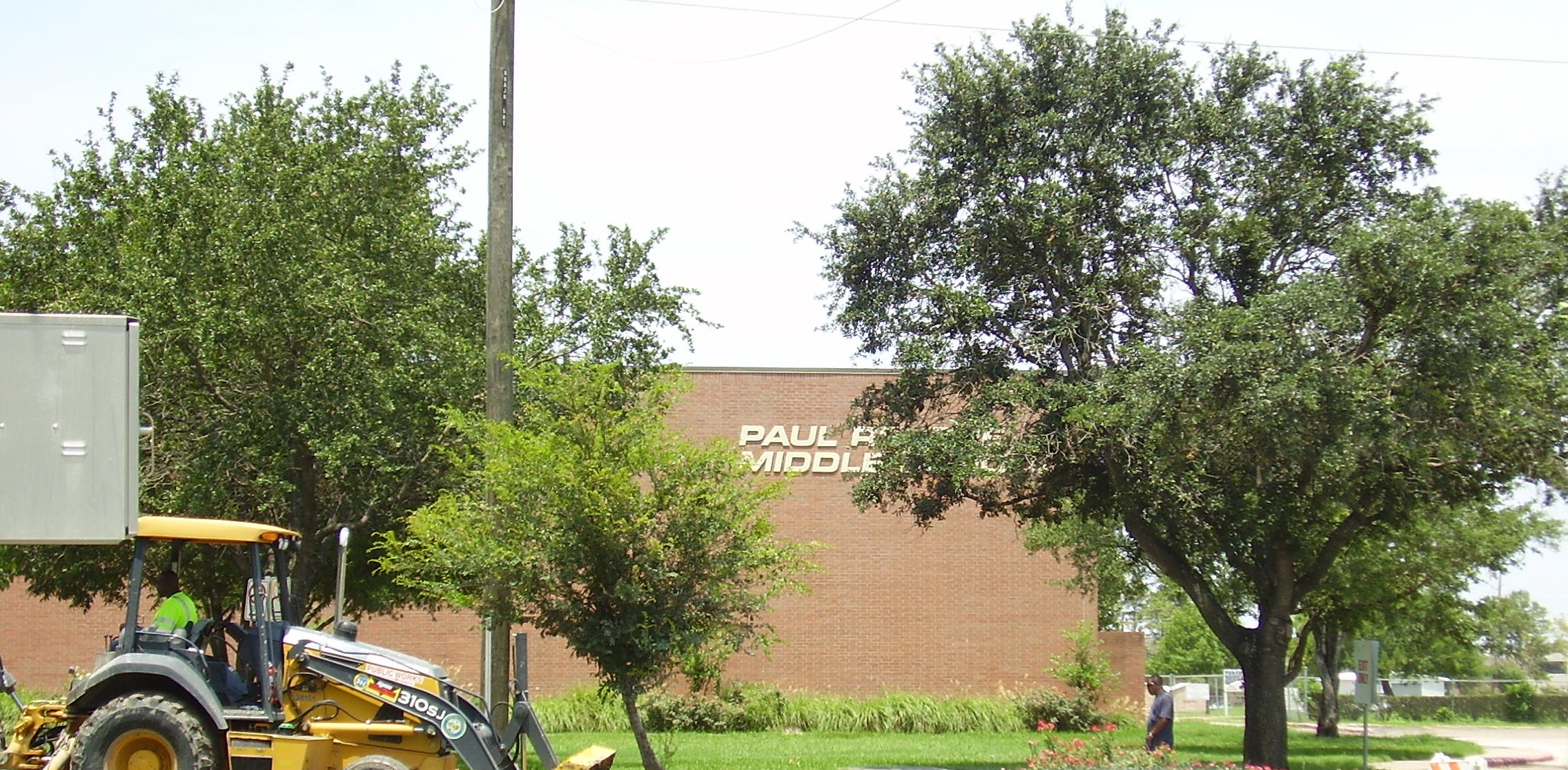
Revere Middle School

Most of Westchase, which is south of Westheimer Road (Farm to Market Road 1093) and west of Gessner Road, is zoned to schools in Alief Independent School District, while the parts north of Westheimer and parts east of Gessner Road are zoned to the Houston Independent School District.

Two AISD public schools are located within the boundaries of the district, Alief Early College High School and Sneed Elementary School.

The school zoning for the Alief ISD portion is as follows:

- The portion inside Beltway 8 south of Westheimer and west of Gessner is zoned to Sneed Elementary School (Sneed Elementary is in Westchase District Section 5), Budewig Intermediate School, and O'Donnell Middle School.
- The portion outside Beltway 8 north of the Westpark Tollway and south of Westheimer is zoned to Outley Elementary School, Budewig Intermediate School, and O'Donnell Middle School.
- The portion outside Beltway 8 south of the Westpark Tollway is zoned to Chancellor Elementary School (Bilingual students go to Youens Elementary School), Owens Intermediate School, and Alief Middle School.
- Westchase students in Alief ISD may attend Elsik, Hastings, and Taylor high schools, as high school assignments in Alief ISD are determined by a lottery.

The school zoning for the Houston ISD portion is as follows:

- Areas north of Westheimer and west of East Rivercrest are zoned to: Walnut Bend Elementary School, Paul Revere Middle School (Revere is located in Westchase) with West Briar Middle School as an option, and Westside High School.
- Areas north of Westheimer, east of East Rivercrest, and west of Gessner are zoned to: Emerson Elementary School, Paul Revere Middle School (with West Briar Middle School as an option) and Westside High School.
- Areas west of Gessner (whether north or south of Westheimer) are zoned to: Emerson Elementary School, Paul Revere Middle School, and Lee High School with Lamar High School and Westside High School as boundary transfer options.
  - Residents of the Emerson Elementary School attendance zone may apply for the Briarmeadow Charter School.
  - Residents zoned to Westside may transfer to Lamar High School.

==== Private schools ====
Private schools in Westchase include Alexander-Smith Academy, River Oaks Academy, Wesley Academy, Woodlake Square Children's Center, Ascension Episcopal School, Children's World Learning Center, and the Grace Presbyterian Church and School. Westchase Methodist School is a preschool and kindergarten in Westchase. The Tenney School is also in Westchase.

=== Public libraries ===
The area is served by the Judson W. Robinson-Westchase Neighborhood Library of Houston Public Library at 3223 Wilcrest Drive. The branch is named for Judson W. Robinson Jr. (1932-1990), who in 1971 became the first African-American elected to the Houston City Council. The library, originally opened in 1991, was closed for major renovations in the fall of 2016, and re-opened in the spring of 2018.

== Transportation ==
METRO maintains a park and ride station for commuting to the central city. This station's construction had an anticipated start date of September, and there were plans for it to have spaces for 1,473 vehicles.

== Parks, recreation, and culture ==
The Westchase District maintains a network of trails along a tributary of Brays Bayou which flows through the center of the district. The Brays Bayou Connector, which commenced construction in 2016, will connect Richmond Avenue and Bellaire Boulevard with a 1.92-mile (3.09 km) grade-separated trail, providing pedestrian and bicyclist access to the International District and Arthur Story Park. The district government had revealed its initial plans for it in 2012. Another section opened in 2016.

In 2016 the city government bought 3.4 acres (1.4 ha) of land, on two plots adjacent to the library, to create a park there. Houston City Council voted to approve creation of a park the following year. Wilcrest Park is scheduled to begin operations in December 2022. Woodchase Park, 1.75 acres (0.71 ha) in size, had its opening scheduled for October 2021. Prior to the openings of these parks, as of 2020, Trust for Public Land described Westchase as having a below average number of public parks for a city neighborhood.

Harris County operates Tracy Gee Community Center, named after Tracy A. Gee (simplified Chinese: 朱秀娟; traditional Chinese: 硃秀娟; pinyin: Zhū Xiùjuān), a Chinese American university student who was murdered in 1990. The center opened in 1993.

The Taipei Economic and Cultural Office in Houston maintains the Chinese Cultural Center in Westchase.

By 2020 the farmers market in Westchase had an increase in traffic during the COVID-19 pandemic in Texas.

Congregation Or Ami, a Jewish congregation, is located in Westchase. As of 2018 the rabbi is Gideon Estes.

== Image gallery ==
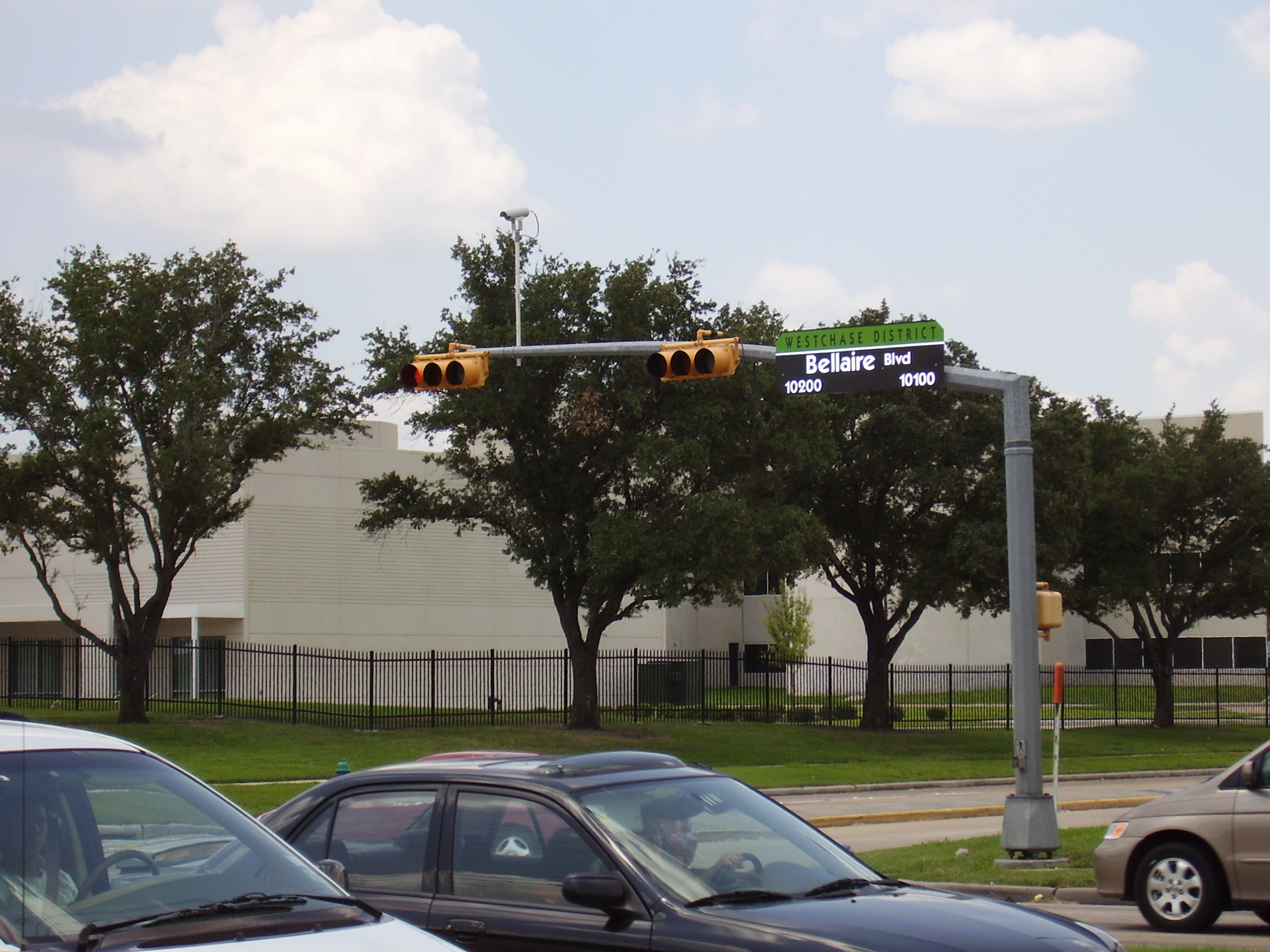
A street sign in Westchase branded by the management district.

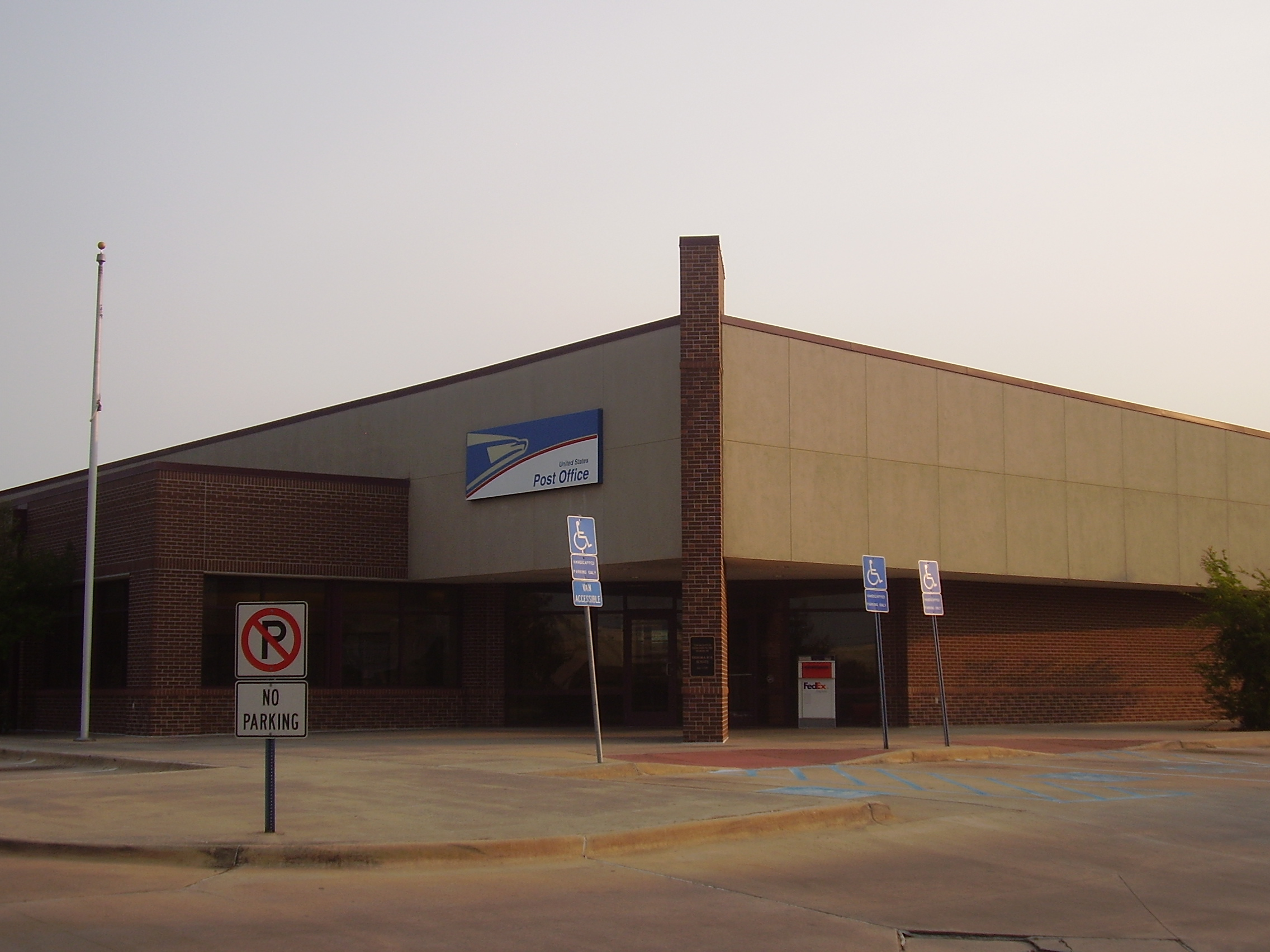
Deborah Sue Schatz Post Office

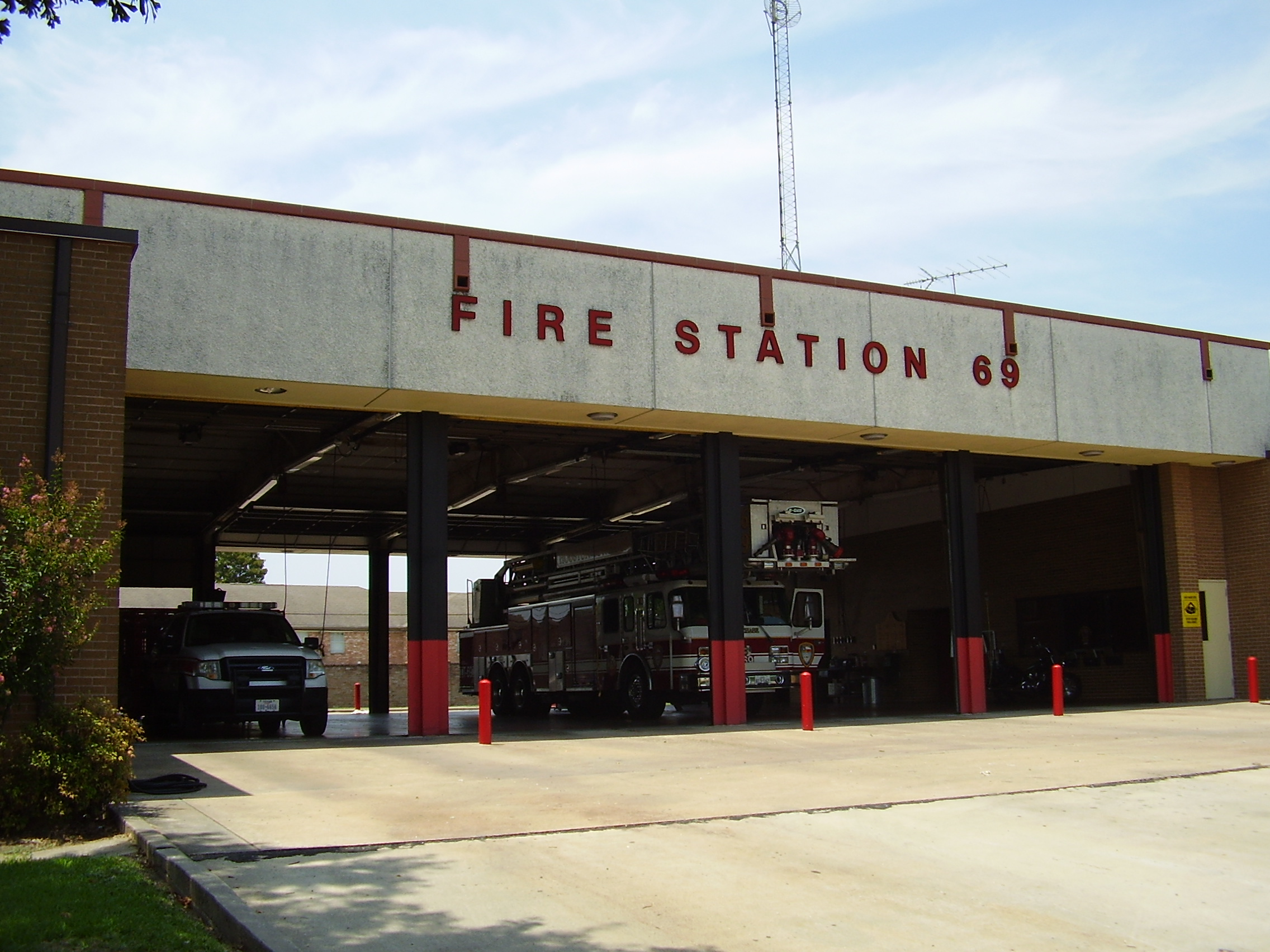
Houston Fire Department Station 69

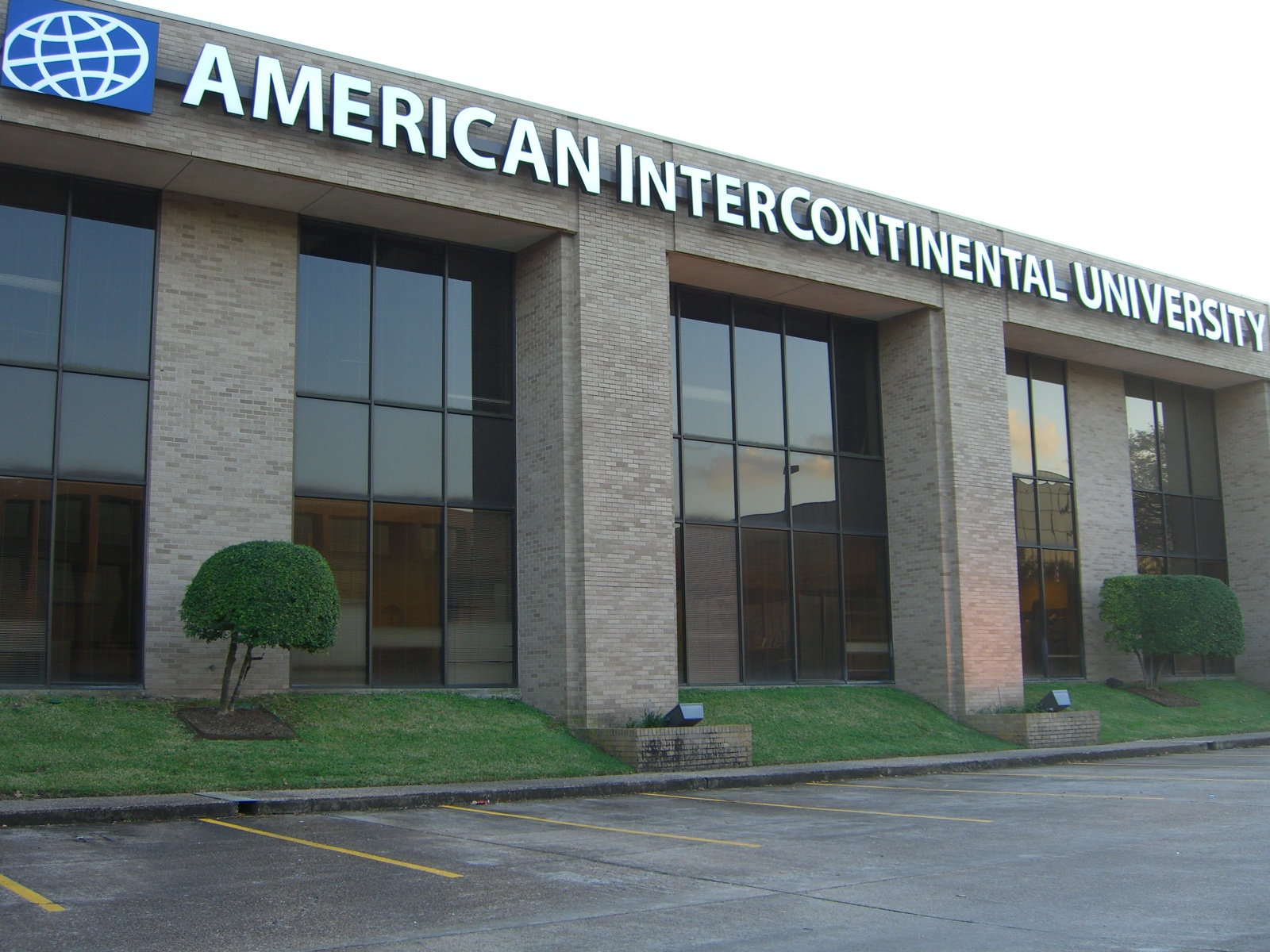
American InterContinental University

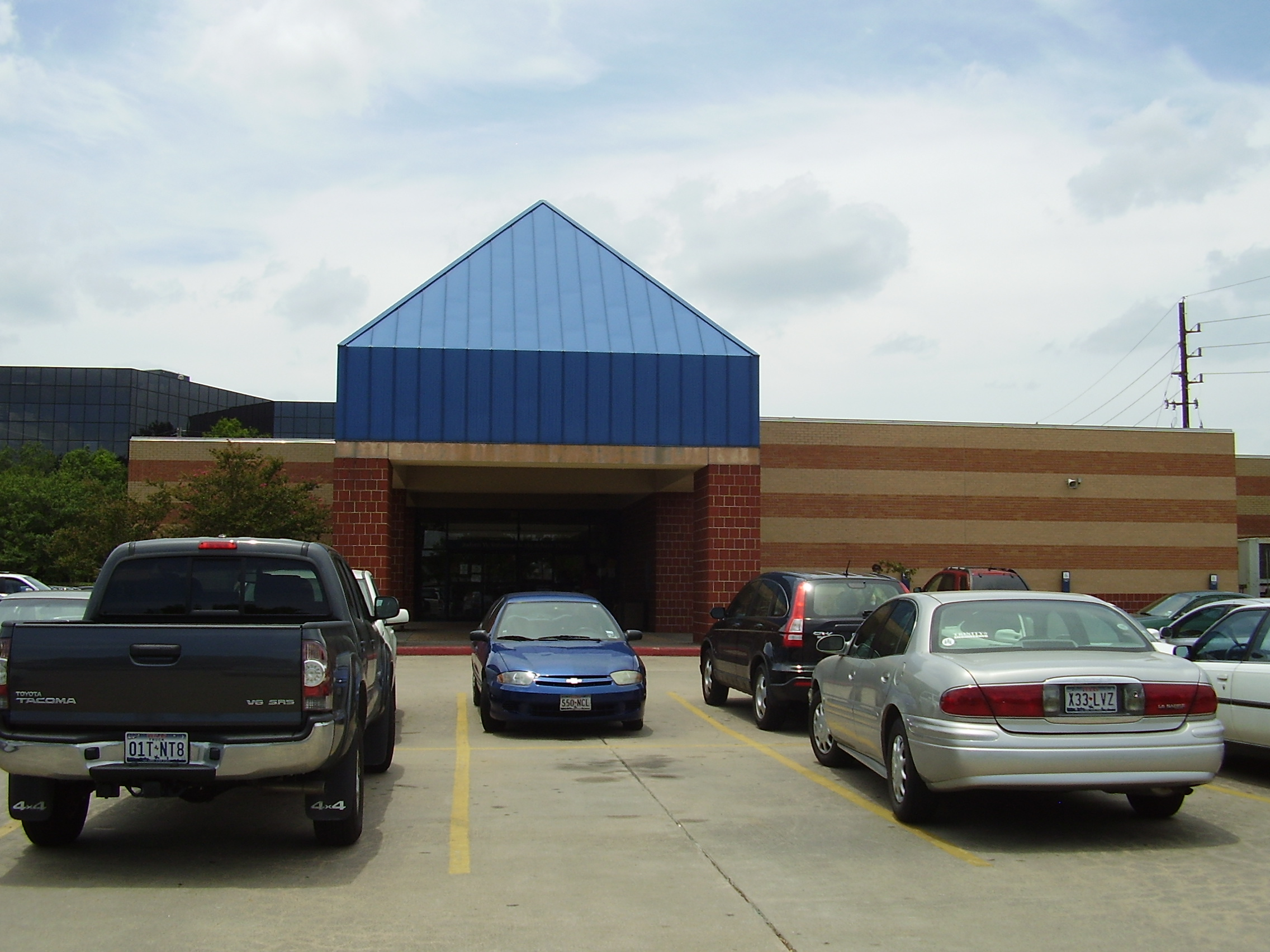
Judson W. Robinson-Westchase Neighborhood Library (pictured here in 2009; extensively renovated between 2016 and 2018)

== See also ==
- List of Houston neighborhoods
