= Gulfton, Houston =

Coordinates: 29.727564°N 95.483036°W

Gulfton
- Neighborhood of Houston
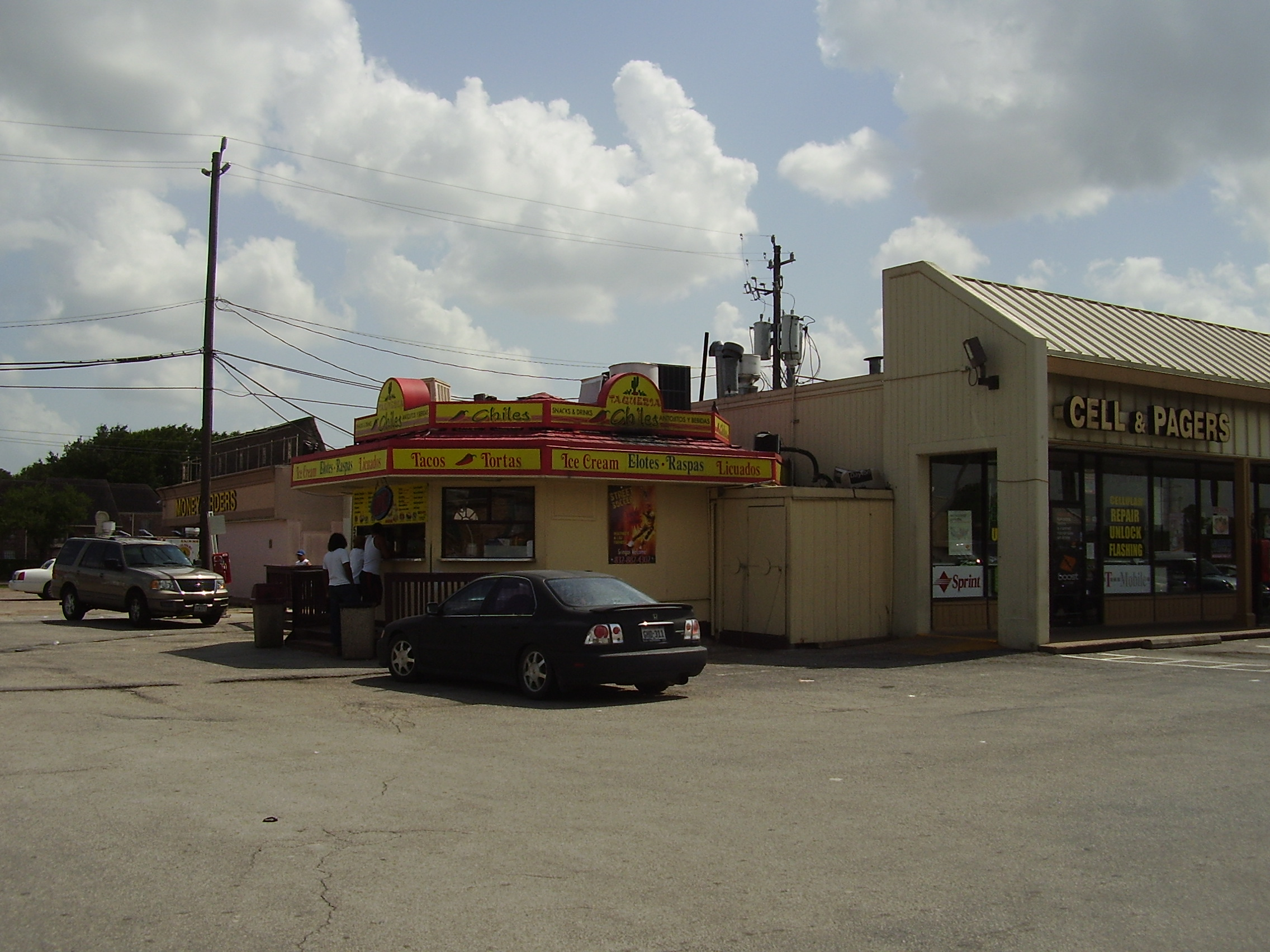
- A shopping center in Gulfton

- Country: United States
- State: Texas

Population
  - Estimate (2000): 46,287
  - Urban density: 14,477/sq mi (5,590/km^{2})
- Time zone: UTC-6 (CST)
  - Summer (DST): UTC-5 (CDT)

Gulfton is a community in Southwest Houston, Texas, United States3.2 sq mi (8.3 km^{2}). It is located between the 610 Loop and Beltway 8, west of the City of Bellaire, southeast of Interstate 69/U.S. Highway 59, and north of Bellaire Boulevard.

In the 1960s and 1970s Gulfton experienced rapid development, with new apartment complexes built for young individuals from the Northeast and Midwest United States. They came to work in the oil industry during the 1970s oil boom.

In the 1980s, as the economy declined, existing tenants left, resulting in a significant drop in occupancy rates in the apartment complexes and forcing many complexes into bankruptcy and foreclosure. Owners marketed the empty units to newly arrived immigrants and Gulfton became a predominantly immigrant community. In the 1980s, the community of Gulfton experienced a surge in crime and a significant increase in student enrollment, leading Houston citizens to dub it the "Gulfton Ghetto." In response, the city and school district took action, increasing police presence and opening new schools.

Since then, the community has undergone positive changes, including the addition of a community college campus, elementary schools, public transportation routes, a park, a community center, a public library, and a juvenile detention facility.

By 2000 Gulfton was the most densely populated community in Houston, with 71 percent Hispanic residents, including many recent immigrants from Mexico and Central America. Although traditionally a Salvadoran and Mexican neighborhood, many immigrants began coming from different Latin-American countries, particularly from Venezuela, Honduras, Cuba, Guatemala and Colombia. There are also American citizens from other states and territories like Puerto Rico.

== History ==
=== 1950s to 1979 ===
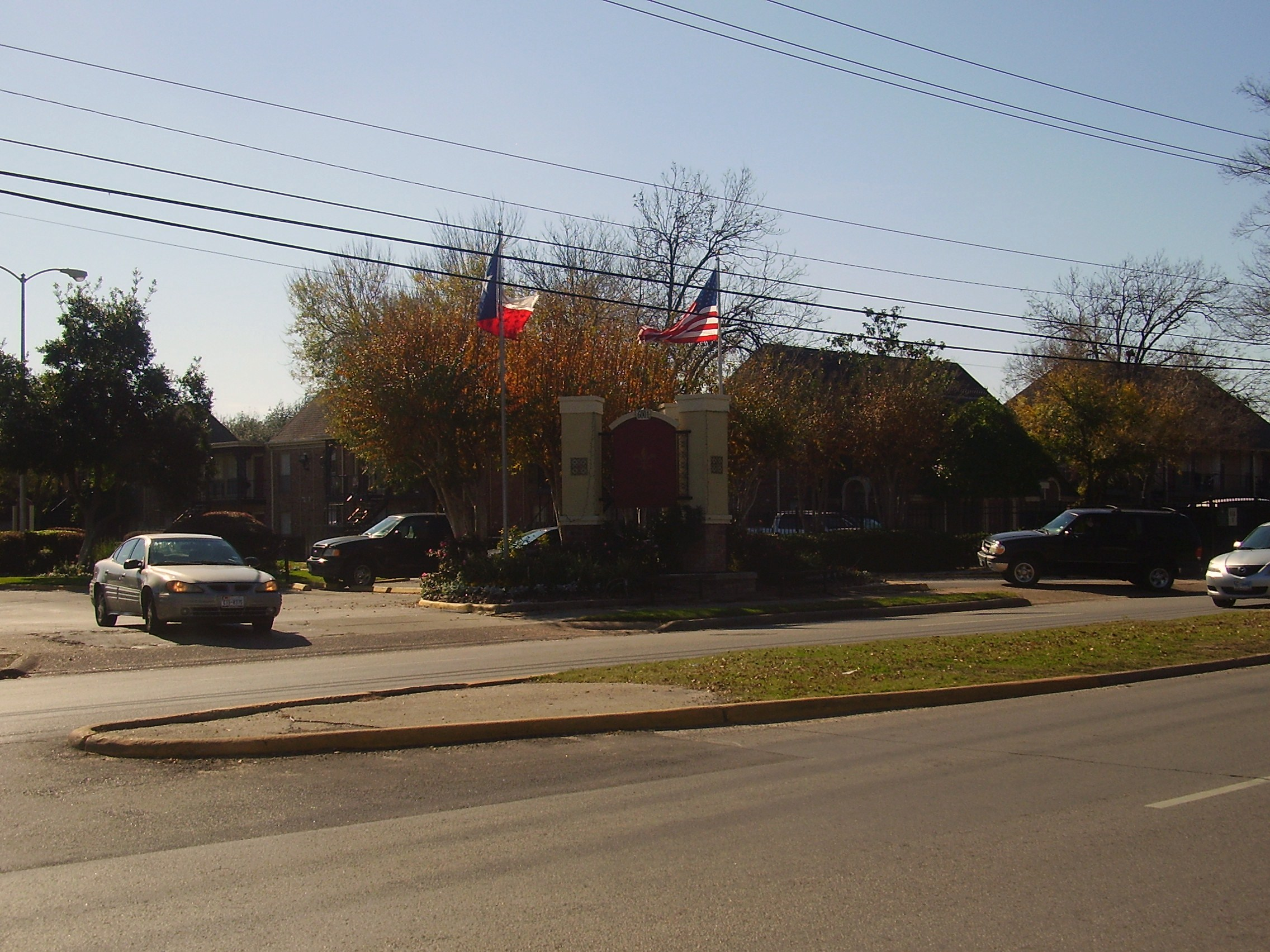
Many apartment complexes, such as Napoleon Square, were given names meant to evoke luxury

Before 1950, Gulfton consisted of farm land and much of the area belonged to Westmoreland Farms. In the mid-1950s, the Shenandoah subdivision was established; consisting of sixteen city blocks of ranch-style homes. Shenandoah was located adjacent to the land which would later become the site of the Gulfton apartment complexes. Decades later these communities would clash as the apartments surrounding Shenandoah deteriorated and property values became threatened.

Due to the large parcels of land available and the grid road pattern, Gulfton was well-suited for the construction of large apartment complexes. In the 1960s, a number of large apartment buildings were built. More complexes were added during the 1970s as Houston prospered from the oil boom. These apartments catered to young, predominantly Caucasian workers from the Rust Belt regions of the Northeastern and Midwestern United States employed in the burgeoning oil industry. Americans came from the South, the Midwest, New York, and California to live in the area of complexes. The complexes also housed some individuals from western and eastern Europe, Iran, Japan, Jordan, Lebanon, Saudi Arabia, Mexico, South America, Philippines, and Vietnam. Few native Houstonians lived in the housing complexes. The apartments were given names meant to be fancy, such as "Napoleon Square" and "Chateau Carmel." Some complexes gave free videocassette recorders to renters who signed leases for one year.

According to Jim Gaines, director of the Jesse H. Jones Center for Economic and Demographic Forecasting at Rice Center, a Rice University-affiliated urban research center, the development of these apartment complexes was not well planned or coordinated. There was often little interest in building a quality product as developers were primarily concerned with generating quick revenue and capitalizing on the deregulation of financial institutions, tax laws favoring apartment construction, inflation, and a housing shortage in the Houston metropolitan area.

=== 1980–1992 ===
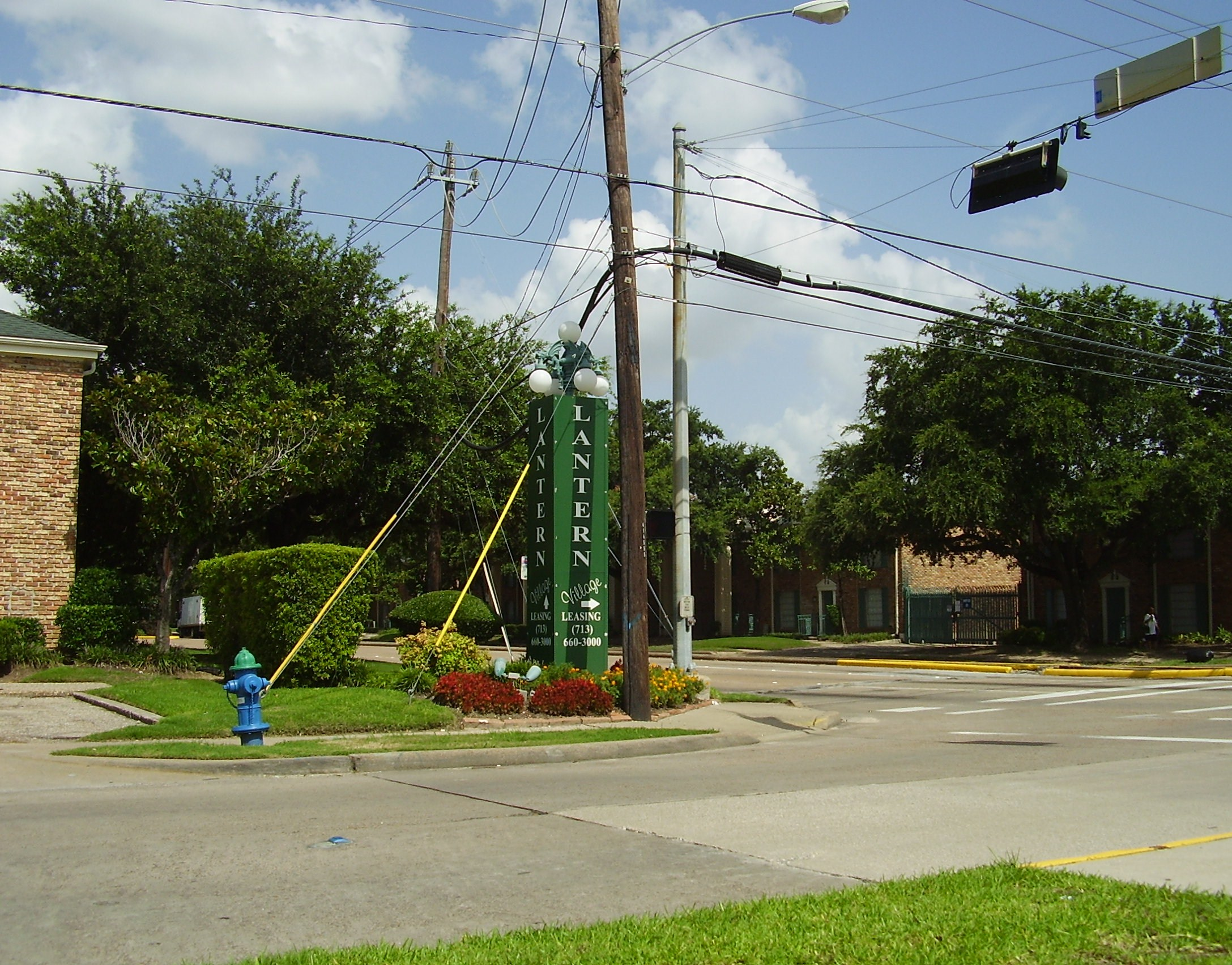
The Lantern Village Apartments, formerly Colonial House Apartments, became well-known through television advertisements before experiencing bankruptcy, foreclosure, and a name change

In the mid-1980s the Houston-area oil industry economy declined and more than 200,000 jobs were lost from the local economy. Thousands of renters left causing a rise in apartment vacancies. Many apartment complexes throughout the Houston area experienced bankruptcy, foreclosure, and frequent turnover in ownership. Colonial House Apartments, which became known throughout the Houston area from advertisements featuring California promoter Michael Pollack, is an example as they faced foreclosure. DRG Funding, a mortgage lender headquartered in Washington, DC, took over the complex. On September 16, 1988, the Government National Mortgage Association took over Colonial House Apartments and other properties of DRG, after DRG fell behind on its mortgage. On Wednesday, May 11, 1989, the Colonial House Apartments were auctioned off to an out-of-state investment group for $8.9 million and the U.S. Department of Housing and Urban Development realized a $42 million loss. The following year Colonial House was renamed "Lantern Village."

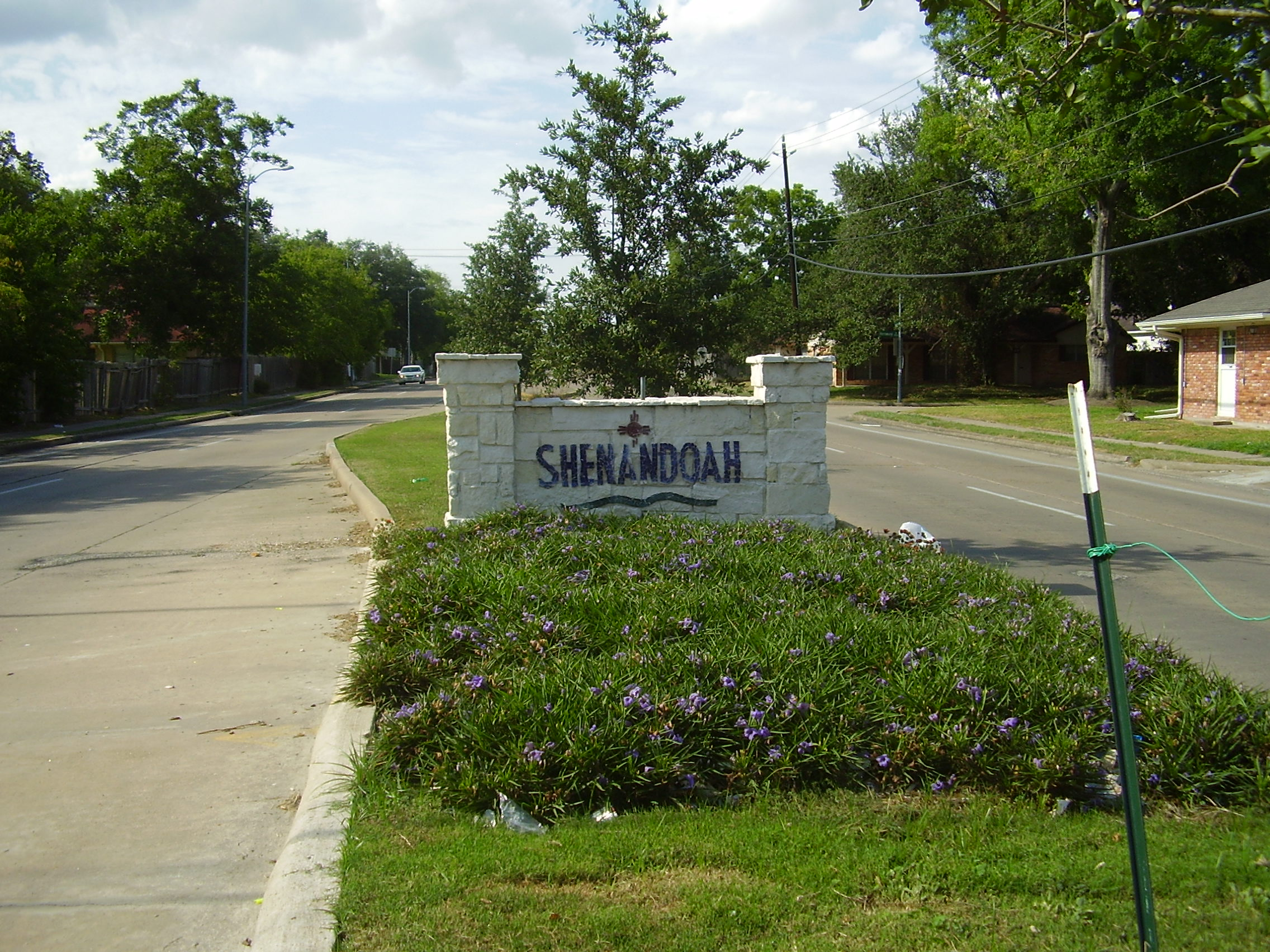
The community of Gulfton and the community of Shenandoah clashed after Gulfton's demographics changed

Marketing to an influx of immigrant workers, owners abandoned "adult only" policies (prohibiting children), listed vacancies in Spanish, and reduced rents. Despite the rent reduction, a July 17, 1988, Houston Chronicle article stated that rates for poorly maintained apartments in Gulfton and other Houston areas were comparable to well-maintained apartments in other parts of the city. According to Gaines, complexes in Gulfton began to cater to illegal immigrants and landlords allowed renters to "double-up" housing (several individuals and/or families living in a unit). John Goodner, a Houston city council member who represented a district that included Gulfton at that time, said that more demographic changes occurred within his district in the years leading up to 1988 than in any other part of the city. He was referring to the shift in the demographics of various apartment complexes. Goodner said that the complex owners were unconcerned about this development as long as the rent payments were made. Landlords had difficulty filling apartment complexes even if they did not require background checks. Many banks and lending institutions owned foreclosed apartments and failed to properly maintain them, considering it "pouring money down a perceived rat hole." Gaines added that many complexes deferred maintenance.

Many of the new Gulfton residents found limited access to government services such as food stamps and municipal and county health care. By July 1989, the Gulfton area was designated by Houston's city council as a "Community Development Target." These provided low-income communities with increased city services supplemented with federal funding. This drew a response from the Houston Resident Citizens Participation Council (HRCPC), a citizen commission that monitored funding for low-income residents. Board members formally protested city council against diverting support funds from the "old poor" in existing low-income areas to the "new poor" in newly created communities. The HRCPC members argued that the original "Community Development Targets" were not fully served prior to the service areas expanding and budgets shrinking. The council had no authority to force any changes in public policy. Rose Mary Garza, then the principal of Cunningham Elementary School, stated that some government officials were reluctant to expand services to Gulfton as they believed the low-income apartments would be bulldozed. During his time city council member Goodner lobbied for a satellite health department clinic for apartment renters.

Robert Fisher, professor and chair of Political Social Work at the Graduate School of Social Work at the University of Houston, and Lisa Taaffe, a project manager for Houston's "Communities in Schools," stated in "Public Life in Gulfton: Multiple Publics and Models of Organization," a 1997 article, that the development and decline of Gulfton originated from a, "purely short term, relatively spontaneous speculative process." They state that the process focused on building apartment complexes, clubs, and warehouses for short-term profit without providing supporting infrastructure such as parks, libraries, recreation centers, small blocks, and sidewalks.

In 1985, recent Salvadoran immigrants opened the Central American Refugee Center (CARECEN) to provide legal services for central American immigrants. Between 1988 and 1992 CARECEN cooperated with the Central American Refugee Committee (CARC) to publicize and advocate issues related to the Salvadoran Civil War and the immigration of Salvadorans to the United States. In 1988, various religious representatives created the Gulfton Area Religious Council (GARC) open for any Christian church to join. GARC advocated assistance for Gulfton residents and established focused programs. Taafe and Fisher suggest that GARC focused on relieving the symptoms of poverty instead of removing its causes. Representative Goodner, described as "conservative" by Fisher and Taafe, organized a March 3, 1989, town hall meeting which sparked the creation of an organization called the Gulfton Area Action Council (GAAC). The GAAC was made up of business owners who advocated the reduction of recreational drug use, local crime, and the improvement of the neighborhood, in an effort to restore property values.

In the late 1980s, the Southwest Houston Task Force was established as a coalition of representatives from the City of Houston government, health and human services organizations, businesses, schools, religious organizations, and Gulfton-area residents. The Task Force held two meetings related to the proposal for the establishment of a municipal health clinic in Gulfton. The organization's meetings led to the opening in 1991 of the Sisters of Charity Southwest Health Clinic, the Gulfton area's first major health clinic. Jointly operated by the GAAC and the City of Houston, the clinic provided pre-natal and child care services. Fisher and Taafe state that the organization "lost its focal issue" after the clinic opened. After performing a "community needs assessment" and identifying "local leaders", the organization disbanded in early 1992. During the same year the Salvadoran Civil War ended but CARECEN continued to provide legal services, publications, and advocacy for Central American immigrants. They also began campaigning the federal government to provide permanent legal residency to the Salvadoran refugees.

=== 1992–2009 ===
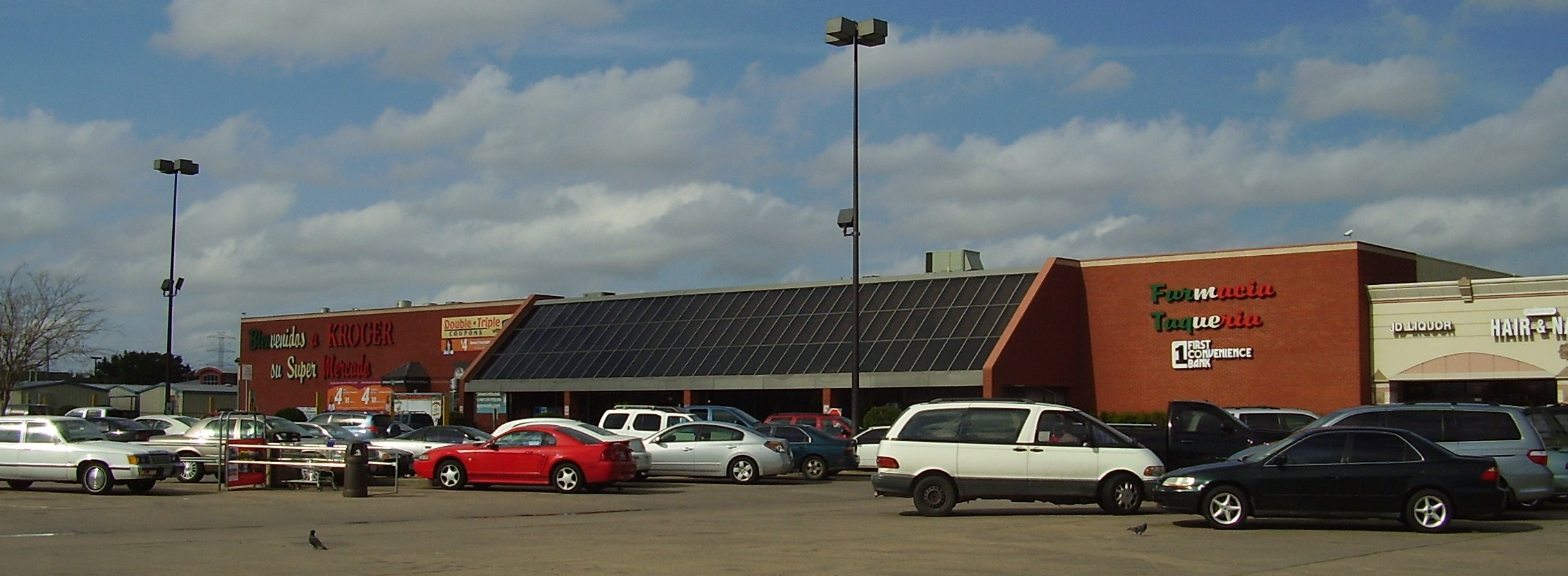
In 2003 Kroger remodeled this store, located in Gulfton, to appeal to Gulfton's immigrant population. This Kroger closed in 2011 and the building is now used by the SER-Niños Charter School.

In August 1992, Mike McMahon of the GAAC and Francisco Lopez of CARECEN founded the Gulfton Area Neighborhood Organization (GANO). In 1995, CARECEN merged with GANO as both organizations had board members and goals in common. Fisher and Taafe said in the 1997 article Public Life in Gulfton: Multiple Publics and Models of Organization that the merger into GANO made cooperation between the members of the combined "progressive" GANO and Shenandoah Civic Association with the more "conservative" GAAC unlikely. By 1993, Gulfton received 500 new street lights, paved streets, and new sidewalks as part of the City of Houston's "Neighborhoods to Standard" program.

In 1997, Gulfton received a federal designation as a National Weed & Seed site from OJJDP and TDPRS designation which provided the community with close to $7 million in grant funding that would target criminal activity while providing social services for at-risk youth and families in the 77081 zip code. Nyelene Qasem, Gulfton Weed & Seed Coordinator, established the Gulfton Community Learning Center, Campo del Sol Summer Day Camp Program, the Campo del Sol After School Program and the Gulfton Education Center, in strategically located areas of Gulfton in an attempt to provide ESL classes, Citizenship classes, gang intervention, apartment outreach/community policing efforts and Computer classes-all free of charge, to any resident interested in attending. From 1999–2004, the Gulfton Community Learning Center and the Gulfton Education Center provided free computer classes to over 800 community residents. From 1998-2004, more than 3,000 children between the ages of 6 and 18 attended the free summer day camp offered at Burnett Bayland Park. The Campo del Sol After School program provided teens from Jane Long Middle School after school enrichment programming and TAKS tutorials from 3:00 p.m. to 6:00 p.m. Many of the collaborative efforts were noted by the Houston Chronicle, Telemundo, PBS, La Voz and smaller newspapers from the area.

On July 11, 1998, Houston Police Department officers acting on a tip regarding drug-related activities entered a Gulfton apartment complex and shot and killed Pedro Oregon Navarro. The circumstances of the event were disputed. By October 19 of that year, a Harris County grand jury cleared the officers of charges related to the incident. Nestor Rodriguez, a professor of sociology at the University of Houston, described Gulfton as "a place where people are just struggling to get by." Consequently, there were fewer "displays of outrage" than would have been expected if the incident had occurred in one of the "older, well-established Latino communities." Oregon's killing was controversial because illicit drugs were not found on the property. Oregon's family sued the City of Houston arguing that the raid was inappropriate. The city countered that its officers acted in an appropriate manner. A federal judge dismissed the lawsuit in 2000.

Beatrice Marquez, a Houston Independent School District (HISD) parent involvement specialist for the Gulfton area, stated in a 2004 Education Week article that members of the Central American communities specifically identify themselves with Gulfton rather than Houston.

=== 2020 ===
In the COVID-19 pandemic as of July 31, 2020, 13 people in Gulfton died and authorities confirmed that 1,100 had been infected with COVID-19. Rose-Ann Aragon of KPRC-TV wrote that the pandemic "hit Gulfton hard".

== Geography ==
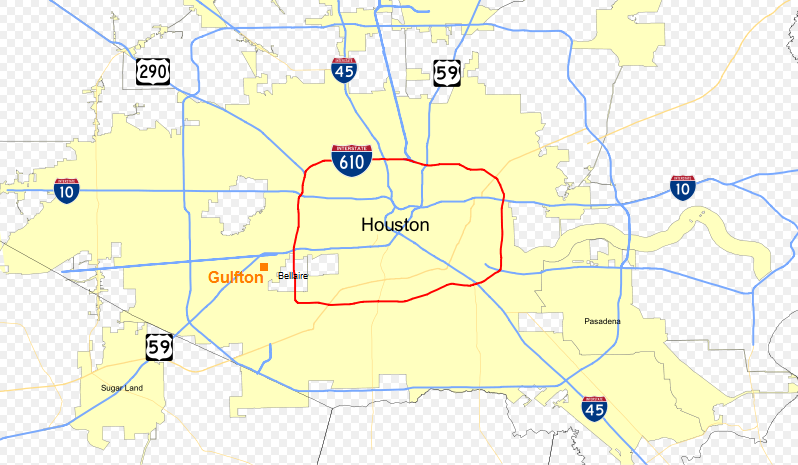
Location of Gulfton in the City of Houston

Gulfton is located in Southwest Houston outside the 610 Loop. Gulfton is about 10 mi (16.1 km) southwest of Downtown Houston and approximately 2 mi (3.2 km) west of Bellaire. Susan Rogers of the Rice Design Alliance describes Gulfton is an example of an "inner ring" area of Greater Houston which is located between downtown and the suburbs. Rogers states that the "outwardly conventional landscapes" of "inner ring" areas are "neither urban nor suburban, but a conglomeration of both, a hybrid condition mixed from one part global city, one part garden suburb, and one part disinvestment."

Gulfton includes about 90 apartment complexes with more than 15,000 units. Lori Rodriguez of the Houston Chronicle said that Gulfton, "with its rows of down-at-the-heels apartments that still bear jaunty names from their swinging-singles days, makes an incongruous gateway for the newest waves of immigrants and their many children." Roberto Suro of The Washington Post described Gulfton as a "tightly packed warren." Some of the apartment complexes are over one block long. In the 1970s one of the apartment complexes contained seventeen swimming pools, seventeen hot tubs, seventeen laundry rooms, and two club houses. Gulfton also contains strip malls and office blocks. The complexes generally contain features catering to single adults and lack features appreciated by families, due to the initial market targeted in the 1970s. As of 2005, Gulfton has more than one hundred semi-private swimming pools but many of them have been filled in and are no longer usable. Some apartments in Gulfton have businesses located in ground floor units. Several area tract houses are occupied by beauty salons, small stores, and tire repair shops. Rogers contends that the mixed-use adaptation, "has occurred spontaneously from the bottom up, indicative of the entrepreneurial spirit of residents and their need to adapt existing space for new uses." A 2000s City of Houston report on Study Area 8, which includes Gulfton and surrounding areas, states that Gulfton's "large apartment complexes dominate the area's landscape." John Nova Lomax of the Houston Press described Gulfton as "uglier" than a group of apartment complexes along Broadway Street in eastern Houston.

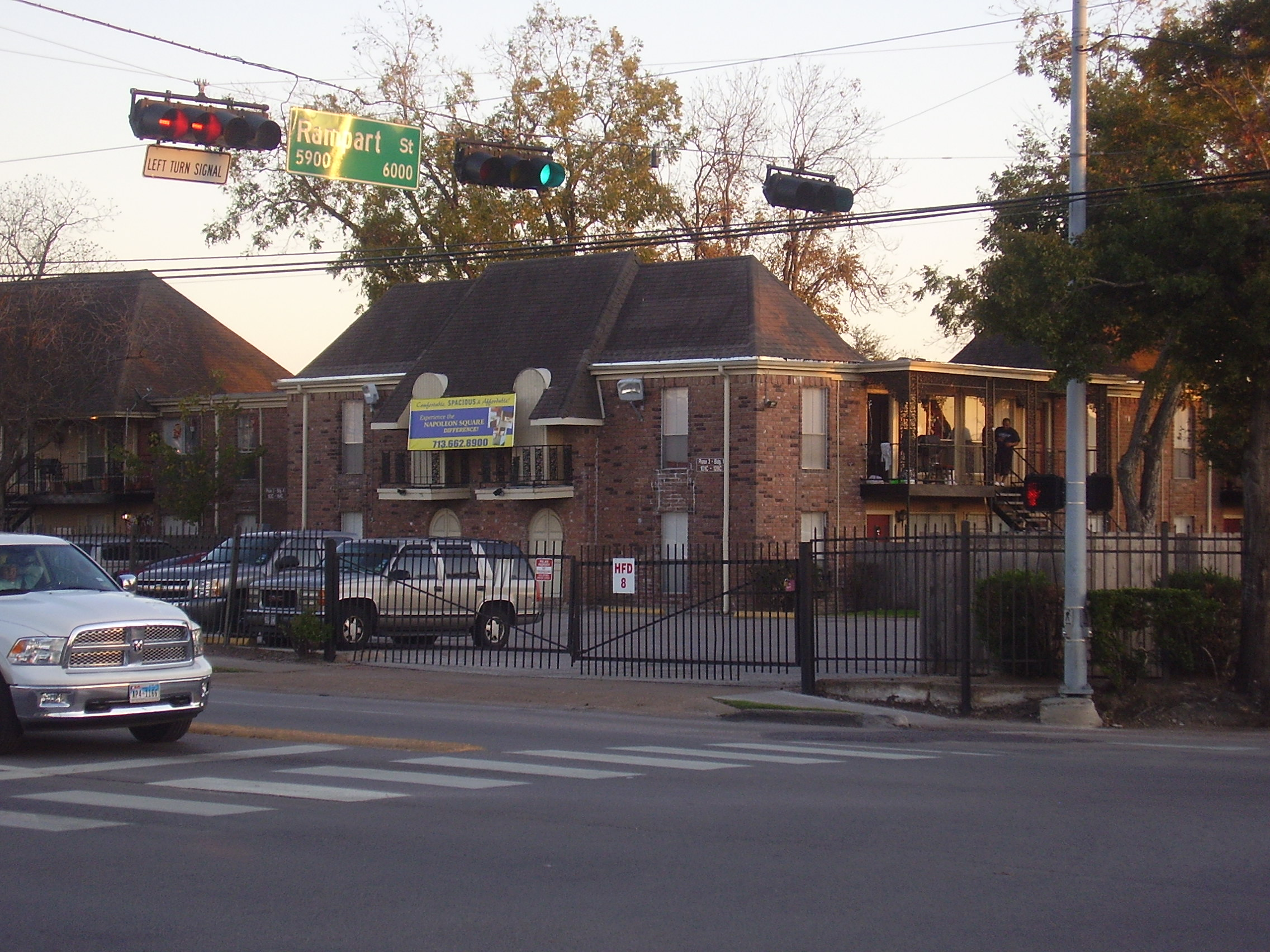
Napoleon Square, one of Gulfton's apartment complexes, once had a club, a disco, and multiple swimming pools

The size of the city blocks in Gulfton differs significantly from that of Downtown Houston in that sixteen downtown city blocks will fit into one Gulfton block. Few sidewalks exist in Gulfton. In 1999 Houston City Council District F representative Ray Discroll said "[Gulfton residents] don't have sidewalks, let alone sidewalks that are only two and a half feet wide. There are pregnant women walking down the sides of the roads." In 2005 the Houston-Galveston Area Council identified Gulfton as one of the most hazardous communities for pedestrians. Dug Begley of the Chronicle wrote in 2019 that "pedestrians and cyclists, [sic] navigate streets designed for cars that can leave residents facing wide intersections with fast, unimpeded right turns and signal timing that forces younger, elderly and disabled travelers to hustle, as hundreds of cars pass by." That year the organization Together for Safer Roads planned to fund a study on Hillcroft Road, discussing ways of making pedestrians there safer, with $150,000; it plans to work with the municipal government.

One complex, Napoleon Square, was built in 1971 for $22 million; the 1,884 unit complex, owned by real estate figure Harold Farb, included a $400,000 disco and many swimming pools. In 1977 it had a main swimming pool, twelve other swimming pools, and a club called "Bonaparte's Retreat." Within a 1-mile (1.6 km) radius of the main entrance to Napoleon Square, 5,000 apartment units in at least twelve apartment facilities, about forty swimming pools, about or more than twenty-four bars and nightclubs, and about twelve tennis courts. A subsidiary of Western Capital purchased the complex in March 1985. As of 1999, about 1,500 families reside in the complex, and most of them originated from Mexico, Central America, and South America. As of 2003 many families at Napoleon Square came from Mexico, Honduras, other Central American countries, and South America. The Napoleon Square and Lantern Village complexes have a combined total of over 1,000 units and, as of 2000, several thousand inhabitants.

== Demographics ==
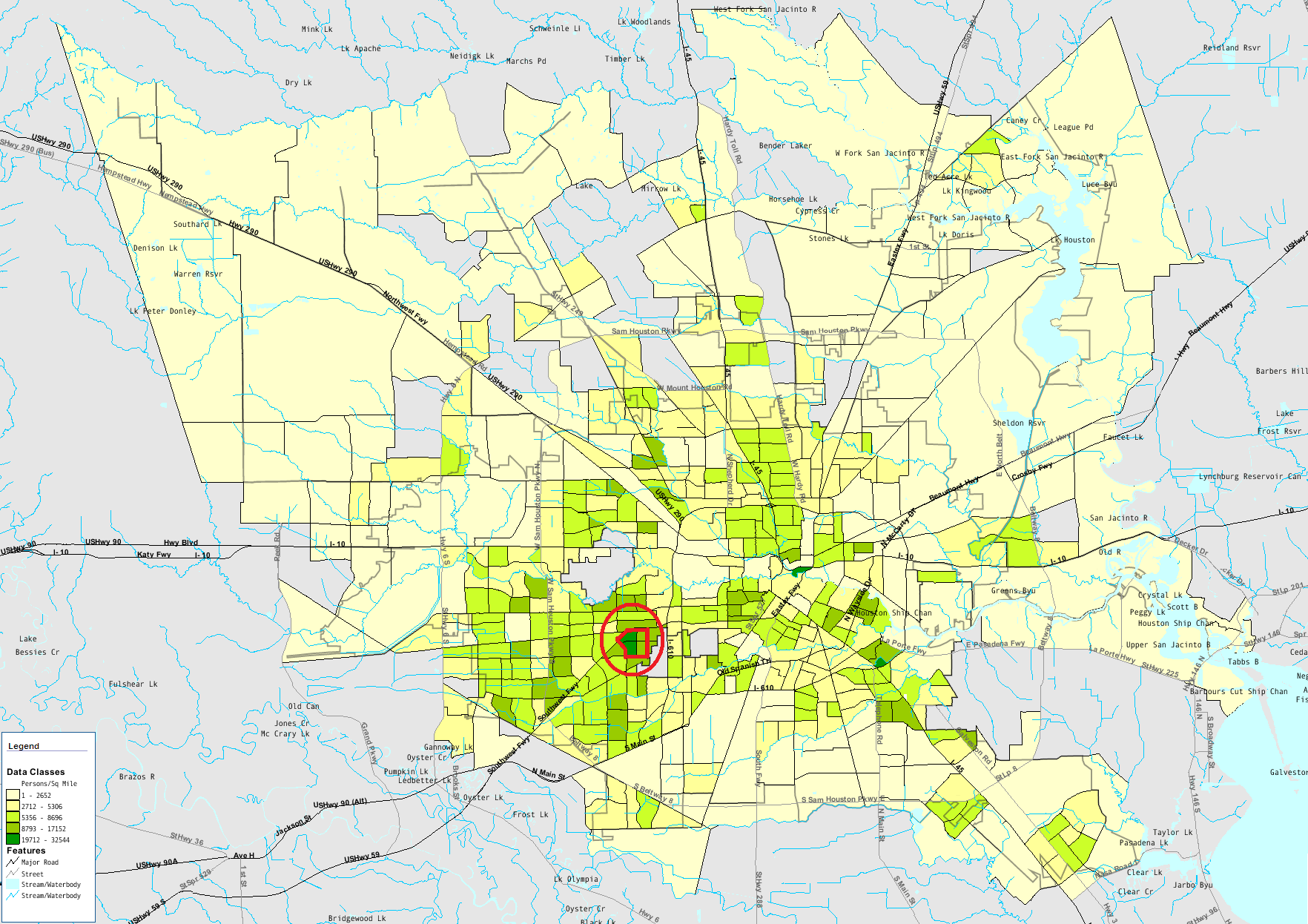
A map of Houston's population densities by census tract in 2000, with the census tract of western indicating the highest density range. Superneighborhood 27: A Brief History of Change identifies the area bound by a red line as the center of the Gulfton area.

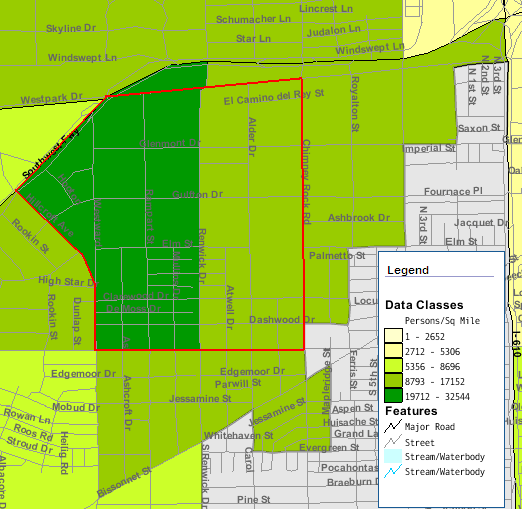
Close-up view of the Gulfton area's density rates by census tract (2000 census).

Between 1980 and 2000 the population of Gulfton increased by almost 100% without significant additional residences built. Between the 1990 U.S. census and the 2000 Census, the counted Hispanic population in Gulfton increased from 18,422 to 33,424, an 81% increase, and the non-Hispanic White population decreased from 6,371 to 4,908, a 23% loss. Occupancy rates at many apartment complexes increased; for instance, Napoleon Square's rate increased from 60% around 1996 to over 95% in 2001. Mike McMahon, the co-founder of the Gulfton Area Neighborhood Organization (GANO), said that increased census worker efforts to ensure a more accurate population count may have also contributed to the increase.

=== 2020s ===
In 2021 about 12% of households in Gulfton did not have cars, while the Houston average was around 6%.

=== 2010s ===
In 2015 the City of Houston-defined Gulfton Super Neighborhood #27, which includes Gulfton and various surrounding subdivisions, had 41,089 residents, with 14,508 people per square mile. 73% were Hispanic or Latino, 15% were non-Hispanic black, 7% were non-Hispanic white, 6% were non-Hispanic Asians, and 2% were non-Hispanic others. In 2020 Hispanics and Latinos made up about 69% of the residents, the median income was $26,042, and the average life expectancy of Gulfton was about 75.9. Of the residents, 95% rented their residences. Rose-Ann Aragon of KPRC-TV wrote that "The culture of the neighborhood is rich but it’s [sic] dwindling in economic wealth."

=== 2000s ===
By 2005, 60% of Gulfton residents were not native born and represented citizenship from forty-two countries. Many residents were illegal immigrants. More than 20% of the households did not own cars. Starting in the mid-1980s, the Gulfton population experienced increases in female and children populations. Peg Purser, an urban planner who directed a 1991 University of Houston Center for Public Policy study commissioned by the Houston Chronicle, identified that the Hispanic population growth in the Gulfton area was almost entirely from Central American countries. According to the study, between the 1980 and 1990 U.S. Censuses, Hispanic population density increased by 3,500 persons per square mile. Between 1990 and 2000, the population of the area within the Gulfton Super Neighborhood increased by 13,347, from 33,022 residents to 46,369 residents or 40%.

The 2000 census identifies Gulfton as a "hard to enumerate" tract with the densest neighborhood in the City of Houston, estimated at 45,000 people in approximately 3 square miles (7.8 km^{2}). Some community leaders believed that the actual population was closer to 70,000. In a 2006 National Center for School Engagement report, Susana Herrera, the program coordinator for Houston's Truancy Reduction Demonstration Project, indicated that social service agencies and government officials estimated Gulfton's population to be 60,000, with 20,000 juveniles. Under-representation in the census was likely as many of the area's immigrants, especially those residing in the country illegally, may have been distrustful of the government's attempt to obtain personal information. Jaime de la Isla, the assistant superintendent of the Houston Independent School District, said in 2000 that it was possible that the district lost significant amounts of money because residents of Gulfton were not counted in the 1990 United States census, and that the district receives federal funds for bilingual programs, free and reduced lunch, and special education based on numbers in the U.S. census. Steve Murdock, a demographer for the state of Texas, said that "[t]he major problem in an undercount is not an immigration issue. It's always difficult to count any population that is highly mobile, poor and living in a diversity of households."

As of 2003, 31% of residents in Gulfton had an annual income of less than $15,000 ($26252.71 in today's money). By January 30, 2007, some 45% of the families included small children. By that same date, many Gulfton families earned less than $25,000 U.S. dollars ($38818.01 in today's money) per year and were dependent on public assistance. By 2006, the median family income in Gulfton was $18,733 ($29917.76 in today's money) or 30% less than the city of Houston's median income level.

By 2000, many Gulfton residents had recently immigrated from Mexico or other Latin American countries. In 2000 the super neighborhood reported a population of 46,369 people, of whom 34,410 (74%) were Hispanic, 5,029 were white, 4,047 were black, 2,081 were Asian, 61 were Native American, 13 were Native Hawaiian, and 97 were of other races and were not Hispanic. 631 were of two or more races. As of 2010, Gulfton has citizens of 82 countries, and 16 languages are spoken in the community. Gulfton had a density of 16,000 people per square mile, while as a whole the area within the 610 Loop has a density of 3,800 people per square mile.

Of the 32,298 reported residents older than 18, 22,941 (71%) were Hispanic, 4,064 were non-Hispanic white, 2,980 were black, 1,715 were Asian, 38 were Native American, 10 were Native Hawaiian, and 65 were of other races and were not Hispanic. 485 were of two or more races.

The super neighborhood contained 17,467 housing units, with 15,659 occupied units, 14,865 rental units, and 794 owner units. Super Neighborhood #27 had 9,930 families with 36,019 individuals counted in the census. The super neighborhood's average family size was 3.63, compared with a city average of 3.39.

The St. Luke's Episcopal Health Charities 2007 Community Health Report on Gulfton, which includes some areas north of Gulfton, notes the U.S. Census reported the area to have 60,637 people in 2000. Since 1990, that area's population has increased by 16,000 people (over 26%) and the area's Hispanic population increased by nearly 16%. In a twenty-year span ending in 2000, the non-Hispanic white population decreased by 50%. In 1980 only about 15% of the area population consisted of children, by 2000 that had risen to nearly 30% of the population.

== Government ==
=== Local government ===
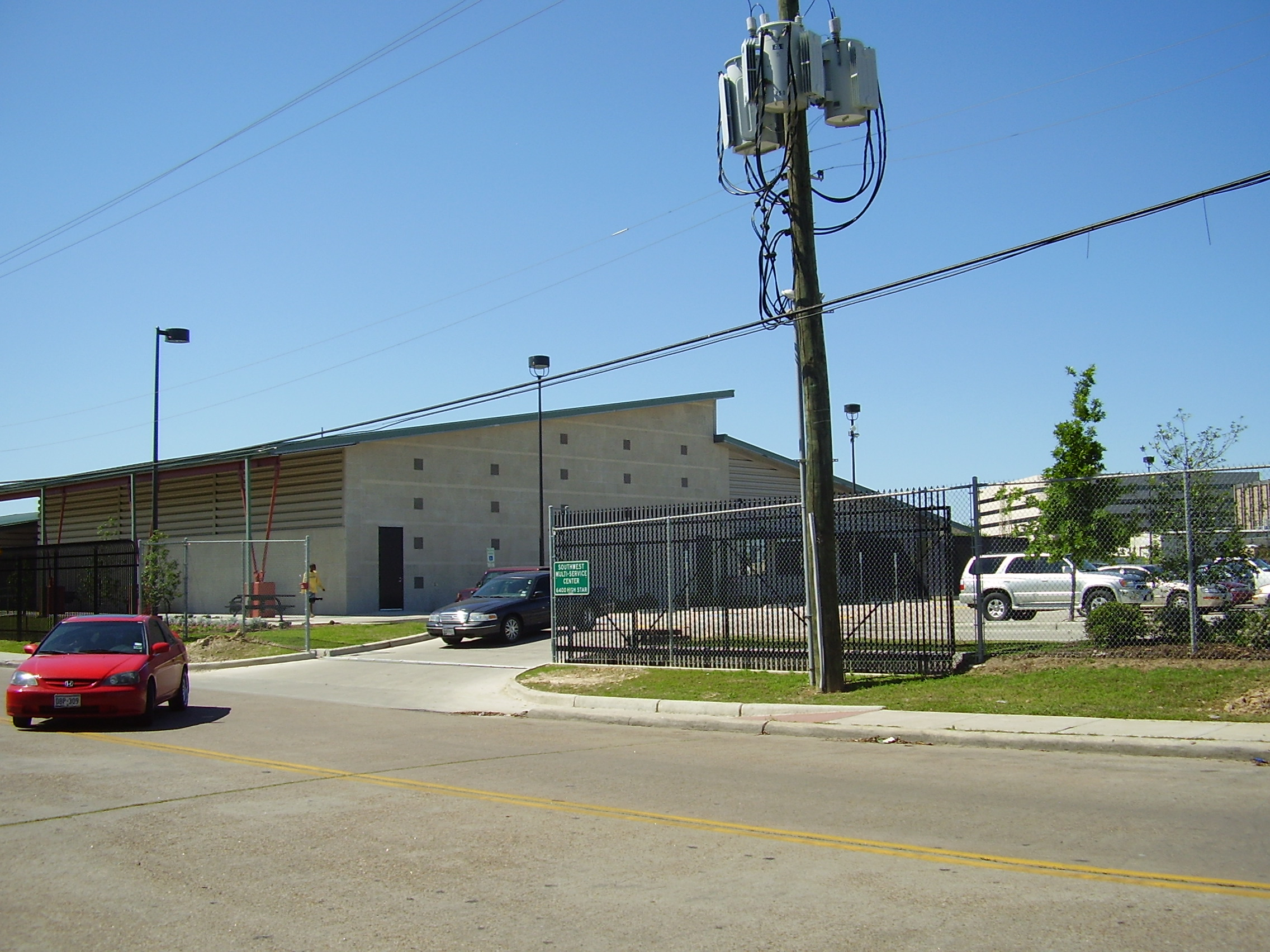
Southwest Multi-Service Center

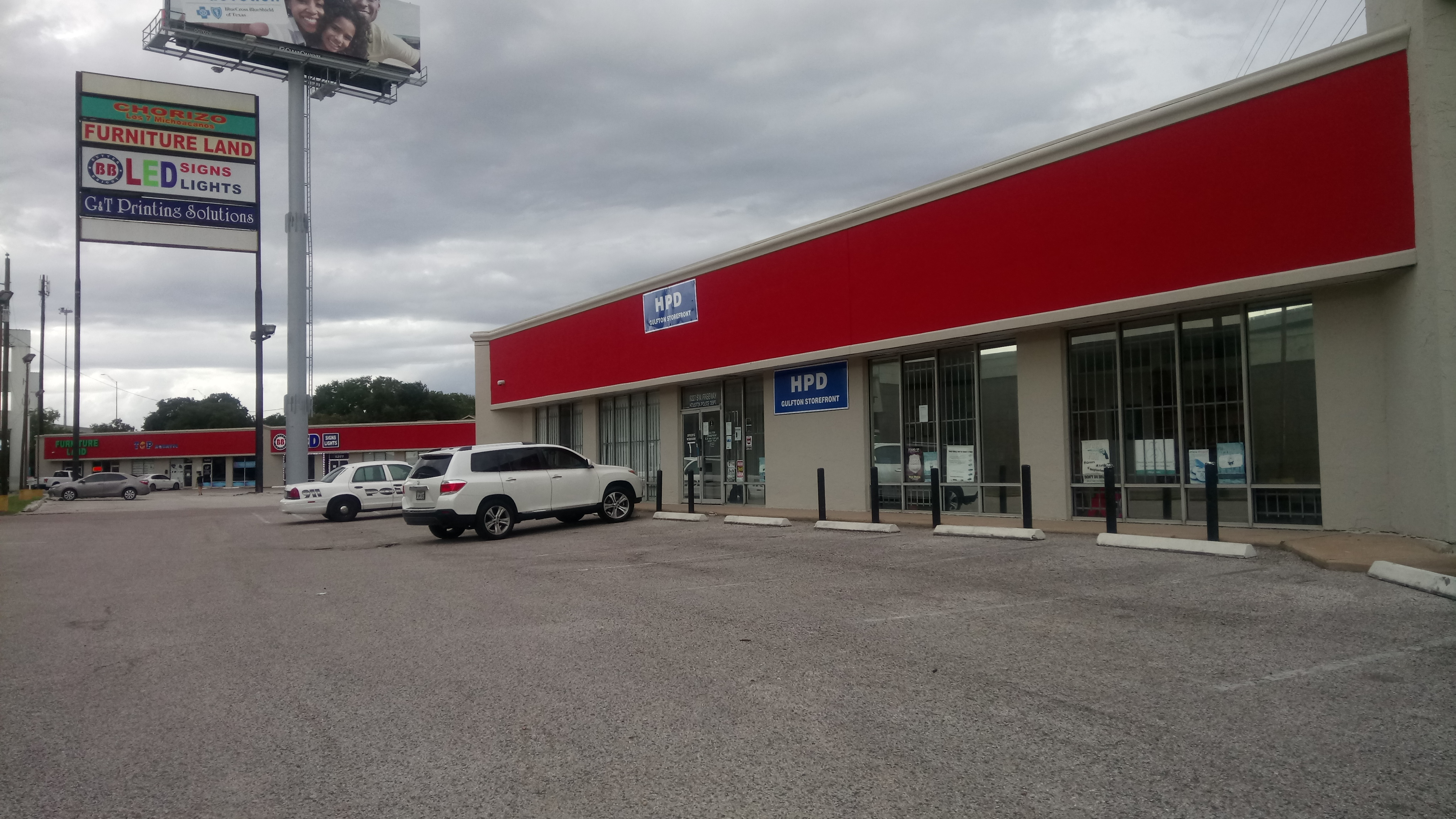
Current Houston Police Department Gulfton Storefront

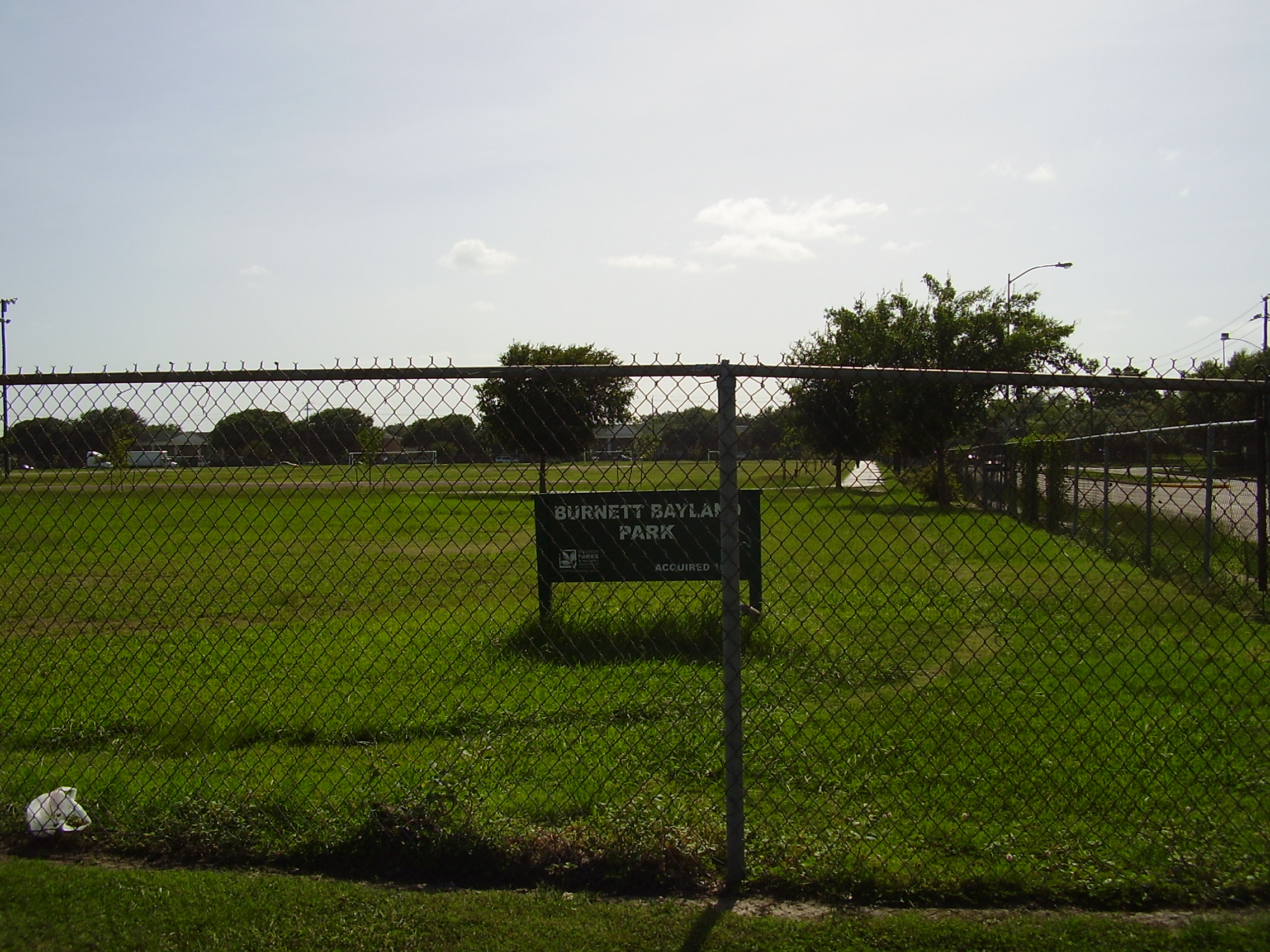
Burnett Bayland Park

Gulfton is served by the Houston Police Department's South Gessner Division (previously Fondren Patrol Division). Previously the Gulfton area was served by the Southwest Patrol division, then headquartered on Beechnut Street. A June 1999 report entitled the Gulfton Community Five Year Plan, produced by the Office of Juvenile Justice and Delinquency Prevention, stated that the sudden changes in Gulfton's population exceeded the police department's ability to adapt. The establishment of the Gulfton Storefront Station augmented the police department's presence in Gulfton. This station, originally located near the Napoleon Square Apartments, opened in the summer of 1990 with the City of Houston paying one dollar a month to the real estate company managing the complex. The Gulfton Area Action Council paid the utility bills, estimated at $5,000 per month in 1990. The Civic Association of Shenandoah also provides support for the establishment of the sub-station. By 1998 the Fondren Patrol division was established with responsibility for the area. The storefront moved to its current location in 2017.

The Houston Fire Department provides fire protection services. Its Fire District 68 Primary Run Area covers Gulfton and is located near Fire Station 51 Sharpstown, a part of Fire District 68. The community is within Super Neighborhood #27 Gulfton and its recognized council was established on June 22, 2000. Each super neighborhood represents a community advocacy block of civic clubs, places of worship, businesses, and other community interests.

Houston City Council District J now covers Gulfton. District J was created in 2011 to allow Hispanic voters to more easily select candidates who cater to them. Robert Jara, a political consultant of the group Campaign Strategies, drew the boundaries of District J in order to ensure that Gulfton and Sharpstown were together in one area. That way, the Hispanic residents could lobby for influence with their city council representative, whether he or she is of Hispanic origin or not.

In the 2000s Gulfton was divided between two city council districts, District C and District F, while in the 1990s all of Gulfton was in district F. By December 3, 1991, increased crime and demographic shifts in southwestern Houston neighborhoods led to many political rivals competing for the city council seat of District F.

The City of Houston operates the Southwest Multi-Service Center within the Southwest Management District (formerly the Greater Sharpstown district), adjacent to Gulfton. The city's multi-service centers provide child care, elderly residents programs, and rental space. The complex includes the Houston Public Library (HPL) Express Southwest library extension. The center also houses the Mayor's Office for Immigrant and Refugee Affairs and the Mayor's Citizens' Assistance Office (CAO) Southwest Satellite Office. Construction of the center was scheduled to begin in February 2005. The Mayor of Houston, Bill White and Council Member Khan dedicated the center on Monday February 19, 2007, which cost an estimated $4.1 million (2007 rates).

Harris County Precinct Four operates the Burnett Bayland Park and Burnett Bayland Community Center in Gulfton. The complex has an outdoor basketball court, a hike and bicycle trail, a playground, a lighted athletics field, and a water park. No recreation centers existed in Gulfton prior to the opening of Burnett Bayland. In 1995 Mike McMahon, executive director of Gulfton Area Neighborhood Association (GANO), criticized the city for not establishing any libraries, multi-service centers, parks, or recreation centers in Gulfton. However, through the collaborative effort of Gulfton Weed & Seed and Gulfton Youth Development, members of the Gulfton Youth Leadership Council attended Superneighborhoood meetings to lobby for an enclosed area at Burnett Bayland Park, where many of the youth attended Campo del Sol or soccer games; they also lobbied for a multi-purpose center to be established to assist all members of the Gulfton area. Through their efforts, money was allocated for Burnett Bayland to be rebuilt with an enclosed community center as well as money being allocated for a multipurpose center to be built. Many of these youngsters were previously gang involved youth who were headed to a juvenile delinquency center prior to their involvement with Weed & Seed and Gulfton Youth Development. Many of the participants graduated from high school and many began taking classes at HCC, something many never thought possible at the time.

=== County representation ===
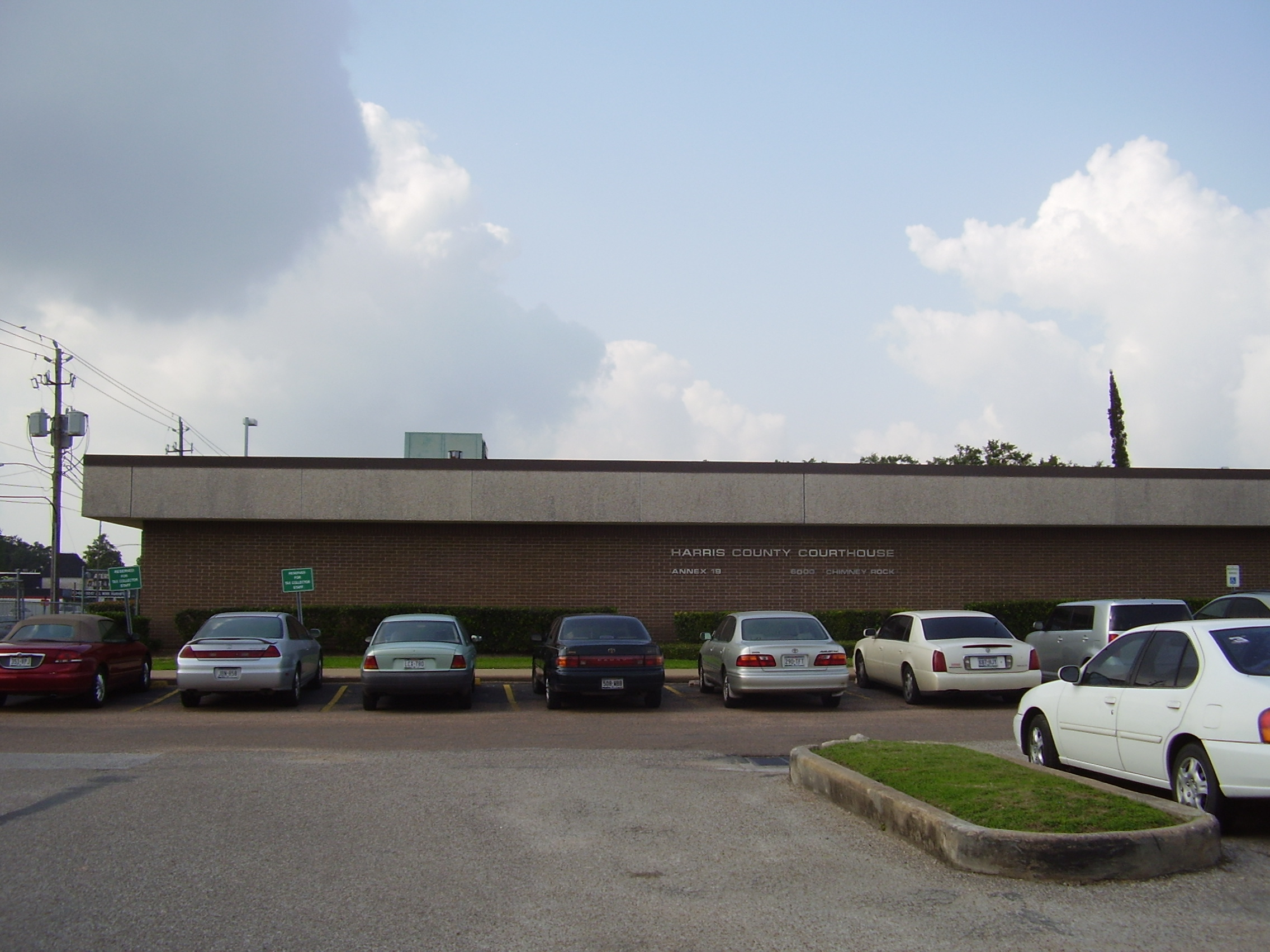
Harris County Courthouse Annex 19

Harris County Precinct Four serves Gulfton, while Harris County Constable Precinct Five and Constable Precinct One also provide services.

The County has offices in Gulfton and provides the Bellaire Tax Office Branch and the Harris County Youth Services Center services. The Harris County Child Protective Services (CPS) operates the TRIAD program from this center aimed at preventing juvenile crime. One of their programs focused on decreasing juvenile crime is the Gulfton Youth Development Program which operates out of the Gulfton Community Learning Center at 5982 Renwick Drive. The Southwest Courthouse Annex 19 is located at the county complex. The Harris Health System operates the Vallbona Health Center (formerly People's Health Center) near Gulfton. The Harris County Juvenile Probation Department runs the Burnett-Bayland Reception Center and the Burnett-Bayland Home, residential post-adjudication facilities for youth. The Reception Center opened in 1998 with revenue from the Texas Juvenile Probation Commission state grants and county funds. The Burnett Bayland Home is a 40-acre (16 ha) campus for juvenile offenders who do not require secure confinement.

=== State and federal representation ===
Gulfton is located in District 137 of the Texas House of Representatives and represented by Gene Wu since 2013. Gulfton is within District 17 of the Texas Senate and represented by Joan Huffman since 2009. In May 1991, Marc Campos of the Southwest Voter Registration Education Project, expressed concerns that proposed state senate redistricting plans would deliberately re-draw Texas Senate, District 15 to ensure the re-election of John Whitmire. He felt this would hamper the possible election of Hispanic representatives. Campos cited the inclusion of Gulfton in Whitmire's district would dilute Hispanic voting strength, since many Gulfton residents are not eligible to vote due to a lack of citizenship. A May 15, 1991 Houston Chronicle article reported that some people did not want to see Gulfton included in a mostly Hispanic Texas Senate district citing fears that the residents might not vote. During the afternoon of May 1, 2010, 7,000 people protested Arizona's SB 1070 bill along Bellaire Boulevard and Chimney Rock in Gulfton.

Gulfton is in Texas's 9th congressional district and represented by Al Green since 2009. The United States Postal Service operates four offices near Gulfton: the De Moss Post Office, the Rich Hill Post Office, the Bellaire Post Office (in the City of Bellaire), and the Sage Post Office.

=== Foreign delegations ===
The Consulate-General of Nicaragua in Houston was located in Suite 470 at 6300 Hillcroft Avenue, adjacent to Gulfton. In 2009 the office moved and no longer resides in the Gulfton area.

== Transportation ==
Metropolitan Transit Authority of Harris County, Texas (METRO) operates passenger bus services in Gulfton. Bus lines serving the area include 2 Bellaire, 9 Gulfton/Holman, 32 Renwick/San Felipe, 33 Post Oak, 47 Hillcroft, 49 Chimney Rock/South Post Oak and 65 Bissonnet. The Gulfton Area Neighborhood Organization successfully lobbied for increased METRO bus routes in Gulfton. In 2019 Begley stated that "Gulfton remains the portion of [METRO's] service area with the greatest demand for bus service."

In 2021 METRO had plans to begin a circulator service around Gulfton to service families without cars and to compensate for long distances between landmarks. At the same time the city planned to give more room to pedestrians on Hillcroft Avenue by removing one lane of traffic.

As part of the METRORail light rail network, METRO proposed the University Line, an approximately ten-mile segment connecting Hillcroft Transit Center to the Eastwood Transit Center. In a 2007 Houston Chronicle questions and answers page regarding the proposed line, Daphne Scarbrough and Christof Spieler asked why METRO did not include a station to serve Gulfton. METRO responded that the agency originally envisioned "more of an express" line, but would examine the possibility of serving Gulfton on the University Line. In July 2008, METRO indicated a "Gulfton Station" as a "potential" station on the University Line in its modified Locally Preferred Alternative (LPA) plan. As of 2010 METRO has proposed the construction of a Gulfton Station as part of the University Line.

== Economy ==
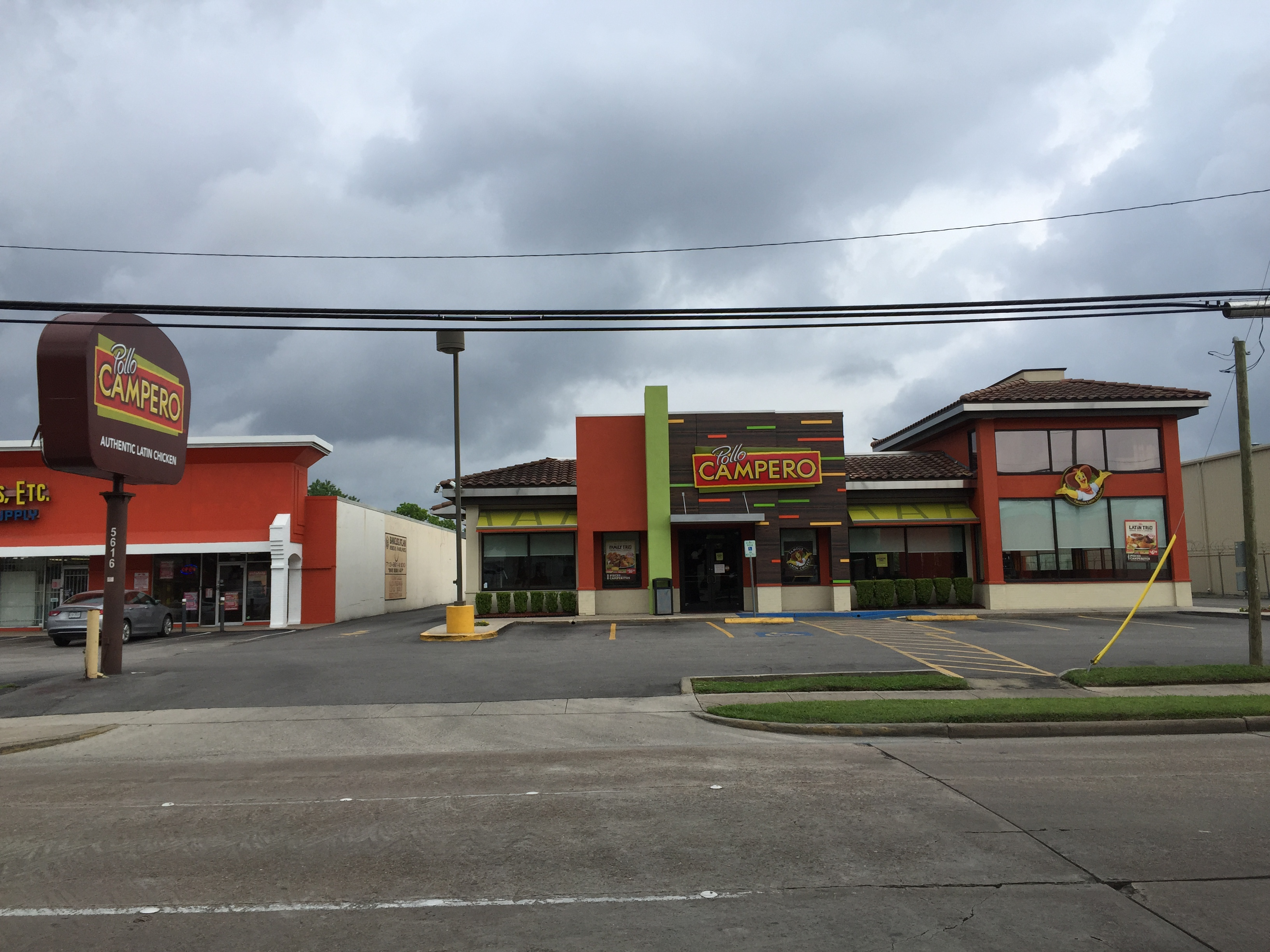
Pollo Campero Bellaire, a Pollo Campero restaurant in Gulfton

Gulfton includes several scattered areas of commercial and light industrial properties. Gulfton gained a large number of immigrants in the mid-1980s and the regional economy could not support the increasing pressure of the new workers. This led to higher unemployment rates and families tended to "double-up" housing, where multiple families shared the same unit to reduce family expenditures. Scott Van Beck, head of the Houston Independent School District's West Region in the Gulfton area, stated in a 2006 keynote address to the Rotary Club of Bellaire, "When I look out my window on Chimney Rock, I don't see big corporations; I see Gulfton; I see mom and pop businesses." The Houston Metropolitan Chamber, previously the Greater Southwest Houston Chamber of Commerce, provides economic assistance in Gulfton. As of 2005 many Central American businesses have outlets in Gulfton. ADOC footwear has its only United States store located in Gulfton. Pollo Campero has the Bellaire location in Gulfton. Salvadoran banks have three branches and an importing business in the area. As of 2004 the Salvadoran banks include Banagricola (a U.S. division of Banco Agricola), BancoSal (a subsidiary of HSBC El Salvador) and Bancomercio. At that time many businesses in Gulfton, including small grocery stores and restaurants, were owned and operated by Salvadoran refugees from the Salvadoran Civil War. Grupo TACA operates the Houston-area TACA Center on Bellaire Boulevard in the Gulfton area. Additionally, Famsa, a Mexican appliance and furniture chain, operates the #38 Bellaire location in the Southwest Management District, adjacent to Gulfton. Throughout the neighborhood food vendors, called paleteros, travel on bicycles and sell foods and snacks such as spiced cucumbers and popsicles (paletas).

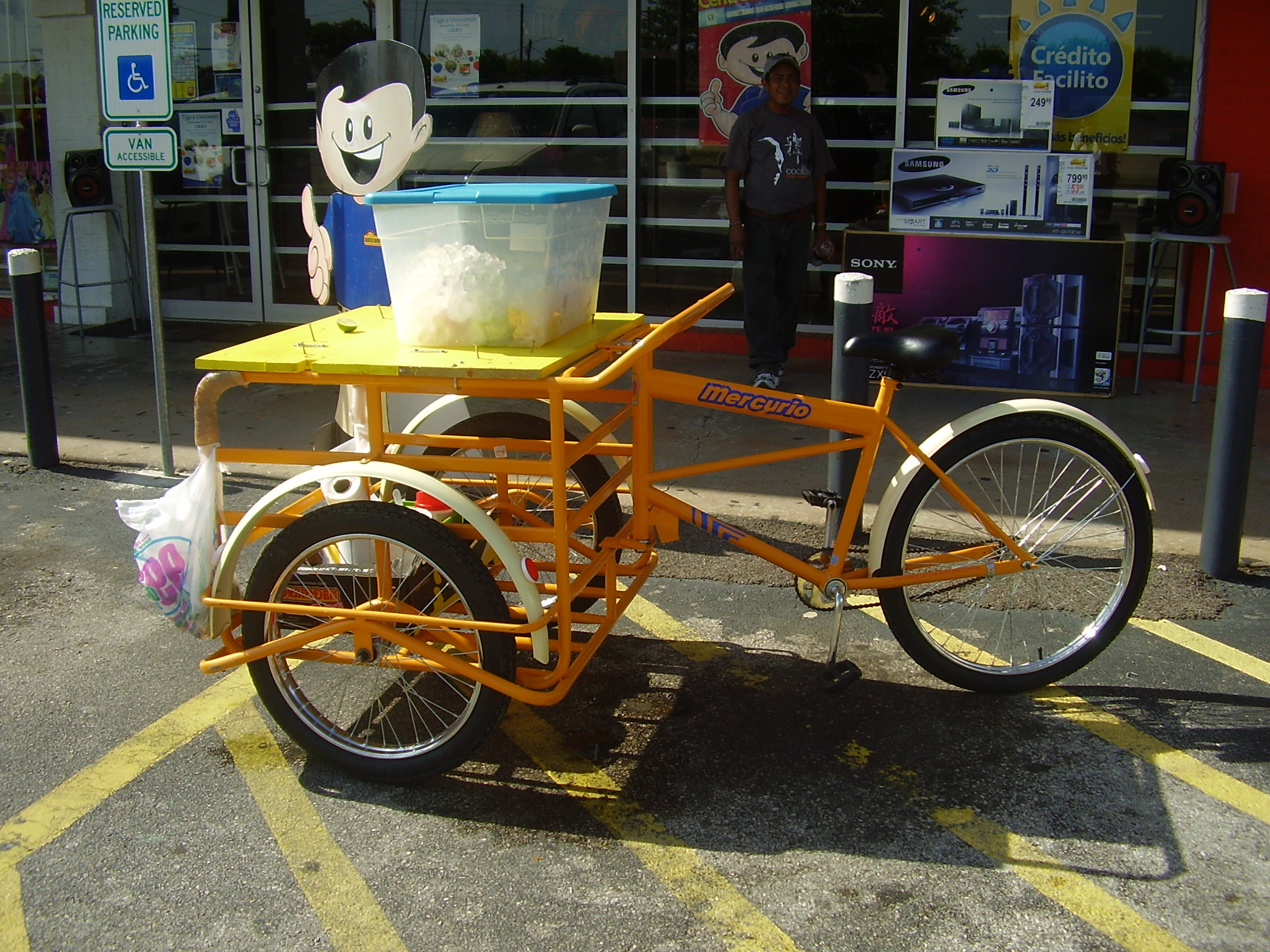
A paletero cart in Gulfton

The emergence of the Latino community led to changes in area businesses as they catered to the predominant population. In 2003 Kroger remodeled its Gulfton supermarket to cater to the new demographic. In December 2010 Kroger announced that the 59,000-square-foot (5,500 m^{2}) Kroger in Gulfton would close by the end of January, as it has been an under-performing store. Kroger owned the store location, and the chain was considering selling it to another grocery chain.

Fox Sports Net technical operations were formerly located on Gulfton Drive, before it moved to Fox Network Center - Woodlands in unincorporated Montgomery County around 2008. A 2008 Houston Chronicle article described the former FSN Network Operations Center as "flood-prone." It employed around 300 staff. In 2001 a partnership formed between Ed Farris, of Farris & Associates, and U.S. Builders for the construction of Plaza de Americas, a 30,000-square-foot (2,800 m^{2}) shopping center adjacent to the Kroger in Gulfton. The project was completed for $4 millionand hoped to attract retailers catering to Hispanic clients. Lane Design Group designed the center with a "Hispanic flavor." The developers believed that the Hispanic buying power in the Gulfton area would generate profits.

== Culture ==
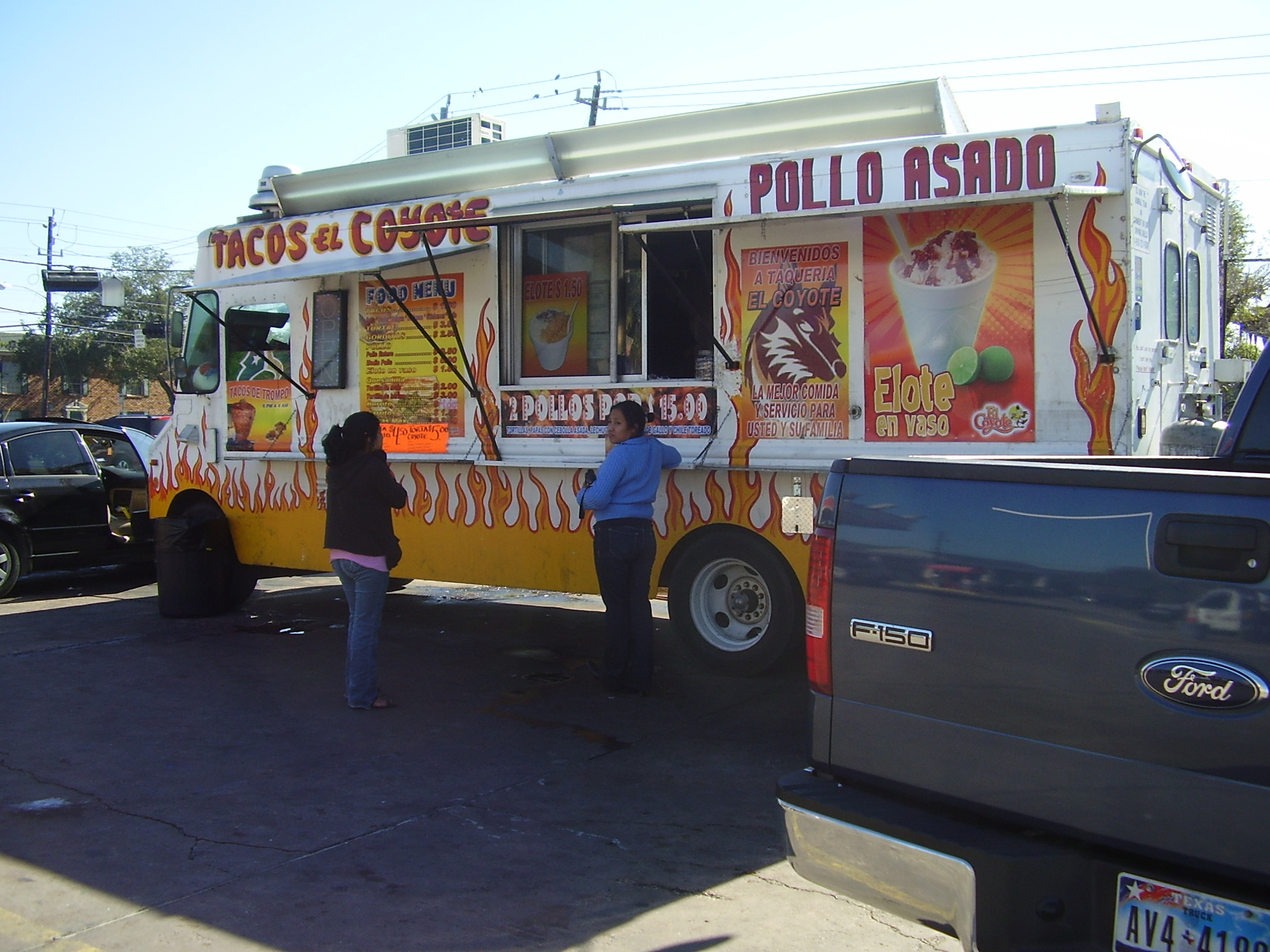
Tacos el Coyote, a taco truck

Oriana Garcia, a Gulfton-area community developer of Neighborhood Centers Inc., described Gulfton as, "sort of like the Ellis Island of the current time." Residents represent seventy distinct cultures, speak thirty different languages, and live in an area approximately 16,000 square feet (1,500 m^{2}). Garcia refers to the population as, "probably the most dense area in Houston." Adrian Garcia, the anti-gang office director for the Mayor of Houston in 2002, also referred to Gulfton as, "somewhat of an Ellis Island." Susan Rogers of the Rice Design Alliance said that Gulfton's "affordable housing, shops, language, food, and culture all help to provide a familiar environment that eases the residents' transition to life in America." Rogers also said, "In many ways the residents of Gulfton are more connected globally than locally."

In 1995 GANO activist Francisco Lopez, an El Salvador refugee, said, "Gulfton is what Denver Harbor is to Mexicans. Any recent Latin American immigrant has a relationship to Gulfton." Lopez added that the immigrants mainly remain in the area because of the Fiesta Mart and other businesses that cater to the immigrant population. Lopez explained that many people originally expected Gulfton would provide a transient location for immigrants, who would then leave for other neighborhoods. By 1995 many had stayed in Gulfton and become long term residents even switching apartments but not leaving the area. In 2010 Katharine Shilcutt of the Houston Press said "Gulfton now possesses such a wide range of ethnic cuisines, restaurants and grocery stores, it can almost be seen as a microcosm of Houston."

The popularity of soccer (football) in the neighborhood flourished after the Southwest Houston Soccer Association was established in the 1990s. Prior to its establishment, a few adult teams existed, but no youth league. In 1995, Silvia Ramirez, a soccer coach, said in a newspaper article that a lack of confidence in English language abilities and long work hours prevented many area residents from creating soccer leagues. The same article quotes citizens who believe that playing soccer prevented them from joining gangs. In 2007, Diana De La Rose, principal of Jane Long Middle School, said that soccer was popular among Gulfton-area students. In 2010 the Houston Dynamo soccer team proposed the construction of a stadium near Gulfton. Instead the BBVA Compass Stadium began construction in East Downtown.

Neighborhood Centers Inc. began work in the Gulfton and Sharpstown areas around 30 years before 2011. In 1998 Neighborhood Centers opened El Puente (The Bridge), a privately operated community center on the grounds of the Napoleon Square Apartments, a complex which had a predominantly Spanish-speaking population. El Puente is located in three apartment units that had been converted into office space and play areas. Two of the apartment units are connected to each other. The center's goal is to provide community support to replace the community support that the immigrants had previously received in Latin America. As of 1999, ten different agencies provided services at El Puente and 135 families signed up to receive the services. As of 1999, at the center, the Houston Public Library provided literacy classes, Houston Community College provided English classes, the Houston Independent School District provided preschool services for three- and four-year-olds, the University of Houston Graduate College of Social Work arranged assessments for graduate students studying social work, and the Sisters of Charity's Southwest Clinic provided prenatal and preventive medical services. In 2003 the Chrysalis Dance Company provided dance sessions at El Puente, used to teach English to mothers and children. Maricela Grun, the coordinator of the complex, said in 1999 that the center was needed because children had few activities available. She said that "The children have very little to do. They're just confined to their apartments." In 2007, the group announced that it would build the Gulfton Neighborhood Campus at the intersection of Rookin Street and High Star Drive, once it raises the $20 million ($31054405.39 in today's money) needed.

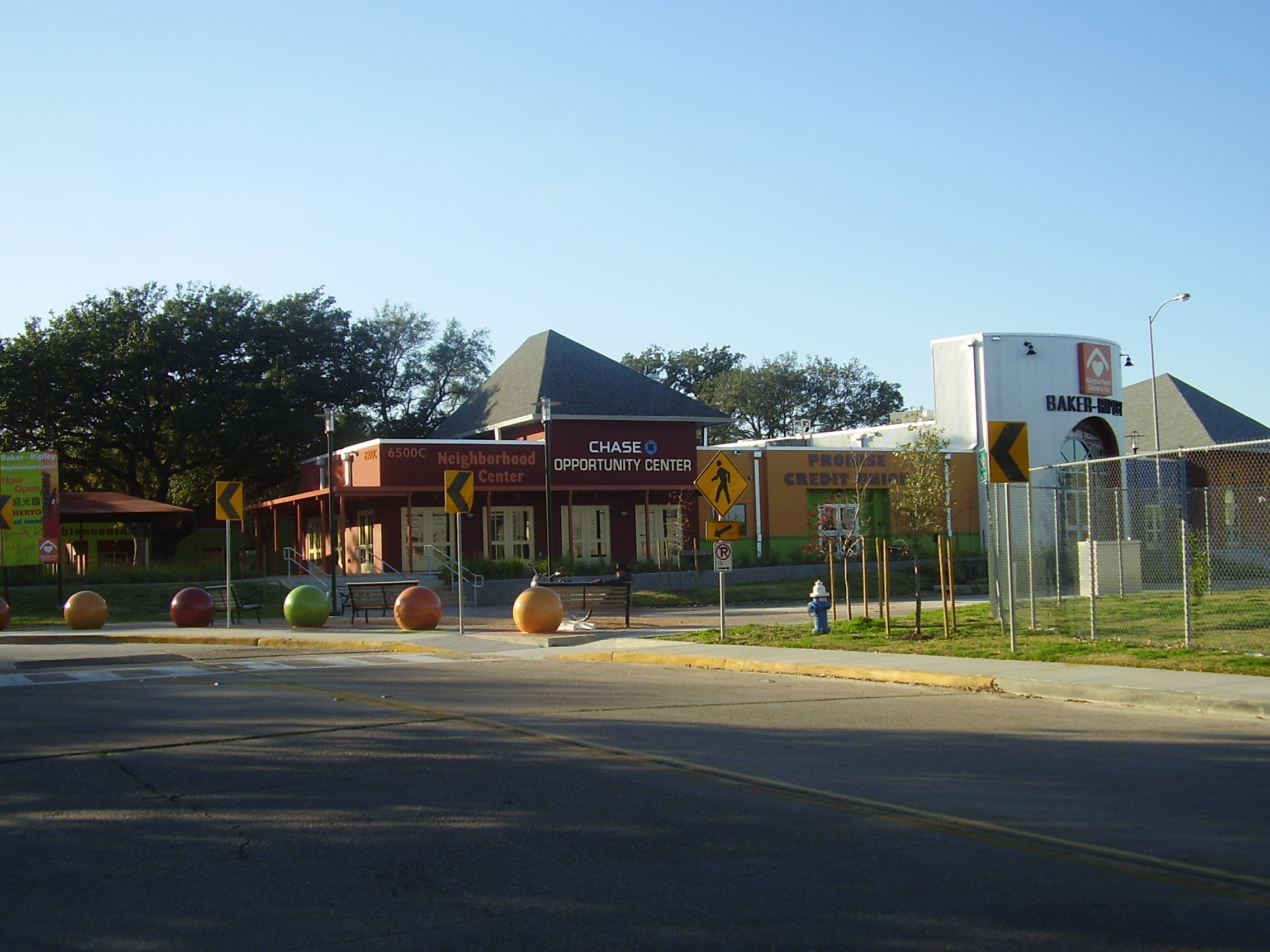
Baker-Ripley Neighborhood Center in the Southwest Management District

The Baker-Ripley Neighborhood Center, in the Southwest Management District, was scheduled to open in December 2009. The center consists of a 4 acres (1.6 ha) campus with five buildings. Designed by New Orleans–based Concordia architects and landscaped by Asakura Robinson Company, the site contains a farmers market, health clinic, outdoor film venue, publicly accessible library, school, and some outdoor recreation areas. The center design incorporates architectural influences from Mexican and South American art. Rosa Gomez, an employee of Neighborhood Centers, said that the organization did not want Baker-Ripley to appear "too fancy or official looking" so as not to intimidate recent immigrants. The non-profit organization Project for Public Spaces assisted in the development of Baker-Ripley. The organizers consulted residents of Gulfton and Sharpstown on the design of the center. Susan Baker, the wife of James Baker, a former U.S. Secretary of State, organized a fundraising campaign for the center. The center offers English and computer classes. Neighborhood Centers received a United States Department of Education Promise Neighborhood planning grant, used to fund its Gulfton Promise Project, a program to guide residents from birth until they obtain careers. A 2013 Houston Chronicle article stated that the center had never experienced a break in incident and that the Gulfton community "embraced" it.

Texas Children's Pediatric Associates Gulfton is a child health care center affiliated with Texas Children's Hospital. As the third such pediatric primary health care center opened by Texas Children's, the Gulfton campus exists as part of Project Medical Home to assist families with financial hardships avoid using emergency departments for primary care visits.

In 2004, many promotoras (promoters) operated in Gulfton. These individuals are recruited from "hard-to-reach" communities and study health care from doctors and non-profit organizations and then return to their communities to educate people in health care practices. U.S. public health care programs adopted promotoras from the Latin American model, although its use in Gulfton varies some from the Latin American system. For example, promotoras in the U.S. cannot legally dispense medication.

Prior to the change in demographics, at one apartment complex, Napoleon Square, residents socialized at the swimming pools on afternoons. The area nightclubs were active during evenings. During that era the members of the ethnic groups in the Napoleon Square apartment complex mainly kept to themselves. Harry Hurt III of the Texas Monthly said "while being one of the most integrated neighborhoods in Houston with its rainbow of human kinds and colors, Napoleon Square seemed to be one of the most factionalized, hardly a melting pot."

=== Religion ===
The Roman Catholic Archdiocese of Galveston-Houston operates Holy Ghost Church on a 10-acre (4.0 ha) property, in the Gulfton area, one city block from Bellaire. The church building is in the shape of a "T". In 2006 it had about 4,000 regular parishioners. It give church services in both English and Spanish, with three masses per language each week. In 2006 a man who was bilingual in English and Spanish was the pastor. A group of volunteers created stained glass windows that were put in the church by 2008; the project began circa 1983.

Additionally there are various "storefront churches" for non-Catholic varieties of Christianity.

== Crime ==
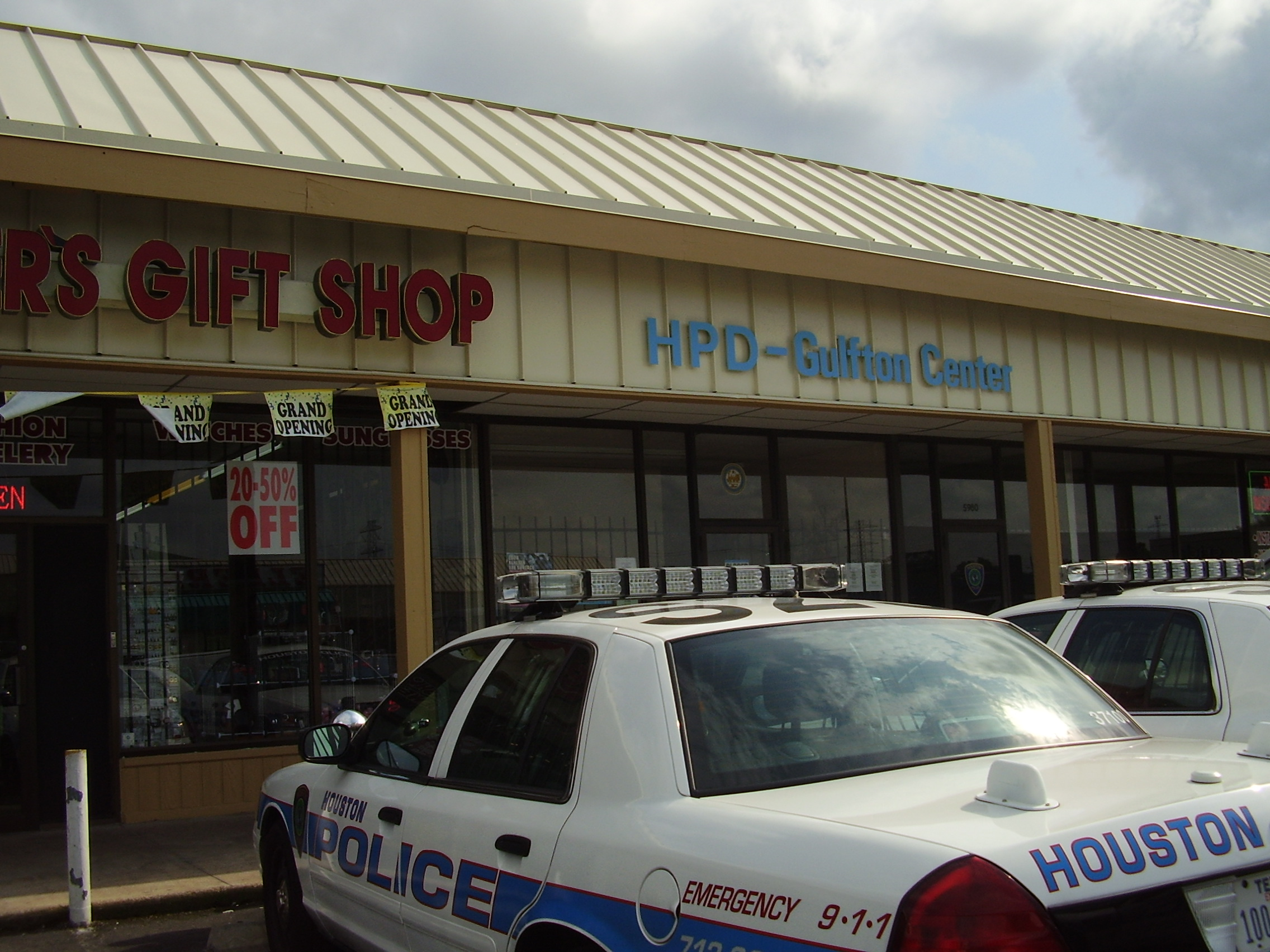
Houston Police Department Gulfton Storefront (former location)

In 1977 Gulfton was a part of the Police District 18. During that year, out of the twenty police districts, it had the second highest rate of reported crimes after the North Side of Houston. Out of the districts it had the highest rates of fraud and suicide, the second highest rates in automobile theft, burglary, theft, and vandalism, the fourth highest rape rate, the fifth highest robbery rate, the eighth highest drug-related arrest and narcotic crime rate, and the 13th highest rate of murder; all of this was prior to the Hispanic immigration influx of the 1980s. Harry Hurt III of the Texas Monthly said that the density of the apartments and the conformity of the design made it easy for criminals to operate in the complexes; if a criminal figured out how to break into one unit, he could break into all of them as they all shared the same design. In 1977 Hurt said that cocaine and quaaludes "appear to be common" in the apartments and that heroin "is also found in the area occasionally, though not as frequently as in some other parts of town." Hurt also stated that several area residents and ex-residents complained of theft. Around 1977, three accused rapists known in the area were the "Blade" rapist, the "Beer Belly" rapist, and the "Jumper Cable" rapist. The younger on average population of Gulfton during the time also contributed to the high crime rate.

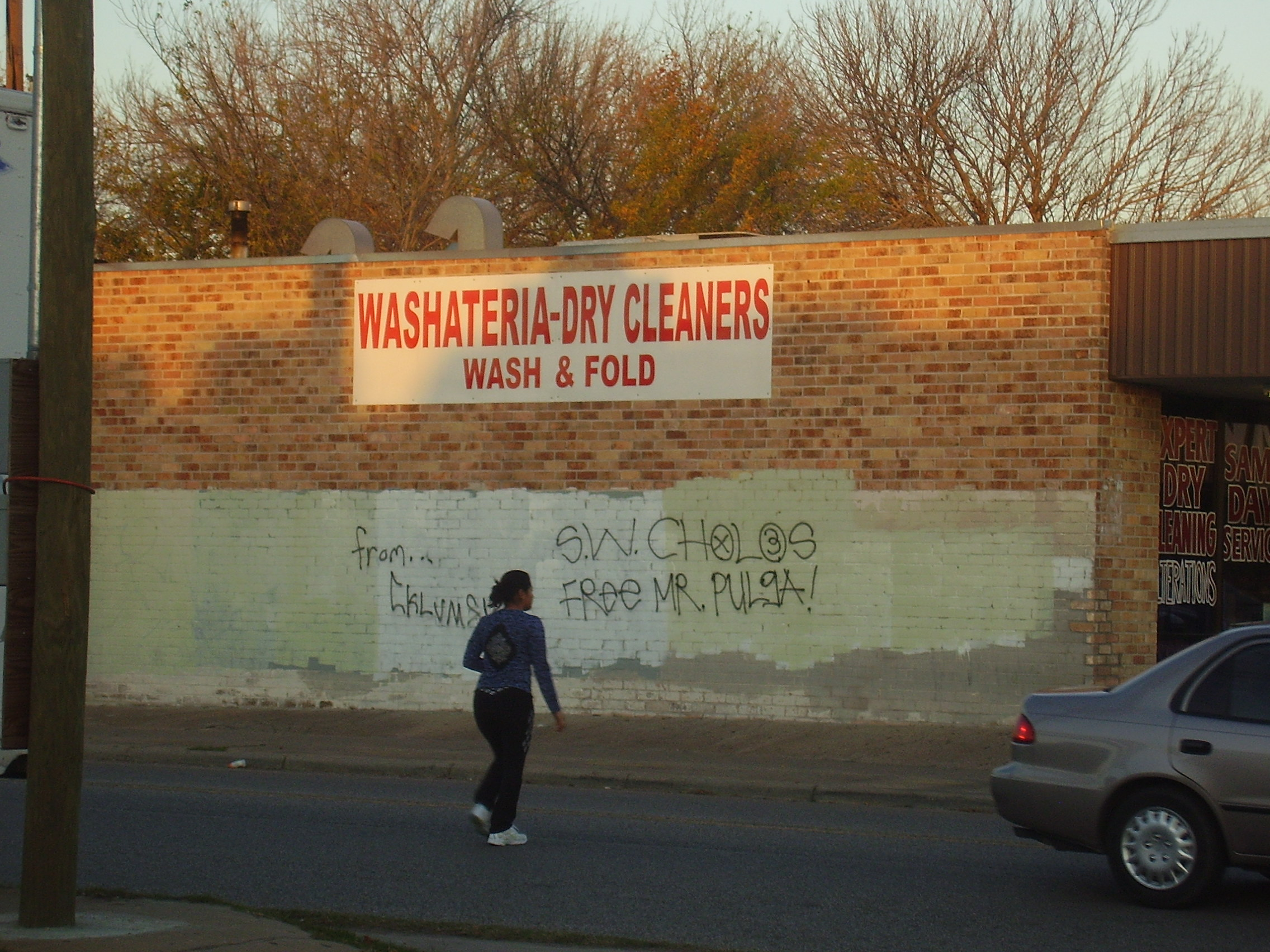
Southwest Cholos graffiti

After the 1980s economic decline and changes in the local demographics, crime increased in Gulfton. By 1988, many Houstonians referred to the neighborhood as the Gulfton Ghetto. The area derived its name from Gulfton Drive which was described by Kim Cobb of the Houston Chronicle as, "one of the area's more notorious streets." In a 1988, a Houston Chronicle article cited police officers patrolling the Gulfton area who could identify complexes where they often arrest criminals. In April 1992, Houston Mayor Bob Lanier named Gulfton as one of ten Houston neighborhoods targeted by a city revitalization program. One aspect of Lanier's project consisted of building barricades around the Shenandoah subdivision to reduce traffic and crime. The Shenandoah Civic Association and some members or the GAAC supported the measures and pursued the street closures. The Gulfton Area Neighborhood Organization (GANO) and other advocacy groups opposed the barricades. Members of these community groups considered the measures to be racially motivated. They voiced the opinion that the closures would not provide effective crime control, was a waste of city funds, and the closures would potentially harm local businesses.

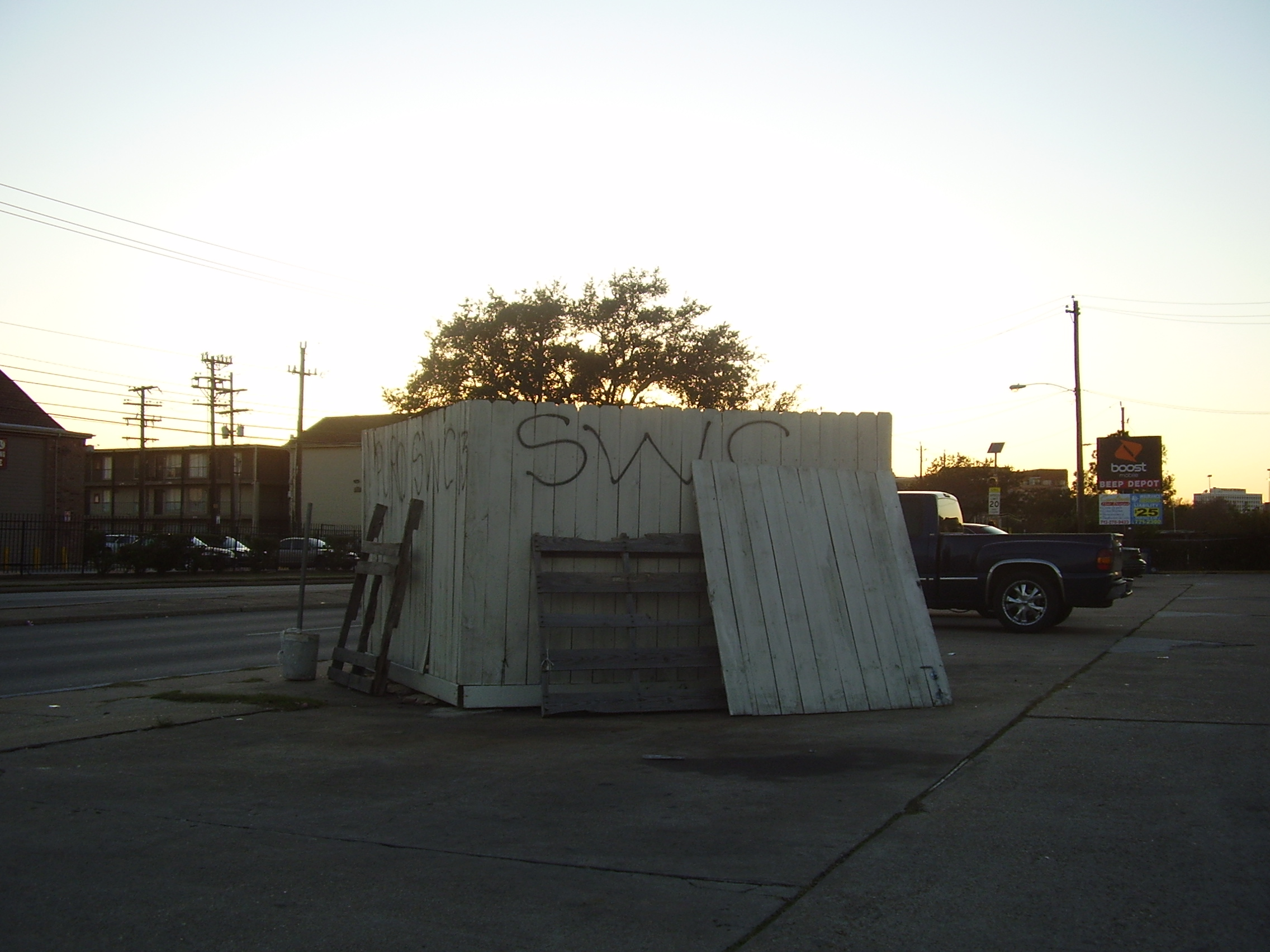
Southwest Cholos graffiti

After the demographics changed, youth street gangs appeared in Gulfton. As of 2006 the Gulfton area has gangs such as "Southwest Cholos," "La Primera," "La Tercera Crips," "Somos Pocos Pero Locos," and "Mara Salvatrucha" (MS-13). Charles Rotramel, the director of a nonprofit group called "Youth Advocates," said that Gulfton's dense conditions, lack of features intended for children, and lack of recreational and athletic programs helped form the gang cultures. He added that other factors included fathers being absent, including many who were imprisoned, and mothers who had issues like drug and alcohol addictions or mothers who worked for jobs with very lengthy working hours. In 1993, the "Southwest Cholos" began to appear in Gulfton. The gang did not have a traditional leadership structure like those in New York City and Los Angeles. Several police officers said that the gang engaged in criminal activities. Controversy erupted in 1995 after six teenagers and two adults sustained injuries in a drive-by shooting near Jane Long Middle School. Police believed that the shooting was related to street gangs and arrested a 13-year-old Sharpstown Middle School student in connection with the shooting. The Gulfton Area Neighborhood Organization had demanded for years that the City of Houston expand its anti-crime activities. Sarah Turner, a spokesperson for the mayor, insisted that the city had taken corrective action.

During the same year, the State of Texas announced it would provide $500,000 worth of grant funds to Gulfton-area agencies for crime prevention programs. The state targeted Gulfton because the zip code had 419 juvenile probation referrals, the highest for any zip code in Harris County. After the grant was established, GANO, the Shenandoah Civic Association, and GARC worked together to reduce juvenile crime. In 1995, Nelson Reyes, a counselor for immigrants from Mexico and El Salvador at the Gulfton Area Neighborhood Organization, said that local parents had positive attitudes about living in Gulfton as they made more money than they did in their home countries, but Gulfton-area children felt impacted by the area crime.

Rose Mary Garza, the principal of Benavidez Elementary School in 1995, stated that she hated hearing the term "Gulfton Ghetto," which was still in common use at the time, as the community was trying to move away from that stereotype. Crime rates in Gulfton decreased that year and Captain Charles Bullock, commander of the Southwest Patrol on Beechnut Street said that an increased police presence caused the crime rates to decrease.

In the 1990s City of Houston officials started the "Weed and Seed" program, where funds would be used to replace criminal activity with positive community activities. The City of Houston spent $800,000 in five years on Gulfton. Items funded through "Weed and Seed" included "United Minds," a leadership program for teenagers, the Las Américas Education Center built on the Las Américas Apartments property, the Gulfton Community Learning Center, and a computer lab at an area park. Adrian Garcia, the anti-gang office director of the Mayor of Houston, said in 2002 that the "Weed and Seed" program restored a sense of community and safety to Gulfton, which "was never engineered for family life," without "heavy-handed police tactics."

A University of Houston professor, Peter Nguyen, remarked in 2005, "You almost get a different sense of feeling once you cross over to Bellaire." Bellaire is an incorporated city consisting of single-family houses and a reputation for safety. Nguyen said that he believed the city should increase efforts to reduce crime in Gulfton. He added that it would be difficult to engage Gulfton's population of "working people", living "day to day", to participate in anti-crime activities like crime watches. Bruce Williams, a Houston Police Department Captain, states that it is difficult to fight crime with the reductions in manpower. Williams said that U.S. federal government agents began working with the Houston Police Department to arrest serious gang criminals in Gulfton, including Mara Salvatrucha (MS-13) members who were operating in the neighborhood. In 2007, Tammy Rodriguez, head of the Gulfton Super Neighborhood department for the City of Houston, and the Fondren Patrol Division announced that the division would expand its Police Apartments Clergy Team (PACT) into three Gulfton complexes. PACT places married couples who are active in churches into the apartment complexes so they can work with tenants. The PACT program initially focused on the Napoleon Square and Chateaux Carmel complexes. In August 2009 a gang war erupted between the Southwest Cholos and other area gangs causing violence to increase in Gulfton and surrounding areas.

Anti-Graffiti efforts were undertaken by Gulfton Weed & Seed and the Mayor's Anti-Gang Office to reduce the amount of gang graffiti in the area. A community mural was completed by at-risk youth on the side of Kroger's in 1999 as part of a collaborative effort between the Orange Show, Gulfton Weed & Seed and the United States Attorney's Office. The mural was featured in the Houston Chronicle and on several major news outlets. In 2005 M. J. Khan, then the city council member of District F, promoted an anti-graffiti campaign within his district.

In 2018 the federal government announced the breakup of a prostitution ring operated out of the Carriage Way apartment complex in Gulfton. On November 3 and December 7, 2017, a federal grand jury indicted people who were members of Southwest Cholos and those associated with the gang; a total of 24 people were indicted on those two days.

== Education ==
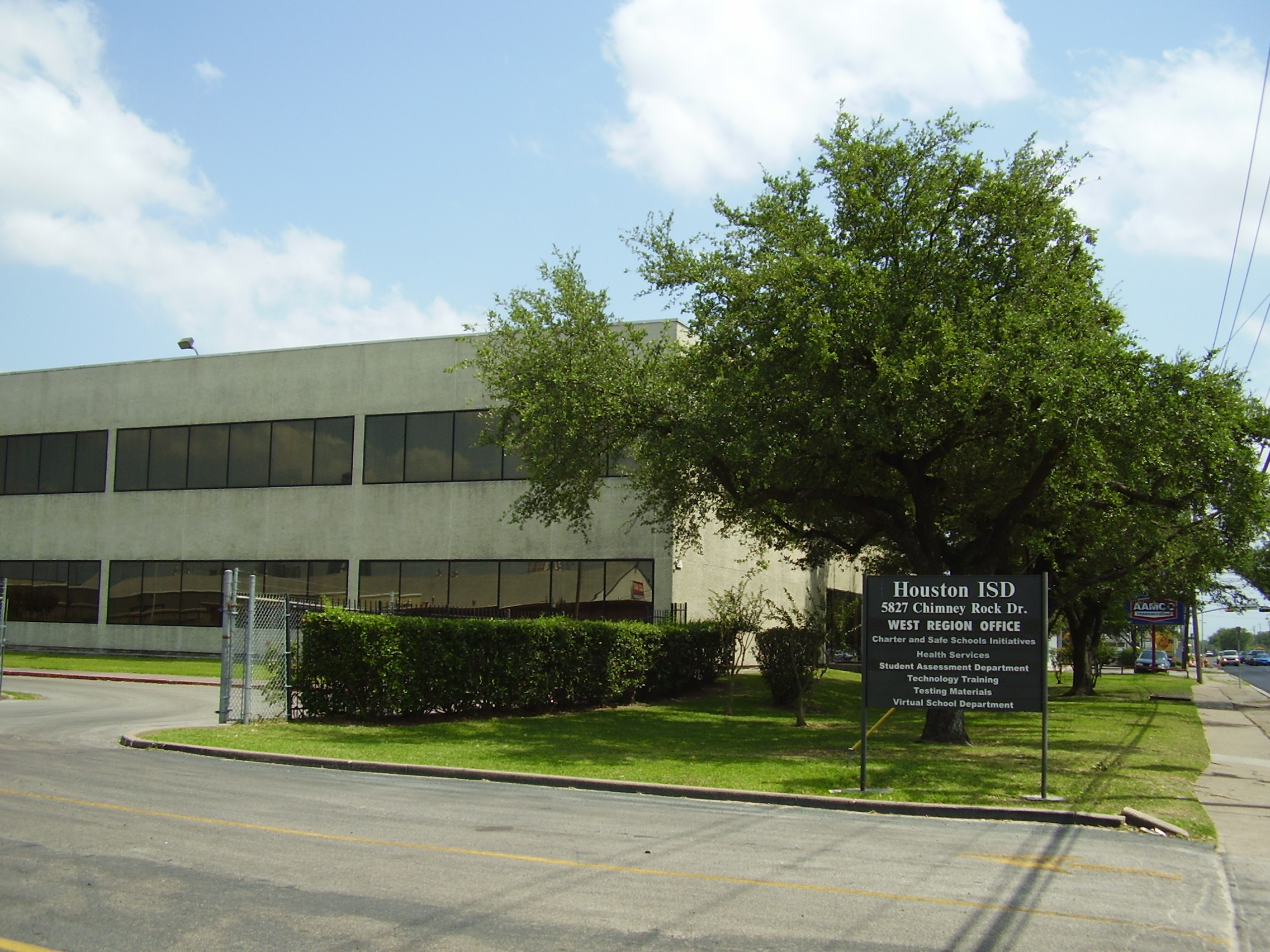
Houston ISD offices

=== Primary and secondary schools ===
Gulfton is zoned for public schools in the Houston Independent School District (HISD) and divided between Trustee District V and Trustee District VII.

As of 2010 the Student Assessment department of HISD and the Technology Department Technical Support Services and Training offices (Teledyne Training Facility) are located in a building in the Gulfton area. Previously the district's West Region offices, Charter and Safe Schools Initiatives office, Health and Medical Services office, and Virtual School Department were located in the facility. Prior to HISD's 2005 reorganization, the Southwest District was headquartered where the West Region offices and Alternative Education offices now reside. Around 2004 the West Central District offices occupied the Chimney Rock facility.

==== Elementary and middle schools ====
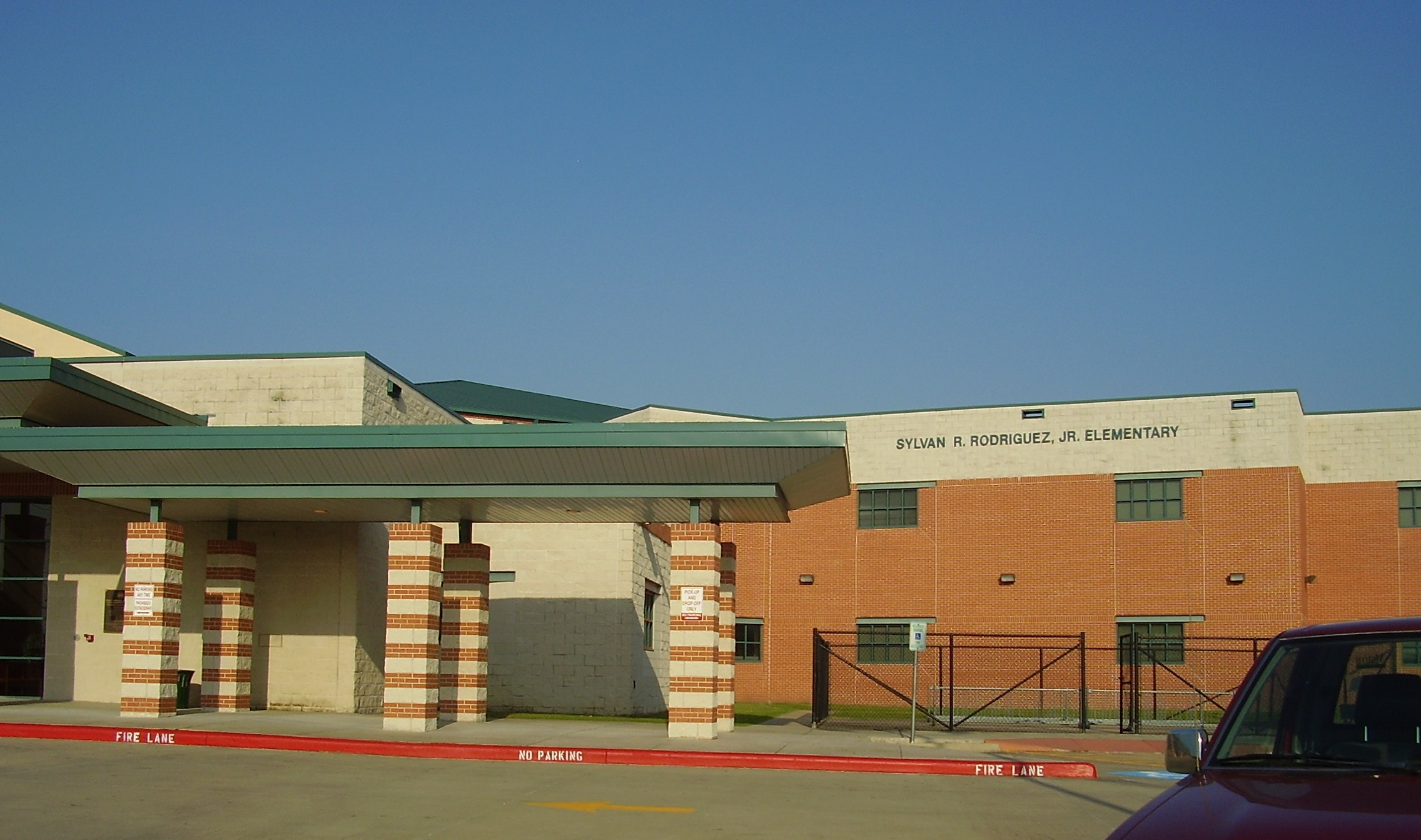
Rodríguez Elementary School

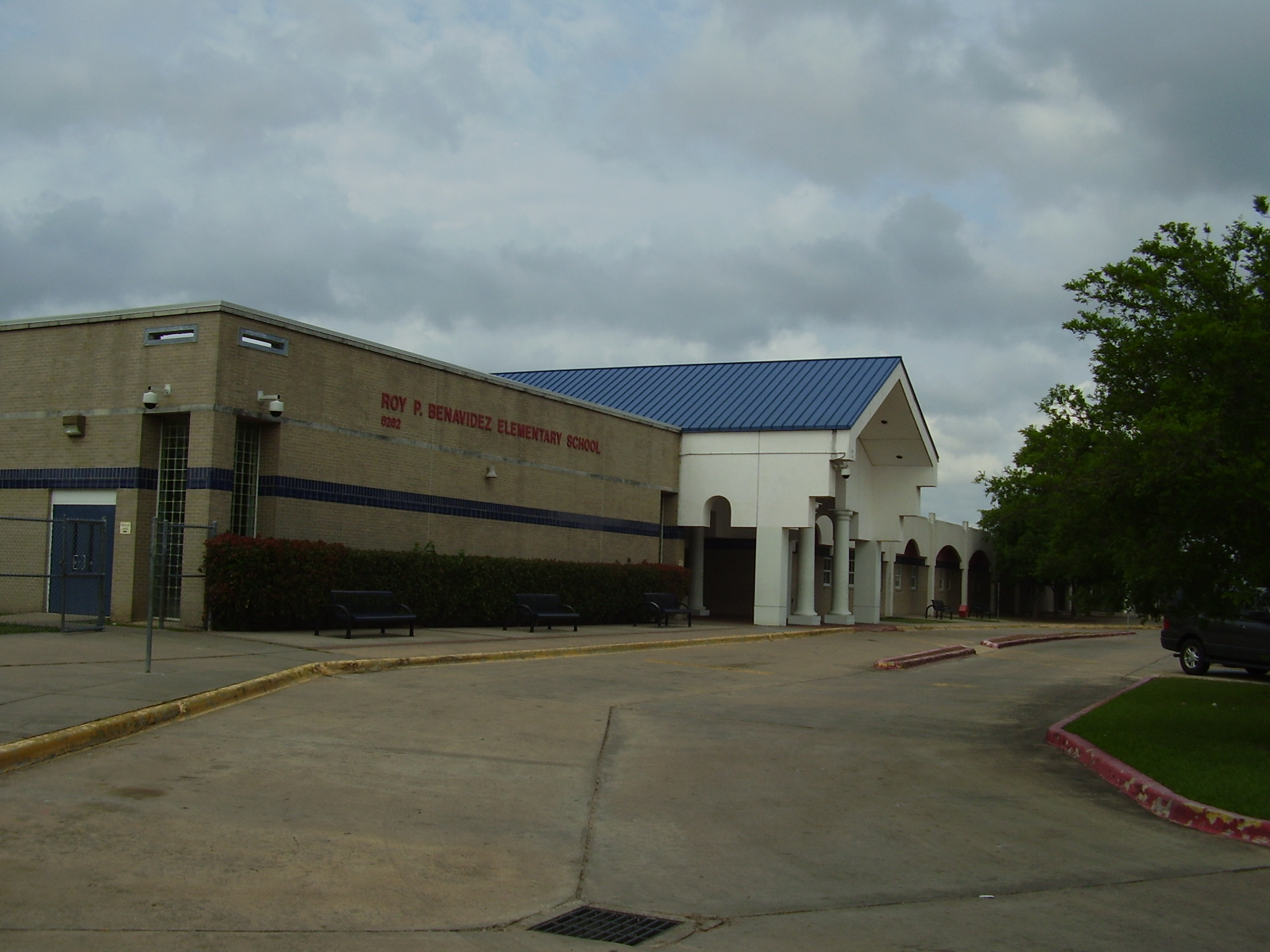
Benavidez Elementary School

The attendance boundaries of Benavidez Elementary School, Braeburn Elementary School, Cunningham Elementary School, and Rodriguez Elementary School cover sections of Gulfton. The Gulfton area is zoned to Jane Long Middle School with Pin Oak Middle School, located in the City of Bellaire, as an option.

Gabriela Mistral Early Childhood Center in Gulfton is the early childhood center nearest Gulfton. Poor students, homeless students, students not proficient in English, and children of active-duty members of the U.S. military or whose parents have been killed, injured, or missing in action while on active duty may attend Mistral. Las Américas Middle School and Kaleidoscope Middle School, two optional middle schools, are located in the Long Middle School campus.

Several state charter schools are located in Gulfton. SER-Niños Charter School is a pre-kindergarten through 8th grade state charter school in Gulfton. SER-Niños as of 2009 receives state funds per student and relies on philanthropy for other expenses. Prospective students receive admittance based on a lottery. The students are mostly of Mexican and Salvadoran descent. Amigos Por Vida Friends For Life Charter School, opened in 1999, is a state charter school for pre-kindergarten 3 through grade 8. The Academy of Accelerated Learning, Inc. operates a charter school in Gulfton. YES Prep Gulfton, home of the Force (originally YES Prep Lee), a state charter middle and high school that was originally located on the Lee High School campus, expanded to the six through twelve grades with thirty classrooms. As of 2007 many students at YES Prep Lee were from the Gulfton area. YES Prep Gulfton is now located in the Southwest Management District. The Baker-Ripley Charter School is located on the grounds of the Baker-Ripley Neighborhood Center in the Southwest Management District. KIPP Houston operates KIPP: Connections in the Southwest Management District. The Juvenile Justice Charter School serves residents of the Burnett-Bayland Reception Center and the Burnett-Bayland Home.

There are several private schools in the Gulfton area. Robindell Private School serves preschool through Grade 3. In addition to acting as a private elementary school, it also houses a 24-hour daycare program. The Holy Ghost School, a PreK-8 Roman Catholic school operated by the Roman Catholic Archdiocese of Galveston-Houston, is in the Gulfton Super Neighborhood.

Most children live within 2 mi (3.2 km) (as measured by travel along the closest public roads) of their assigned elementary schools, so they are usually not eligible for free school bus transportation. This means that many children have to walk or ride bicycles to school.

===== History of elementary and middle schools =====
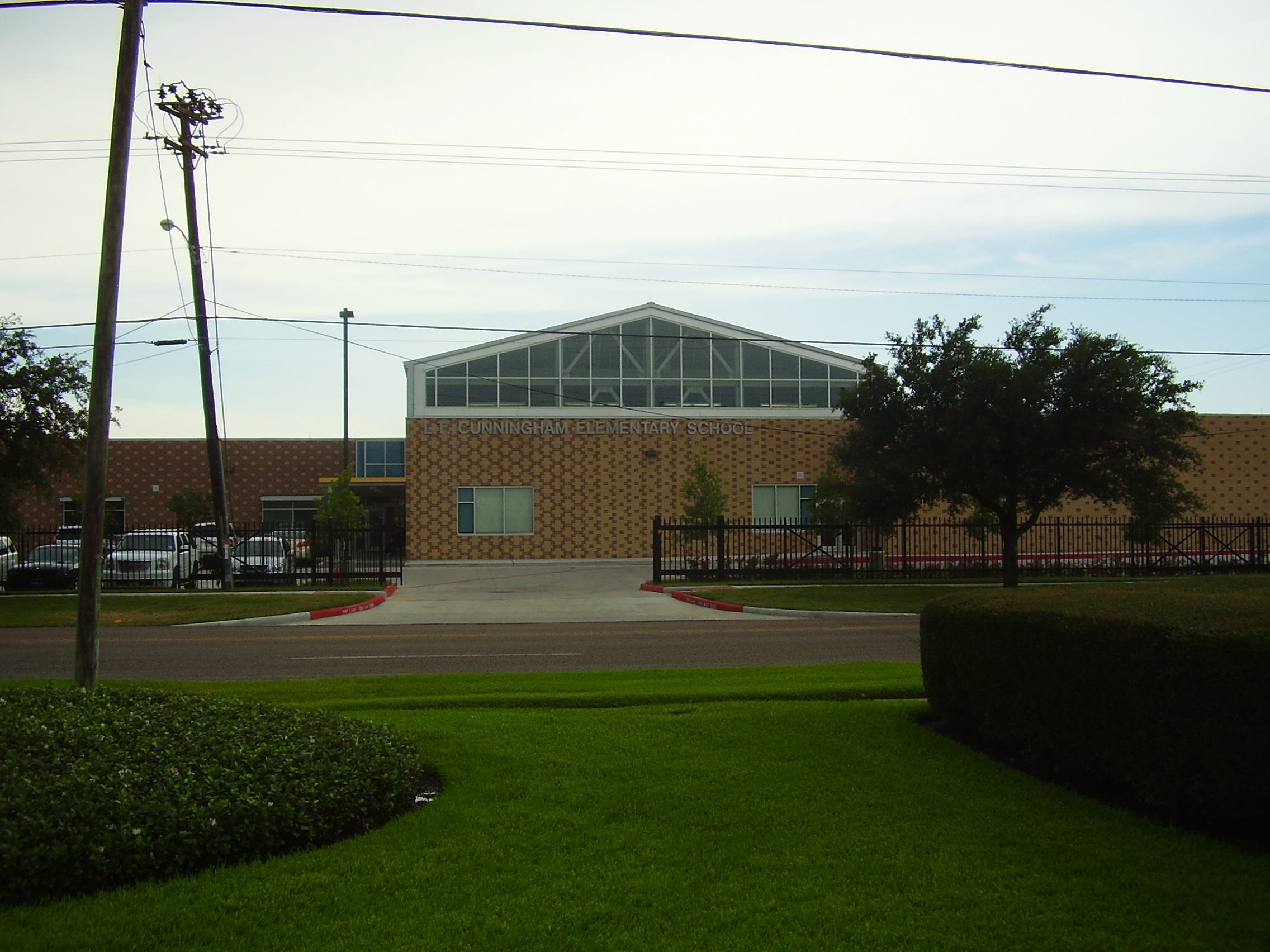
Cunningham Elementary School

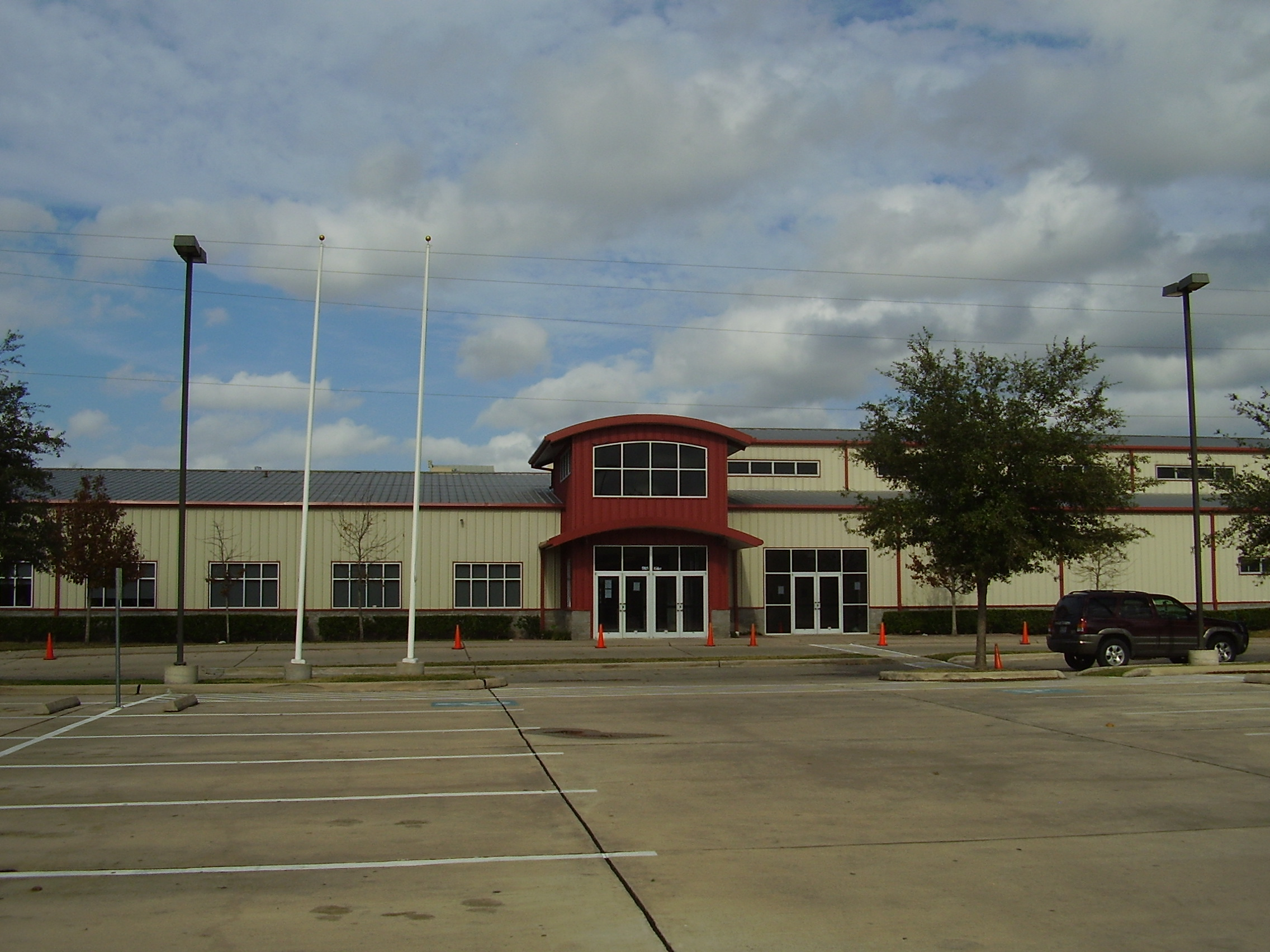
SER-Niños Charter School

In 1953, Cunningham Elementary School, the first elementary school to serve Gulfton, was built with a capacity for 300 students. Braeburn Elementary School opened in 1956. Long Middle School, which as of 2008 serves Gulfton, opened in 1957.

In 1979, Cunningham Elementary School had 436 students, well over its original capacity of 300. 75.5% of them were White, 14% qualified for free lunch, and 15% qualified for reduced cost lunch. Due to the increasing population and the sudden conversion of adults-only complexes to family oriented, Cunningham Elementary School became overcrowded by 1986 with its enrollment increasing from around 500 in 1985 to more than 900 the next year. By 1988, Gordon Elementary School, a campus in Bellaire, Texas, re-opened to serve as a reliever school to Cunningham and to a non-Gulfton school. By September 3 of that year, 1,268 students were enrolled at Cunningham; 72% were classified as Hispanic and 99% were on free or reduced-cost lunch programs. Many of the children arrived from Central American countries experiencing civil strife, and therefore many had received an inadequate education prior to coming to the United States. In 1989, Cunningham's overcrowding was described as being "unanticipated." In 1988 the U.S. federal government passed the Fair Housing Act, which, under most circumstances, prohibits any policy that excludes families with children from living in an apartment complex. Abbe Boring, the principal of Cunningham in 1992, said that the student population increased when formerly singles-only apartments were required to allow families to rent complexes. In September 1991 Braeburn and Cunningham were two of 32 HISD schools that had capped enrollments; in other words, the schools were filled to capacity and excess students had to attend other schools. By 1992, Cunningham had around 1,200 students and 51 temporary classroom units. Immediately prior to the opening of Benavidez, Cunningham had 1,400 students.

Benavidez Elementary School, which opened on Tuesday, January 21, 1992, relieved Cunningham of around 675 students and 29 teachers. Benavidez, along with two other schools, was a part of a $370 million Houston ISD school construction project, which originated from a school bond approved in March 1989. Rose Garza, the principal of Benavidez, said that the committee determining the name of the school named it after Roy P. Benavidez, a soldier in the Vietnam War who was given the Medal of Honor, because the school wanted to name the school after a Hispanic who could serve as a positive role model to the mostly Hispanic student body that occupied the school when it opened. HISD officials said that the district had little difficulty opening the three schools in the middle of the year, since the same teachers had been teaching the same students while they occupied the previously overcrowded schools in the preceding fall. On its opening day Benavidez referred 400 students to other schools due to overcrowding. After Benavidez opened, Benavidez and Cunningham each had about 700 students. In 1994, Benavidez had 1,065 pupils and it had to send 200 children to different schools. As of that year, 88% of Benavidez's children were Hispanic. By 1996, both Cunningham and Benavidez became overcrowded. Gordon also became a reliever school for Benavidez and another non-Gulfton school. SER-Niños opened in 1996. In 2000 Benavidez had 1,300 students and Cunningham had 1,190 students. At the schools, the average classroom size was 30 students, exceeding the state's recommendation of 22 students per classroom.

The Las Américas Education Center, which included a preschool named Las Américas Early Childhood Development Center and two middle schools, Las Américas Middle School and Kaleidoscope Middle School, started in 1995 as a reliever campus for Cunningham and Benavidez. The reliever school was established with funds from the "Weed and Seed" program established by City of Houston officials. In 2000, the center moved into the Las Américas Apartments in Gulfton.

Rodriguez Elementary, built on almost 10 acres (4.0 ha) with Rebuild 2002 funds, opened during the first week 2002 to relieve Benavidez, Braeburn, and Cunningham. As a result, Rodriguez's attendance zone took territory from Benavidez and Cunningham's zones, while Cunningham's zone took territory from Braeburn's zone. Pin Oak Middle School in Bellaire opened in 2002 to relieve several overcrowded schools in southwestern Houston.

HISD paid around $200,000 to lease the Las Américas units. In October 2006, Michael Marquez, president of the Hispanic Housing and Education Corporation, which operated Las Américas, announced to HISD in a letter that the organization would terminate the lease agreement because of issues related to maintenance and management. The district decided to vacate the property instead of appealing the decision. In summer 2007, the former Las Américas Education Center closed. The early childhood center merged with Mistral and the middle schools moved to the Long Middle School campus.

Gordon Elementary School, located in the City of Bellaire, served as a reliever campus for Benavidez, Cunningham, and two non-Gulfton campuses, until it was converted into a Mandarin Chinese immersion school in 2012.

==== High schools ====
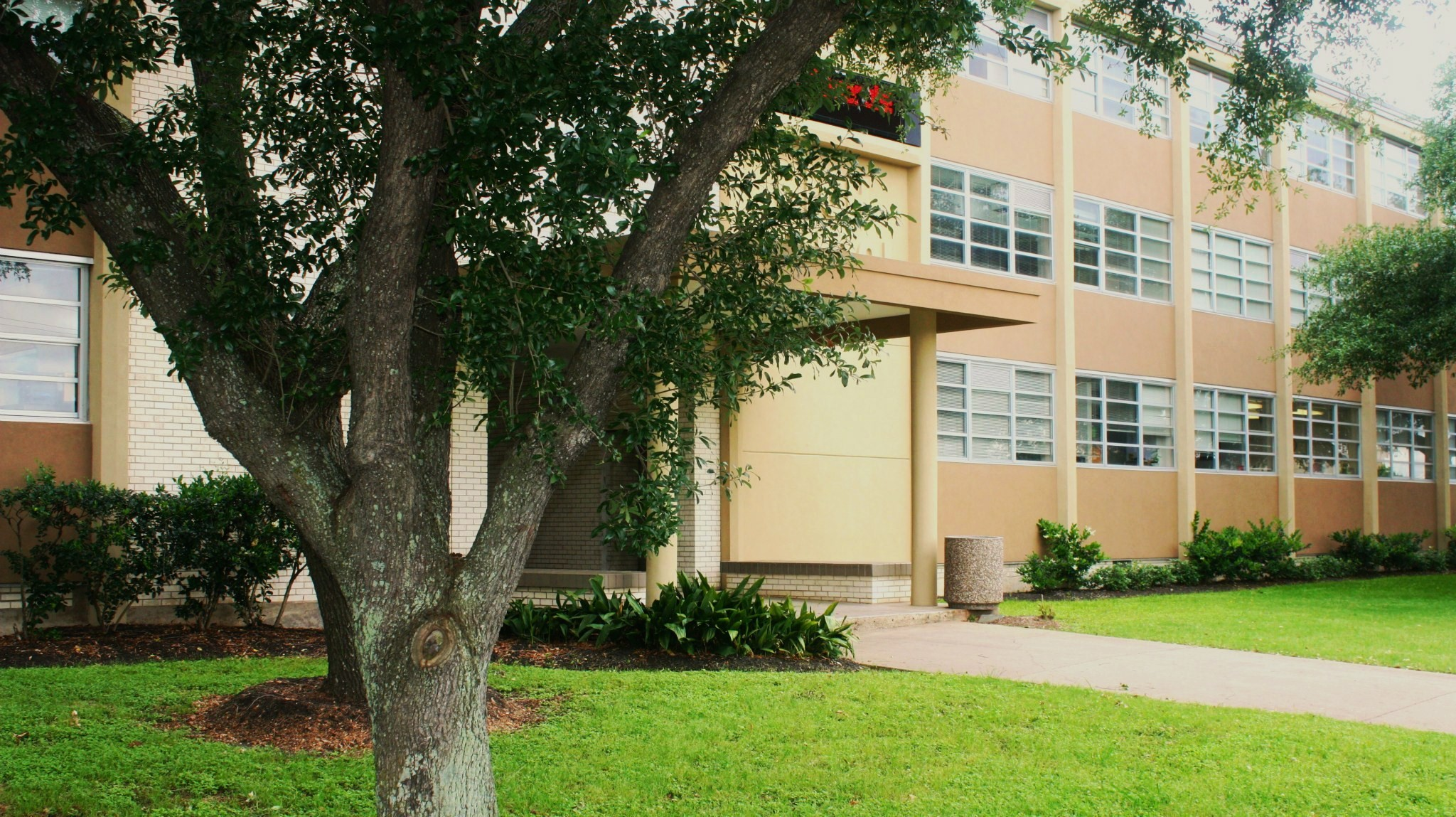
Margaret Long Wisdom High School

Gulfton residents are zoned to Margaret Long Wisdom High School (formerly Robert E. Lee High School), which opened in 1962 to relieve Lamar High School, with Lamar and Westside high schools as options. Most Gulfton high school-aged residents attend Wisdom High School. When it opened, Wisdom High School had mainly affluent white students; its demographics shifted to a mostly Hispanic and immigrant student body. In September 1991 Wisdom was one of 32 HISD schools that had capped enrollments, and excess students had to attend other schools. When Westside opened in 2000, residents of the Wisdom attendance boundary gained the option to attend Westside instead of Wisdom, with no free transportation provided. By 2004 three out of every four Wisdom students were born to non-English-speaking households.

Some areas of the Gulfton Super Neighborhood, defined by the City of Houston, are zoned to Bellaire High School. HISD also operates Liberty High School, a charter high school for recent immigrants. In January 2005, Houston ISD opened Newcomer Charter School on the Lee High School campus. School officials placed fliers in Gulfton-area apartment complexes, churches, flea markets, and washaterias. The school relocated to a shopping center along U.S. Highway 59 (Southwest Freeway) and adopted its current name in June 2007. In 2014 HISD opened Middle College High School-Gulfton at HCC's Gulfton facility; it is a non-traditional high school program for 150 students. As of 2022 Liberty is now located in Gulfton at the HCC facility.

==== Students in Gulfton public schools ====
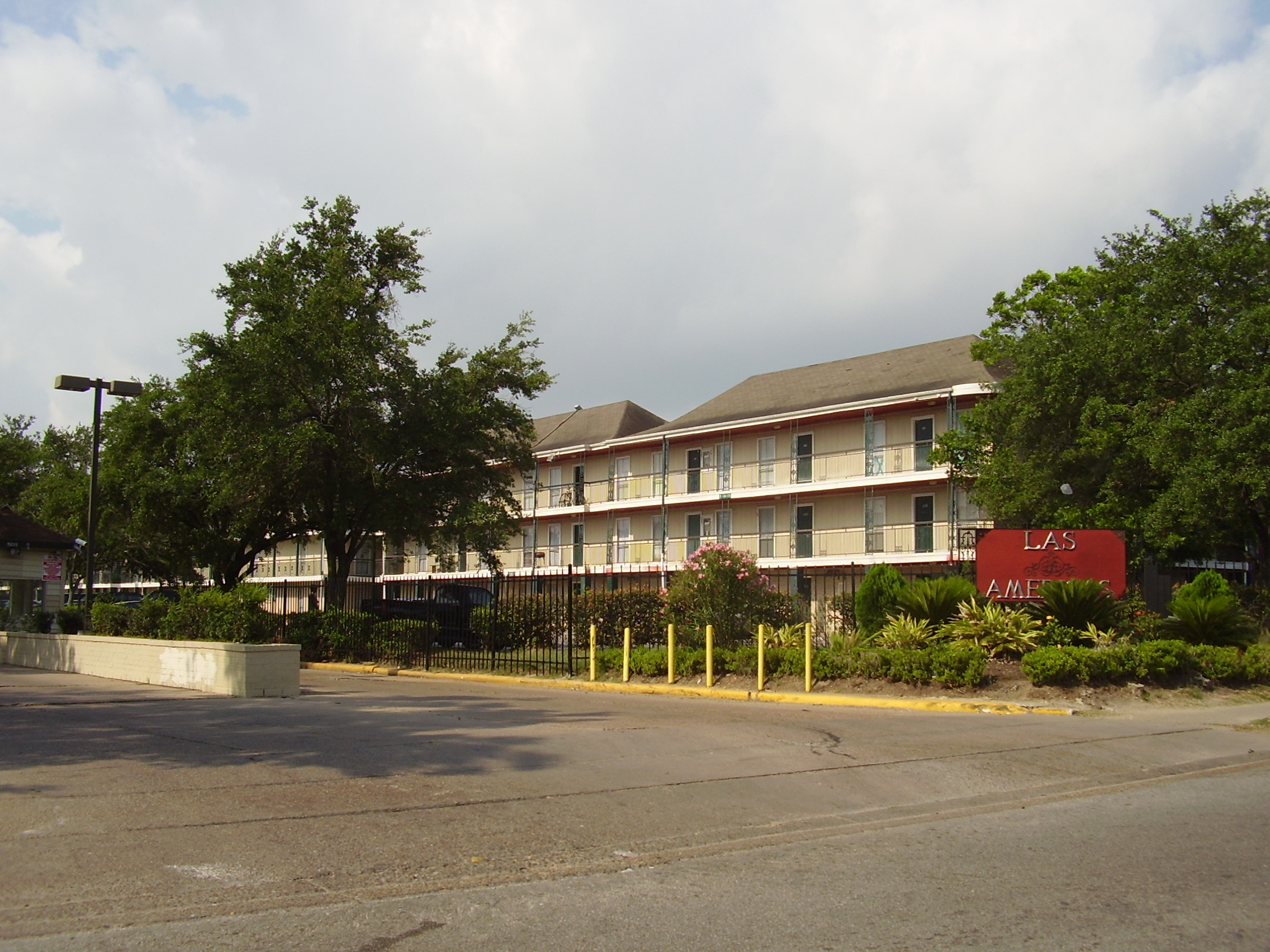
Las Américas Apartments, the former home of the Las Américas Education Center

By the 1997–1998 school year, 75% of Gulfton students qualified for free or reduced-price lunches. Almost 95% of Gulfton students were classified as economically disadvantaged, almost double the Texas rate. More than 70% of Gulfton students exhibited a lack of English language proficiency, while 27.6% of Houston ISD students and 13.4% of Texas residents exhibited this level of deficiency. Susana Herrera, the program coordinator for Houston's Truancy Reduction Demonstration Project, said that truancy was a major issue in Gulfton education and language barriers, a lack of supervision by parents and guardians, "high mobility," lack of familiarity with United States laws, and familial norms act as "barriers to attending school." A publication by the Office of Juvenile Justice and Delinquency Prevention stated that parental characteristics complicated their support of education, including low socioeconomic status, "language and cultural barriers," and "limited opportunities for acculturation." The City of Houston started the Gulfton Truancy Reduction Demonstration Project, which is operated by the Anti-Gang Office under the Mayor of Houston and includes support from Houston ISD, the Houston Police Department, and the municipal courts. Scott Van Beck, the head of HISD's West Region, in a keynote address to the Rotary Club of Bellaire that urban education needs "social capital" or frequent adult contact with children.

=== Community colleges ===
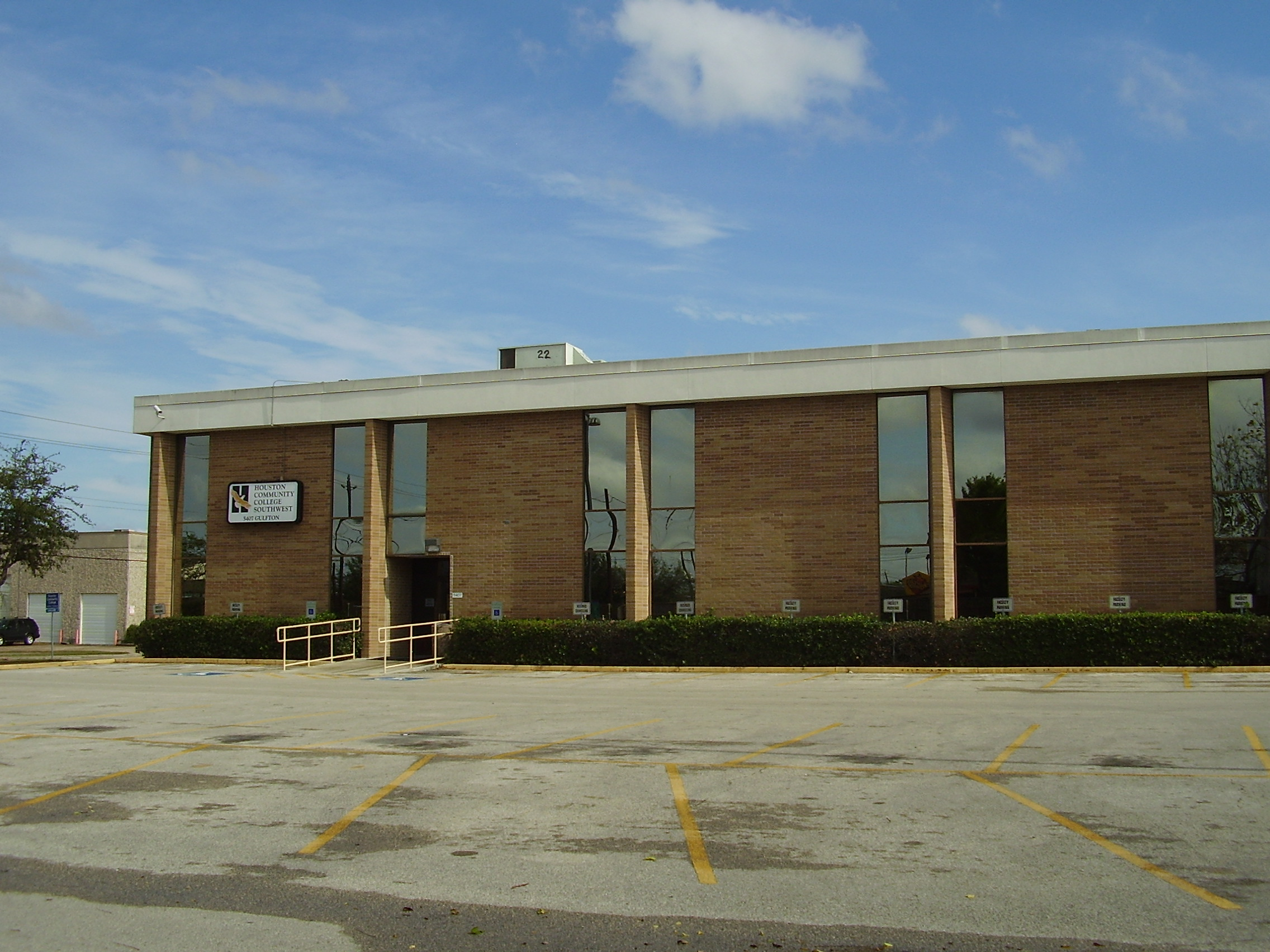
Houston Community College System Gulfton Center

Gulfton is within the jurisdiction of the Houston Community College System (HCCS). The community college district operates the HCCS Gulfton Center, inside a 35,100-square-foot (3,260 m^{2}) campus building owned by HCCS. The building opened in 1990 after Mutual Benefit Life Insurance Co. sold the building to HCCS for $700,000 ($1725038.21 when adjusted for inflation). The Gulfton campus is a part of the district's Southwest College.

=== Libraries ===
Houston Public Library (HPL) operates the HPL Express Southwest at the Southwest Multi-Service Center in the Southwest Management District (formerly Greater Sharpstown) and adjacent to Gulfton; the center was built in Sharpstown Industrial Park Section 6. HPL Express facilities are library facilities located in existing buildings. Prior to the opening of HPL Express Southwest on January 24, 2008, no libraries existed near Gulfton.

== See also ==
- Southwest Houston
- History of the Central Americans in Houston
- Districts and communities of Houston
- Geographic areas of Houston
- Forum Park, Houston
- Link Valley, Houston
- Thai Xuan Village
