= NCHS =

NCHS may refer to:

- National Center for Health Statistics, a center of the US Centers for Disease Control and Prevention (CDC)
- Nan Chiau High School, Singapore
- Naperville Central High School
- Natrona County High School in Casper, Wyoming
- Nebraska City High School in Nebraska City, Nebraska
- New Canaan High School in New Canaan, Connecticut
- New Castle High School (disambiguation), a disambiguation page listing multiple High Schools of that name.
- Newcomer Charter High School, now Liberty High School (Houston, Texas)
- Newton-Conover High School, in Newton, North Carolina
- Normal Community High School in Normal, Illinois
- North County High School (disambiguation), a disambiguation page listing multiple High Schools of that name.
- Northwest Christian High School (Lacey, Washington)
- North Central High School (disambiguation), a disambiguation page listing multiple High Schools of that name.
- The Northern California Herpetological Society
- North Cobb High School
