= Robindell, Houston =

Human settlement in Houston, Texas, US

Coordinates: 29.685°N 95.499°W

Robindell is a subdivision in Southwest Houston, Texas.

== History ==
Robert Kuldell developed the community in the 1950s on 110 acres (45 ha) of farmland that belonged to his family. The neighbourhood was originally targeted at former members of the United States Armed Forces. Robindell was developed before Meyerland, Sharpstown, and Westbury were.

In 1997, the City of Houston added Robindell to a neighborhood restoration program.

In 2009, Houston real estate blog website "Swamplot" nominated Robindell as Houston's Most Underappreciated Neighborhood. Similarly in 2010, the Houston Press nominated Robindell as one of Houston's Most Underrated Neighborhoods.

In 2014, Robindell was awarded second-place for "Neighbourhood of the Year" by Swamplot.

== Cityscape ==
In 2010, when comparing and contrasting Robindell to Bellaire and Meyerland, Richard Connelly of the Houston Press said that Robindell, like the other two neighbourhoods, has trees, but that "instead of McMansions it's been able to keep its older homes from being uprooted." Connelly added that in Robindell, like the other "hidden neighbourhoods" on the list, "you don't have to travel far to find trouble, but it's worth the occasional siren going by in the night."

The subdivision has 610 houses as of 1996, with sizes ranging from 1,100 square feet (100 m^{2}) to 1,500 square feet (140 m^{2}). As of that year, the median price was $56,590. As of 1996 the older houses, closer to Beechnut Street, had prices beginning at $50,000 ($102641.63 in current money). As of the same year, larger houses, closer to North Braeswood Boulevard, had prices beginning at $100,000 ($205283.26 in current money).

As of 1996, housing prices are lower in Robindell than in Meyerland and Maplewood because the Robindell houses are smaller and because Robindell is not zoned to Bellaire High School.

When the houses were first built, customers met with homebuilders and determined which style the house would use. This led to a variety in the housing architecture. Many of the homes are of the mid-century ranch style. Katherine Feser of the Houston Chronicle said that all of the houses had "quality workmanship and materials."

== Transportation ==
The Metropolitan Transit Authority of Harris County (METRO) operates public transportation services.

Around 1988, METRO proposed having Beechnut Street widened. Residents of Robindell, Meyerland, and Maplewood appeared before the METRO board and protested the plans, stating that they would result in increased traffic. METRO dropped the plans.

== Government and infrastructure ==
Katherine Feser of the Houston Chronicle said that Robindell has always had an active civic club.

== Education ==
The Houston Independent School District operates public schools.

Part of Robindell is zoned to McNamara Elementary School, and part is zoned to Herod Elementary School. Part of Robindell is zoned to Sugar Grove Middle School, and part is zoned to Fondren Middle School. All of the community is zoned to Sharpstown High School.

Previously, part of the subdivision was zoned to Sharpstown Middle School.

== Media ==
The Bellaire Texan, which served the Robindell community during the mid-20th century, was headquartered in Bellaire and published by the Texan Publishing Corporation. By 1975 it became known as the Bellaire & Southwestern Texan and was published by the Preston Publishing Company. It was then headquartered in Houston.
