= Maplewood, Houston =

Community in Houston, Texas

Coordinates: 29.6824°N 95.4961°W

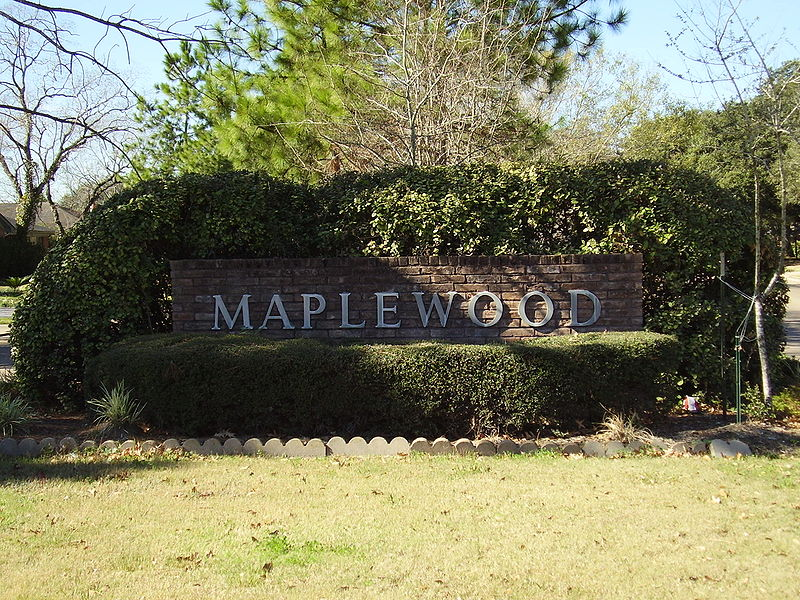
Maplewood

Maplewood is a community in Houston, Texas, located outside the 610 Loop, southwest of Downtown Houston. It consists of 524 houses. They are one-story and two-story houses, as two stories is the limit allowed by the subdivision. The oldest houses were built in the early 1950s. Maplewood is located along Beechnut, Hillcroft, and Renwick.

The Maplewood Civic Club (MCC) is the area civic club.

Maplewood is in Texas's 7th congressional district .

== History ==
Around 1988 Metropolitan Transit Authority of Harris County (METRO) proposed having Beechnut Street widened. Residents of Maplewood, Meyerland, and Robindell appeared before the METRO board and protested the plans, stating that they would result in increased traffic. METRO dropped the plans.

In April 2010 the City of Houston "automated" curbside recycling program was extended to Maplewood.

== Economy ==
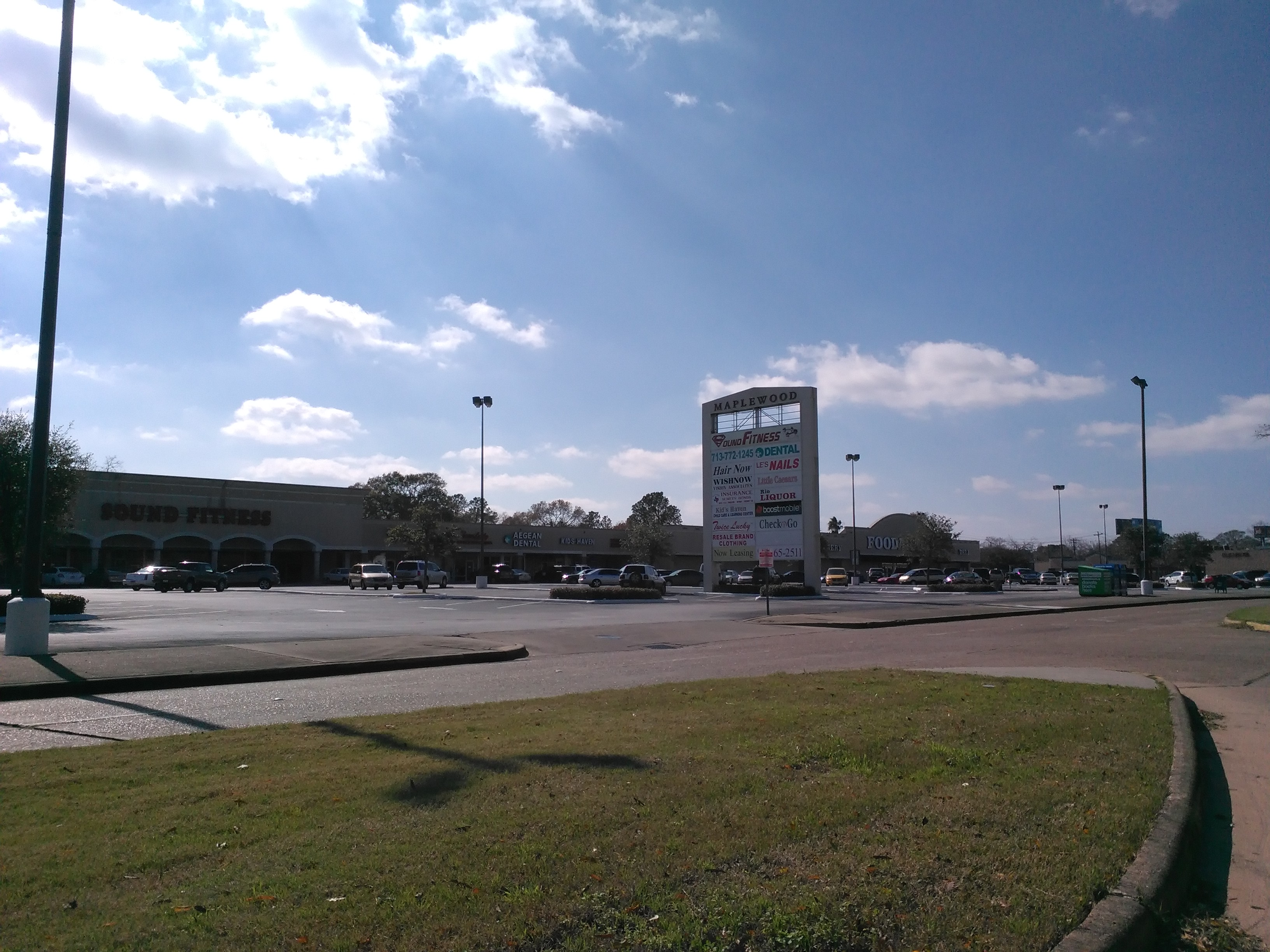
Maplewood Mall

Maplewood Mall, a 94,910-square-foot (8,817 m^{2}) outdoor shopping center, serves neighborhood residents. It opened in 1965 as an indoor shopping mall. In 2004 New Plan Excel Realty renovated the center and converted it from an indoor shopping mall to an outdoor shopping center. On August 6, 2004, it held a grand re-opening. 200 people, including Marvin Zindler, attended. All of the mall's previous tenants continued to occupy space in the refurbished development.

== Government and infrastructure ==
The neighborhood is within the Houston Police Department's Southwest Patrol Division .

Harris Health System (formerly Harris County Hospital District) designated Valbona Health Center (formerly People's Health Center) for ZIP code 77096. The nearest public hospital is Ben Taub General Hospital in the Texas Medical Center.

== Education ==
Maplewood is zoned to Houston ISD schools.

Maplewood is divided between the following elementary schools:

- Braeburn Elementary School
- Herod Elementary School
- Lovett Elementary School
- Sutton Elementary School

Maplewood is divided between the following middle schools:

- Fondren Middle School
- Long Middle School
- Pershing Middle School
  - Any portion zoned to Long or Pershing is eligible to apply for Pin Oak Middle School's regular program.

Areas east of Hillcroft (almost all of Maplewood) are zoned to Bellaire High School, while portions west of Hillcroft are zoned to Sharpstown High School.

Some areas thought as in the "Maplewood area" but are not within the subdivision limits (such as Maplewood South) are zoned to Westbury High School.

Prior to the 1980s oil bust Braeburn Elementary school had a middle class, White student body. After the oil bust, Central American immigrants moved into apartment complexes in the northern portion of Braeburn's attendance zone. By the year 1990 only 5% of Braeburn's 1,000 students were White. On April 29, 1992, a petition to have the neighborhood rezoned to Herod, a mostly-White high performing school, circulated in the southern portion of Braeburn's attendance zone. The area board member, Donald R. McAdams, did not support the proposal, and the request was not approved. McAdams, the author of Fighting to Save Our Urban Schools-- and Winning!: Lessons from Houston, wrote that he did not support the proposal because the area demanding a rezone was across the street from Braeburn to the south and west and that "Moving this neighborhood to Herod would acknowledge that middle-class white [sic] children were not expected to go to a school filled with poor Hispanic children, even when the school was directly across the street." In addition, at that time Herod was overcrowded.

Nearby Catholic schools of the Roman Catholic Archdiocese of Galveston-Houston include St. Vincent de Paul Catholic School, K-8.
