= Sharpstown High School =

High school in Texas, United States

Coordinates: 29.68456°N 95.51511°W

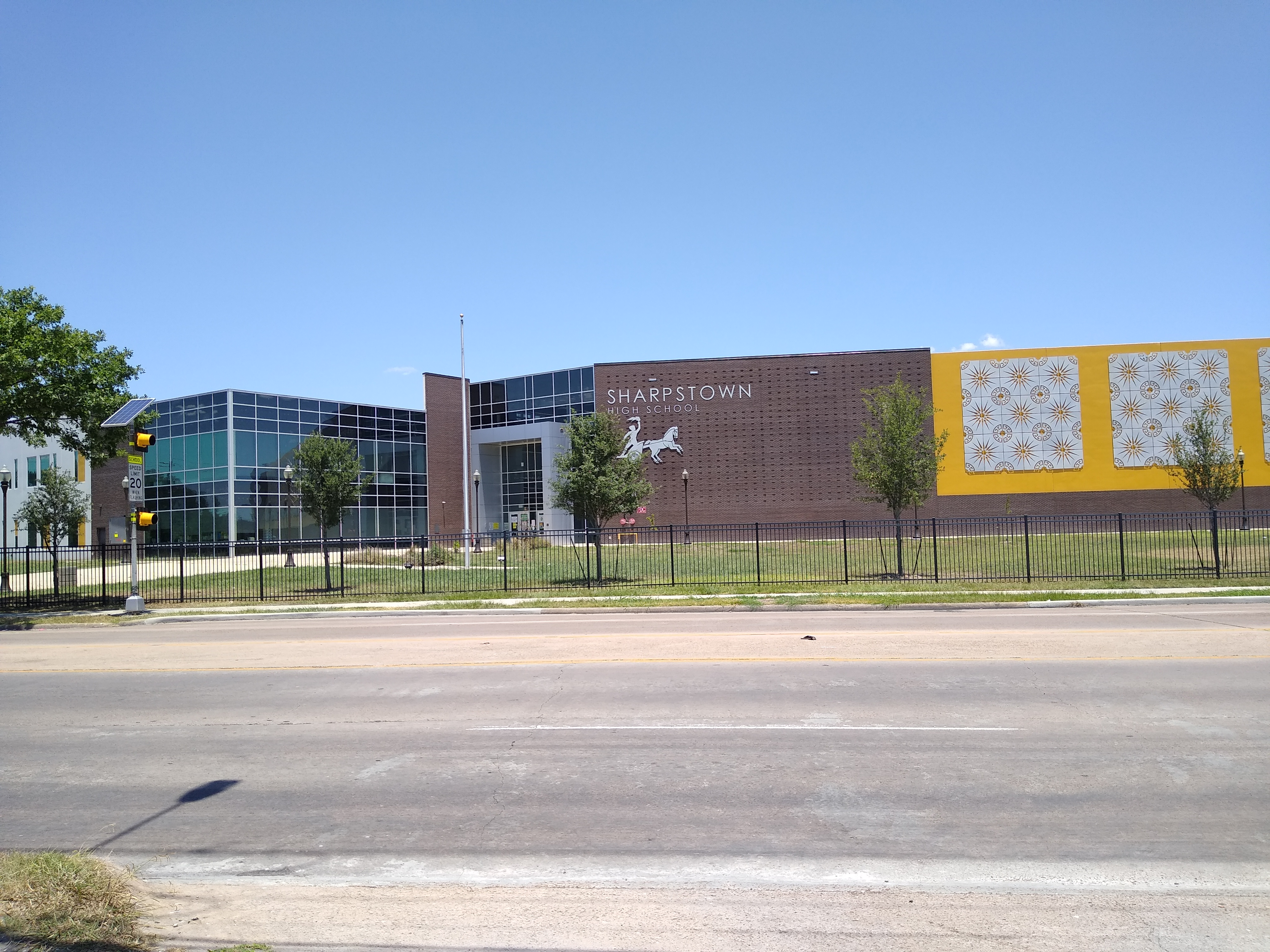

Location
- 7504 Bissonnet Street; Houston, (Harris County), Texas 77074; United States

Information
- Type: Public high school
- Principal: T.J. Cotter
- Staff: 97.27 (FTE)
- Enrollment: 1,855 (2022-23)
- Student to teacher ratio: 19.07
- Colors: Green and gold
- Nickname: Apollos
- Website: sharpstown.houstonisd.org

Sharpstown High School is a secondary school at 7504 Bissonnet Street in Greater Sharpstown in Houston, Texas, United States with a zip code of 77074. It serves grades 9 through 12 and is a part of the Houston Independent School District.

The school serves part of Sharpstown, which was Houston's first master-planned community. Additionally, it serves the neighborhoods of Robindell, Braeburn Glen, Braeburn Terrace, Braeburn Valley, Braeburn Valley West, and parts of Fondren Southwest.Sharpstown International School, an alternative secondary school, was on Sharpstown High School's campus from fall 2007 to fall 2010.

== History ==
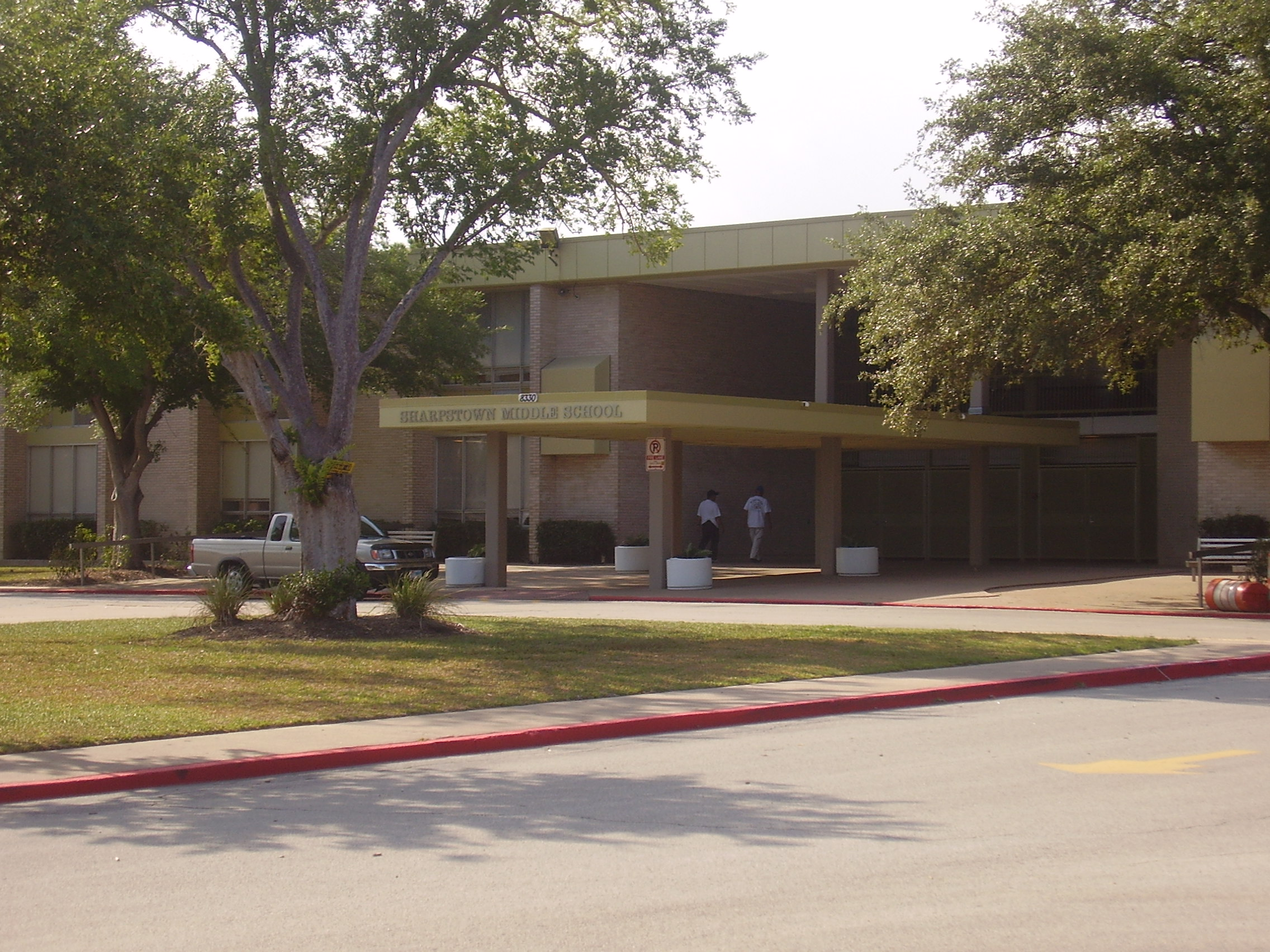
The original campus for Sharpstown Junior-Senior High School. This facility is now Sharpstown International School.

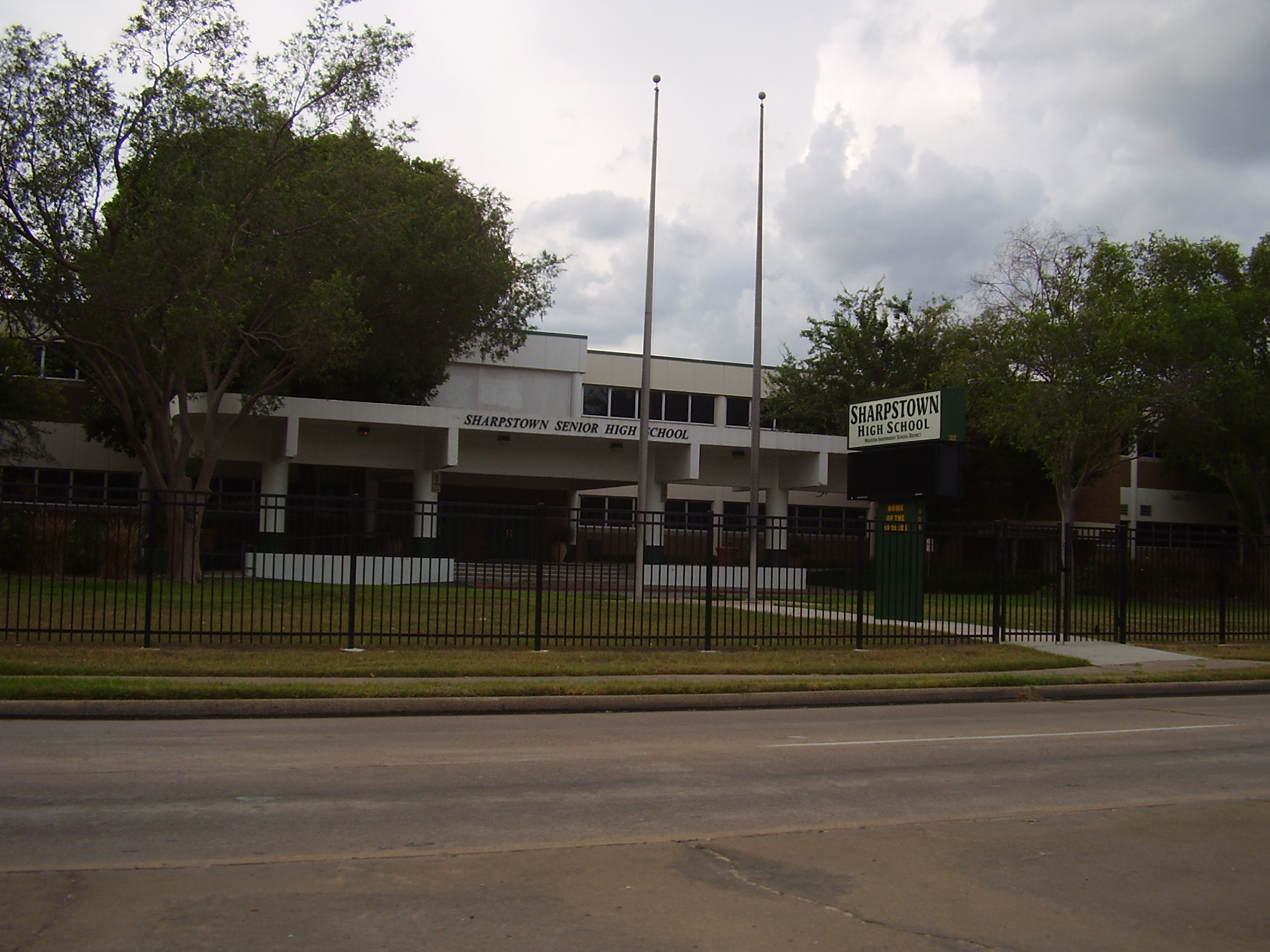
Former Sharpstown High School

Sharpstown Junior-Senior High School opened in 1968 in the campus now occupied by Sharpstown International School. In 1969, the junior and senior high schools separated, with the senior high going into a new campus.

In 2011 Sharpstown International School took attendance boundaries from Lee High School and Sharpstown High School. As of 2012, Sharpstown International School has no boundary, with Sharpstown High School controlling its former high school boundary.

=== Race riot ===
During the final day of school around 11 a.m. June 2, 1988, three African-American teenagers attacked a white football player in an Algebra class. The fight grew to 100 participants with around 400 students watching the race riot. Sixteen police cars and one helicopter traveled to the school, and police closed Bissonnet Street for 45 minutes. Two students were hospitalized at Southwest Memorial Hospital. Police identified the main perpetrator as a 17-year-old former student who was expelled in 1987. Police said that he, along with two students, armed themselves with a nail-studded stick and a chain and looked for a target in revenge for an incident two months earlier, when a white football player beat two black students. The Algebra teacher pressed a panic button, but it did not work as they were turned off. The teacher sent a student to report the incident.

A 1988 Houston Chronicle article written one day after the brawl stated that Sharpstown had a history of racial tension. Deborah Tedford and Burke Watson of the Houston Chronicle wrote that "The Sharpstown campus has been plagued with outbursts of violence during school year — with parents taking to the halls as volunteer security monitors in November to quell disturbances." Gayle Fallon, president of the Houston Federation of Teachers, criticized the school. Fallon said that the school should have taken more precautionary measures to ensure a racially motivated fight did not happen. Larry Yawn, an HISD spokesperson, and principal Don Carlisle said the officials were not aware of rumors about an upcoming fight.

In spring 1991, as a result of the 1988 scuffle, Carlisle prohibited students from wearing Confederate States of America-related clothing at the May 17 prom. Five white students faced ejection when they were found with the clothing; some white students criticized the school, saying that it had a double standard as it allowed African-American students to wear Malcolm X-related clothing. The same students said that racial tensions had decreased from 1988 levels.

=== 90s, 00s, and Katrina evacuees ===
In January 1991 a fire destroyed two portable classrooms; police believed that the fire, extinguished in 20 minutes, was arson. The damages were estimated to be from $50,000 to $75,000.

In September 1991 when Sharpstown increased its student parking fee from $40 to $50, some students threatened to walk out of school. The school administration wanted a magnet program to encourage area students to attend the school. By 1995 the school received a community service program.

In 2001 the campus received a $13 million renovation, with a new air conditioning system. According to the Houston Independent School District October 2006 "For Your Information" newsletter, Sharpstown was one of four high schools which took in the most Hurricane Katrina evacuees.

=== Performance and dropout rates ===
A 2003 state audit of HISD's performance caused controversy. One of the district's most publicized accomplishments during the Rod Paige era was a dramatic reduction in dropout rates. When 16 secondary schools, including Sharpstown High School, were audited, it was found that most of the students who left those schools in 2000-2001 should have been counted as dropouts but were not. It was found that the administrators at Sharpstown deliberately changed the dropout rate. The Sharpstown controversy resulted in a recommendation to label the entire HISD as "unacceptable." Former Sharpstown assistant principal Robert Kimball asserts that HISD coerced administrators at many schools to lie on dropout rates. HISD asserts that the fraud is only contained to Sharpstown and that the false statistics at other schools were caused by confusion related to the state's system of tracking students who leave school.

In 2007, a Johns Hopkins University study cited Sharpstown as a "dropout factory" where at least 40% of the entering freshman class does not make it to their senior year. During that year 41% of high-school-age children zoned to Sharpstown chose to attend a different Houston ISD school. From 2002 to 2009, the graduating rate increased from 73.5% to 75.4%. Gretchen Gavett of Frontline said that the gain was "small." By 2010, Sharpstown High School had improved to a 587th U.S. national ranking. Texas Governor Rick Perry held a press conference on August 24, 2010 at Sharpstown HS to discuss education initiatives.

Sharpstown was the focus of a PBS Frontline episode called "Dropout Nation," about a program implemented at Sharpstown to prevent dropouts. The episode followed four Sharpstown students at risk of dropping out.

=== Youth criminal gangs ===
Charles Rotramel, the owner of the nonprofit program Youth Advocates, stated in a 2006 Houston Chronicle article that Lee High School, Westbury High School, and Sharpstown High School have suffered from the actions of youth criminal gangs. By January 2006, on one internet bulletin board, gangs stated that they "run" Sharpstown High School; Terry Abbott, the Houston ISD spokesperson, denied all such statements.

=== 2010s ===
In 2012 the nonprofit Children at Risk ranked Sharpstown High as the second best "urban" (meaning a school with 50% or more of its student body being low income) comprehensive high school in the Houston area.

In 2013 principal Rob Gasparello was charged by Harris County prosecutors with three counts of failing to report child abuse, and therefore he stayed off campus all year. In October of that year prosecutors dropped the charges, telling him that if he does not get into further legal trouble they would not charge him. In February 2015 HISD reassigned Gasparello after he was accused of hitting several students. In 2016 the board of education decided to terminate Gasparello's employment.

A new Sharpstown High School facility opened in 2018.

== Campus ==
By 1996 there were thirty-nine temporary buildings due to overcrowding, housing over 50% of the students on campus at a time, and the library also held classes. At that stage some teachers did not have their own dedicated classrooms. The building features were wearing out during that period. A bond passed in 1989, Renewal A, meant that the toilets had already been renovated by that time.

== Demographics ==
As of 2003 the school had 1,650 students, most of them Hispanic and Latino, and African American. As of 2012 92% of the students were classified as low income.

== 2022 Rankings ==
- #10,384 in National Rankings
- #921 in Texas High Schools
- #165 in Houston, TX Metro Area High Schools
- #27 in Houston Independent School District High Schools

== Extracurricular activities ==
=== Athletics ===
As of 2009-2010, the Apollo football program is headed up by Coach Devin Heasley, and Coordinators Isaiah Johnson (Defense) and Jeff Whitehall (Offense). They rank number 2 in their district. The 2011-2012 Apollo football program won their first district championship in school history (6-0) record with Dallas Blacklock as their head coach.

=== JROTC ===
In 1996 and 1998, the Armed Drill Team "The Phantom Silent Drill Team" won 1st place in a state competition at the Bluebonnet Drill Meet. In 2001, the team also won 2nd and 3rd overall in a National Drill Meet competition, which included 60 schools nationwide. Making this the first time in HISD history, a JROTC school has placed at a national level.

=== Apollo Queens Dance and Drill Team ===
The Apollo Queens Dance and Drill team was established when Sharpstown Senior High School opened, its first line in 1968 under the direction of Bettye Yeager. One of a kind in their uniforms with a cape and wreath crown (a nod to Apollo, the school mascot), the Apollo Queens quickly established themselves as the "lights of the Southwest", garnering praise from many far and wide.

The Apollo Queens began to participate in Texas wide dance and drill team competitions in the mid-70's, earning many superior and sweepstakes ratings as a team and for their officer line. During the mid 1980's to the mid 1990's, Sharpstown's Apollo Queens were constantly in the spotlight of the dance community, representing forward thinking dance and choosing routines that stepped outside the box. The Apollo Queens were featured on the NCA Superstar magazine cover.

In 2020, the Apollo Queens were led by director Aislinn Garza during the COVID-19 pandemic. Despite the challenges of the pandemic, the Apollo Queens were able to bring home a first place title in Lyrical and Pom during the Marching Auxiliaries Virtual Contests as well as a superior rating for Officers.

== Feeder patterns ==
Elementary schools which feed into Sharpstown High School include:

- Bonham
- McNamara
- Herod (partial)
- Milne (partial)
- Sutton (partial)
- Valley West (partial)

Middle schools which feed into Sharpstown High School include:

- Sugar Grove
- Fondren M. S. (partial)
- Long (partial)
- Welch (partial)

Since any student zoned to Long may attend Pin Oak Middle School, Pin Oak also feeds into Sharpstown High School.

== Notable alumni ==
- Joseph Addai - retired National Football League running back for the Indianapolis Colts Super Bowl XLI Champion, BCS National Championship LSU Tigers 2001, Pro Bowl 2007
- Eric Anthony - retired Major League Baseball player for the Houston Astros, Seattle Mariners, Cincinnati Reds, Colorado Rockies, and Los Angeles Dodgers, also played for the Yakult Swallows
- Robert Earl Keen - singer and songwriter
- David McCarty - former MLB player for the Minnesota Twins
- Adrian Hernandez - professional opera singer for the Houston Grand Opera.
- Luke Prestridge - retired NFL punter for the Denver Broncos and New England Patriots
- Margaret Spellings was the United States Secretary of Education under President George W. Bush during his second term in office (Class of 1975).
- Forest "Greg" Swindell - retired MLB pitcher for the Cleveland Indians, Houston Astros, Minnesota Twins, Boston Red Sox, and Arizona Diamondbacks
- Barret Robbins - retired NFL center who played nine seasons for the Oakland Raiders 1995-2003. Pro Bowl (2002), All-Pro (2002), Class of 1991
- Aaron Laing - retired NFL tight end who played for the San Diego Chargers and St. Louis Rams 1994-1998, Class of 1989,
- Nathan Kampf - sound designer / artist
