= Newcastle High School =

Newcastle High School can refer to:

- Newcastle High School (Nebraska) in Newcastle, Nebraska
- Newcastle High School (Oklahoma) in Newcastle, Oklahoma
- Newcastle High School (Texas) in Newcastle, Texas
- Newcastle High School (Wyoming) in Newcastle, Wyoming
- Newcastle High School (Australia) in Newcastle, New South Wales
- Newcastle-under-Lyme School, a school in Newcastle-under-Lyme, England
- Newcastle High School (KwaZulu-Natal) in Newcastle, KwaZulu-Natal, South Africa
- Central Newcastle High School, an independent all-girls school in Newcastle upon Tyne

== See also ==
- New Castle High School (disambiguation)
