= Sharpstown, Houston =

Community in Houston, Texas

Coordinates: 29.700°N 95.535°W

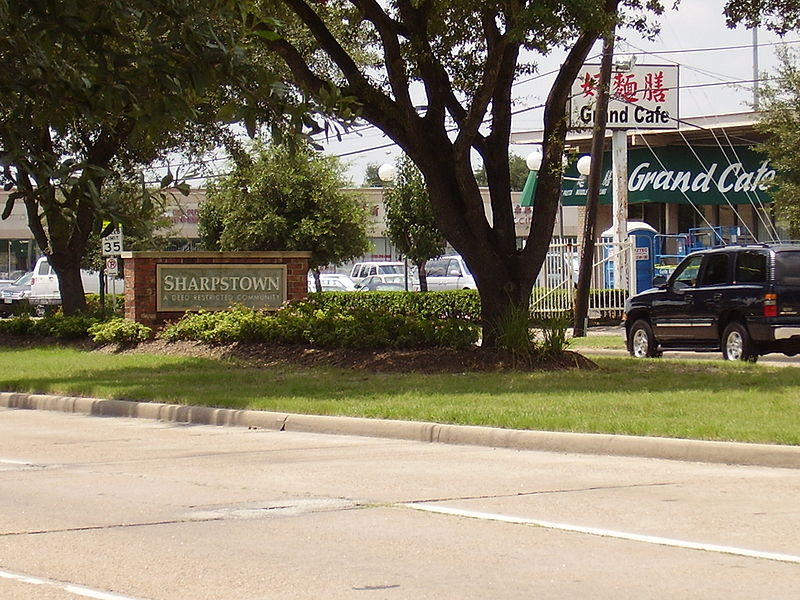
A sign in a median indicating Sharpstown

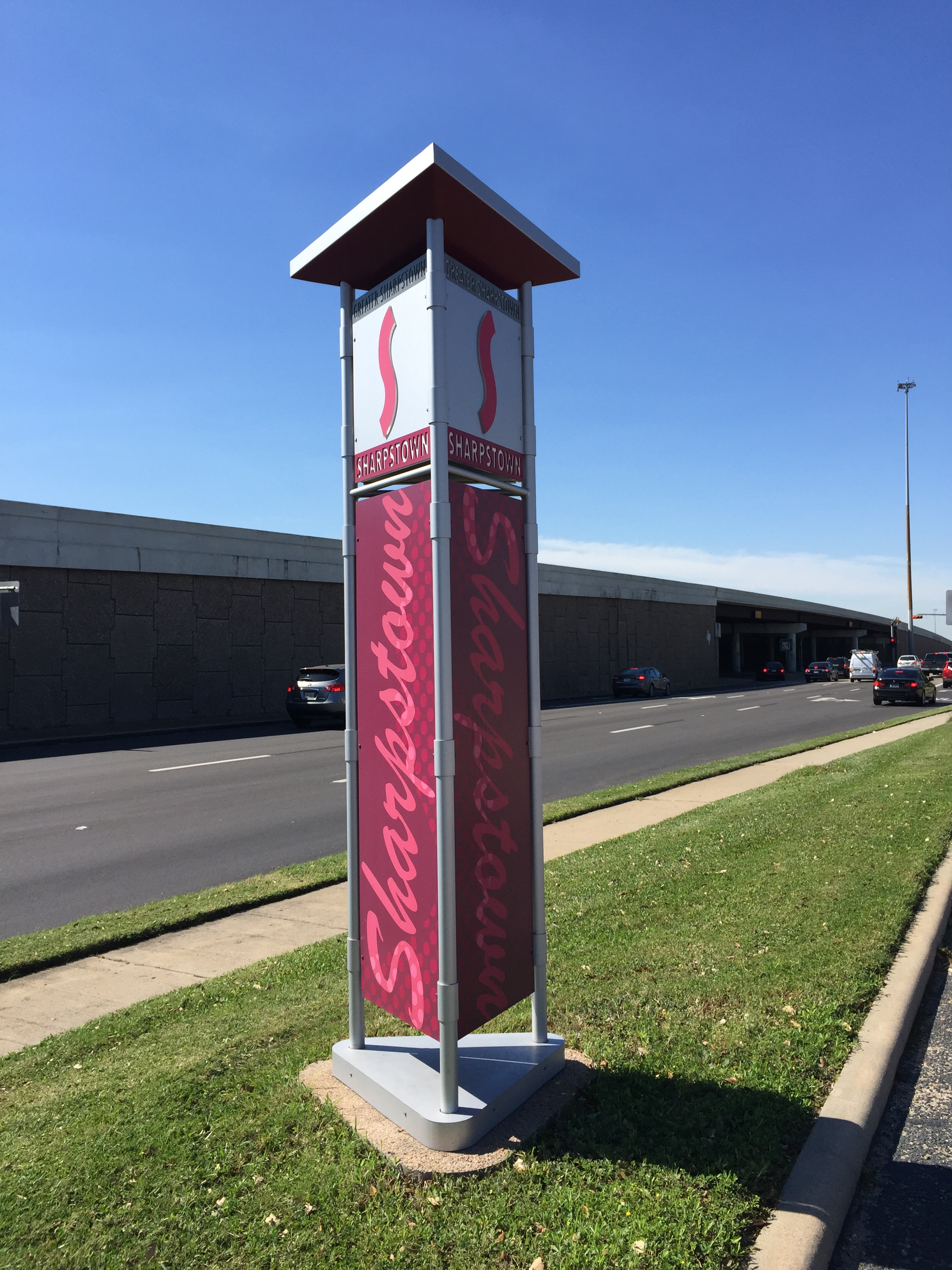
Sharpstown sign from the Greater Sharpstown Management District (now the Southwest Management District)

Sharpstown is a master-planned community in the Southwest Management District (formerly Greater Sharpstown), Southwest Houston, Texas. It was one of the first communities to be built as a master-planned, automobile centered community and the first in Houston. Frank Sharp (1906–1993), the developer of the subdivision, made provisions not only for homes but also for schools, shopping and recreation areas. While this model has been duplicated countless times in the past fifty years, at the time it was quite revolutionary, attracting national media attention. The development was dedicated on March 13, 1955.

== Overview ==
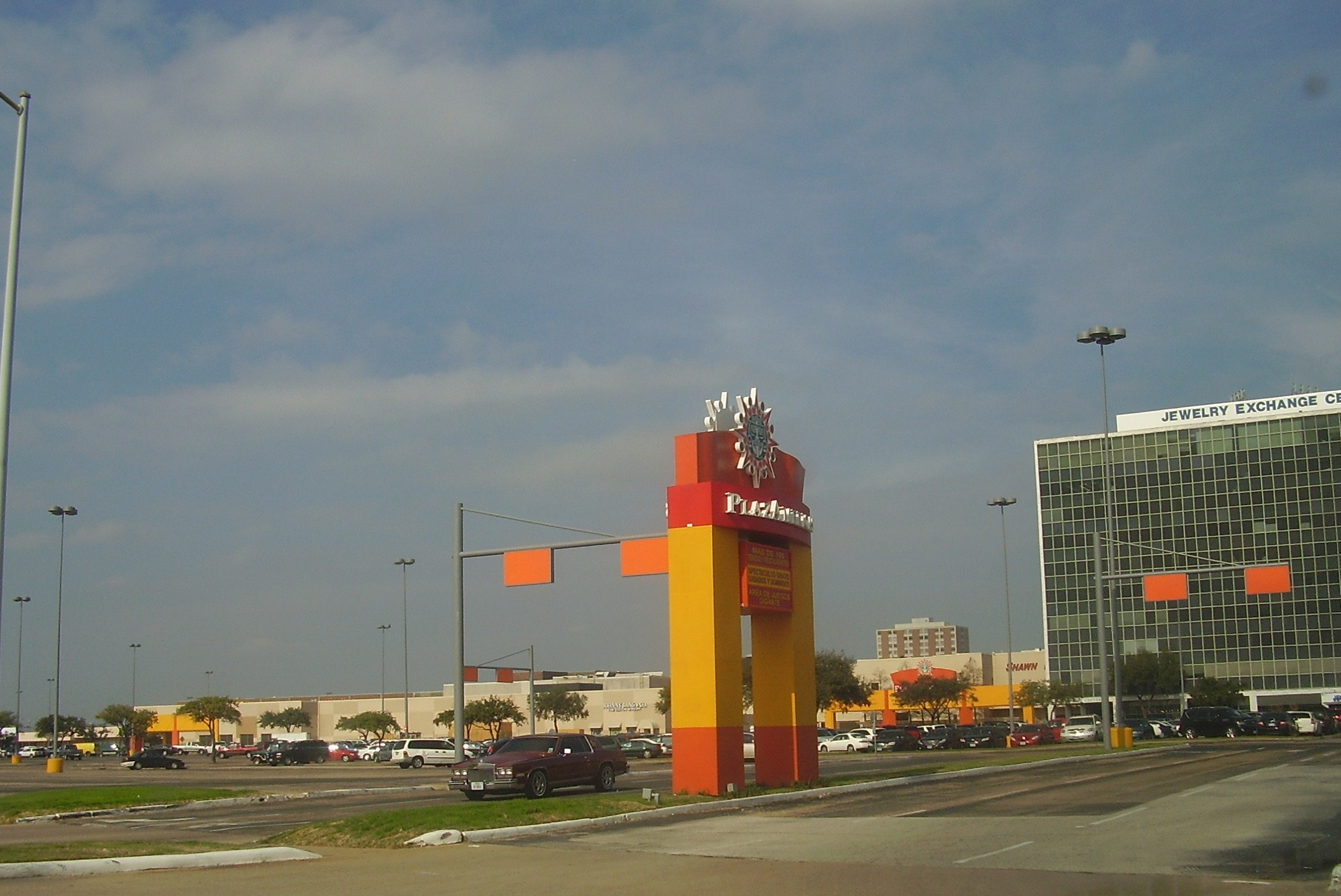
PlazAmericas (formerly Sharpstown Center and Sharpstown Mall)

The residential architecture in Sharpstown consists of post–World War II bungalows, modern and traditional homes. The materials used in building these homes were of sound quality and have withstood the wear and tear of the baby boomer generation as well as the test of time.

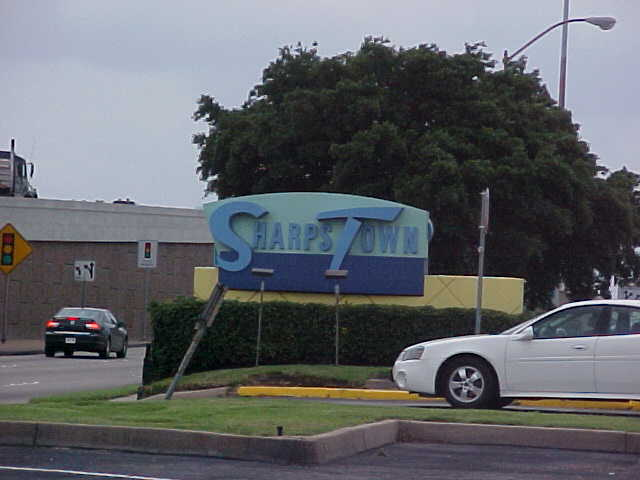
Sharpstown Mall sign

== History ==
Sharp donated a 300-foot-wide strip of land through the development to the state of Texas for construction of the Southwest Freeway (Interstate 69/U.S. Highway 59). This ensured easy access from Downtown Houston to homes in the neighborhood, as well as to Sharpstown Center, Houston's first air-conditioned, enclosed shopping mall, now known as PlazAmericas.

From the 1980 U.S. Census to the 1990 Census, many African-Americans left traditional African-American neighborhoods and entered parts of Southwest Houston such as Sharpstown. The Hispanic population increased by an amount between 1,000 and 3,500 per square mile. Many Asian-Americans also moved into the Sharpstown area, creating one of the largest concentrations of Asian-Americans in Houston. Glenda Kay Joe, an Asian community leader, said in a 1991 Houston Chronicle article that the Sharpstown Civic Association and the Southwest Advocate newspaper opposed Asian-American settlement in Sharpstown. According to Joe, once Sharpstown residents became accustomed with Asian immigrants, the opposition disappeared.

Sharpstown was affected by the Sharpstown scandal. The scandal combined with a set of apartment complexes that became run-down ensured that Sharpstown became a neighborhood surrounded by crime by the mid-to-late 1990s. Crime increased in the 1990s with the deterioration of area apartment complexes.

A 1992 Houston Chronicle article described Sharpstown as "a racially mixed neighborhood with a strong Vietnamese community."

With Sharpstown's close-in location, there is renewed interest in revitalizing the neighborhood. In 2005, median home prices in Sharpstown had roughly doubled since 2000.

In a 2007 Houston Press article journalist John Nova Lomax said "residential Sharpstown never changes" and that "the houses are still decent and the apartments still rotten."

In 2010, Mary Ellen Carroll, a conceptual artist who taught at Rice University's School of Architecture realized Phase I of the work prototype 180. The catalytic moment was the 180 degree revolution of the single-family home and its surrounding lot at 6513 Sharpview in Sharpstown Section I. prototype 180 occupies architecture to make it perform, albeit as a work of art. It is a collection of processes that utilize land-use policy or no zoning, and the lack thereof in Houston as a material condition and is an example of 'considered urbanism'. The site functions as a visible museum of post-war planned communities and architectural interventions. prototype 180 raises questions regarding planning and policy in aging first ring developments.

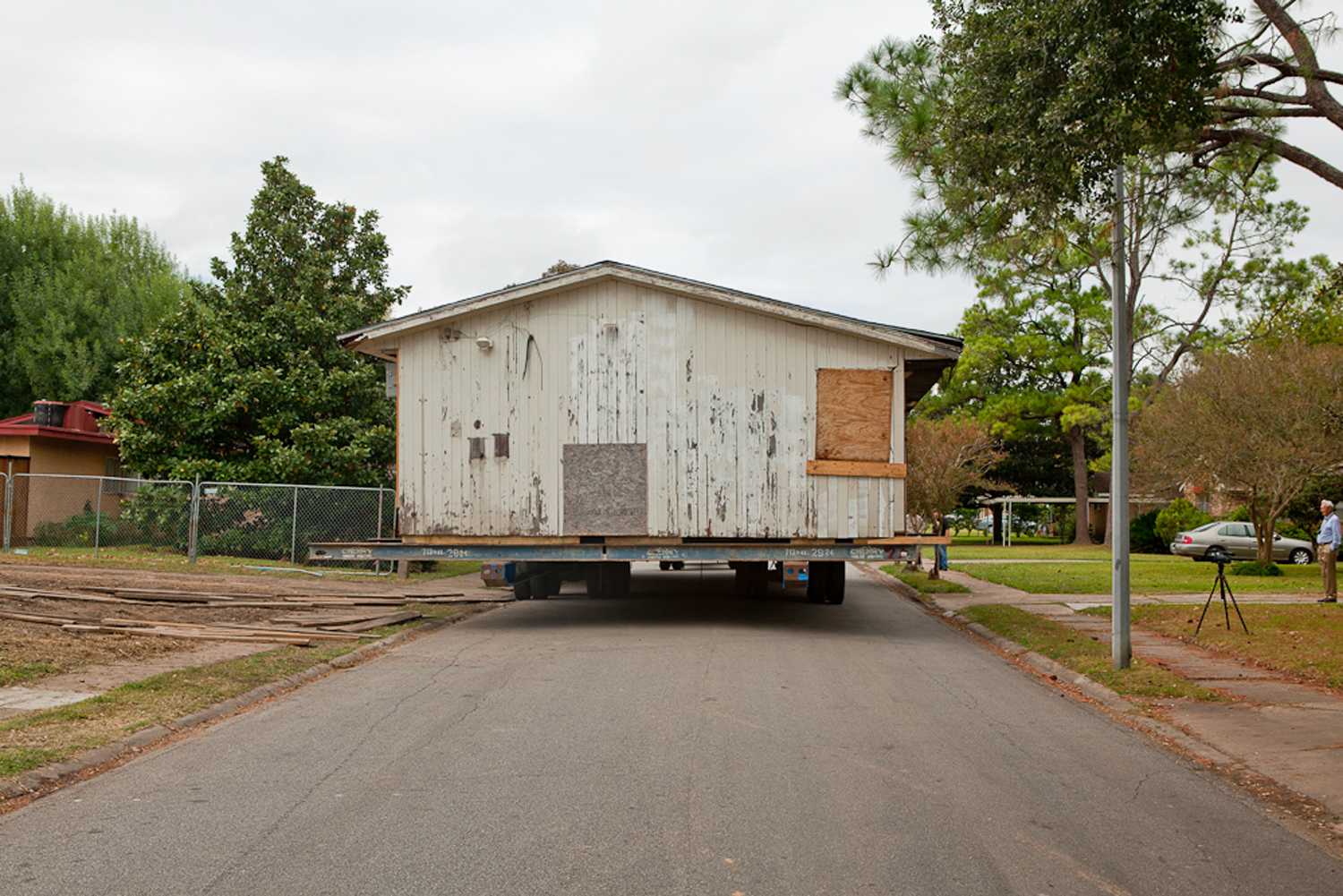
The 180 degree revolution of 6513 Sharpview to make the single family home perform as a work of art that is a collection of processes as a public museum in a single family home. www.prototype180.org

In 2017, the structure that had been compromised during Hurricane Harvey was 'unbuilt' in a performance on November 11, 2017 in front of an invited, live public audience for Phase II of prototype 180. The unbuilding of the structure was titled Daringly Unbuilt and was introduced by the Charles Renfro, a partner in the firm Diller, Scofidio + Renfro and the performance artist Joseph Keckler sang a requiem accompanied by the acclaimed violinist Rubén Rengel.

Phase III for prototype 180 will be the rebuilding of the structure that will be done with a proprietary process that incorporates a substrate made by reconstituting the salvaged building materials to rebuild the original structure and the creation of an ethno-botanic garden in the land surrounding the structure.

During the same year the Houston Press named Sharpstown the 2010 "Best Hidden Neighborhood." The Houston Press stated that Sharpstown "is less a "hidden" neighborhood than it is one that's undervalued and underrated." In 2013 Houstonia magazine stated that Sharpstown was one of the "25 Hottest Neighborhoods" in Houston.

== Cityscape ==
Sharpstown has a lot of mid-century style houses on large lots.

== Government and infrastructure ==
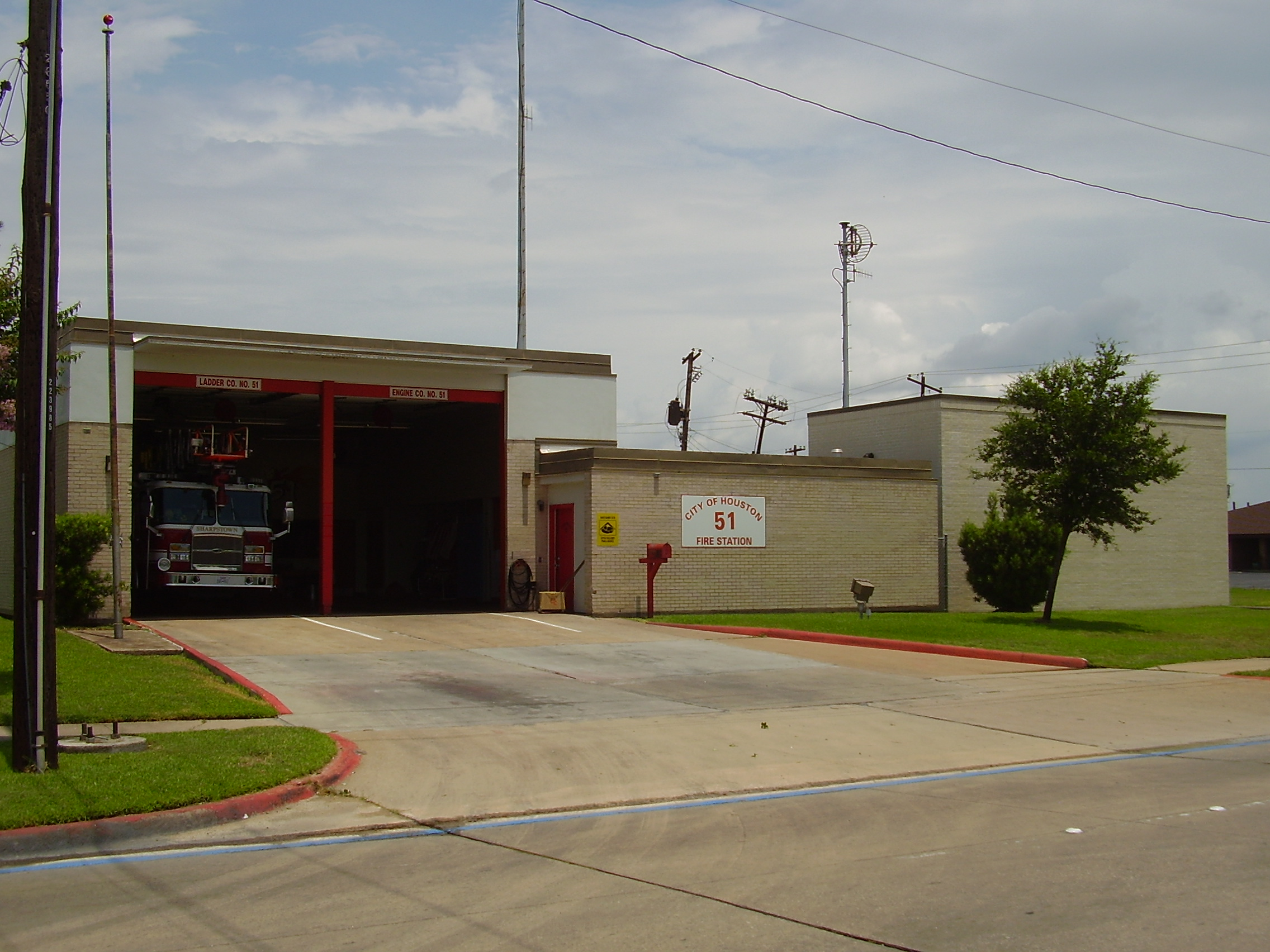
Fire Station 51 Sharpstown

The Houston Fire Department operates the Fire Station 51 Sharpstown along Bellaire Boulevard, a part of Fire District 68. Station 51 opened in 1962. Since then it had two facelifts and a renovation in the financial year of 1999.

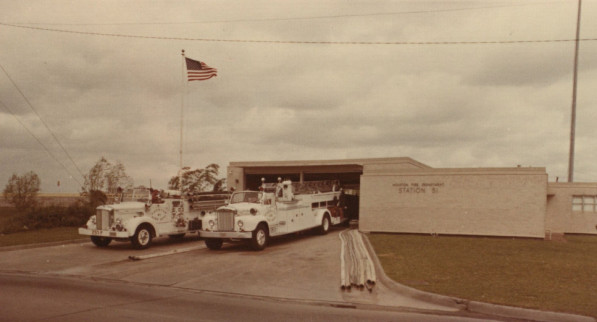
Fire Station 51, 1976

After the 2012 redristricting process, Sharpstown is split between Texas's 7th congressional district and Texas's 9th congressional district

The neighborhood is served by two Houston Police Department patrol divisions. Areas north and west of Interstate 69/U.S. Route 59 are served by the Midwest Patrol Division. Areas south and east of I-69/U.S. 59 are served by the Fondren Patrol Division. The portion that is now in the Midwest Patrol Division was formerly in the Westside Patrol Division. At one time the police department operated the Sharpstown-area police storefront at Bellaire Boulevard at Rogerdale.

The City of Houston Health Department operates the Sharpstown Health Services clinic. Harris Health System (formerly Harris County Hospital District) designated Valbona Health Center (formerly People's Health Center) in Greater Sharpstown for ZIP code 77074. The nearest public hospital is Ben Taub General Hospital in the Texas Medical Center.

=== Political representation ===
The City of Houston instituted the current nine city council districts in 1979. Sharpstown has been districted in District F since 1980. District council members elected to the Houston City Council have been past presidents of the Sharpstown Civic Association – John Goodner (1980–1993), Ray Driscoll (1994–1999), Mark Ellis (2000–2003), M.J. Khan (2004–2010), and Aloysius Hoang (2010/11 – prior to the City of Houston redistricting). As of 2011, Sharpstown was redistricted into District J where Mike Laster is the newly elected council member.

Houston City Council District J now covers Sharpstown. District J was created to allow Hispanics to more easily elect representatives who cater to them. Robert Jara, a political consultant of the group Campaign Strategies, drew the boundaries of District J in order to ensure that Sharpstown and Gulfton were together in one area. That way, the Hispanic residents could lobby for influence with their city council representative, whether he or she is of Hispanic origin or not. City Council District F previously covered Sharpstown. As of 2008 M. J. Khan represented the district.

In 1989, during a city council race, many in Sharpstown voted for Jim Westmoreland for an at-large position. In one precinct 68.5 percent of the voting residents voted for him. Westmoreland drew controversy after reports of a joke that was characterized as racist spread. Westmoreland was defeated in that race. In a 1989 Houston Chronicle article, Nancy Palm, a Republican Party activist from western Houston, said that the residents who voted for Westmoreland had social ties with them and did not see the controversy as significant. In the first 1991 Mayor of Houston election most Sharpstown voters voted for Bob Lanier. By December 3, 1991, increases in crime and changes of demographics in southwestern Houston neighborhoods lead to many challengers desiring to fill the city council seat of District F. In 2005 Khan promoted an anti-graffiti campaign in Sharpstown and other communities in his district.

== Culture, parks, and recreation ==
The city operates Sharpstown Park and the Sharpstown Golf Course along Bellaire Boulevard, in Sharpstown Country Club Estates Harbor Town Addition. In 2003 Wendy Grossman of the Houston Press said that the course "looks like a rundown city park with yellow paint chipping off the curb." The course has an on-site pro shop and an on-site restaurant behind the shop. An employee in the on-site pro shop stated that Sharpstown Park Golf Course was the flattest course in the city. The golf course first opened in the 1950s as the Sharpstown Country Club Golf Course. At the time it housed fifty sand traps, five lakes, and a special kind of grass. The lakes had bass and perch. In 1964 the $50,000 Houston Golf Classic was at the golf course. In 1976, the owners of the course had not made a payment on their $5 million mortgage in five years, leading to the course's closure. The City of Houston proceeded to buy about two-thirds of the course two years later; real estate developers bought the rest of the course. The course is the home course of the Wisdom High School golf team; the school is about 4 miles (6.4 km) from the course.

The city operates the Sharpstown Green Park at 6300 Sharpview Drive. The city operates the Sharpstown Community Center at 6600 Harbor Town Drive.

Bonham Park, a city park, is in Sharpstown original Section 3. E. L. Crain Park, another city park, is in Sharpstown Country Club Terrace Section 3. Lansdale Park is in Country Club Terrace Section 2.

Sharpstown has a little league called Sharpstown Little League that plays at Bayland Park.

In 2007, the group Neighborhood Centers Inc. announced that it would build the Gulfton Neighborhood Campus at the intersection of Rookin Street and High Star Drive when it raises $20 million. The Baker-Ripley Neighborhood Center opened in 2010 and now offers a wide range of services including after school programs, a medical clinic, financial center, fitness classes, and ESL.

== Sections ==
=== Original sections ===
Sharpstown Sections 1, 1A, 2, 3, and 5 form the original sections of Sharpstown.

=== Sharpstown Country Club Estates ===
Sharpstown Country Club Estates is a set of two sections in Sharpstown. It was developed in the late 1950s by the Sharpstown expansion west of the Southwest Freeway by Frank Sharp. The neighborhood is next to the Sharpstown Golf Course and west of PlazAmericas (formerly Sharpstown Center and Sharpstown Mall).

Sharpstown Country Club Estates was named after the Sharpstown Country Club (now Sharpstown Park and Golf Course) that was east and west of the neighborhood after 1955, Sharpstown CCE surrounded the country club. The neighborhood is known as one of the quietest sections of Houston by its residents. The neighborhood is divided into two sections, Sharpstown Country Club Estates East and Sharpstown Country Club Estates West. Sharpstown Country Club Estates attracted middle to upper class citizens who were involved at the Sharpstown Country Club.

The sections are Country Club Estates 2 and Country Club Estates 3.

=== Sharpstown Country Club Terrace ===
Sharpstown Country Club Terrace includes Country Club Terrace 1, Country Club Terrace 2, and Country Club Terrace 3.

As of 2016 the section included mid-century modern houses, bungalows built in the post-World War II style, and traditional ranch houses. There were houses worth almost $300,000 which had new appliances and features, while those under $200,000, in the words of Nancy Sarnoff of the Houston Chronicle, "generally require some fixing up." From 2011 to 2015 the median price per square foot of the houses in Sharpstown Country Club Terrace increased by 54%.

== Education ==
=== Colleges and universities ===
Houston City College System serves Sharpstown.

Houston Christian University, a private university, is located in Sharpstown Section 3A.

The Saint Constantine School, a private Orthodox Christian school and college, is located in Section 1.

=== Primary and secondary education ===
==== Public schools ====
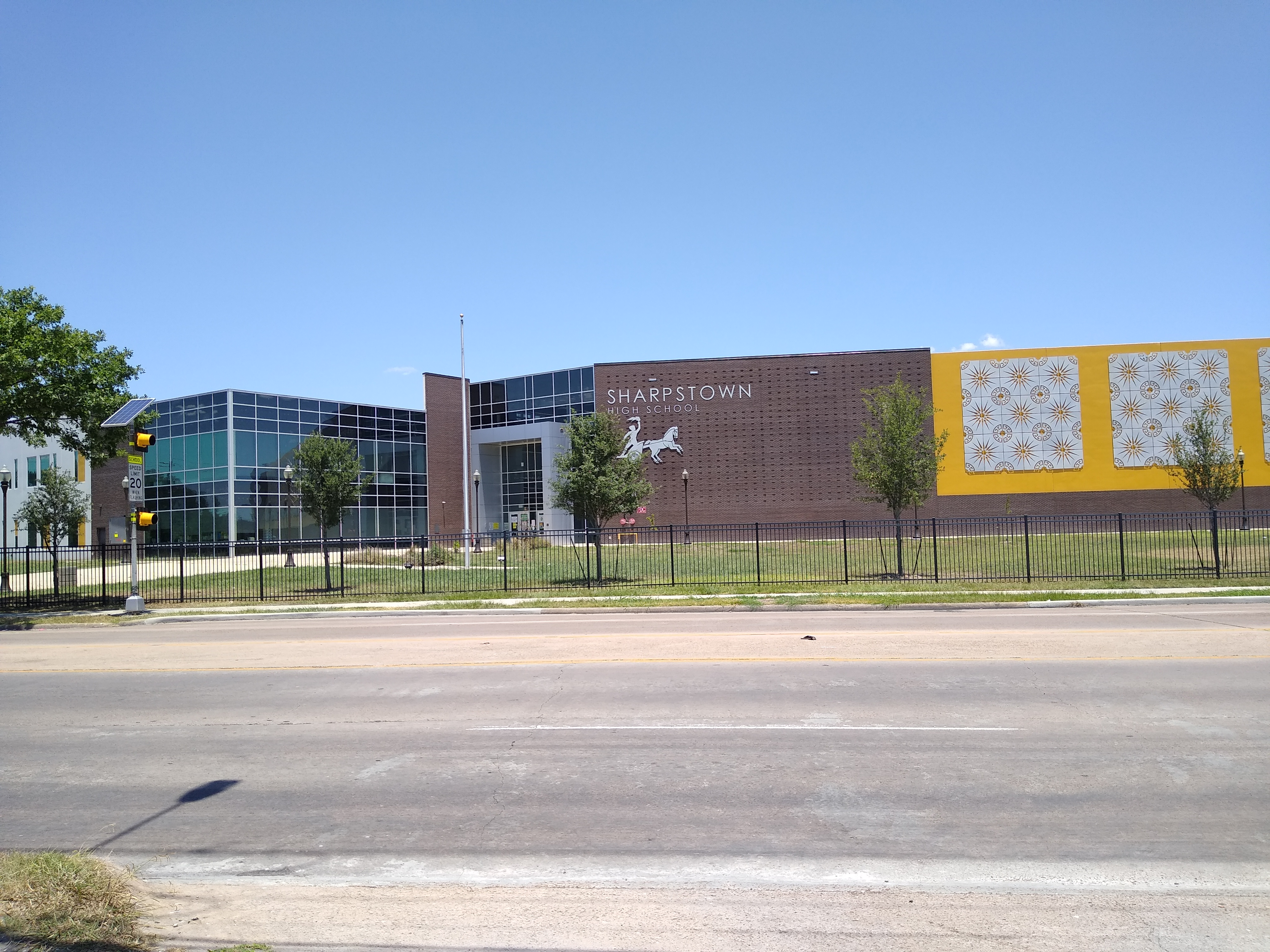
Sharpstown High School

Sharpstown is served by several schools in the Houston Independent School District.

Sutton Elementary school serves original sections 1, 1A, and 2. James Butler Bonham Elementary School, located in original section 3, serves most of original section 3, while McNamara Elementary School, outside of Sharpstown, serves a portion of original section 3.

Neff Elementary School serves original section 5, Estates 2, Terrace 1, most of Estates 3, and almost all of Terrace 2. The current Neff campus is in Country Club Estates Section 2, as was its previous one. Ed White Elementary School, in Terrace 3, serves Terrace 3 and a small portion of Terrace 2. Ralph Waldo Emerson Elementary School, outside of Sharpstown, serves sections of Estates 3.

Sands Point Elementary School, serving as a relief school, was named after Sands Point Drive in Sharpstown Country Club Estates.

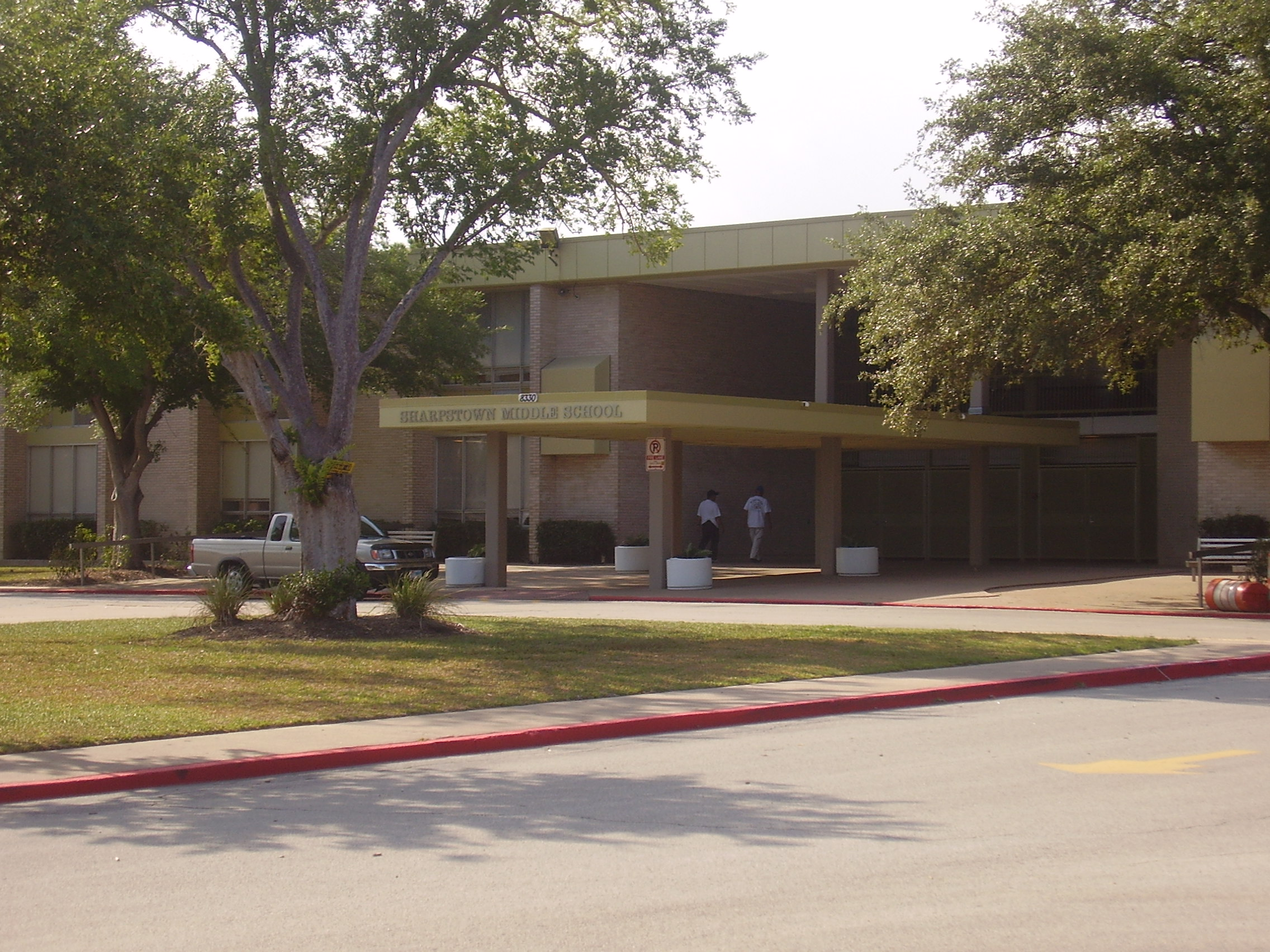
Sharpstown International School

Jane Long Academy in Sharpstown (any student zoned to Long may apply to Pin Oak Middle School's regular program) serves original sections 1, 1A, and 2 for middle school.

Sugar Grove Middle School, located in Section 3, serves original section 3, original section 5, all three Terrace sections, Estates 2, and most of Estates 3. In the period 2009 to 2019, the school had "improvement required" ratings from the State of Texas for four of those years. Each year, about 37% of the teachers present in one school year are not in the next. There were five principals in a period circa 2009 to 2019. Circa 2014, 925 students in the Sugar Grove attendance zone attended schools other than Sugar Grove middle. This increased to 1,200 circa 2019.

Sharpstown High School serves original sections 1, 1A, 2, and 3, original section 5, all three Terrace sections, Estates 2, and most of Estates 3.

A portion of Sharpstown Country Club Estates 3 is zoned to Revere Middle School and Margaret Long Wisdom High School (formerly Robert E. Lee High School), with Lamar High School and Westside High Schools as options.) serves a small portion of western Sharpstown.

Sharpstown International School, a 6–12 district magnet school, is in the community. Las Américas Newcomer School, a 6–8 school for new immigrants, is on the property of Jane Long.

KIPP Houston Public Schools operates several charter schools along KIPP Way, west of Sharpstown.

- KIPP SHINE Preparatory School (Elementary school)
- KIPP Academy Middle School
- Kipp Sharpstown College Preparatory School (Middle school)
- KIPP Houston High School
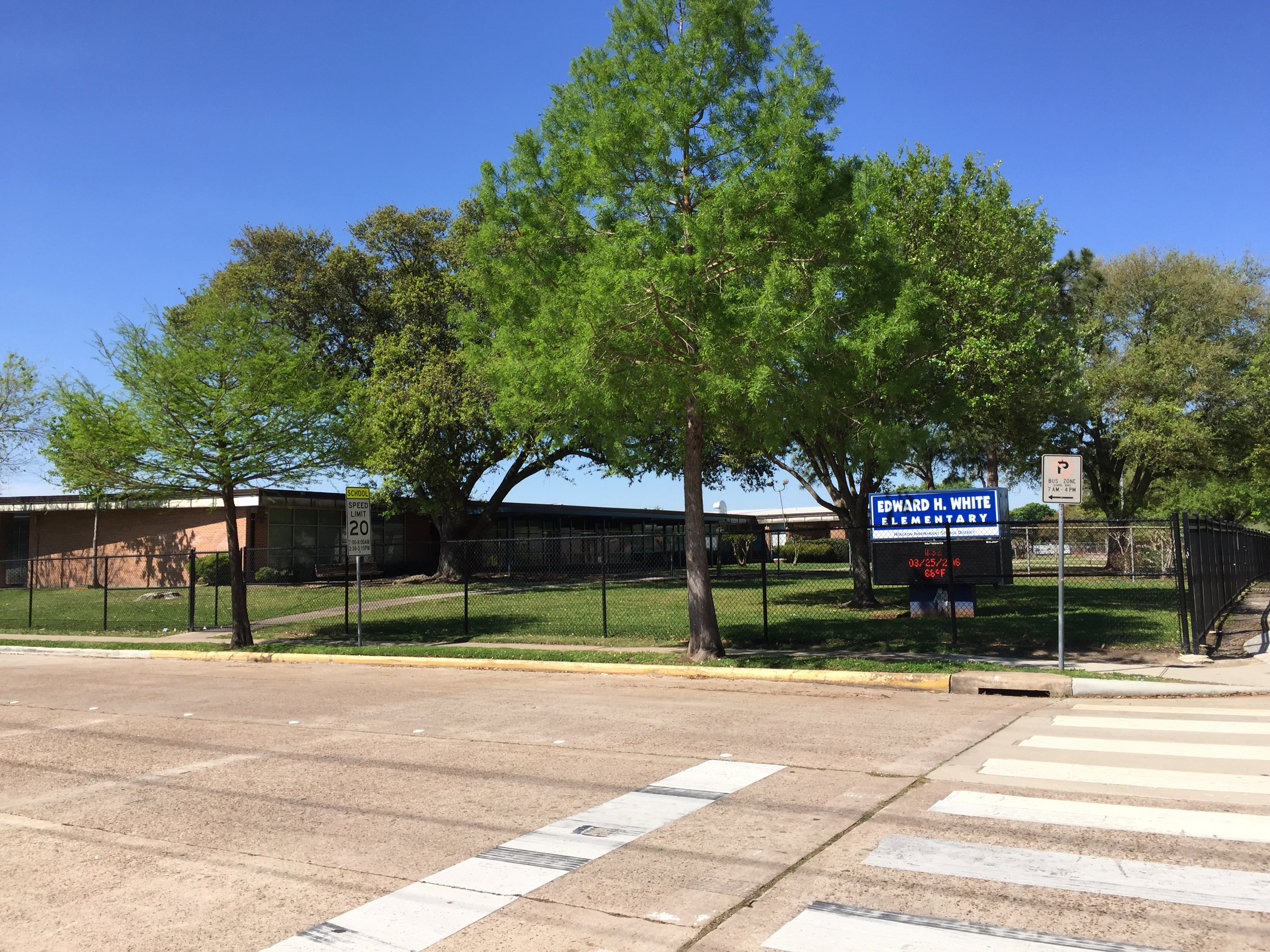
Edward H. White Elementary School

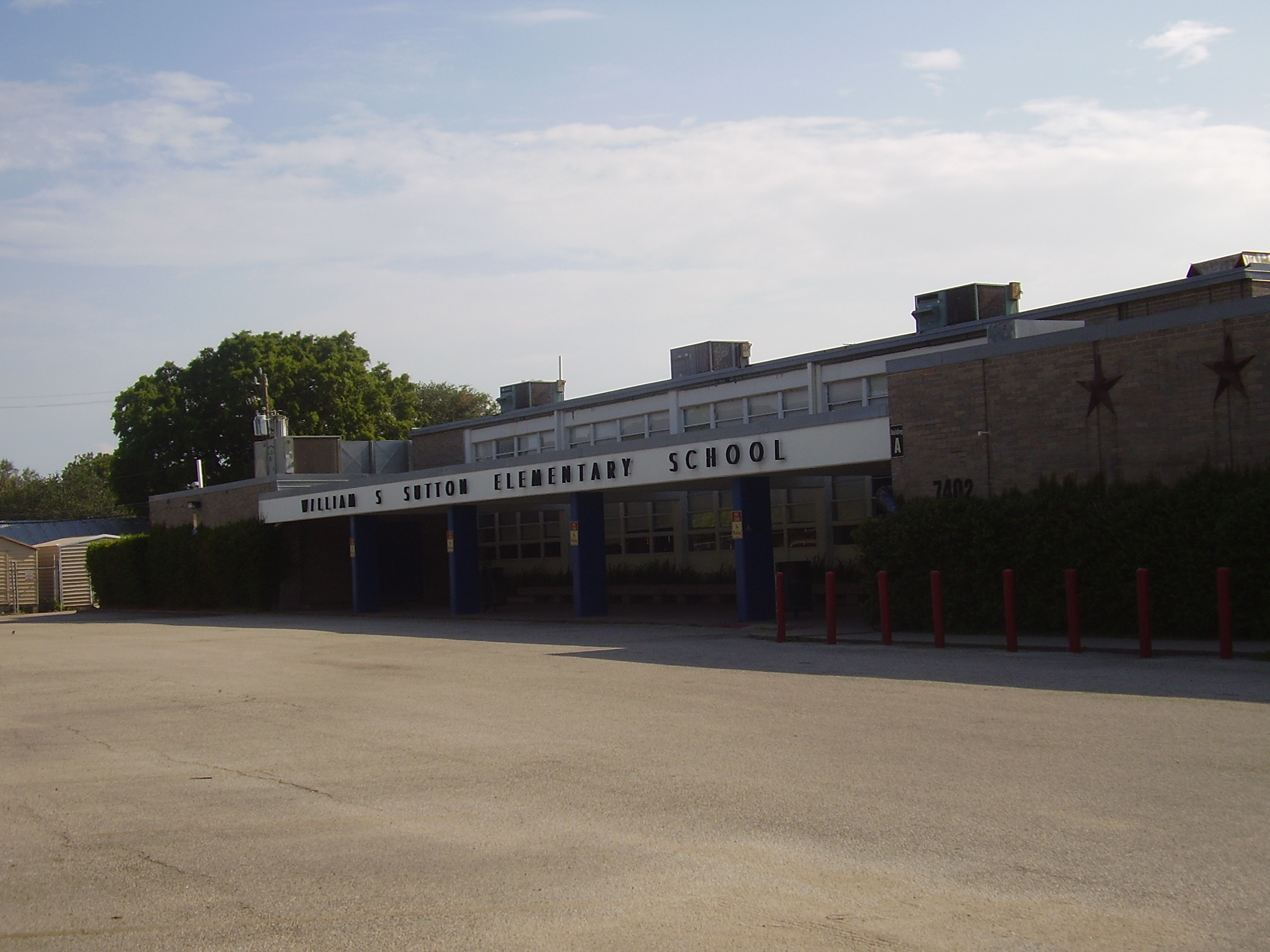
William S. Sutton Elementary School

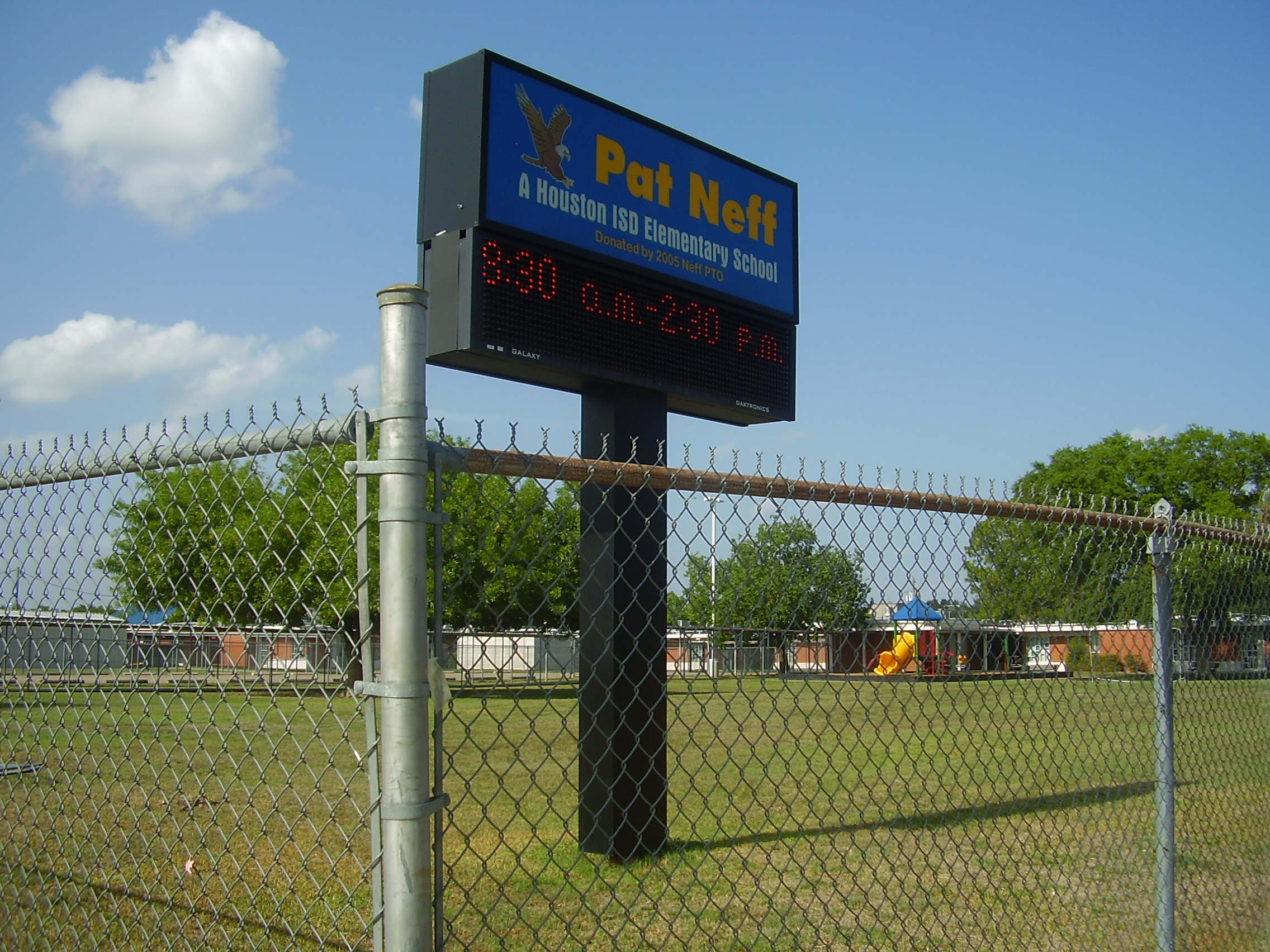
Pat Neff Elementary School (old campus)

===== Histories of public schools =====
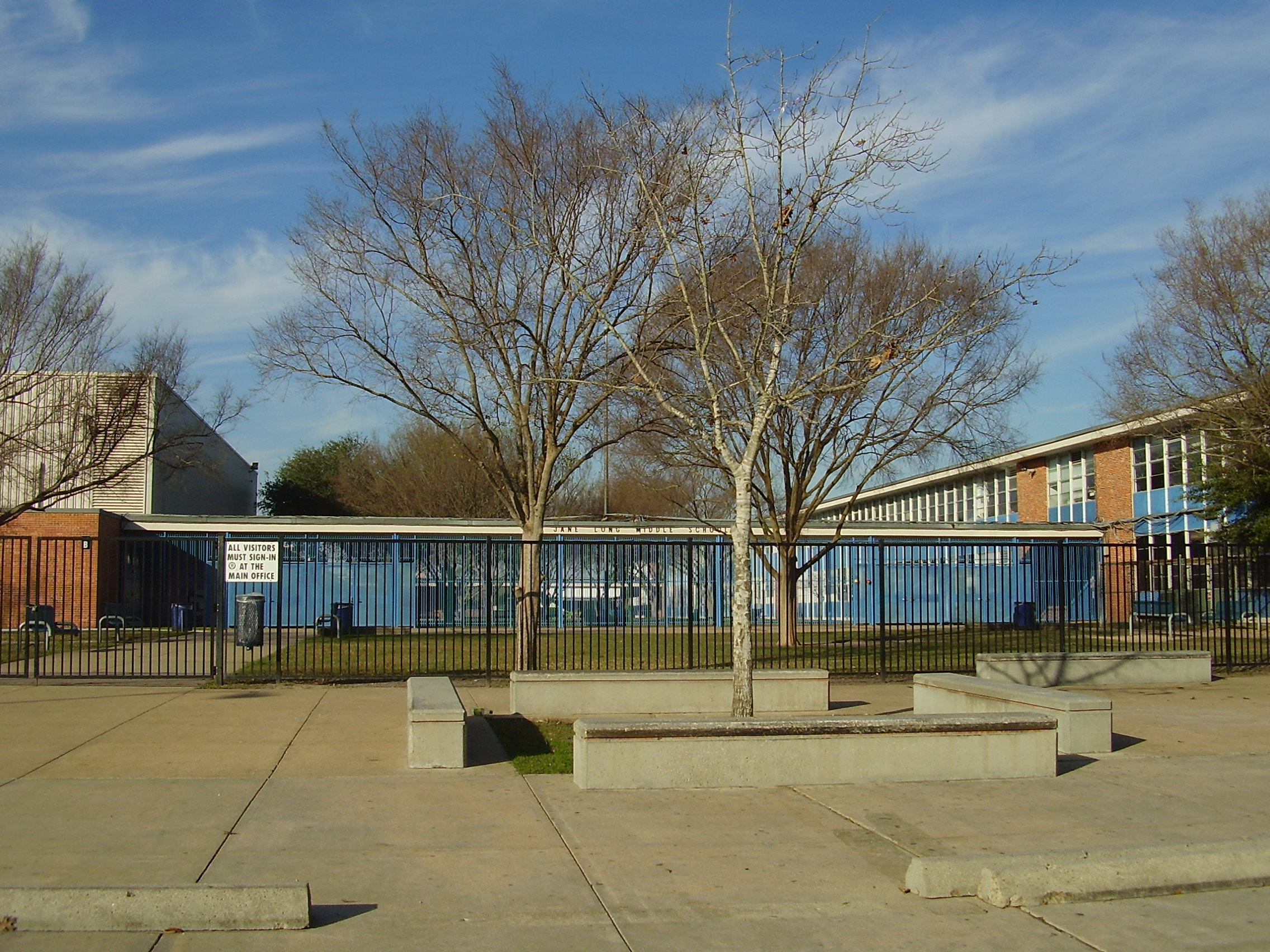
Jane Long Academy

Long Middle School was built in 1957. Sutton was built in 1958, and McNamara opened in 1958. Bonham was built 1962. Emerson was erected in 1963. Neff opened in 1964. White opened in 1967. Sharpstown Junior-Senior High School opened in 1968; the high school split and moved to its own campus in 1969. In February 1995 Sugar Grove, built in former church property, opened as a relief school. Sands Point opened in 1998 as a relief school for Emerson, Piney Point, and Walnut Bend. Repairs and renovations of Sugar Grove were completed by January 1999. In the early 2000s (decade), the areas north of Sands Point Drive were zoned to Sharpstown Middle School; at a later point they were rezoned to Revere. Sharpview Elementary School was temporarily established at 7734 Mary Bates in order to relieve some Sharpstown-area elementary schools; Sharpview opened fall 2000 and closed in spring 2004. Sugar Grove received a grades 5–6 attendance boundary in 2009.

In 2011 Sharpstown Middle was consolidated with Sharpstown International High School to form a new 6–12 school, Sharpstown International School. The new 6–12 school took attendance boundaries from Lee High School (now Wisdom High School) and Sharpstown High School, while Sugar Grove Middle School took portions of the boundary from Sharpstown Middle School. As of 2012, Sharpstown International School now has no boundary, with Sugar Grove Middle School and Sharpstown High School controlling its former middle and high school boundaries.

Liberty High School, an alternative high school for recent immigrants, was from 2017 on the campus of Sharpstown International. In 2022 it moved to the Houston Community College (HCC) Gulfton Campus.

==== Private schools ====
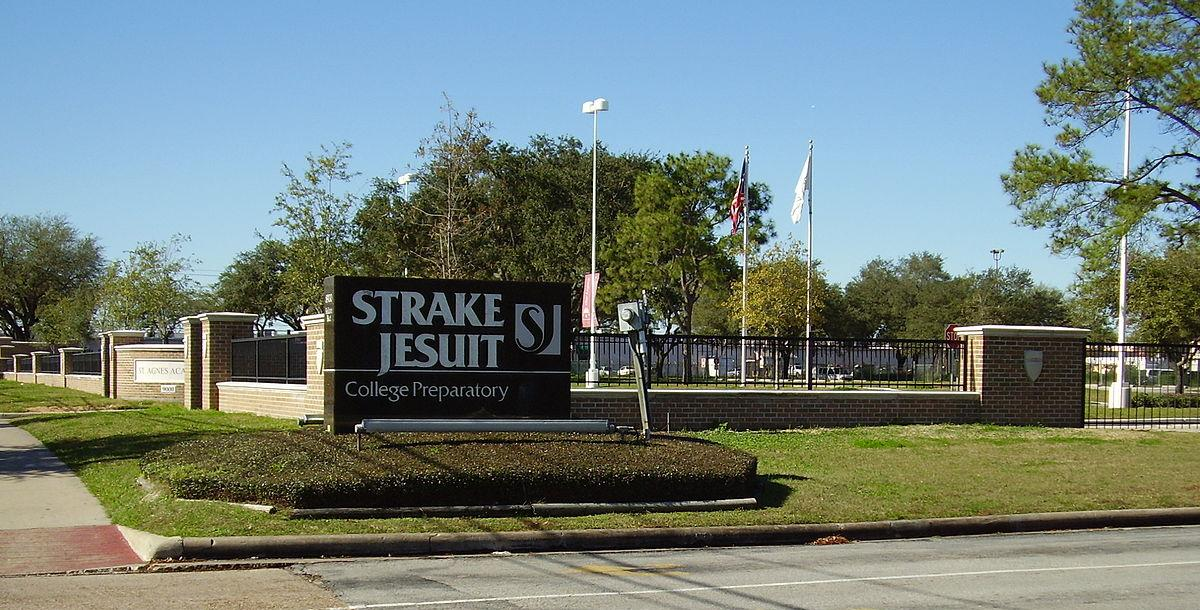
Strake Jesuit College Preparatory

Sharpstown also has three private schools. St. Francis de Sales Catholic School (grades K-8) is in Sharpstown Country Club Terrace Section 2. Secondary schools include Strake Jesuit College Preparatory and Saint Agnes Academy.

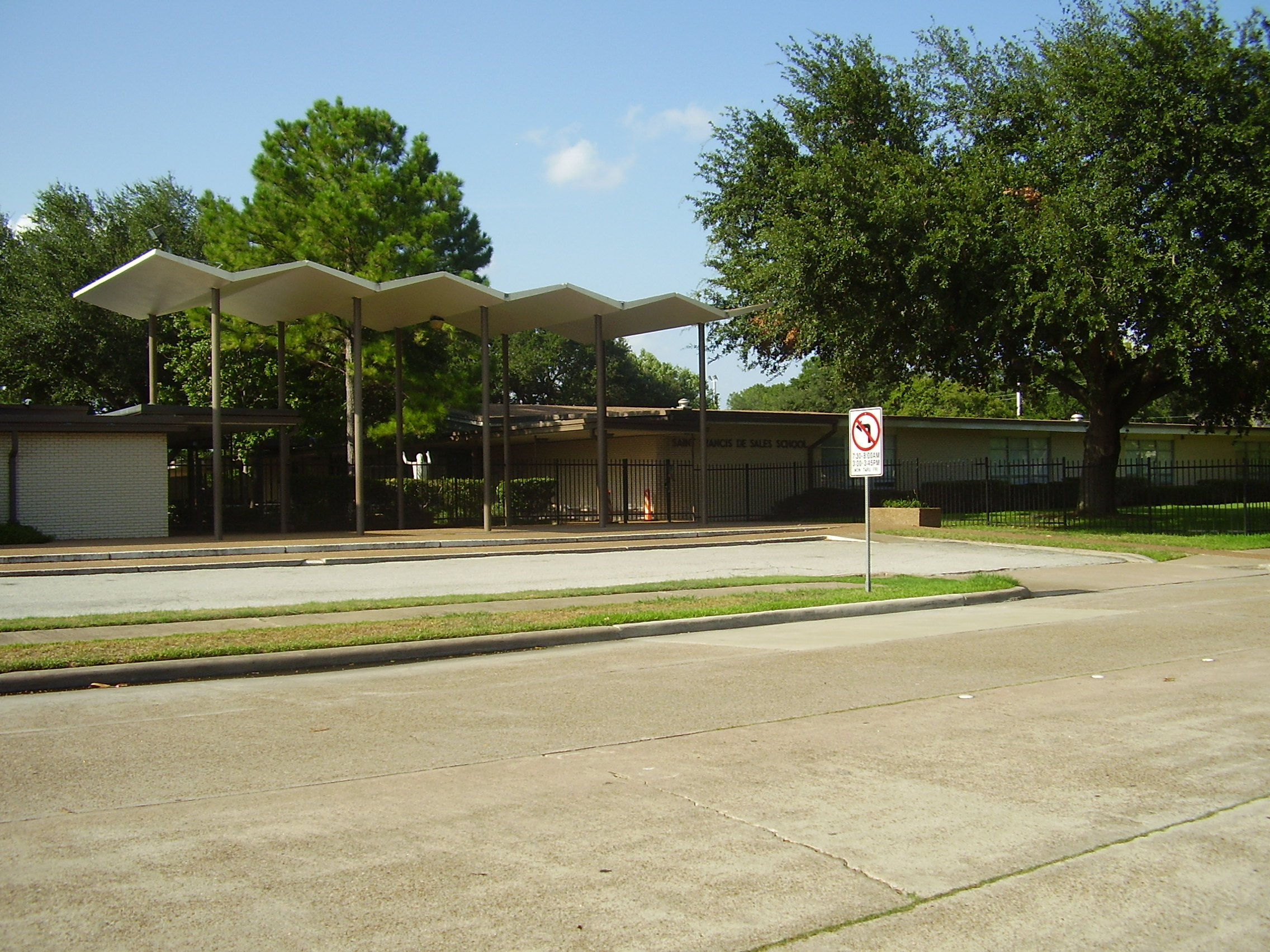
St. Francis de Sales School

=== Public libraries ===
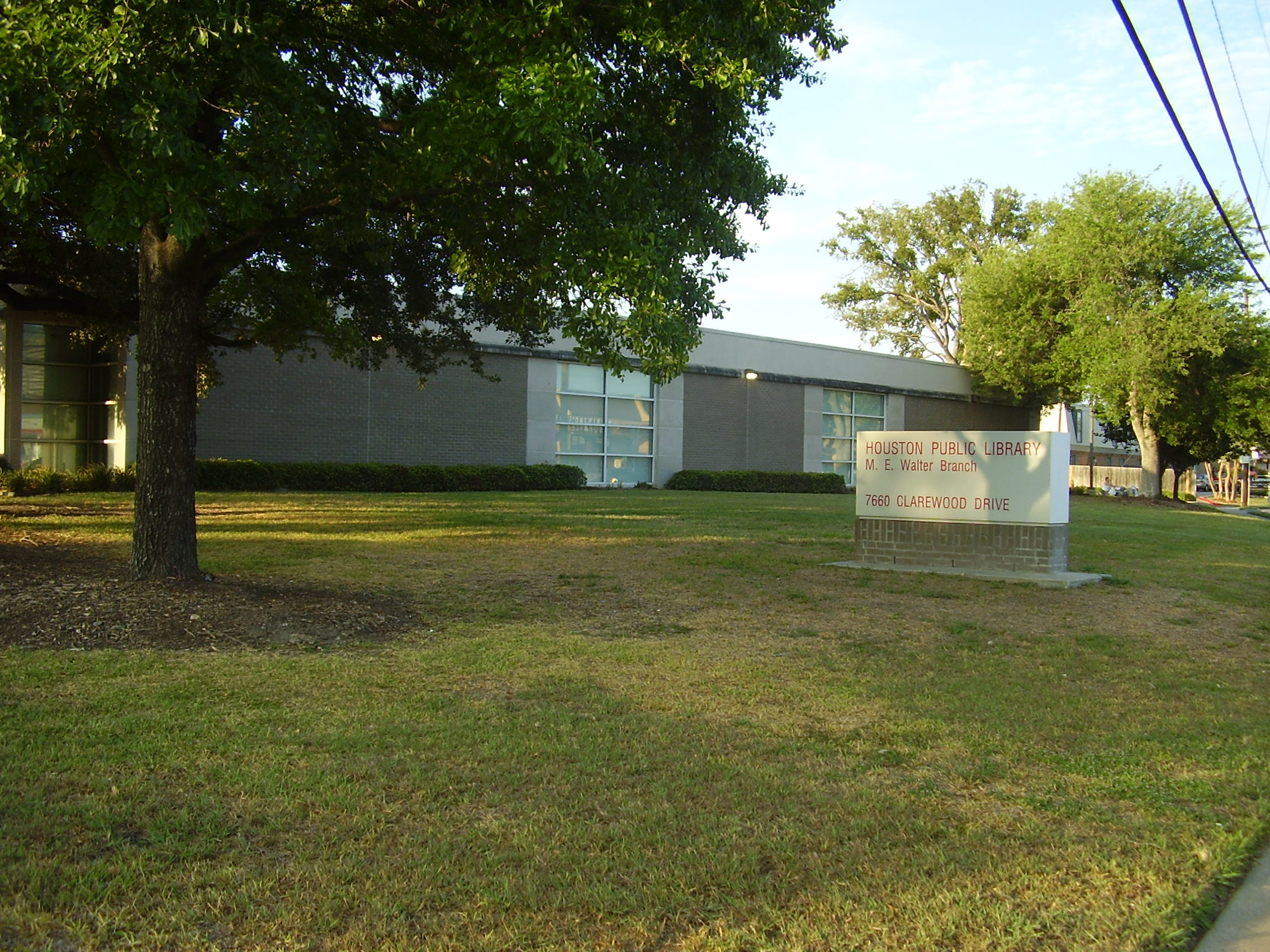
M. E. Walter Neighborhood Library

The area is served by the Houston Public Library. M. E. Walter Neighborhood Library, a full service branch, is located at 7660 Clarewood, in Sharpstown Section 4.

HPL Express Southwest is located within the Southwest Multi-Service Center at 6400 High Star in the Southwest Management District, east of the Sharpstown subdivisions.

== Community services ==
The Harris County Hospital District operates the Vallbona Health Center (formerly the People's Health Center) at 6630 DeMoss Street.

Memorial Hermann Hospital Southwest is in Sharpstown Section 3.

== Media ==
The Bellaire Texan, which served the Sharpstown community in the mid-20th Century, was headquartered in Bellaire and published by the Texan Publishing Corporation. By 1975 it became known as the Bellaire & Southwestern Texan and was published by the Preston Publishing Company. It was then headquartered in Houston.
