= Memorial Hermann Southwest Hospital =

Houston hospital

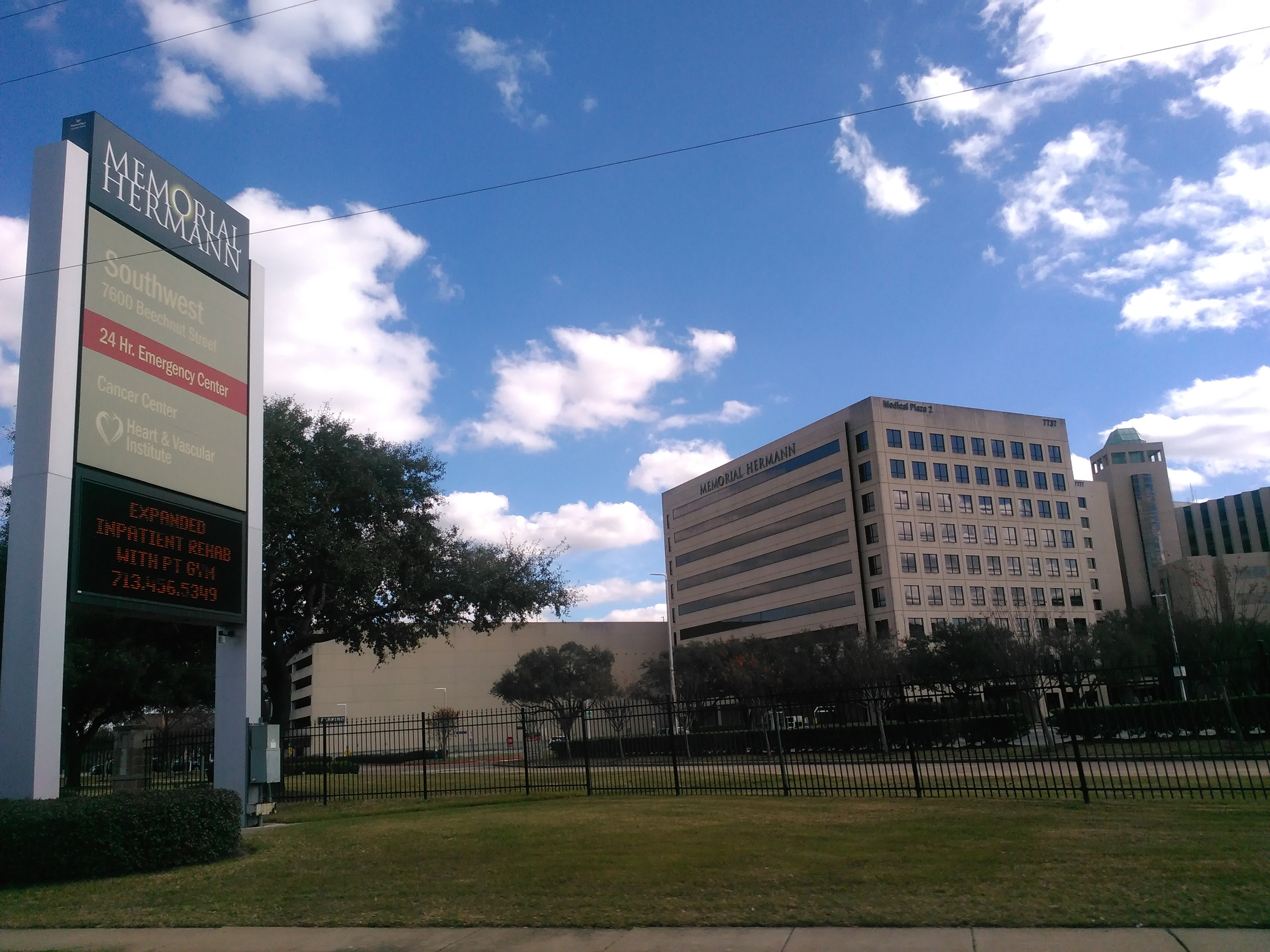

Geography
- Location: Sharpstown, Houston, Texas, United States
- Coordinates: 29.6933°N 95.5222°W

Organization
- Care system: Nonprofit
- Type: General

Services
- Emergency department: Level IV trauma center

Helipads
- Helipad: FAA LID: TS98

History
- Opened: 1977

Links
- Website: www.memorialhermann.org/locations/memorial-hermann-southwest-hospital/
- Lists: Hospitals in Texas

Memorial Hermann Southwest Hospital, formerly Southwest Memorial Hospital, is a hospital in Sharpstown Section 3, in Southwest Management District (formerly Greater Sharpstown), Houston. It is a part of the Memorial Hermann Healthcare System. The communities it serves include Bellaire, Missouri City, Uptown Houston (the Galleria area), and Southwest Houston, including Meyerland and Sharpstown.

Pediatric care to the hospital is provided by doctors from Children's Memorial Hermann Hospital which treats infants, children, teens, and young adults age 0-21.

== History ==
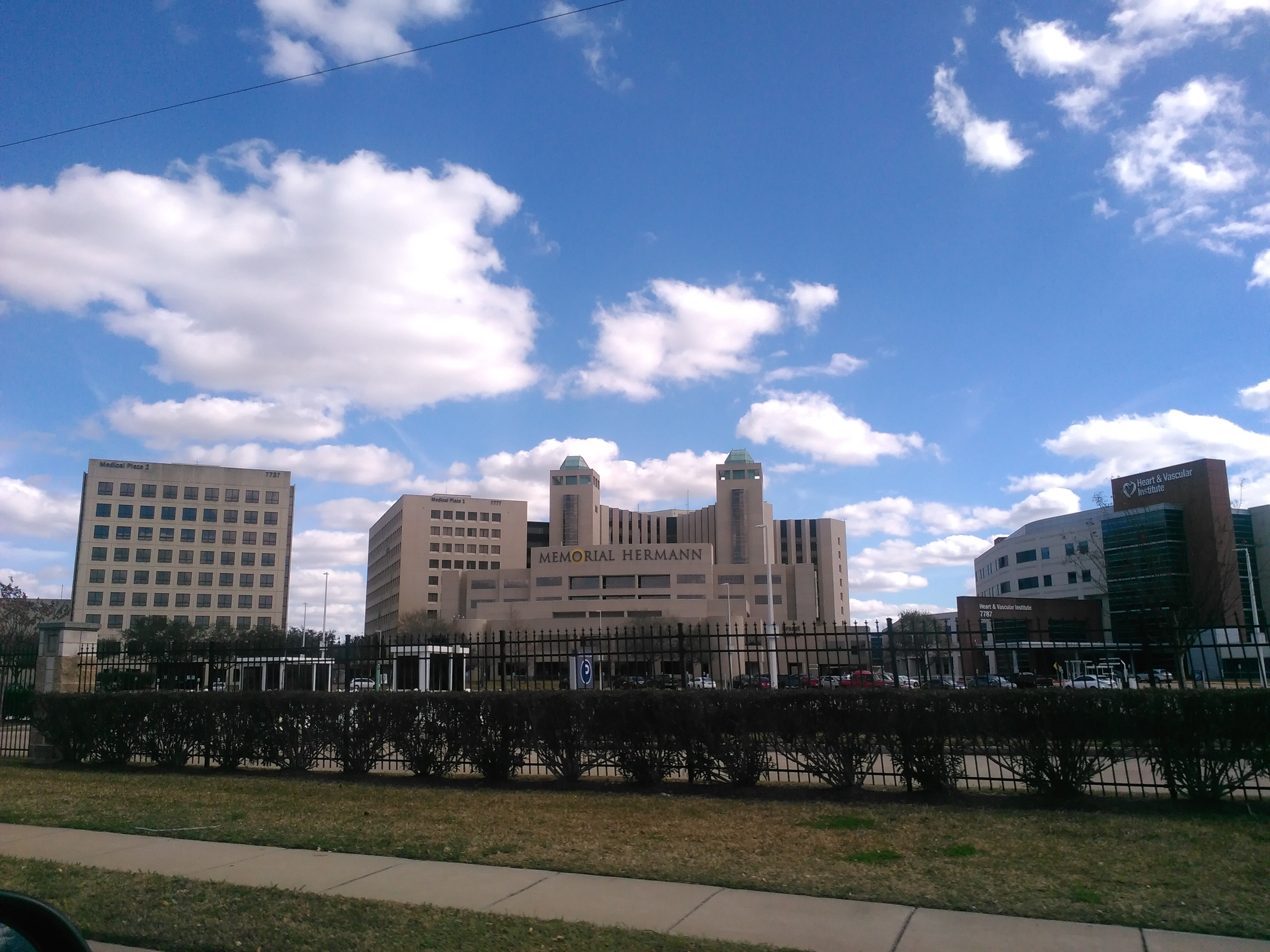
Memorial Hermann Southwest Hospital

It was established in 1977.

In August 2009 the Memorial Hermann Hospital System announced that it planned to sell its Southwest Hospital to the Harris County Hospital District (HCHD), which had plans to make the hospital its third general hospital. David Lopez, the president and CEO of the hospital district, stated that the price was somewhere around $165 million to $185 million. The majority of the medical staff of the Southwest Hospital expressed strong dissatisfaction with the proposal and stated intentions to resign if the sale proceeded. The medical staff leadership and around 200 other doctors signed a petition, unanimously approved at a medical staff meeting on Tuesday August 18, 2009, stating an intent to leave in case of a sale. Residential and community groups in the area around the hospital and Steve Radack, the Harris County commissioner, also opposed the plan.

Dan Wolterman, the Memorial Hermann president, asked the HCHD board to provide written responses to several actions by Friday September 18, 2009. Instead, on the day of the deadline, the county withdrew its bid to buy the hospital.

In 2016 Memorial Hermann took steps to upgrade Memorial Hermann Southwest's trauma level to Level II. In 2017 Memorial Hermann downgraded the trauma level to Level IV.

== Facility ==
The complex is located at the intersection of Interstate 69/U.S. Route 59 (Southwest Freeway) and Beechnut. The hospital has space for 594 patients. The complex includes a hospital building and centers for cancer, outpatient imaging, surgery, and vascular services. It also houses four office buildings.

== Staff demographics ==
As of August 2009 a spokesperson of the Memorial Hermann Healthcare System stated that the hospital had 425 active medical staff members. That year, Todd Ackerman of the Houston Chronicle wrote that one doctor estimated that about 80% of the hospital's business is served by 80 to 100 doctors.
