= New Castle High School =

New Castle High School could refer to:

- New Castle High School (New Castle, Indiana) in New Castle, Indiana
- New Castle Junior/Senior High School in New Castle, Pennsylvania

== See also ==
- Newcastle High School (disambiguation)
