= North County High School =

North County High School may refer to:

- North County High School (Glen Burnie, Maryland),
- North County High School (Missouri), St. Francois County, Missouri
