= Sharpstown International School =

Location
- 8330 Triola Lane; Houston, TX 77036; United States; 29°41′54″N 95°31′54″W

Information
- Type: Public school, magnet: International Studies
- Established: 2011
- Locale: urban
- School district: Houston Independent School District
- Principal: Adriana Lopez-Garcia
- Staff: 60.44 (FTE)
- Grades: 6-12
- Enrollment: 1,119 (2017-18)
- Average class size: 22
- Student to teacher ratio: 18.51
- Hours in school day: 8:30 AM to 4:00PM
- Colors: Red Navy blue and Black
- Mascot: Spartan
- Website: https://sis.houstonisd.org/

Sharpstown International School is a middle and high school in Houston, Texas, located in Section 2 of Sharpstown Country Club Estates. The school serves grades 6 through 12 and is part of the Houston Independent School District. As of 2023 it is an all-magnet school.

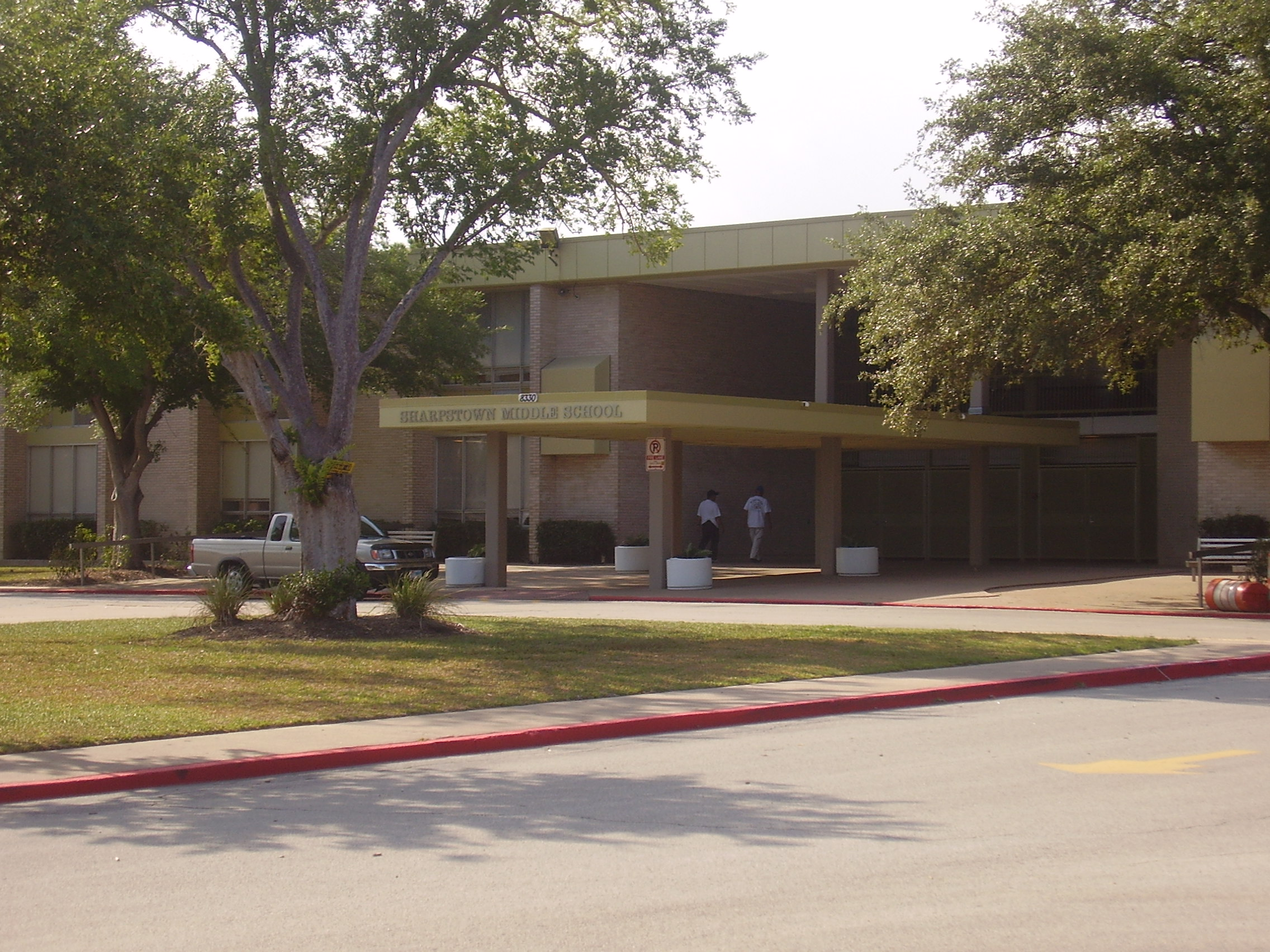
Sharpstown International School

The Houston I.S.D. in partnership with Asia Society International Studies Schools Network developed a new, small high school in August 2007 called the International High School at Sharpstown. In the 2011-2012 school year, International High School and Sharpstown Middle School were consolidated to be Sharpstown International School, the first sixth-through-twelfth grade magnet program in HISD. The school's international studies magnet program offers Model United Nations, Chinese and Spanish languages, study abroad opportunities, and an internationalized curriculum.

The student body represents more than 45 countries and over 35 languages. The majority of students speak Spanish, Chinese, Vietnamese, Igbo, Amharic, and Tigrinya.

The school's mascot for its sports teams is the "Spartan." Previously, Sharpstown Middle School's sports teams were called the Vikings.

Sharpstown International School offers an annual International Festival. The International Festival happens every first Tuesday of December.

== History ==
The building that now houses Sharpstown International School was originally built in 1967 as a high school. It was named Sharpstown Junior/Senior High School, housing grades 7–12. The area around the school grew quickly and, in 1969 a new Sharpstown Senior High campus (serving grades 10–12) was built on Bissonnet Street. The older campus became Sharpstown Junior High, serving grades 7–9. At the beginning of the 1981-1982 school year, Sharpstown Junior High became Sharpstown Middle School (grades 6–8), and Sharpstown Senior High became Sharpstown High School.

In 2011 Sharpstown Middle was consolidated with the International High School at Sharpstown to form a new 6-12 school, Sharpstown International School. For a short time, the school did have an attendance boundary for grades 6-12. By 2012 its section was reassigned to Sugar Grove Middle School (6-8) and Sharpstown High School (9-12). Sharpstown International School now has no zone/boundary because of its magnet program.

Liberty High School, an alternative high school for recent immigrants, was from 2017 on the campus of Sharpstown International. In 2022 it moved to the Houston Community College (HCC) Gulfton Campus.

== Location ==
Sharpstown International School is in the Sharpstown area of Houston.

=== Transportation ===
Houston ISD provides school buses for magnet students and to those who live more than two miles from the school.

== Student body ==
Students represent more than 45 countries of origin and approximately 35 languages are spoken.

== School uniforms ==
Sharpstown International School has a mandatory school uniform policy. The middle schoolers have to wear red and the high schoolers have to wear navy blue. Only the seniors get to wear black.
