= North Central High School =

North Central High School may refer to one of many high school in the United States:

- North Central High School (Farmersburg, Indiana)
- North Central High School (Indianapolis)
- North Central High School (Louisiana), Lebeau, Louisiana
- North Central High School (Rocklake, North Dakota), Rocklake, North Dakota
- North Central High School (Rogers, North Dakota), Rogers, North Dakota
- North Central High School (Pioneer, Ohio)
- North Central High School (Kershaw, South Carolina)
- North Central High School (Spokane, Washington)
