= Liberty High School (Houston) =

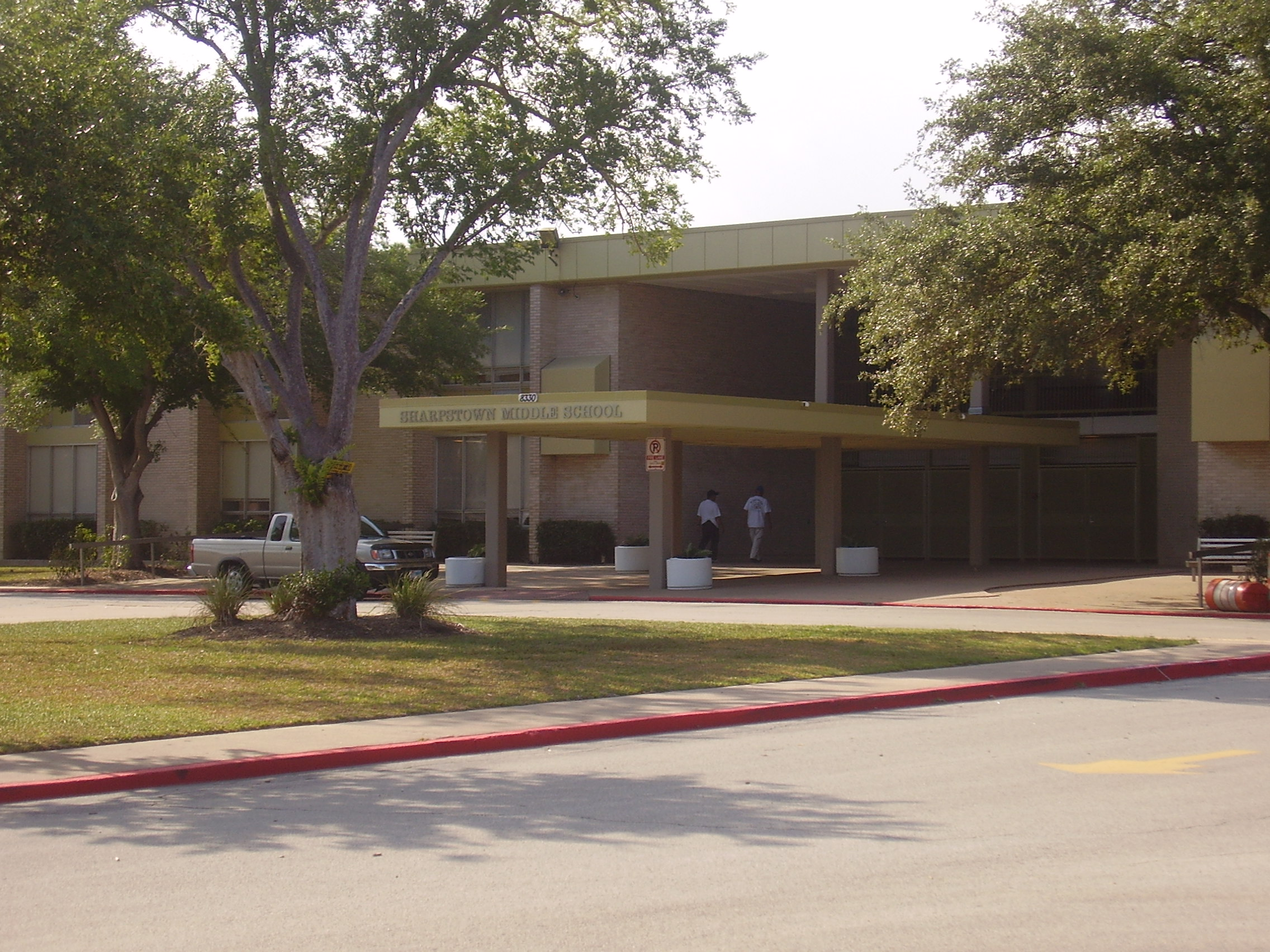
- Former location, Sharpstown International School

Location
- HCC Gulfton Campus; 5407 Gulfton St. Houston, Texas 77081; United States; 29.716214900401877°N 95.47462641703993°W

Information
- Type: Public high school
- Faculty: 20.79 (FTE)
- Grades: 12
- Enrollment: 391 (2017-18)
- Student to teacher ratio: 18.81
- Website: Official Website

Liberty High School is an alternative high school on the grounds of the Houston Community College Gulfton Campus in Gulfton, Houston, Texas. A part of the Houston Independent School District, it is a school catering to recent immigrants.

Liberty has intensive English instruction, which serves as the school's main focus. It also has flexible scheduling and year-round scheduling. This scenario caters to older students who are recent immigrants. The school's intention is to ensure that students receive high school diplomas.

As of 2015 the principal is Mónico Rivas, who has been principal since the school's founding in 2005.

== History ==
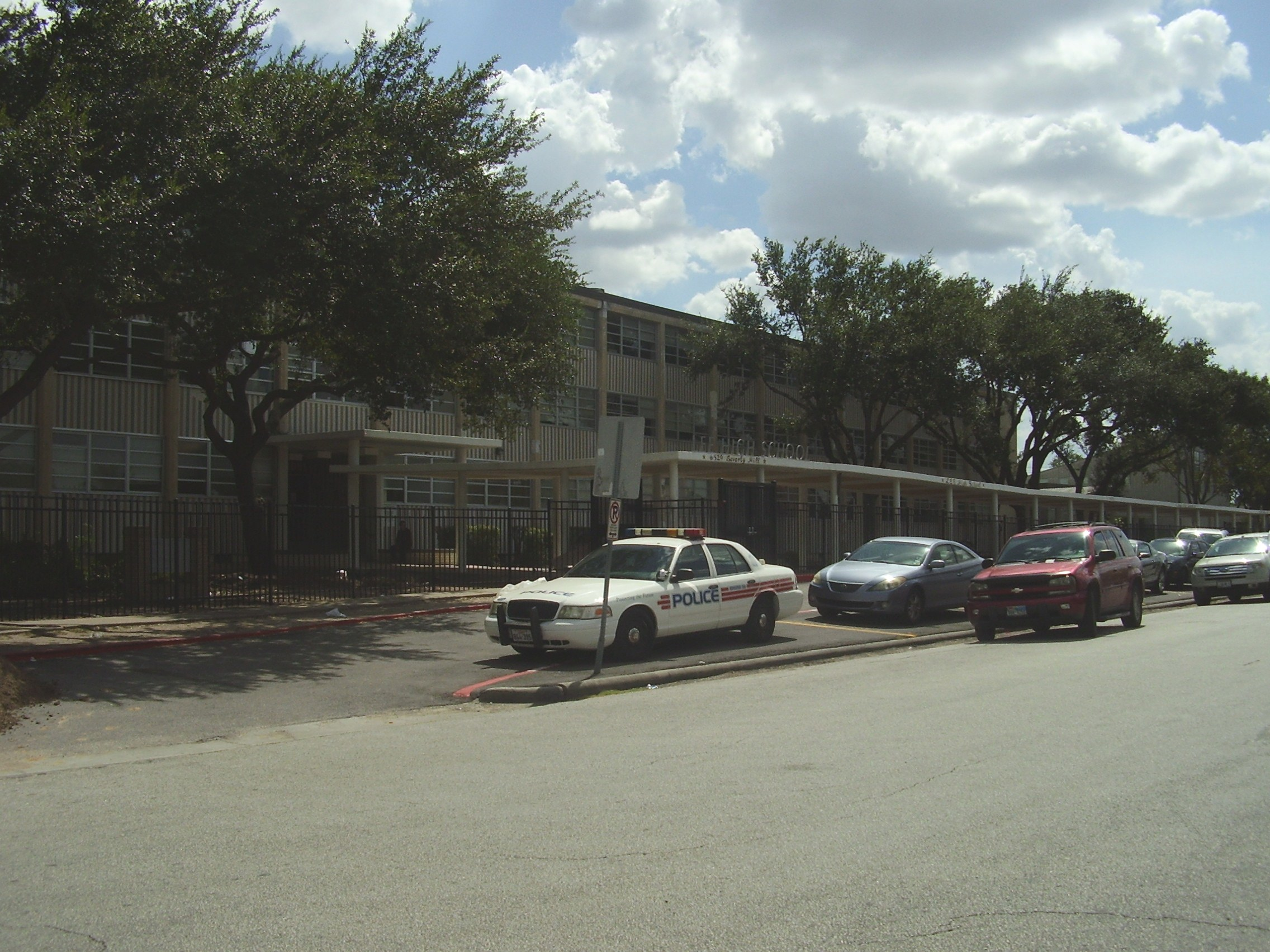
Liberty was a project started by officials at Lee High School (now known as Wisdom High School), and originally it was located on the Lee campus

The Lee High School (now known as Wisdom High School) principal, faculty, and community expressed interest in having a special charter school for recent immigrants opened. In the 2003-2004 school year, of the 2,100 students attending Lee, 205 were recent immigrants who were 17 or older and entering the 9th grade for the first time, making them "overage" in the U.S. educational system. The students had received different types of formal education in their countries of origin. The HISD board approved the formation of the school on September 9, 2004. Steve Amstutz, the Lee principal, was the main figure responsible for the school's creation.

The school, originally on the Lee High School campus, opened on January 10, 2005, with 125 students attending the opening night; the projected enrollment was 75. The school was originally named Newcomer Charter High School (NCHS). School officials placed fliers promoting NCHS in Gulfton-area apartment complexes, churches, flea markets, and washaterias. In 2006 the school was scheduled to move out of the Lee campus and into its standalone campus. In 2007 community leaders, students, and teachers recommended that the school adopt its current name. In June 2007 the school had 195 students.

The school relocated to a new location and adopted its current name in June 2007. It was now in a shopping center along U.S. Route 59 (Southwest Freeway).

In 2007 the school had low Texas Assessment of Knowledge and Skills (TAKS) passing rates. It encouraged all of its students to take the test. In 2008 its immigrant students came from Latin America, Asia, and Africa. Many students recruited relatives and school-aged coworkers by word of mouth. During that year it had a $1.57 million operating budget. The budget amounted to $6,856 per student. Scarborough High School had a per student cost of $5,442, with 890 students attending the school.

By 2015 a day school program was established at Liberty High.

In 2016 the Tax day floods caused the campus to have minor issues.

Liberty High moved to the campus of Sharpstown International School in Sharpstown, due to the effect of Hurricane Harvey on the former campus in 2017. The move is temporary and HISD was to later determine the permanent location. Several Liberty students had their own residences flood during Harvey.

== Demographics ==
As of 2018 the school had about 400 students, with about 28 native languages represented and with virtually all having low English fluency. The student body, almost completely those of recent immigrants, was made up of a majority of those of Central American origin and with others from the continents of Africa and Asia, including those from the Middle East region. The majority lived in Gulfton and Sharpstown in southwest Houston with some from north Houston and southeast Houston.

As of September 2015 the school had about 450 students. All of the students were immigrants, and refugees made up about 10% of the student body.

In September 2007 the school had almost 200 students. 18 of those students were age 22 through 26. By 2007 Texas state law had changed, funding students up to age 25 (as of September 1 of the school year) to study for a traditional high school diploma; previously the state only paid for students up to age 21 (as of September 1 of the school year), and HISD paid for the education of some students older than 21.

In the 2006-2007 school year there were 229 students, with origins from Africa, Asia, and Latin America, and with 96% being classified as low income. Most of the students were between the ages of 17 and 21.

== Campus ==
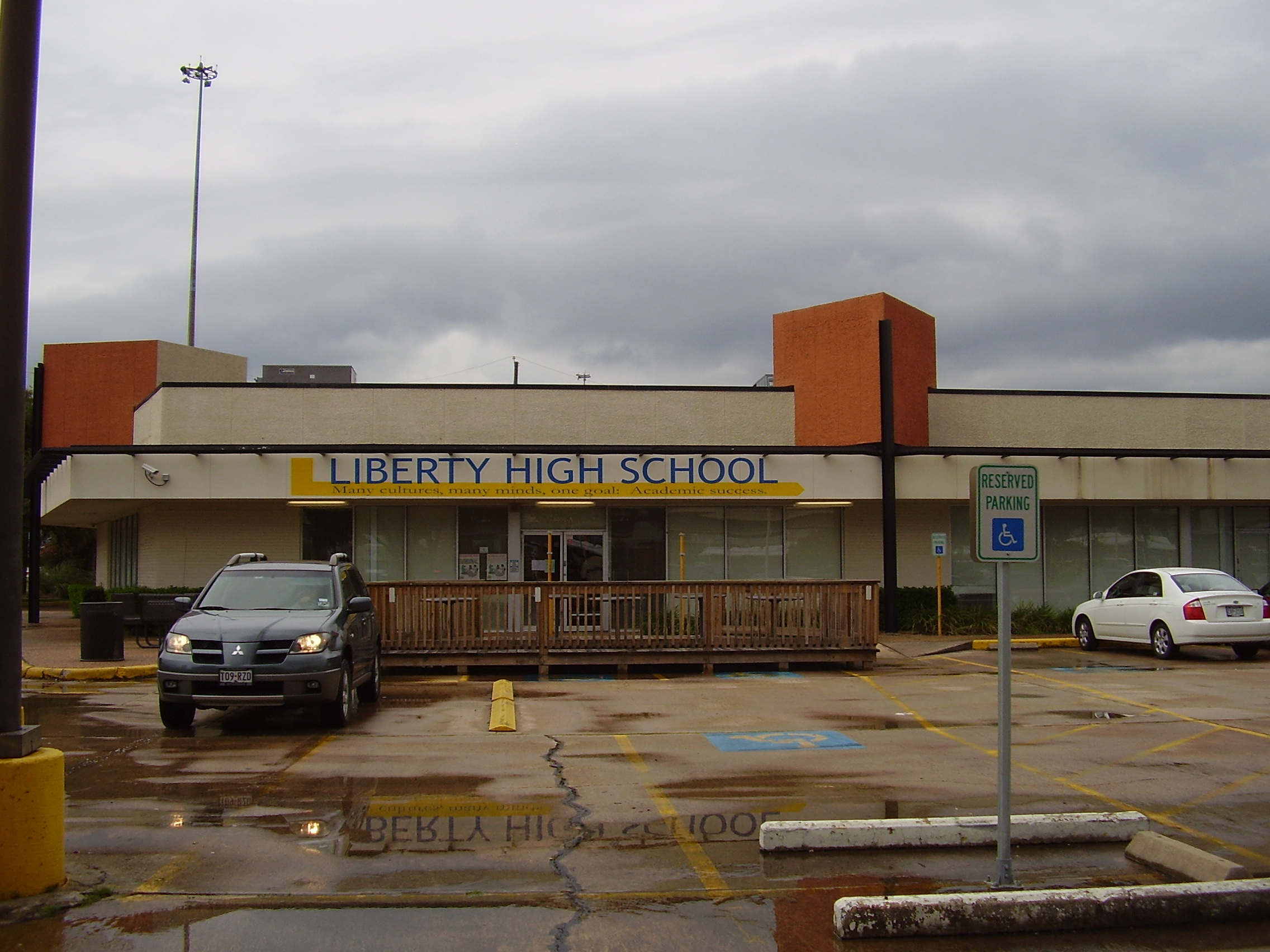
Former campus on U.S. Route 59 (Southwest Freeway)

Effective 2022 it occupies its current location, the Houston Community College (HCC) Gulfton Center Gulfton Campus.

It previously occupied space on the grounds of Sharpstown International School in Sharpstown.

Its previous campus was in Suite A of the 6400 SW Freeway shopping complex, off the Hillcroft Avenue exit of U.S. Route 59 (Southwest Freeway), in the vicinity of Gulfton and Sharpstown, and about midway between Beltway 8 and the 610 Loop. Its former U.S. 59 campus, a leased property, previously served as a restaurant; the restaurant's bar was re-purposed as a cafeteria serving line. Jacob Carpenter of the Houston Chronicle stated that the classrooms were "nondescript". The center of the lot had a group of trees and picnic tables, while a volleyball net was in its periphery. Andrew Kragie of the Houston Chronicle wrote "Other than a front-door sticker telling visitors to register with the front desk, the building's exterior gives little sign that a school operates here."

== School culture ==
The school has a debate team and participate in school sports activities. At the US 59 campus students used the school's parking lot for pickup soccer. When the school was established, officials believed that the students would be unable to participate in extracurricular programs due to being busy with out-of-school employment and care for family members, but they established extracurricular programs upon discovering student interest.
