= List of Houston Independent School District schools =

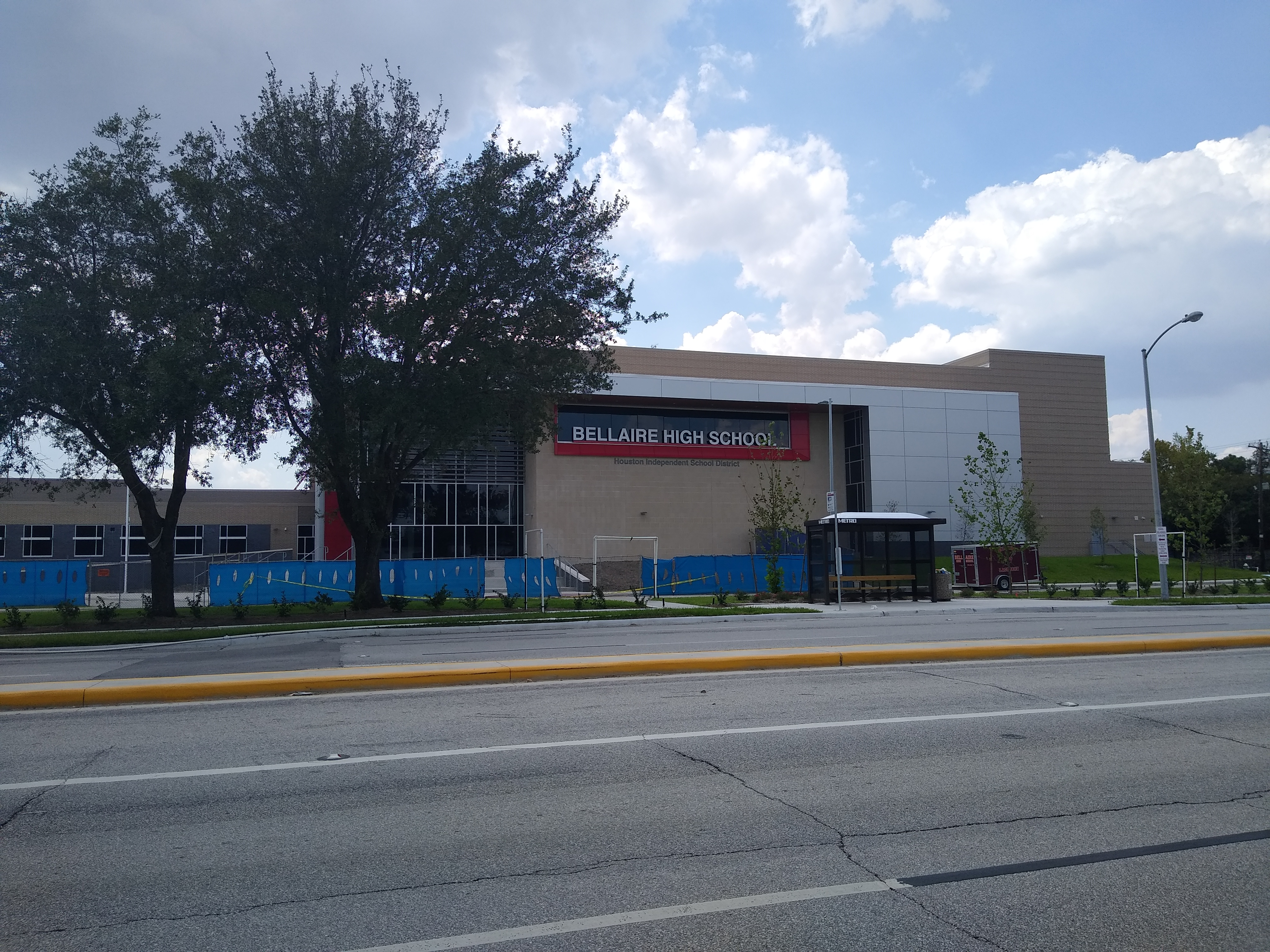
Bellaire High School

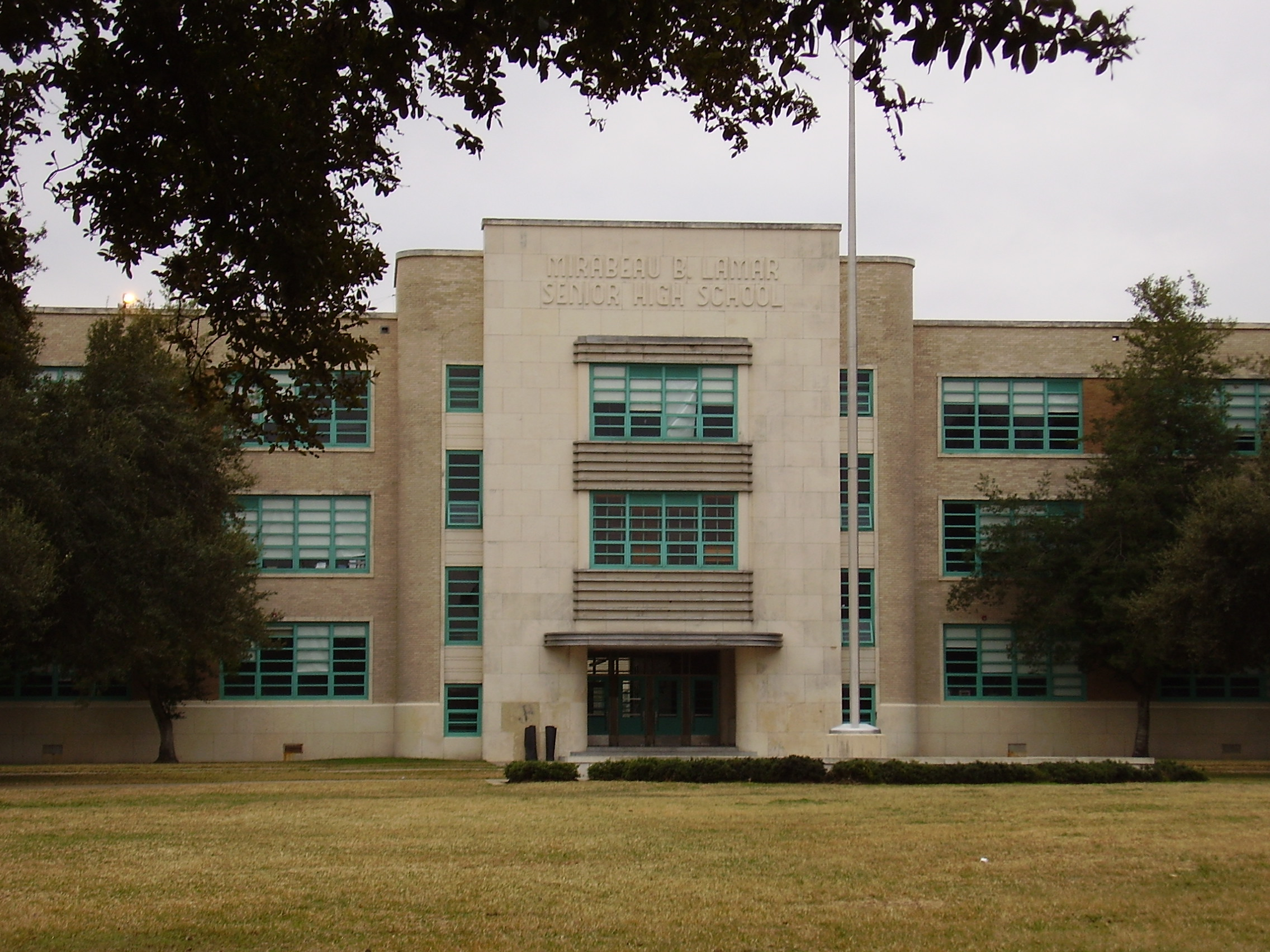
Lamar High School

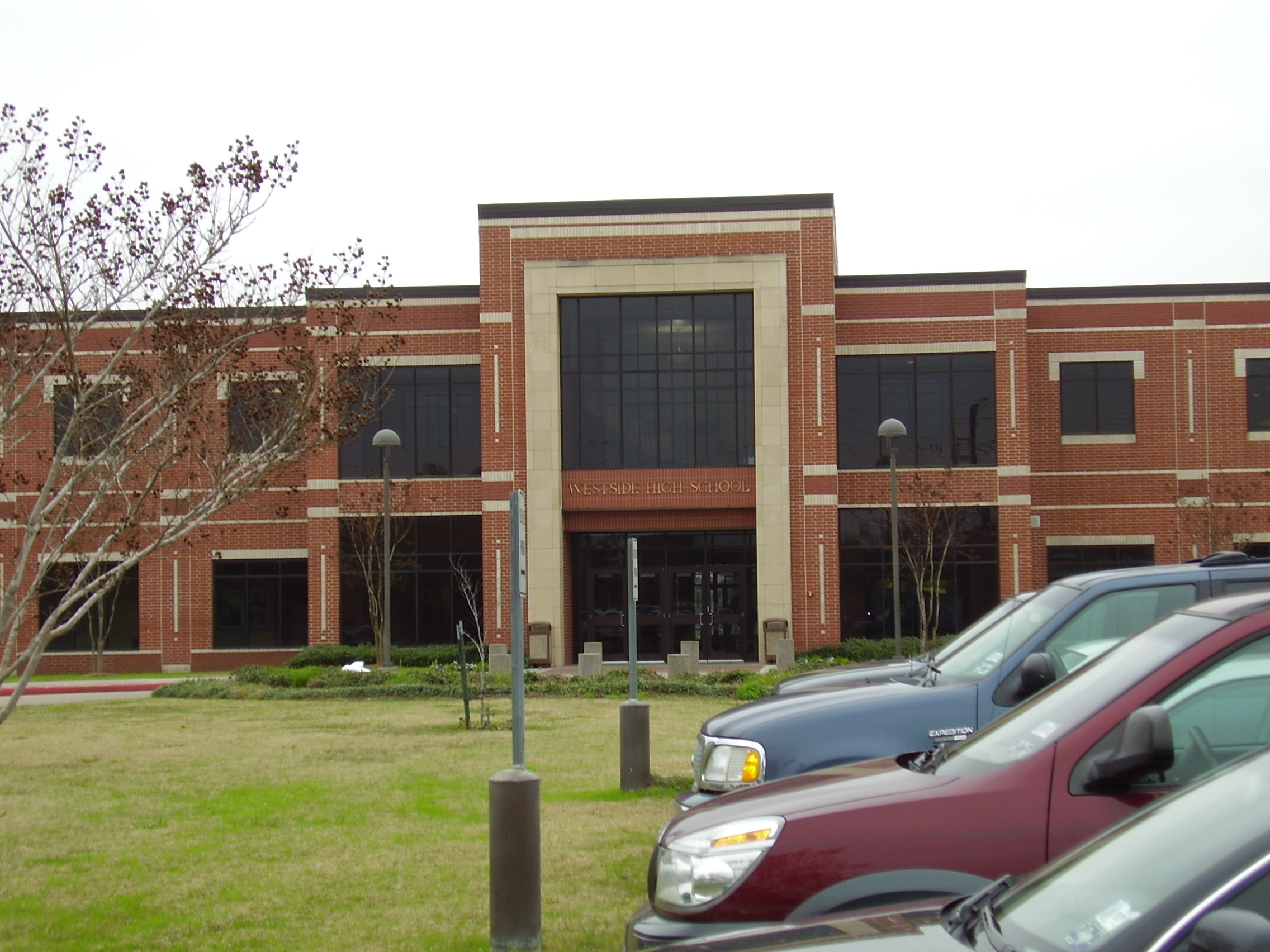
Westside High School

This is a list of schools operated by the Houston Independent School District.

In the district, grades kindergarten through 5 are considered to be elementary school, grades 6 through 8 are considered to be middle school, and grades 9 through 12 are considered to be senior high school. Some elementary schools go up to the sixth grade.

Every house in HISD is assigned to an elementary school, a middle school, and a high school. HISD has many alternative programs and transfer options available to students who want a specialized education and/or dislike their home schools.

== Current schools ==
=== EE-12 schools ===
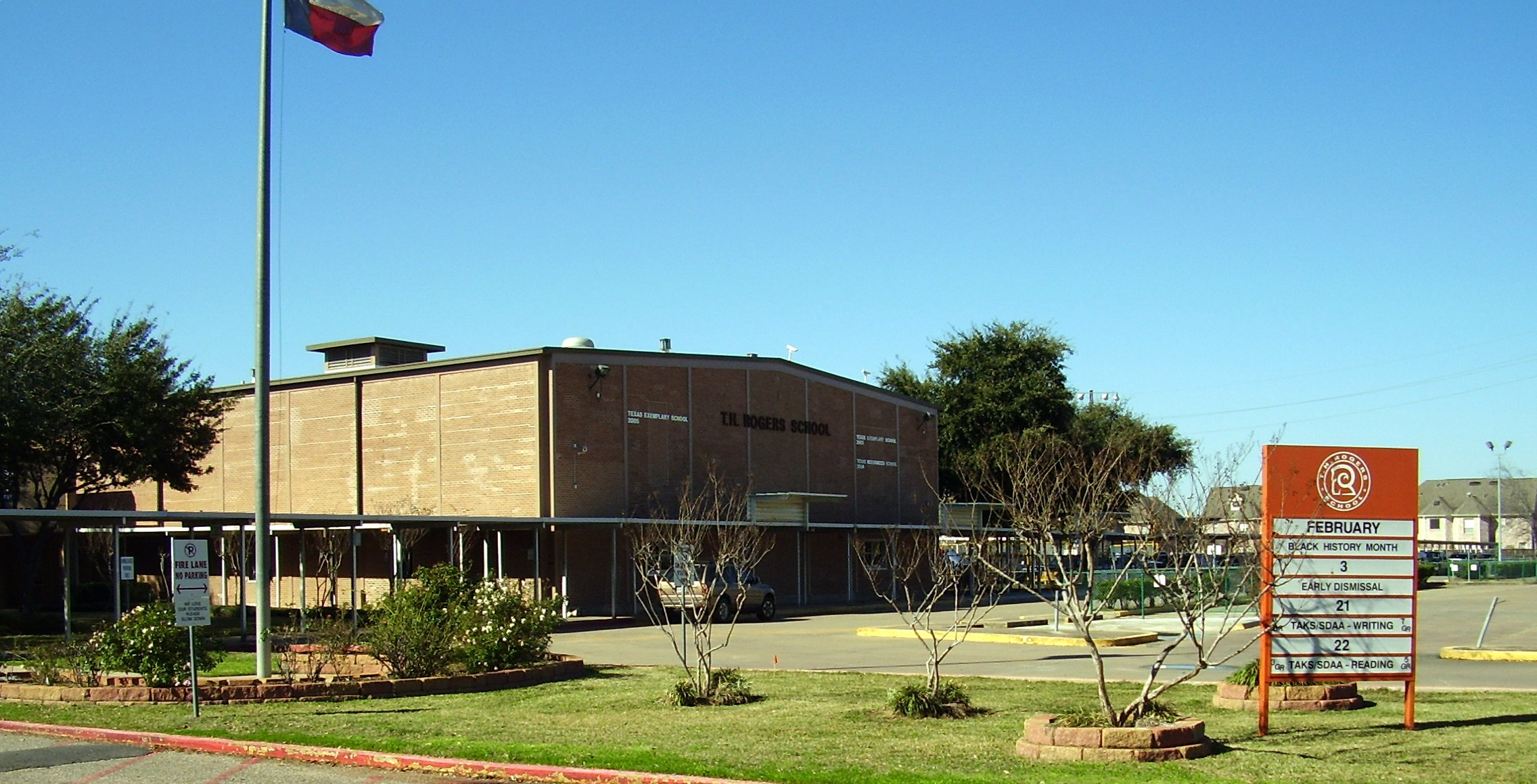
T. H. Rogers School

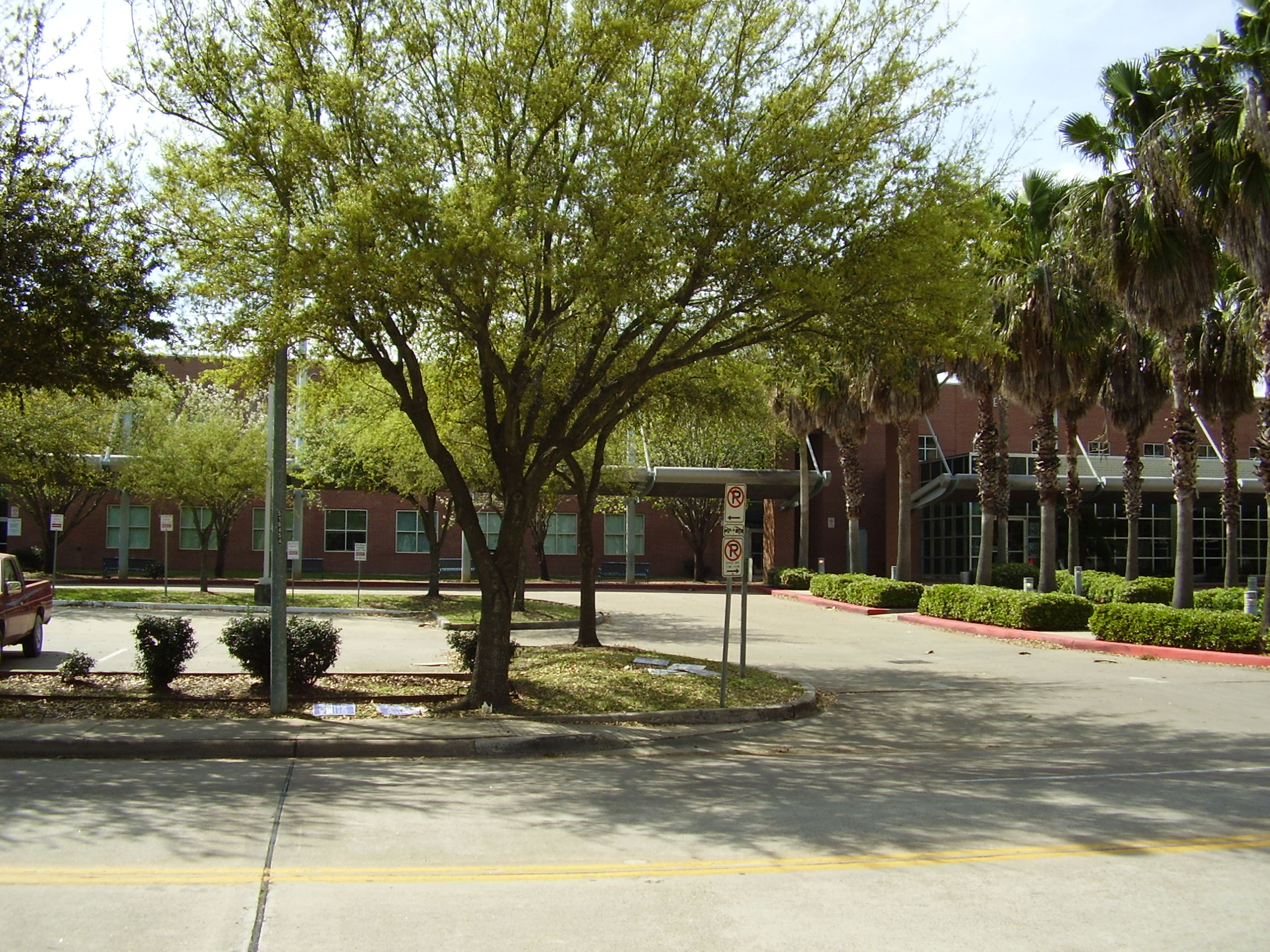
The Rice School

- Thomas Horace Rogers School (alternative school) is part Vanguard school (K-8), part school for the deaf (K-8), and part school for multiply impaired children (K-12).

=== EE-8 schools ===
Traditional:

- Gregory Lincoln Education Center (zoned school) (Houston)

Alternative:

- Briarmeadow Charter School (HISD charter school) (Houston)
  - Named after the Briarmeadow community, it was created in 1997, with 125 students, to relieve Piney Point and three other elementary schools. Briarmeadow Charter at one time rented space at the Post Oak YMCA, with students using an area library and the cafeteria of T.H. Rogers School.
  - It moved into a permanent 11-acre (4.5 ha) facility, with the school building being 90,000-square-foot (8,400 m^{2}) former manufacturing warehouse, with room for 550 pupils, in 2001; the building had a value of $10 million, funded by the Rebuild 2002 bond, and its second floor had 7,000 square feet (650 m^{2}) of space. The classrooms are in groups with a common area linking them. The building's facilities include a cafeteria equipped with a stage and designated for multiple purposes, a fine art studio with a separate entry area and an attached music studio with high-acoustic capabilities, two computer laboratories, a library, a multimedia room, a music studio, two language laboratories, and a science laboratory. Athletic fields, a nature area, and playgrounds use an outdoor area with 11 acres (4.5 ha) of space. HISD had plans to use the second floor as administrative offices. It had 220 students in June 2001, increasing to 350 by September of that year.

=== PK-8 schools ===
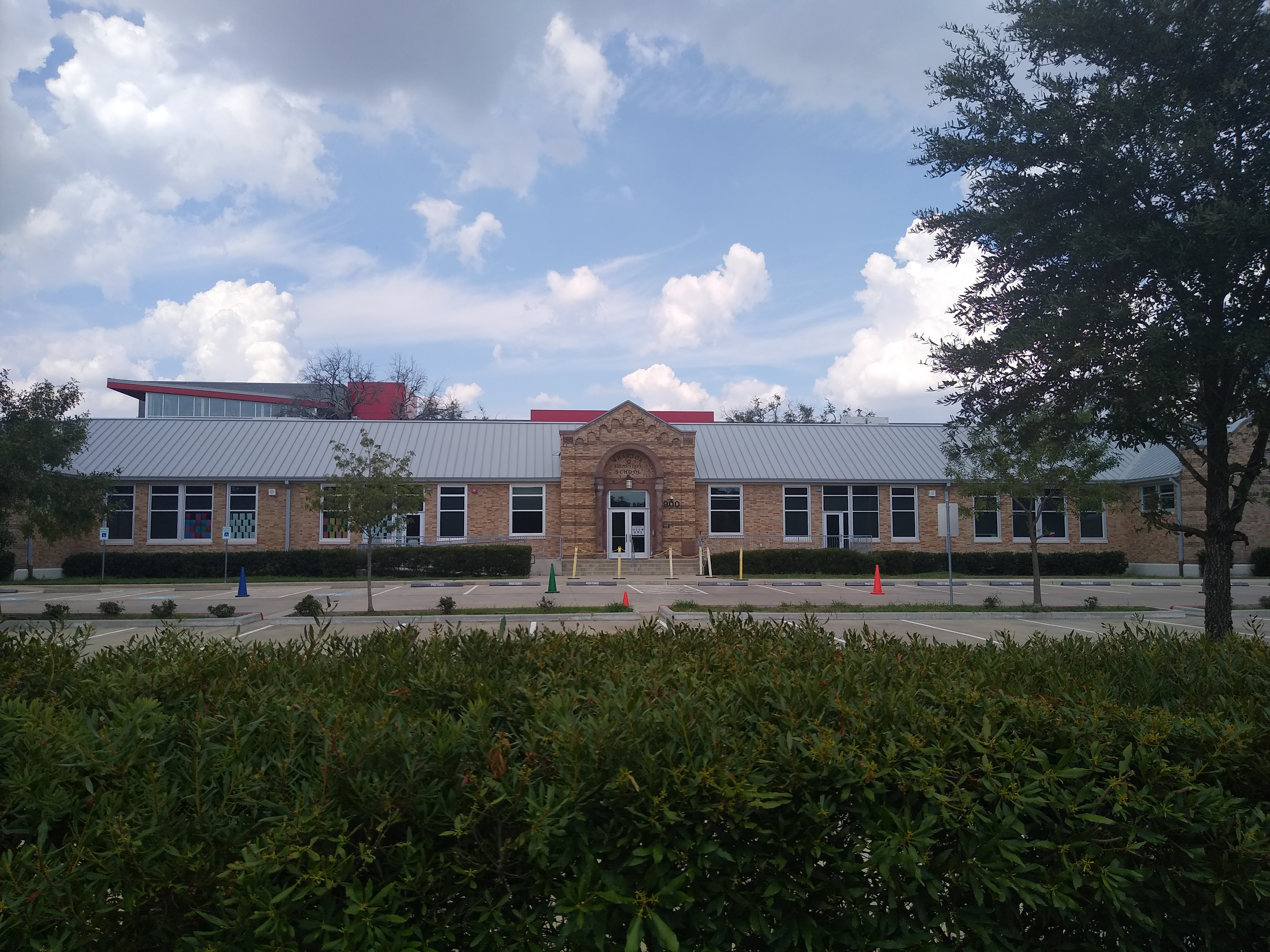
Wharton Dual Language Academy

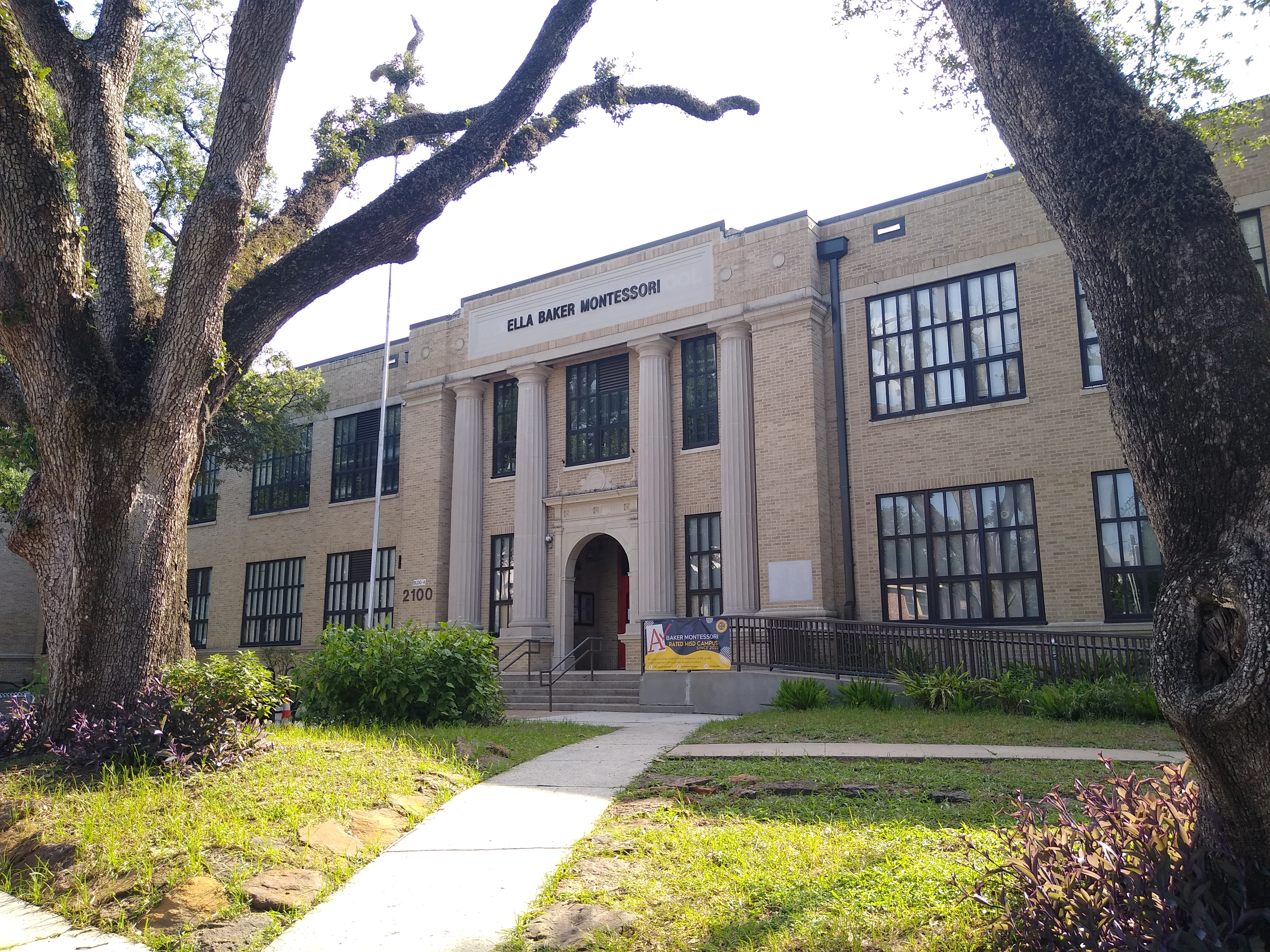
Baker Montessori School (formerly Woodrow Wilson School)

- Baker Montessori School (formerly Woodrow Wilson Montessori School, PK3 through 6 zoned, PK3-8 Montessori and fine arts magnet) (Houston)
  - Serves sections of Neartown, including parts of Montrose
- Garden Oaks K-8 School (Houston) (zoned for K-5, magnet for K-8)
  - Serves most of Garden Oaks and a section of Oak Forest
- Thomas J. Pilgrim Academy (zoned school) (Houston)
  - The school was built in 1957, on the sesquicentennial of the birth of Thomas J. Pilgrim, and opened as Thomas J. Pilgrim Elementary School. In 2006 it began adding middle school grades, and in 2007 it changed its name to its current one and moved into its current location. Principal Alma Salman arranged to have middle school grades added so the school could have more time to increase student performance so it meets their grade levels. As of 2011 85% of the students at Pilgrim are low income, and about 66% of students who are new to Pilgrim have limited proficiency of English, with Spanish and Arabic being the most common native languages. As of 2011 250 students are in grades 6–8. In 2011 Children at Risk ranked the Pilgrim middle school as the best comprehensive middle school program in Houston.
- Wharton Dual Language Academy (Houston, elementary zoned, K-8 magnet)
  - Serves sections of Neartown, including parts of Montrose

Carter G. Woodson K-8 Center in Houston formerly had PK-8; since 2018 is now has PK-5. Middle school students were rezoned to Albert Thomas Middle. Ericka Mellon of the Houston Chronicle stated in 2015 that Woodson K-8 "performs well below the district average" although most Texas accountability test scores for the school increased during the period 2013–2014. In 2015 Children at Risk ranked Woodson K-8 an "F".

=== K-8 schools ===
- Billy K. Reagan K-8 Educational Center (zoned) (opening in the 2010s)
- The Rice School (La Escuela Rice in Spanish, Houston) (alternative)

=== Secondary schools ===
==== 6-12 schools ====
- Harper Alternative School (Houston) (alternative school)
- Jane Long Academy (Houston) - has a middle school with an attendance boundary, and an alternative high school
- Sharpstown International School (Houston) (magnet school)

===== High schools =====
All high schools are in the city of Houston unless otherwise noted.

- Stephen F. Austin High School (1936)
- Bellaire High School (1955), in the city of Bellaire
- Carnegie Vanguard High School (2002)
- César E. Chávez High School (2000)
- Ebbert L. Furr High School (1961)
- Heights High School (2016–present)
- Sam Houston Math, Science, & Technology Center (1878)
- Kashmere High School (1957)
- Mirabeau B. Lamar High School (1936)
- James Madison High School (1965)
- Charles H. Milby High School (1926)
- North Forest High School (2008)
- Northside High School (2016–present)
- Scarborough High School (1968)
- Sharpstown High School (1968)
- Ross Shaw Sterling High School (1965)
- Stephen P. Waltrip High School (1959)
- Booker T. Washington High School (1893)
- Westbury High School (1961)
- Westside High School (2000)
- Phillis Wheatley High School (1927)
- Margaret Long Wisdom High School (2016–present)
- Evan E. Worthing High School (1958)
- Jack Yates High School (1926)

===== Other high schools =====
All schools are in the city of Houston unless otherwise noted.

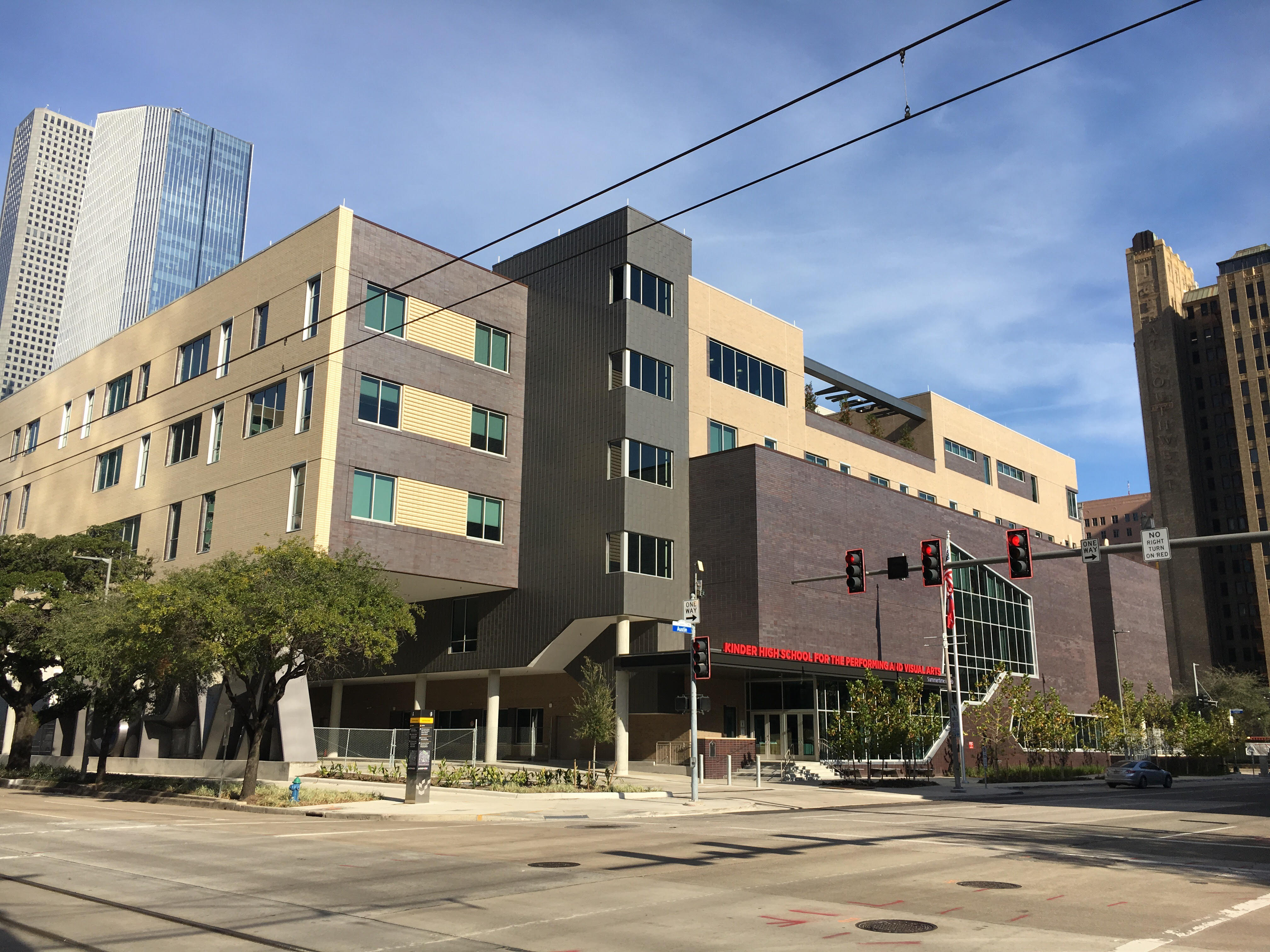
High School for the Performing and Visual Arts

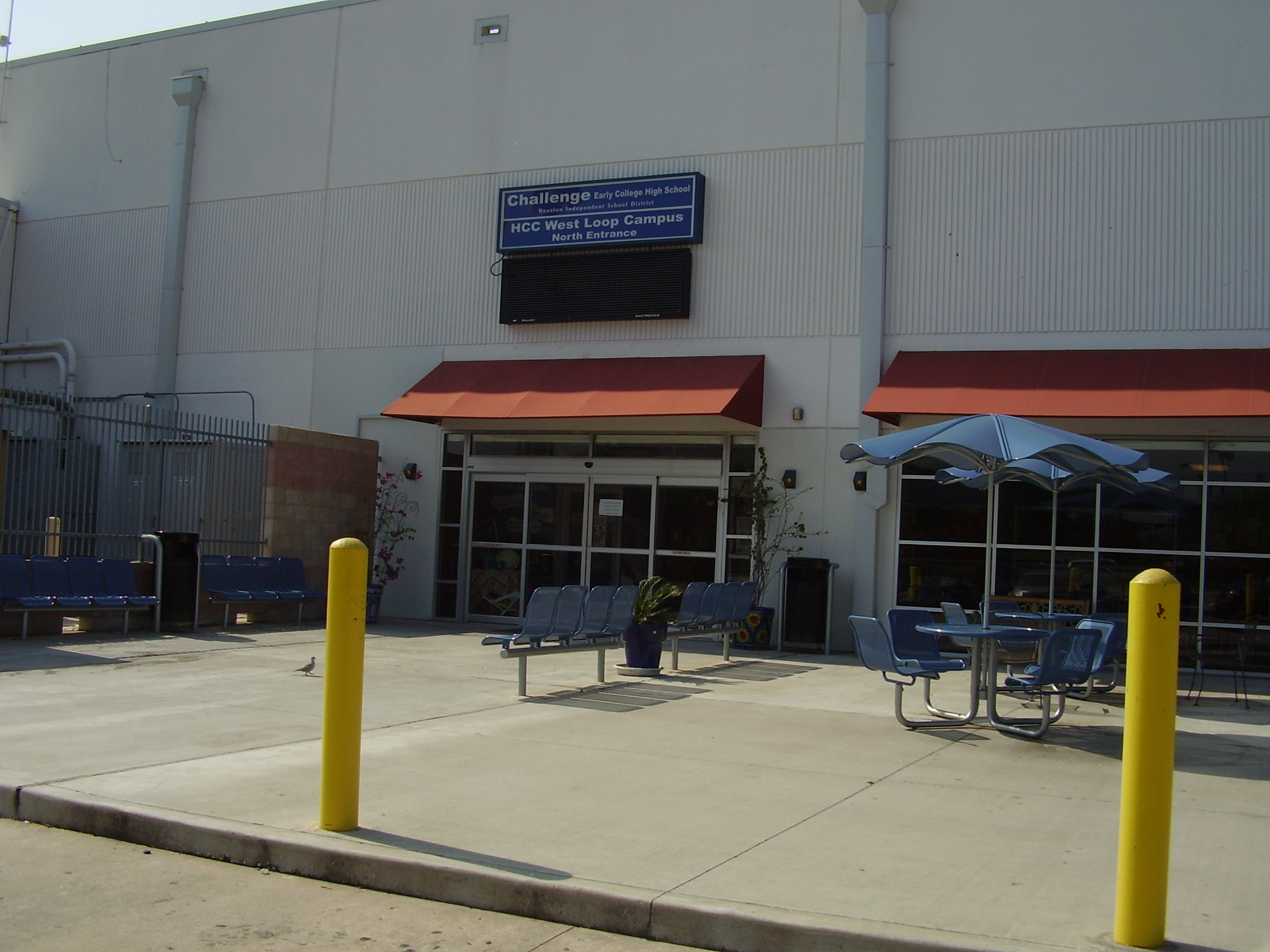
Challenge Early College High School

UIL ranking

- Accelerated Learning And Transition Academy (ALTA) - closed May 2008
- Challenge Early College High School
- Michael E. DeBakey High School for Health Professions
  - National Blue Ribbon School award winner in 1997-98
  - National Blue Ribbon School award winner in 2003
- East Early College High School
- Eastwood Academy
- Energy Institute High School
- HCC Life Skills Program
- Houston Academy for International Studies
- Barbara Jordan High School
- High School for Law and Justice (formerly High School for Law Enforcement and Criminal Justice)
- Liberty High School (formerly Newcomer Charter High School)
- Middle College High School-Felix Fraga
- Middle College High School-Gulfton
- North Houston Early College High School
- Kinder High School for the Performing and Visual Arts (HSPVA)
  - 2005 National Blue Ribbon School
- South Early College High School

===== Middle schools =====
- Crispus Attucks Middle School (Houston)
  - Serves Sunnyside and sections of South Park
  - Circa 2019 over 40% of the teachers in each school year are not present in the following school year.
- Frank Black Middle School (Houston)
  - Serves sections of Oak Forest and Garden Oaks
- Luther Burbank Middle School (Houston)
  - Burbank High School opened in 1927. The school was converted into a junior high school and received a new building in 1949. Burbank received a Vanguard magnet school program in 1979; it had been moved from Terrell Junior High. In the 1980s the grade configuration changed from grades 7–9 to 6–8, and the name was changed to Burbank Middle School.
  - In 1996 most of the students were from recent immigrants, and 87% of the students were Hispanic. The large number of immigrant students prompted the school to start special classes for bilingual students. By then the school held parent-teacher meetings in Spanish as well as English. Previously the school only had a summary of each meeting in Spanish, but as a result participation from Hispanophone parents was low.
- Ruby Sue Clifton Middle School (Houston)
  - Serves sections of Oak Forest
- Ezekiel W. Cullen Middle School (Houston)
  - Serves the Third Ward
- James S. Deady Middle School (Houston)
  - Serves sections of the East End
  - Deady's student body became a majority of racial and ethnic minorities in the early 1980s.
- Thomas A. Edison Middle School (Houston)
  - Serves Magnolia Park and other areas in the East End
- Lamar Fleming Middle School (Houston)
  - Serves a section of the Fifth Ward
- Walter W. Fondren Middle School (Houston)
  - Serves sections of Fondren Southwest, Maplewood South–North, a part of Maplewood, and a small part of Meyerland In 2015 Children at Risk ranked this school as "F".
- Richard H. Fonville Middle School] (Houston)
- Forest Brook Middle School (Houston)
  - The building opened in 1972 as Forest Brook High School. The purpose of the building changed after the 2008 merger of Forest Brook with M. B. Smiley High School. Forest Brook Middle School became a part of HISD during the merger with the North Forest Independent School District on July 1, 2013.
  - When HISD assumed control, the facilities were in a damaged state, 30-40% of students were habitually late to school, and 75-80% of students performed below grade level. Rick Fernandez became principal in 2013, and Tannisha Gentry, his assistant, succeeded him when he left to become principal of North Forest High School in 2015. Fernandez and Gentry changed the school uniforms, posted teachers in areas where students may hide, and penalized truancy with lunch detentions. Gentry added a study period and added one hour to the instructional day. Hurricane Harvey, in 2017, damaged the building and displaced students from nearby neighborhoods. By November 2017 80 students were not in attendance.
- Alexander Hamilton Middle School (Houston)
  - Serves much of the Houston Heights and a section of Independence Heights
  - Hamilton previously had the Indians as a mascot, but in 2014 it adopted a new mascot, the Huskies, due to controversies over Native American naming.
- Charles Hartman Middle School (Houston)
  - Serves Garden Villas
- Patrick Henry Middle School (Houston)
- James Hogg Middle School (Houston)
  - Serves Woodland Heights, Norhill, sections of the Houston Heights, Cottage Grove, First Ward, Sixth Ward, Rice Military, and Crestwood/Glen Cove
  - Hogg, named after Governor of Texas James Stephen Hogg, was built on land that was reserved for school usage by the developer of Norhill. James Hogg's family had donated the land occupied by the school. It has 735 students as of 2015. 87% of the students are designated as low income, and the student body is majority Hispanic. The school occupies a three-story 1920s building. The school uses the International Baccalaureate program.
  - Hogg's student body became mostly racial minority in the late 1970s. In the 2011–2012 school year, it had 700 students. 90% were Hispanic or Latino, 5% were black, and 3% were white. Almost all of the students were classified as low income through their qualifying for free or reduced lunches. As of 2011 few Woodland Heights/Norhill-area parents sent their children to Hogg, and they instead used HISD middle schools in other areas. As of 2014 the school's test scores were below average. By 2014 the IB program had been established, the number of disciplinary reports declined and became among the smallest in the entire district. There were efforts from area parents to attract graduates of Travis and Harvard elementary schools, two major feeder schools, to Hogg, and by 2014 the number of children from Travis and Harvard matriculating to Hogg increased by fewer than 50%. In 2015 Annette Baird of the Houston Chronicle wrote that historically "had a reputation for poor student performance and low enrollment" but that it was increasing in popularity with local parents.
- Holland Middle School
  - Serves Pleasantville, Clinton Park, Port Houston, and sections of Jacinto City
- Francis Scott Key Middle School (Houston)
- Bob Lanier Middle School (formerly Sidney Lanier Middle School) (Houston)
- Audrey H. Lawson Middle School (formerly Richard W. "Dick" Dowling Middle School) (Houston)
  - Serves Hiram Clarke, Brentwood, Corinthian Pointe, City Park, and Almeda It opened on February 9, 1968. Frank Tritico had given the school district a paper highlighting the life of Richard William "Dick" Dowling, and therefore the district chose to name the school after him. It replaced the former junior high school component of Madison High School and had an initial enrollment of 1,107. At first it had grades 7-8, with the 9th grade opening in 1969. Its magnet program began on January 9, 1993, making it Richard W. Dowling Middle School of Fine Arts; the HISD board approved the establishment of the magnet program the previous November. As of 2009, 99% of the student body consists of racial and ethnic minorities. In 2016 the HISD board sought to rename schools named after officials in the Confederate States of America; it was renamed after Wheeler Avenue Baptist Church first lady Audrey H. Lawson that year. Groundbreaking for Lawson's new 1,500 student, $59 million, three-story campus occurred in September 2016. Madison High School is located in Hiram Clarke and serves residents of the Hiram Clarke area.
- John Marshall Middle School (Houston) [opened in 1914 as North End Junior High School]
  - Serves the Near North Side, Lindale Park, and a small part of Downtown Houston
  - Marshall's student body became mostly racial minority in the early 1960s.
- John L. McReynolds Middle School (Houston)
  - Serves Denver Harbor and sections of the Fifth Ward
- Meyerland Performing and Visual Arts Middle School (formerly Albert Sidney Johnston Middle School) (Houston)
  - Serves most of Meyerland, Willowbend, Willow Meadows
  - It was originally to be named Theodore Roosevelt Middle School, but veterans of the U.S. Civil War fighting for the Confederate States of America complained, and the district ultimately named it after Albert Sidney Johnston. The current Johnston Middle School opened in 1959. On May 12, 2016 the school received its current name.
  - In 2010 the school had about 1,400 students, with 650 in the magnet program.
- Yolanda Black Navarro Middle School (formerly Stonewall Jackson Middle School) (Houston)
  - Serves Eastwood, Idylwood, the Second Ward, and some other sections of the East End, as well as East Downtown
- Daniel Ortiz, Jr. Middle School (Houston)
  - Serves Park Place, Glenbrook Valley, and Thai Xuan Village
  - It was named after Daniel Ortiz, Jr. (1936-1994), an HISD employee from the East End who served as a teacher and administrator, serving as HISD assistant superintendent. He retired in 1992.
- John J. Pershing Middle School, in Houston, is a fine arts, neighborhood, and gifted and talented Middle School. Pershing celebrated its 75th anniversary in the 2003–2004 school year.
- Pin Oak Middle School (Bellaire) is a foreign language magnet, and gifted and talented Middle School. Pin Oak does not have an attendance zone, students have to apply to get in.
  - It is an "application-only" school that accepts students by application. Anyone living in Houston ISD may apply for the Foreign Languages magnet program, and the pupils who are zoned to Meyerland Performing and Arts Middle School (formerly Johnston Middle School), Jane Long Middle School, or Pershing middle schools may apply to Pin Oak's regular program. The 174,500-square-foot (16,210 m^{2}) building sits on an 18-acre (73,000 m^{2}) campus. The school was named a National Blue Ribbon School in 2008. The Bellaire Examiner stated in 2010 "Pin Oak's innovative magnet and Vanguard programs have earned it honors and many more applicants each year than it can accept." In 2011 Isaiah Carey of KRIV said that Pin Oak "is seen as one of the best in HISD for learning and education,[...]" Pin Oak is across the street from the Houston Community College System's West Loop Center, and the Challenge Early College High School (which is located inside HCC's West Loop Center), both of which are located in the city of Houston (Glenmont Street is on the border of Houston and Bellaire).
- Paul Revere Middle School (Houston) (6–8)
  - Serves parts of Westchase, Briargrove Park and Walnut Bend as well as a small section of Piney Point Village
- W. I. Stevenson Middle School (Houston)
- Sugar Grove Middle School (Houston)
  - Serves sections of Sharpstown and sections of Chinatown as well as other parts of the Southwest Management District
  - It was established in 2008; the campus was previously the unzoned relief elementary school Sugar Grove Elementary School, named after a church that previously occupied the school's current location.
  - In the period 2009 to 2019, the school had "improvement required" ratings from the State of Texas for four of those years. Each year, about 37% of the teachers present in one school year are not in the next. There were five principals in a period circa 2009 to 2019. Circa 2014, 925 students in the Sugar Grove attendance zone attended schools other than Sugar Grove middle. This increased to 1,200 circa 2019.
- Tanglewood Middle School (formerly Henry W. Grady Middle School) (Houston)
  - Serves Tanglewood and Briargrove as well as a small section of Hunters Creek Village
  - Grady Middle School opened in 1992. The campus previously housed an elementary school, and was re-opened as a middle school because area parents thought Revere Middle School was too far away.
- Albert Thomas Middle School (Houston)
- Louie Welch Middle School (Houston)
  - Serves sections of Fondren Southwest and Missouri City
  - Welch's campus was built for about 1,133 students. In 1996 it had 1,700 students. There were also issues with the sewage system in the temporary building area as well as roof leaks and water issues from condensation.
  - Welch previously had the Warriors as a mascot, but in 2014 it adopted a new mascot, the Wolf Pack, due to controversies over Native American naming.
- West Briar Middle School (Houston)
  - Serves Parkway Villages, Lakes of Parkway, and Briarhills
- McKinley C. Williams Middle School (Houston)
  - Serves Acres Homes and a part of Independence Heights

The Carter G. Woodson School formerly had middle school levels, later became PK-8, and now is PK-5. Notable alumni of the middle school:

- South Park Mexican (Carlos Coy) - Also attended Milby High School - rapper
- Scarface (Brad Terrence Jordan)

===== Other middle schools =====
- Baylor College of Medicine Biotech Academy at Rusk (Formerly the Rusk School) (Houston)
- Dominion Academy Charter School (Houston)
- Energized For Excellence Middle School (Charter) (Houston)
- High School Ahead Academy (Houston)
- Las Américas Middle School (Houston) (Moved to 6501 Bellaire Boulevard from 5909 Glenmont in 2007)
- 2003 National Blue Ribbon School
- The Medical and Health Professions Academy at Ryan Middle School - Opened 2013 in the former Ryan Middle School
- North District Alternative Middle School (Houston)
- Project Chrysalis Middle School (Houston)
- Pro-Vision School (Houston)
- Soar Center (Houston)
- William A. Lawson Institute for Peace and Prosperity (Walipp) Preparatory Academy for Boys (Houston)

=== Early childhood centers ===
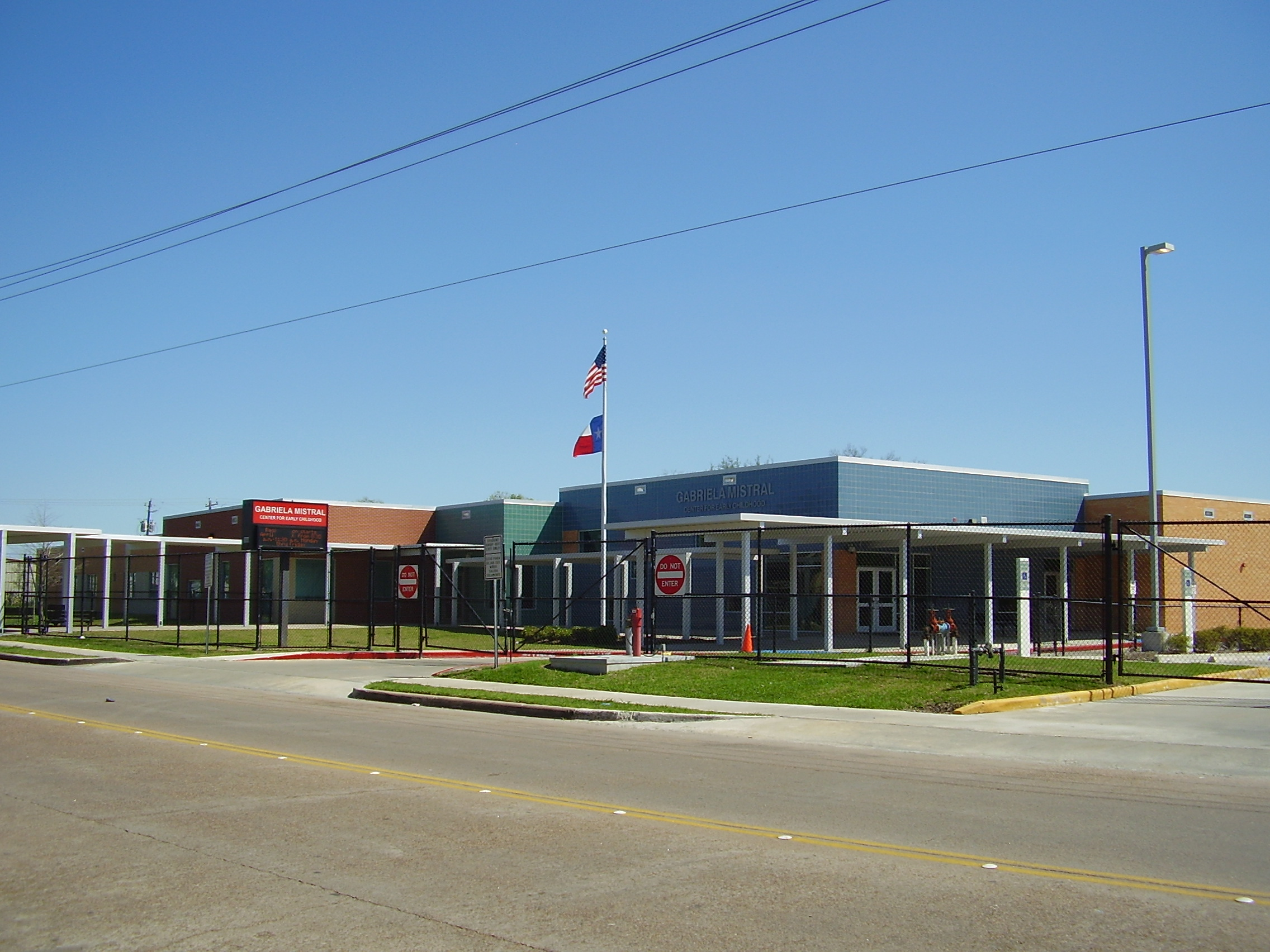
Gabriela Mistral Early Childhood Center

- Ashford Early Childhood Center (Houston)
- Bellfort Early Childhood Center (Houston)
- David "Davy" Crockett Early Childhood Center (Houston) (The campus was formerly Brock Elementary School - Elementary students were rezoned to Crockett ES)
- Early Childhood Center (Houston, opening August 2005)
- Fonwood Early Childhood Center
  - Originally Fonwood Elementary School of the North Forest Independent School District, it was built in 1964. Prior to NFISD's closure, the district had been planning to close Fonwood Elementary. HISD converted Fonwood into the area's early childhood center after the takeover effective July 1, 2013. It was one of the older schools of NFISD. HISD released statements highlighting the poor condition of Fonwood Elementary when doing a post-takeover tour of the school. In a tour of the campus in July 2013, Terry Grier noted a playground in poor condition, water fountains too tall for children, exposed wires, violins without strings stored in the music room, and a restroom which had a bad odor. The teacher's lounge had a plush couch, upholstered chairs, flowers, and a flatscreen television. HISD did not state that NFISD was planning to close Fonwood. It became an early childhood center when NFISD merged into HISD on July 1, 2013.
- Sharon Goldstein Halpin Early Childhood Center (Houston)
- Martin Luther King Jr. Early Childhood Center (Houston)
- Ninfa Laurenzo Early Childhood Center (Houston)
- Gabriela Mistral Early Childhood Center (Houston, opened August 2005)

=== Interagency alternative schools ===
- Beechnut Academy Southeast
- Beechnut Academy Southwest

=== Online learning ===
HISD has an online high school offering regular, AP, and credit-recovery courses at its virtual school. For grades 3-12 offers online schooling through Texas Connections Academy @ Houston, which is operated under contract by Connections Academy, a Maryland-based company which works with public and other schools to provide online education.

== Defunct schools ==
=== Former K-12 schools ===
- Victory Preparatory Academy

=== Former secondary schools ===
- New Aspirations Charter School

==== Former 7-12 schools ====
- Contemporary Learning Center (Houston) (alternative school)
- Kay On-Going Education Center - closed in 2006, merged with CLC
- Leader's Academy High School for Business and Academic Success - merged into Victory Preparatory Academy in 2011
- Terrell Alternative School (Houston) (originally a middle school, closed in fall 1991, later an alternative middle school, closed in 2001)

==== Former high schools ====
Zoned

- Cottage Grove High School (5410 Cornish, Houston) (Opened 1915, converted to Stevenson Elementary School in 1927)
- San Jacinto High School (Houston) (Now became part of the Houston Community College Central Campus)
- M.C. Williams High School

Alternative

- DeVry Advantage Academy (Houston)
- Foley's Academy (Houston)
  - Foley's Academy (1987–2000) was an alternative high school where students advanced at their own pace. It had one-on-one learning and catered to at-risk students to prevent them from dropping out. Former first lady Barbara Bush and Dr. Joan Raymond headed the opening ceremony by signing in the first three students: Twanna Lynn, Shannon Gladney and Robert Martinez.
- New Aspirations Academy High School (Houston) (closed 2012)
- Ninth Grade Academy (Houston)
- Middle College For Technology Careers (Houston) (opened in 1994, closed in 2006)
- Houston Drop Back In Academy (Houston) - Closed

High school programs formerly affiliated

- Gulf Coast Trades Center (unincorporated Walker County) - Established in 1971, no longer affiliated with HISD in 1988.

==== Former K-8 and 1-8 schools ====
- Edgar M. Gregory School (Houston) (zoned school)
  - In the Fourth Ward, it closed in 1980, with students moved to Lincoln Junior High School, which became Gregory-Lincoln Education Center. The building became the African American Library at the Gregory School, which opened in 2009, after it was vacant for about two decades.
- E.O. Smith Education Center (Houston) (zoned school)
  - By Spring 2011 Atherton and E.O. Smith were to be consolidated, with a new K-8 campus in the Atherton site.
- George Washington School (4701 Dickson, Houston) (was George Washington Junior High School at an earlier point) - Closed in 1980 due to low enrollment. Campus housed High School for Law Enforcement and Criminal Justice until it was sold to the adjacent St. Thomas High School.

Alternative:

- Kandy Stripe Academy (Houston) - Closed in 2018 prior to the fall semester

==== Former middle schools ====
Former zoned schools

- Lockett Junior High School (303 West Dallas, opened in former Booker T. Washington High School building in 1959, closed June 1968)
- Longfellow Junior High School (2202 St. Emanuel, Houston) (Built in 1913, converted into Dunbar Elementary in 1961)
- Miller Junior High School (Houston) (Campus now houses Young Women's College Preparatory Academy)
- James D. Ryan Middle School (Houston) - Closed in 2013, building now used for The Medical and Health Professions Academy at Ryan Middle School
- Terrell Middle School (Houston) (Opened 1966, later became an alternative school, closed in 2001) - As of 2014 it serves as an immigration detention center for children
  - In 1996 its students had disciplinary records that caused them to be expelled from their previous schools. Circa 1996 the annual cost per student incurred by each student was over $16,000; around that time the average per-student cost in Houston-area school districts was $4,000-$5,000.

Other schools

- Kaleidoscope Middle School (Houston) (moved to 6501 Bellaire Boulevard from 5909 Glenmont in 2007) - combined into Long Middle in 2012

=== Former early childhood centers ===
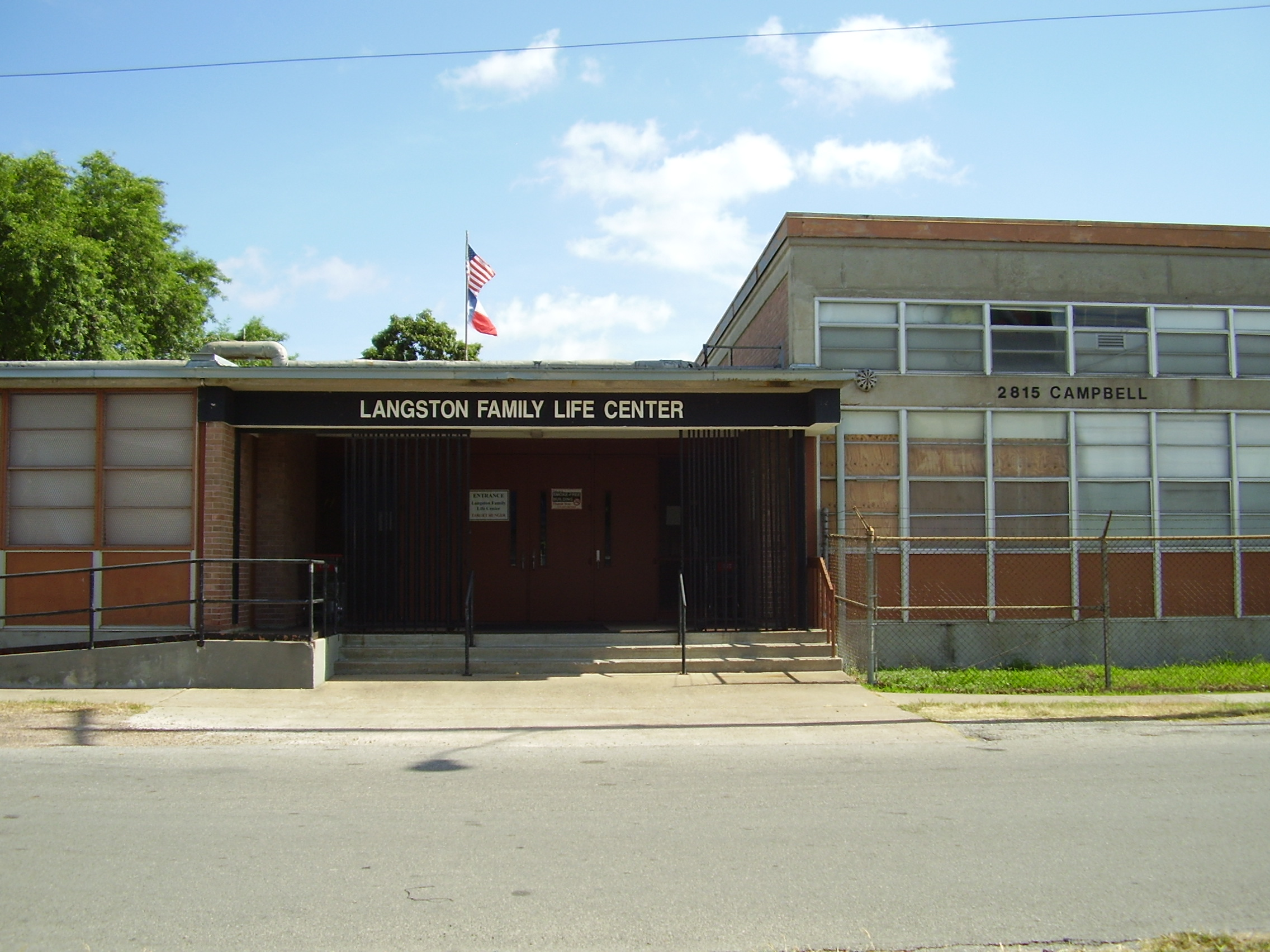
Langston Family Life Center, formerly Langston Early Childhood Center

2 in Houston

- Concord Early Childhood Center (Houston)
  - Concord, located on the site of Kashmere Gardens Elementary School, closed due to low enrollment. The students will be a part of the Kashmere Gardens population.
- Langston Early Childhood Center (2815 Campbell, Opened 1994, closed May 2004, Students transferred to Crawford ES)
- Las Américas Early Childhood Development Center (5909 Glenmont, Houston) (5909 Glenmont, 77081) (Closed in 2007)
  - Originally the preschool was located in the clubhouse of the aforementioned apartment complex. It later received its own building, which had three stories.
- Wheatley Child Development (4900 Market, Houston, Opened 1993, closed 2007)

=== Former alternative centers ===
- The Harris County Youth Village in far southern Pasadena, west of Seabrook, opened in 1972. The center was no longer affiliated with HISD in 1997.
