= Mickey Leland College Preparatory Academy for Young Men =

High school in Texas, United States

Coordinates: 29.776526°N 95.335122°W

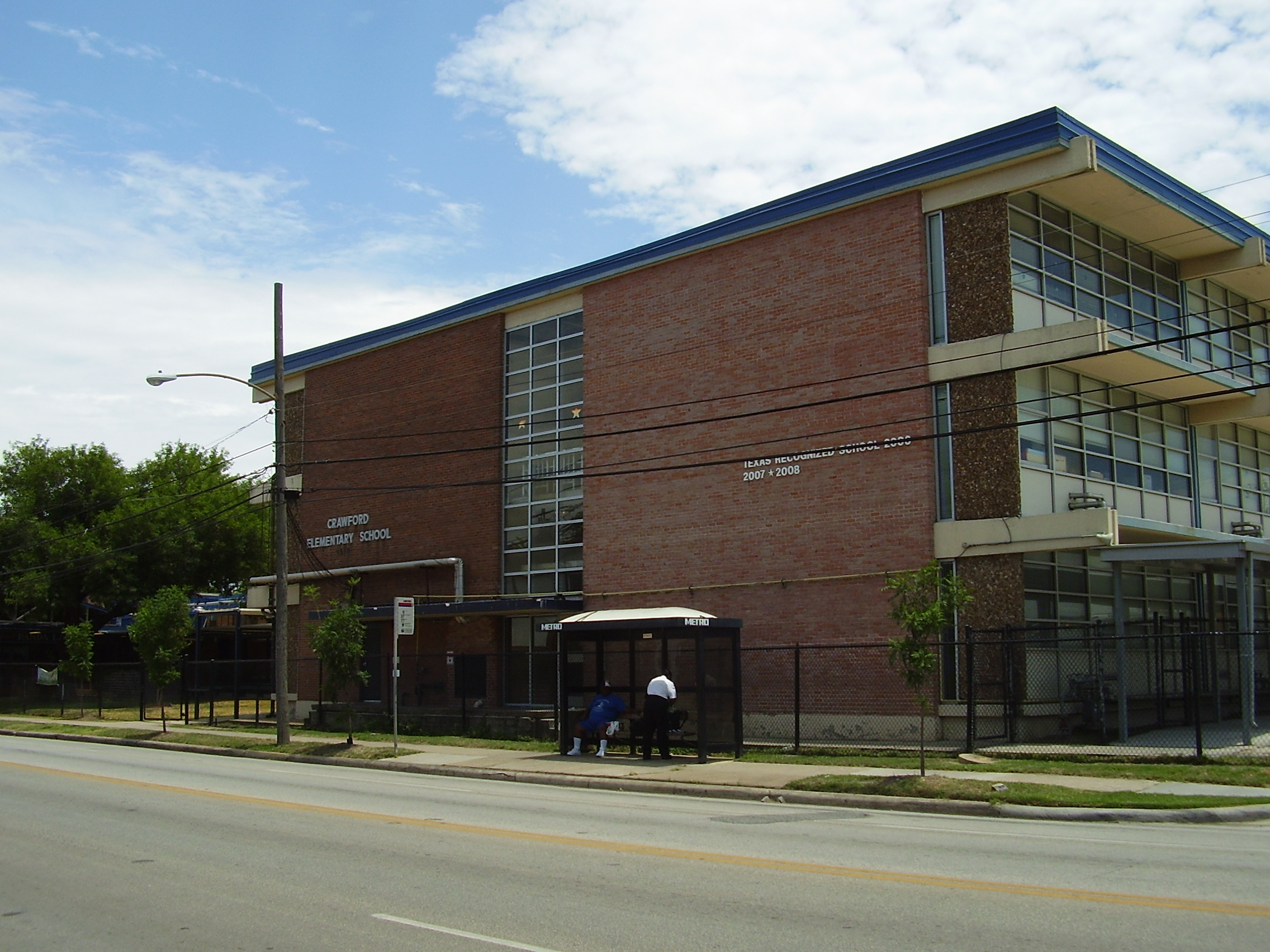
Crawford Elementary School, which was previously the site of the YMCPA

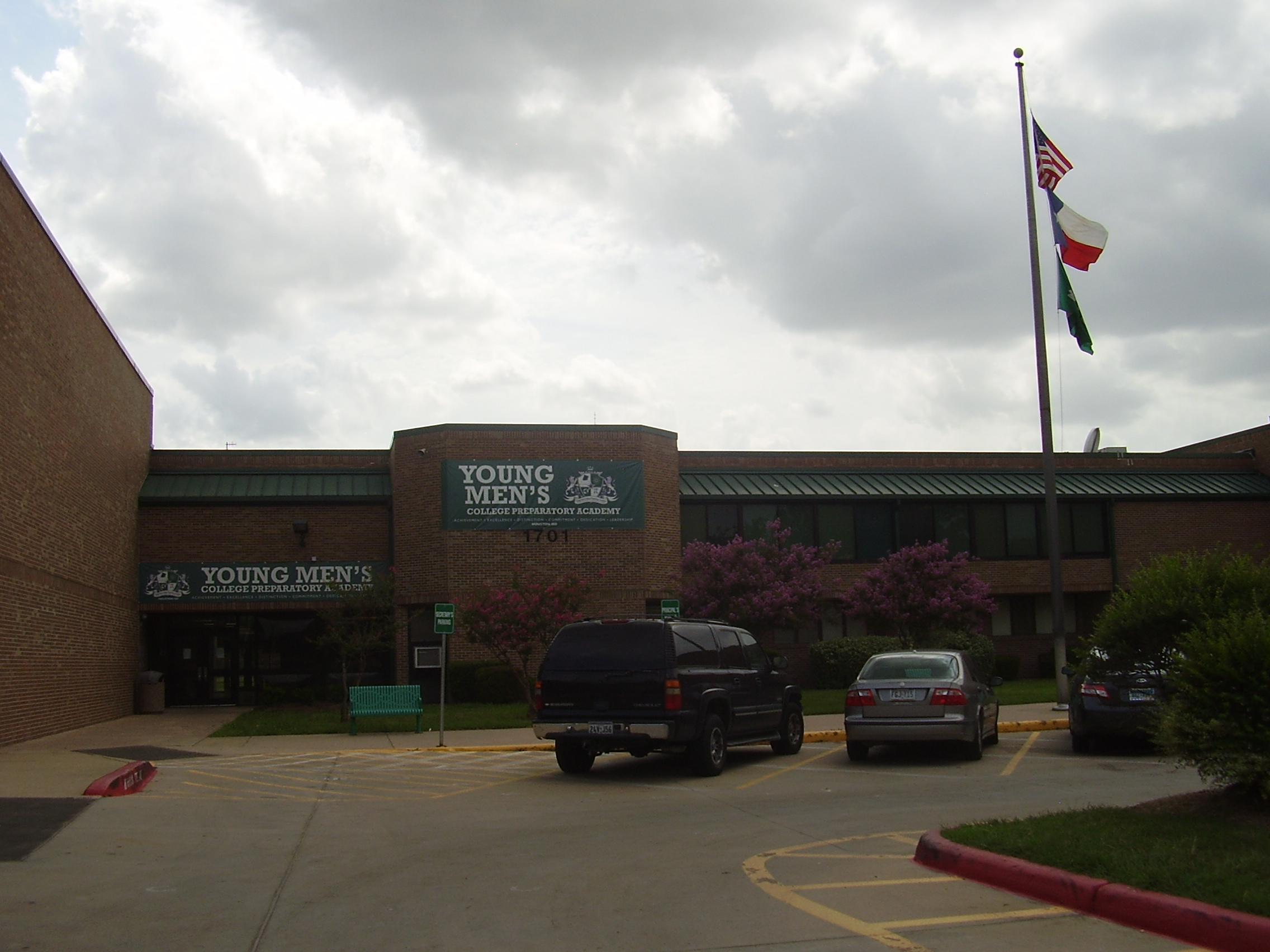
Former Young Men's College Preparatory Academy campus at E.O. Smith

Mickey Leland College Preparatory Academy for Young Men (MLCPA), originally Young Men's College Preparatory Academy at E. O. Smith (YMCPA), is a university preparatory secondary school for boys in the Fifth Ward, Houston, Texas. It is a part of the Houston Independent School District. It is named after Mickey Leland.

The school opened in August, 2011 for the 6th and 9th grades, and would gradually become a middle and high school. It first opened in the E.O. Smith Education Center campus in the Fifth Ward. The district modeled the school off of the Chicago Urban Prep Academy in Chicago. The school has admission requirements. It later moved to the former Crawford Elementary School, in both the Fifth Ward and in Northside.

Some Fifth Ward community members expressed disappointment that the previous E.O. Smith students would be displaced by the opening of the new magnet school.

The HISD board approved the renaming of the school to Leland College Preparatory Academy in 2014.

HISD built the permanent Leland school on the site of the former Carter Career Center, which once served as Wheatley High School and E.O. Smith. The new building used a similar architectural style to the original. A grand opening ceremony was held in 2017.

Effective 2026, Fleming and McReynolds middle schools were scheduled to move onto the property of Leland Middle and merge into a comprehensive middle school, Fleming-McReynolds Middle School, that shares the property with the boys' school.

== See also ==
- Young Women's College Preparatory Academy
