= Carter Career Center =

High school in Houston, Texas, US

Coordinates: 29.7765°N 95.3355°W

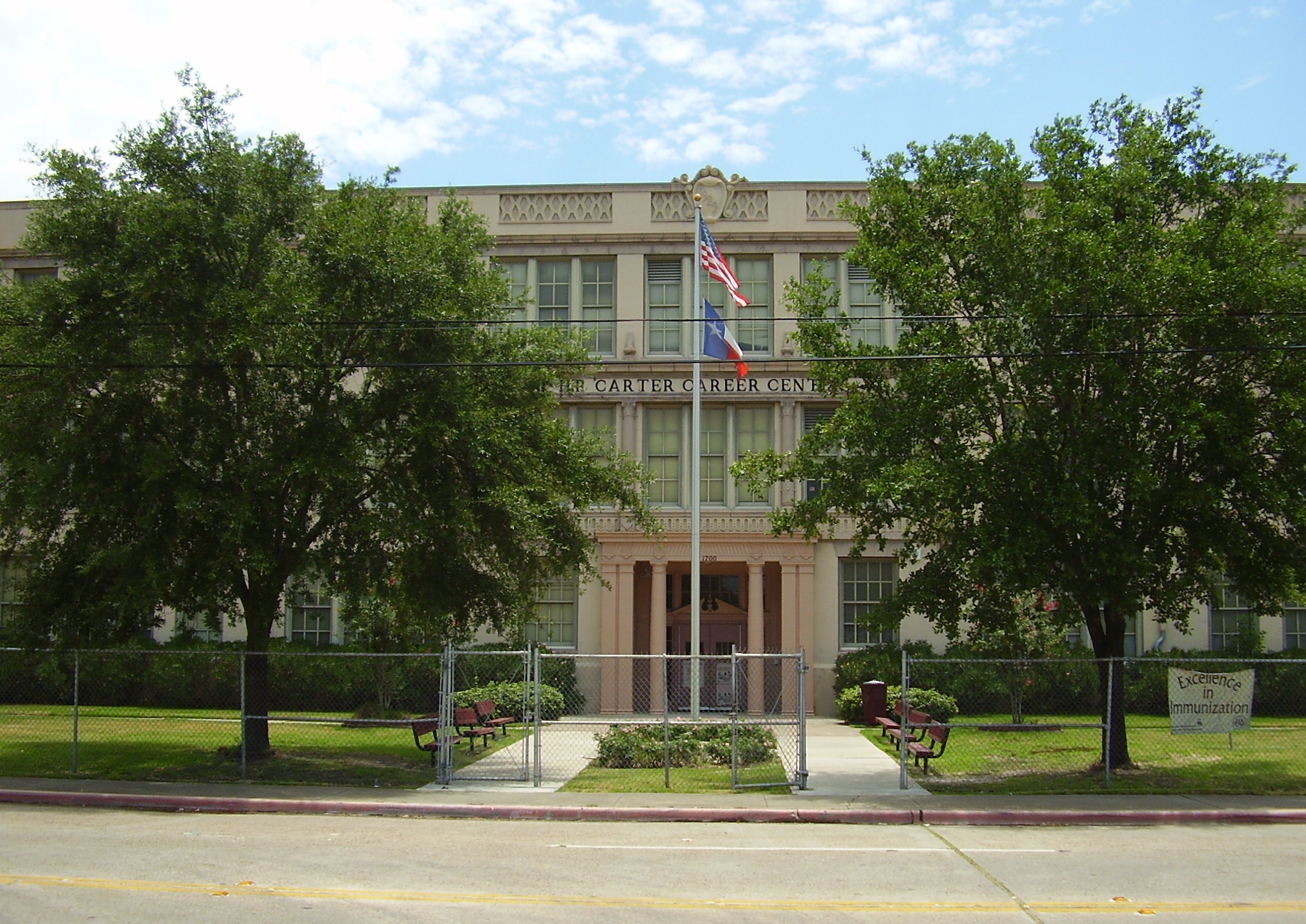

Location
- 1700 Gregg Street; Houston, Texas; United States

Information
- School type: High school
- Established: 1929
- Closed: 2011
- Grades: 6-12

Howard P. Carter Career Center was a high school in the Fifth Ward area of Houston, Texas. The school, serving grades 6 through 12, was a part of the Houston Independent School District. The school served as a vocational school and pregnant girls' school. Carter Career Center had many students who are single parents. It had a day-care center that is supported by corporations, the state, the federal government, and foundations. After the closure of Carter, the building housed the DeVry Advantage Academy.

== Name ==
Howard Payne Carter was a teacher and former soldier from Tennessee. He was the first African-American secretary of the Young Men’s Christian Association.

== History ==
Carter Career Center was established in 1929.

The campus, built in 1913, originally housed McGowan Elementary School, a school for white children. On January 31, 1927 Wheatley High School first opened at 3415 Lyons Avenue in the former McGowan Elementary School building. In 1949 Wheatley moved into a new campus. E.O. Smith Education Center opened in the former Wheatley building in 1950. During the beginning of the 1979–1980 school year, E.O. Smith moved into its current facility. Carter Career Center moved to the McGowen/Wheatley/Smith former building.

In 2006, Kay On Going School's separate campus closed and the program moved into Carter Career Center. A $4.5 million addition, funded through a 2004 bond issue, was opened in August 2007. This included culinary classrooms, high-tech laboratories, and a nursing school.

Carter Career Center was closed in 2011. The building was demolished in 2014.
