= High School for Law and Justice =

Magnet school in Texas, United States

Coordinates: 29.7386°N 95.3473°W

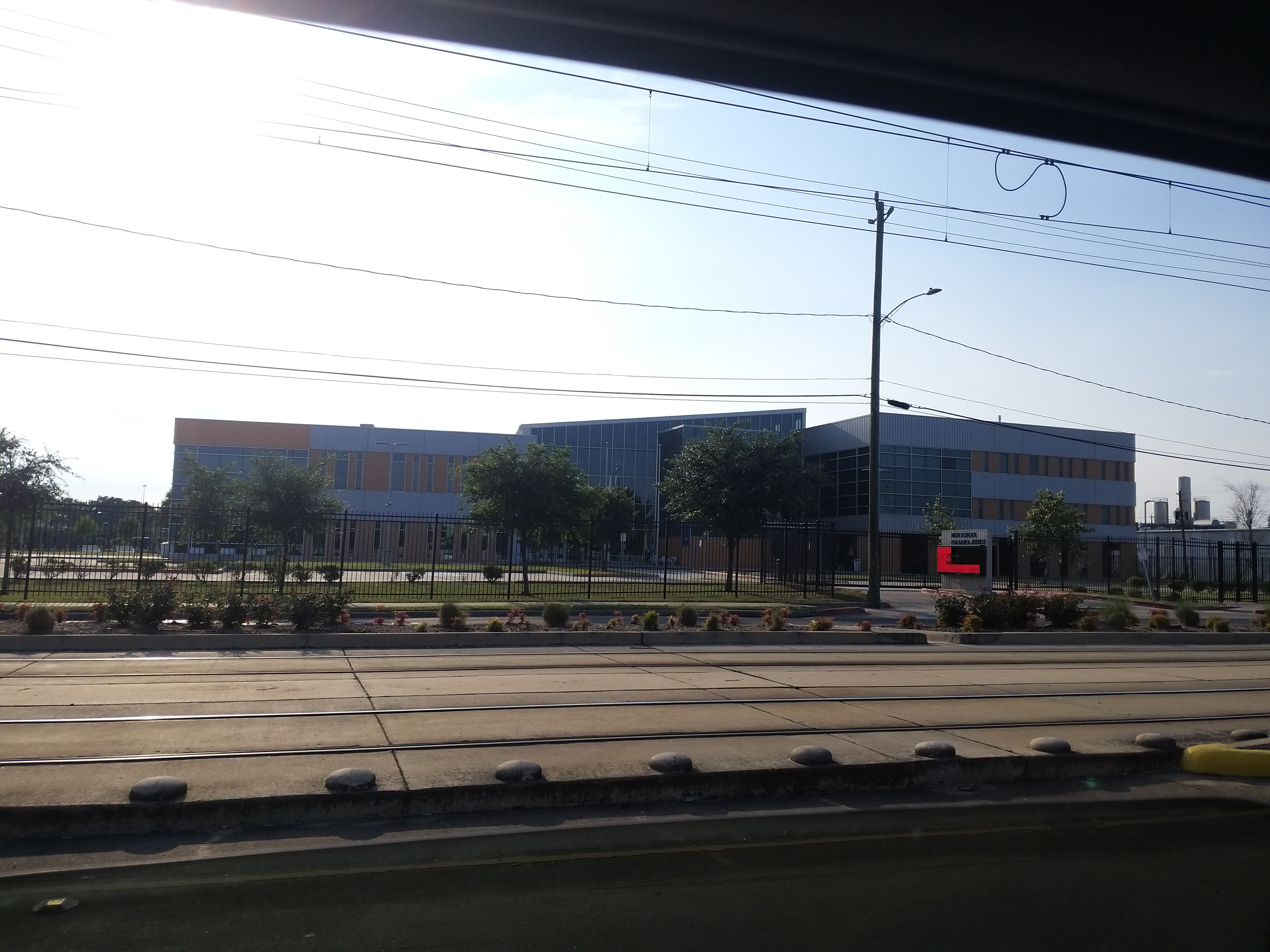
High School for Law and Justice (current campus)

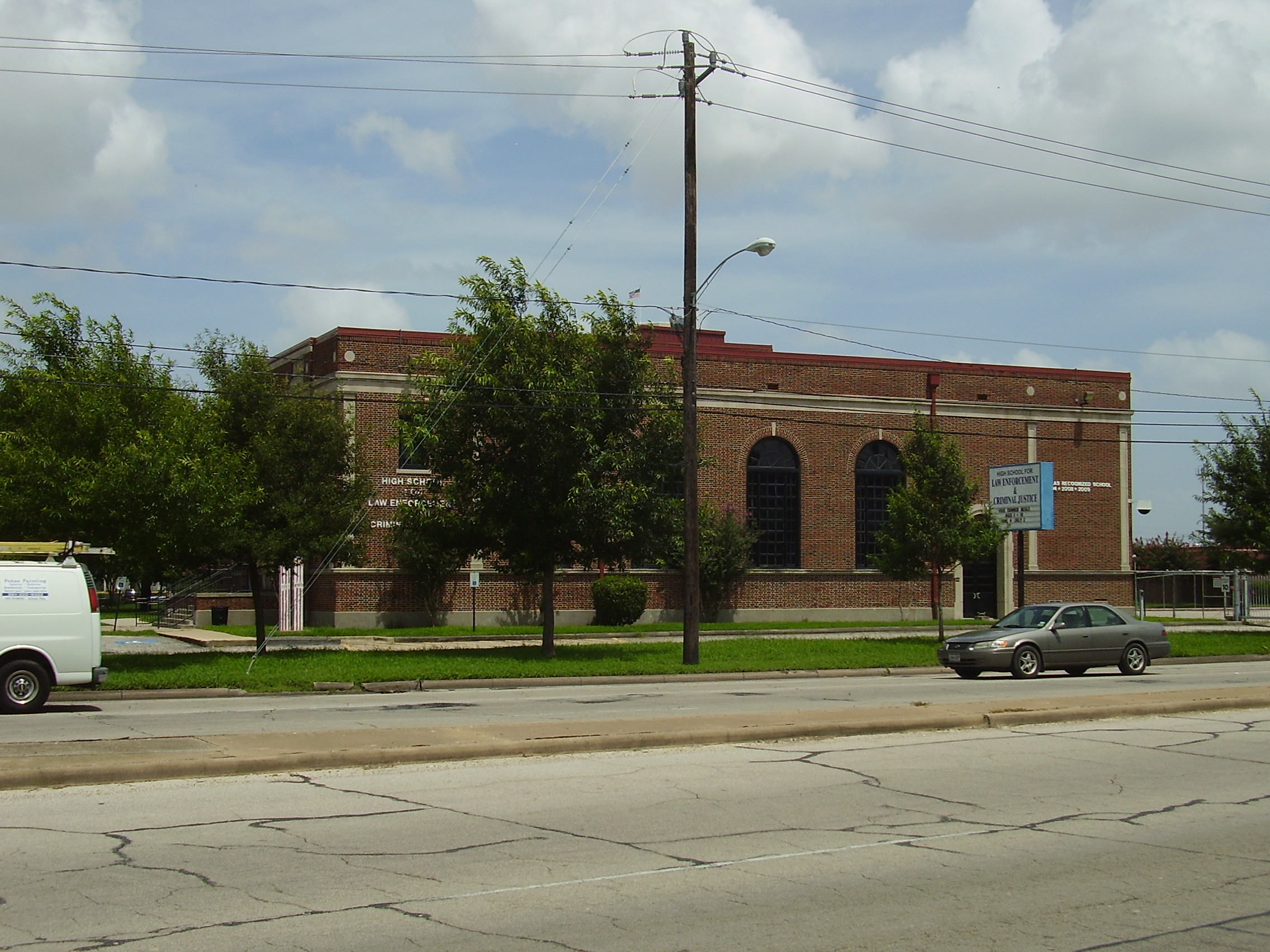
High School for Law Enforcement and Criminal Justice (former campus on Dickson)

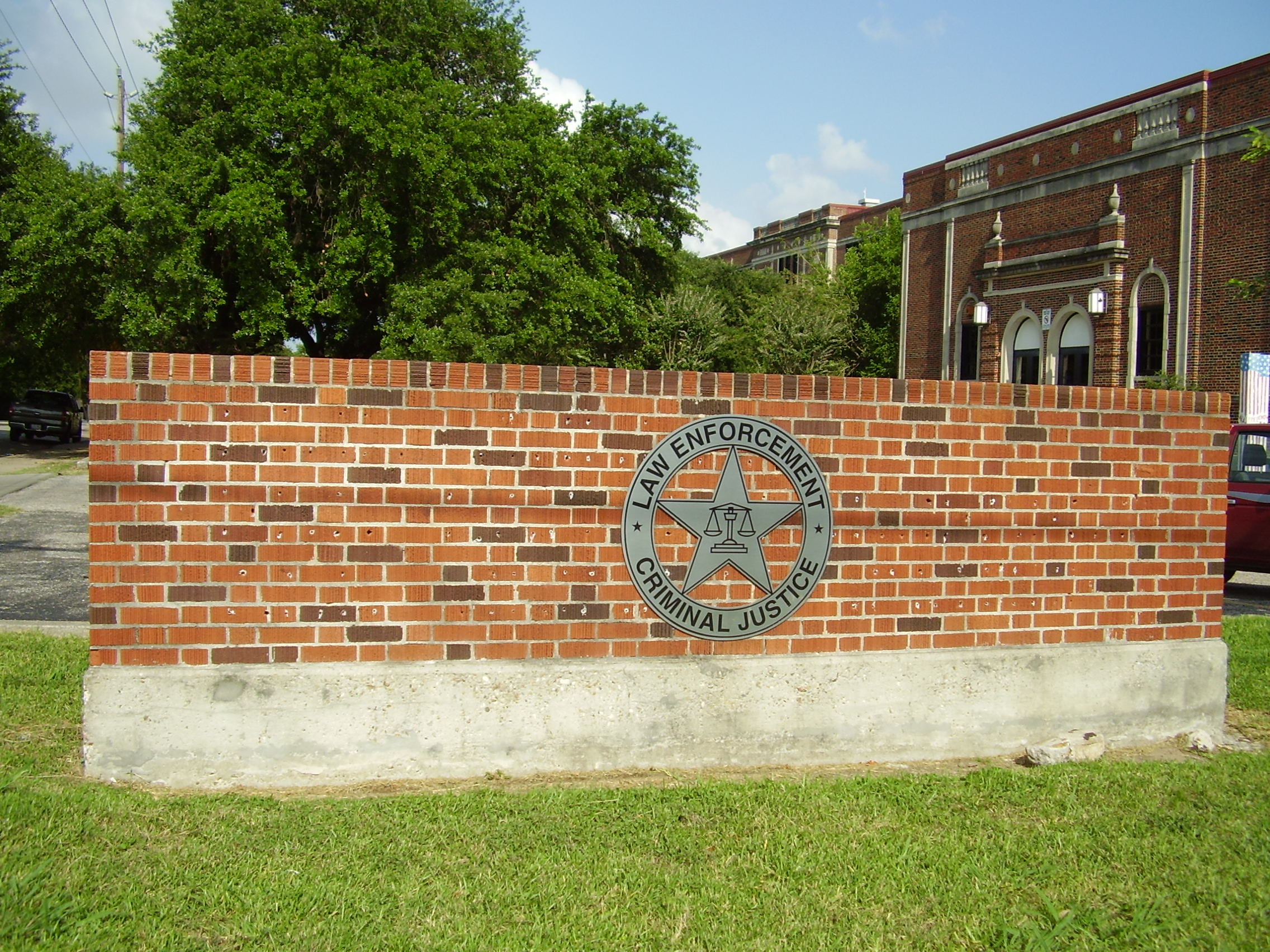
High School for Law Enforcement and Criminal Justice (former campus on Dickson)

High School for Law and Justice (HSLJ), formerly the High School for Law Enforcement and Criminal Justice (LE/CJ in short), is a high school located in Houston, Texas, United States. The school serves grades 9 through 12 and is a part of the Houston Independent School District.

The current campus is in East Downtown.

HSLJ is an all-magnet high school that has Houston ISD's magnet program for law enforcement and criminal justice. Children from surrounding neighborhoods are not automatically eligible for HSLJ; pupils in the surrounding area are zoned to Wheatley High School. Prospective students are required to take a test for admission.

Students enrolled a HSLJ are taught how to operate in either the Law Enforcement or Criminal Justice Fields.

In 2014 the HISD board voted to rename the school the High School for Law and Justice. This was effective in 2016.

== History ==
Houston ISD, the Houston Police Department, and the Mayor's Office cooperated to establish the law enforcement program on three separate campuses. By 1980 the district decided to consolidate the program to one campus. HSLECJ opened on Monday, January 19, 1981, in the former George Washington School building. It became the first law enforcement special curricula high school in the United States.

In 2012 an item to rename the school "High School for Law and Justice" was removed from the HISD board agenda. In the fall of 2012 the HSLECJ campus had an estimated value of $26 million.

A new HSLECJ was built to replace the former campus, near the intersection of Coyle and Scott. It was scheduled to open in 2016, when the name change was to take effect. HISD board president Diana Davila appeared at the site while it was under construction and ordered the removal of an already-installed wall; the removal had a cost of $20,000. The current 105,000-square-foot (9,800 m^{2}) facility opened in 2018.

== Location ==
HSLJ was located on an 11-acre (4.5 ha) property at the intersection of Shepherd Drive and Memorial Drive, adjacent to St. Thomas High School, a private Roman Catholic high school. In July 2013 St. Thomas High School and the investment group AV Dickson Street were engaged in a dispute over the acquisition of the HSLECJ property. On Thursday July 18, 2013 the HISD board rejected both requests. David Thompson, the HISD board attorney, stated that both bidders violated the district's code of silence policy. On October 15, 2013, Elk Mountain Ltd. made a cash bid of $47,927,114, while St. Thomas had made a bid of $45 million. In November 2013 St. Thomas offered $60 million for the campus. The final deadline for bids was November 1, 2013. Gary Hansel, the HISD real estate manager, stated that he did not know if Elk Mountain and AV Dickson Street were the same group, but that they shared a broker. In November of that year HISD sold the former HSLECJ to St. Thomas.

== Demographics ==
In 2022 the school had 488 students

The school primarily consists of Hispanic and African American women

== School uniform ==
HSLJ. requires school uniforms. School requires the wear of navy, black, grey, or white polo shirt with school insignia, and navy or black trousers, they may also wear blue jeans all week long. On Fridays, students are permitted to wear a Friday shirt (such as club shirts and class shirts).

In 2007 principal Carol Mosteit said that the uniforms were intended for students to, in the words of Sarah Viren of the Houston Chronicle, "look the part" for law enforcement jobs that the students may take in the future.

== Notable alumni ==
- Leondra Gay - Rapper
