= DeVry Advantage Academy (Texas) =

High school in Houston, Texas

Coordinates: 29.7765°N 95.3357°W

DeVry Advantage Academy and CLC at H.P. Carter
- Texas; United States

Information
- Established: 2011
- Closed: 2012

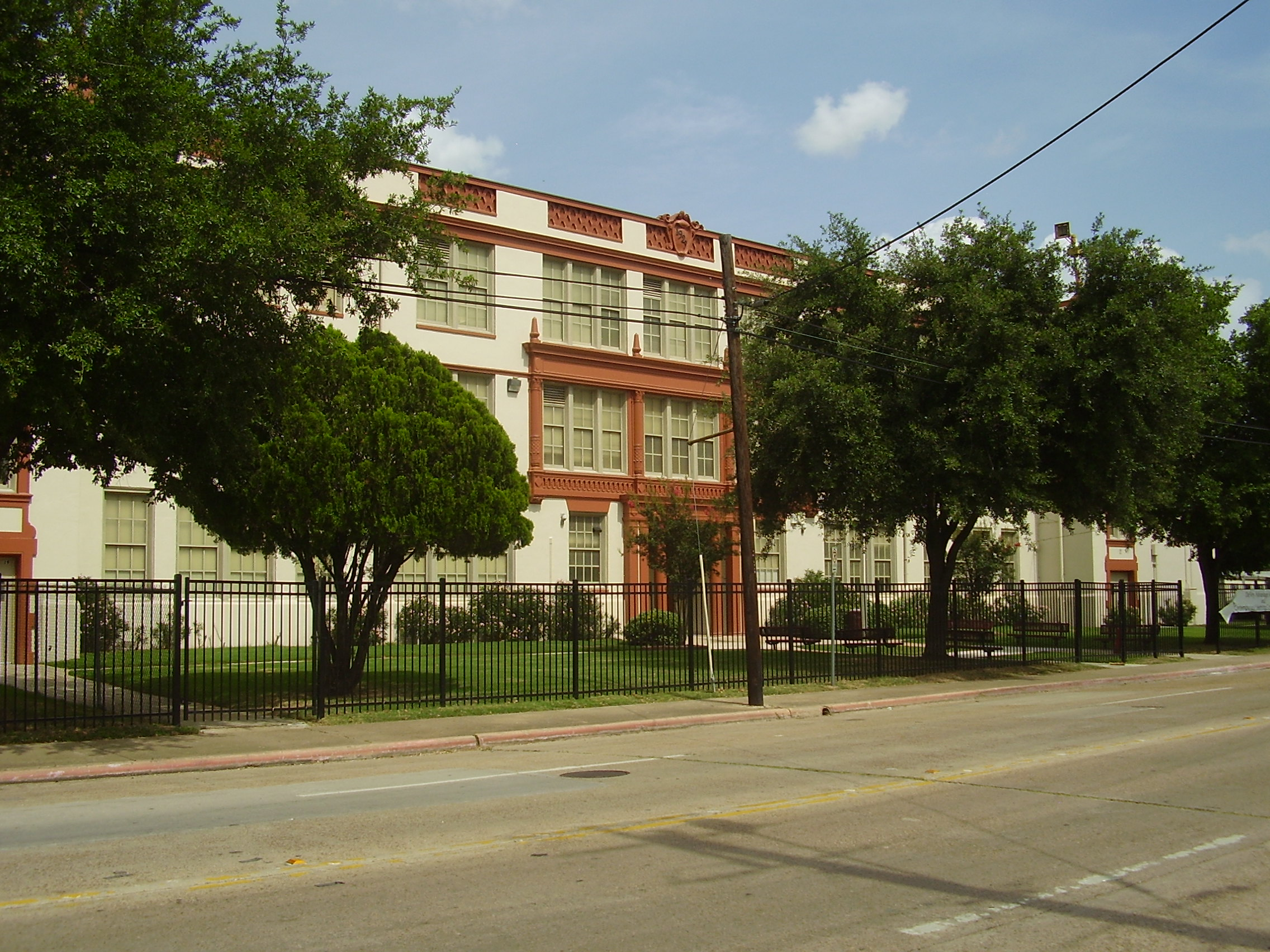
DeVry Advantage Academy

DeVry Advantage Academy and CLC at H.P. Carter was a high school in the Fifth Ward of Houston, Texas, operated in conjunction with DeVry University. It was in the former Carter Career Center/Wheatley High School/E.O. Smith Education Center building. The school offered students the opportunity to receive a high school diploma and a degree in web graphic design at the same time. It opened in 2011 and closed in 2012.

== History ==
It opened in 2011, replacing the Contemporary Learning Center. Houston Independent School District initially qualified for a $3 million grant to improve the CLC program, and the grant was to be distributed over a three-year period. CLC qualified for a grant intended to transform schools having problems, because CLC on repeated occasions did not meet federal academic standards. The district had spent $3 million to improve the former H.P. Carter Career Center building. The original plan was for DeVry University faculty to teach at the school. Nine teachers were Houston Independent School District DeVry teachers.

The school received fewer students than expected. Fewer than 50 students had enrolled. 11 participated in the DeVry program. Because of this, only one floor of the campus was occupied, and some extra laptop computers and technological items, which had been acquired with the grant funds, had never been removed from their boxes for student use. In addition, the Texas Education Agency lowered the grant money level to $1.6 million (about $2289940.83 when adjusted for inflation). Few of the 400 students who had previously attended CLC transferred to DeVry. Tracey Lewis, the principal of the DeVry school, said that the new location may have discouraged some of the earlier CLC students. Terry Grier, the Houston Independent School District superintendent, agreed with Lewis's hypothesis. Carol Mims Galloway, a former Houston Independent School District board member, said that the program was "set up for failure in the beginning." The students, instead of receiving DeVry instruction at school, were bussed to a DeVry facility about 20 miles (32 km) west of DeVry Advantage to receive their DeVry instruction.

In December 2011, the school announced that, due to the lower than expected enrollment, four of the Houston Independent School District DeVry teachers would have no classes in the northern hemisphere spring of 2012. Because they were under contract, they continued to report to school and receive payment from Houston Independent School District. One DeVry Houston Independent School District teacher took another job. In April 2012 the school board approved the school's closure. Because Houston Independent School District closed the school, it had to forfeit $529,000 (about $741857.52 when adjusted for inflation) in grant money. The district planned to make arrangements for students who were currently in the DeVry program to continue participating in it. Ericka Mellon of the Houston Chronicle said "Closure also would leave the future of the [Carter campus] uncertain."

== Uniforms ==
The school required students to wear school uniforms.
