= Wheatley High School (Houston) =

School in Houston, Texas, United States

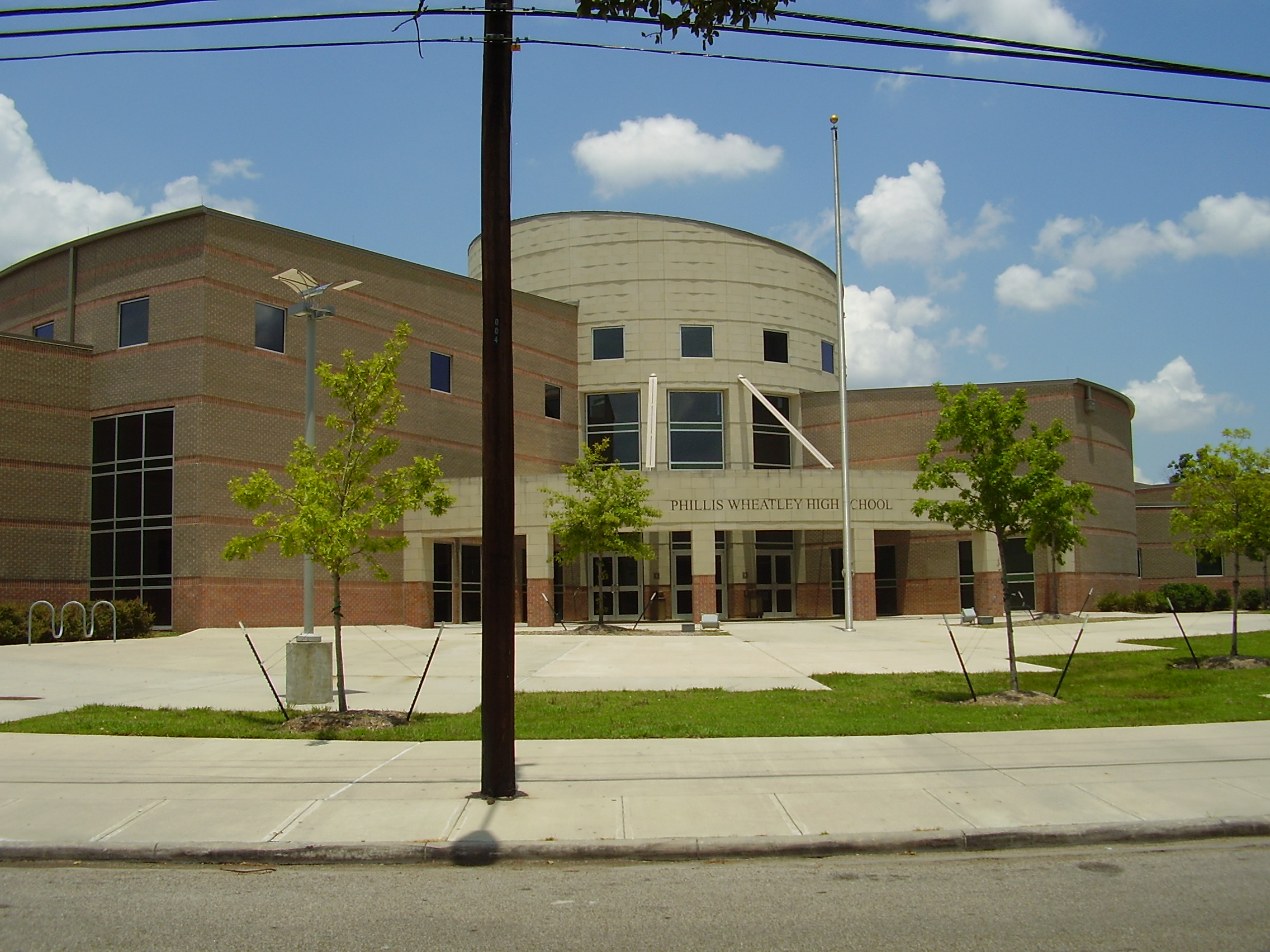
- Wheatley High School

Location
- 29.7713°N 95.31982°W

Information
- Opened: 1927
- School board: Houston Independent School District
- Teaching staff: 65.66 (FTE)
- Grades: 9-12
- Enrollment: 616 (2023-2024)
- Student to teacher ratio: 9.38
- Campus size: 14 acres (5.7 ha)
- Campus type: Urban
- Colors: Purple, black, and white
- Team name: Wildcats
- Website: wheatley.houstonisd.org

Phillis Wheatley High School is a secondary school located at 4801 Providence Street in Houston, Texas, United States with a ZIP code of 77020. Wheatley is a part of the Houston Independent School District. Wheatley, named after Phillis Wheatley, is located inside the 610 Loop in the Fifth Ward.

Wheatley has a technology magnet program inherited from the closure of Middle College for Technology Careers in spring 2006; Wheatley's program began in fall 2006.

In 1979, Wheatley principal Charles Herbert said that "For many, Fifth Ward is Wheatley High School" and that African-Americans who grew up in the Fifth Ward "still cling closely to Wheatley" even after they had moved to other parts of the United States.

== History ==
=== Pre-desegregation ===
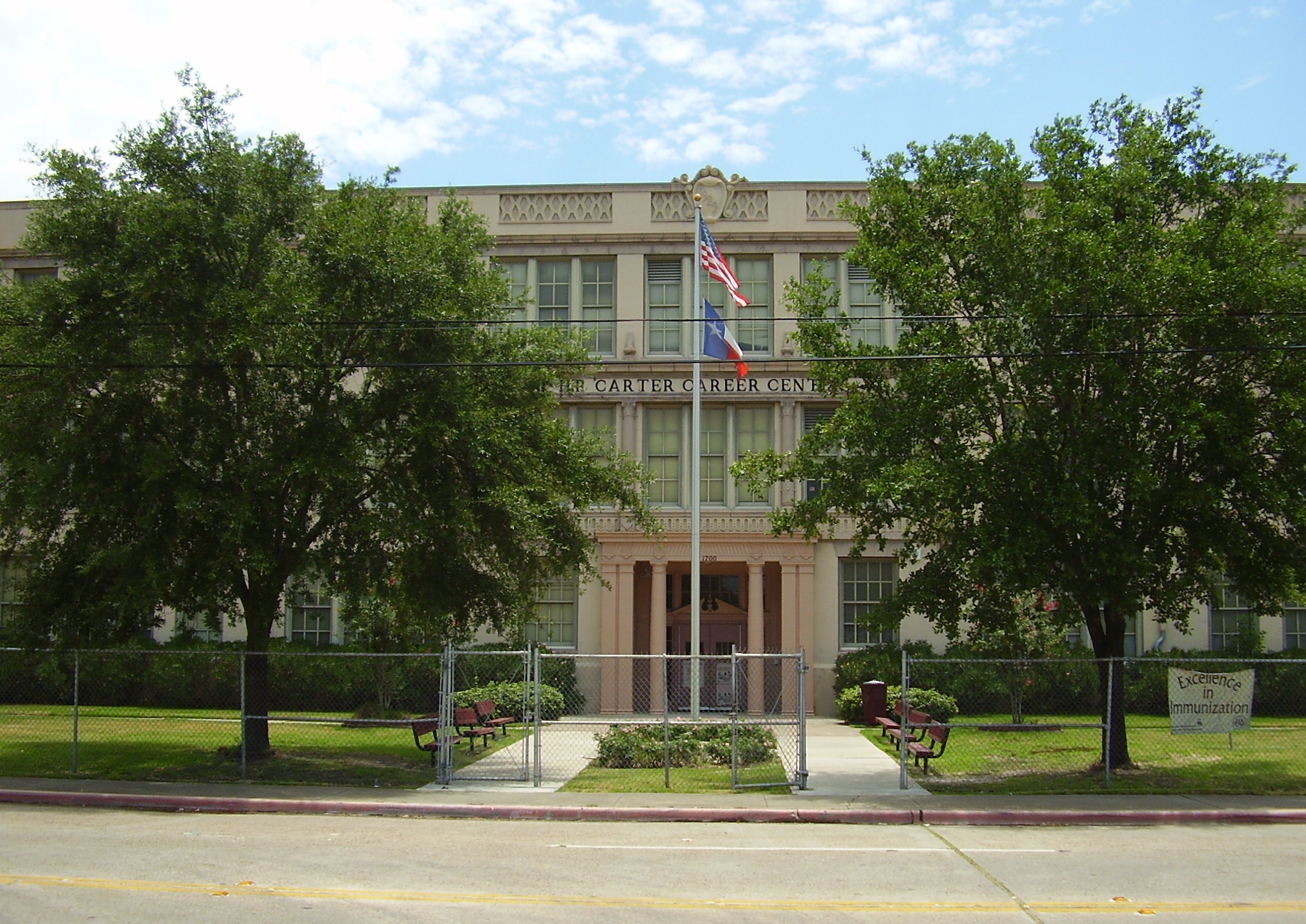
The Carter Career Center/DeVry Advantage Academy building, which formerly served as the Wheatley High School building

Wheatley first opened at 3415 Lyons Avenue in the former McGowan Elementary School building on January 31, 1927.

In 1927 Wheatley High School was one of the largest Black high schools in the United States with 2,600 students and 60 teachers, and it was such throughout the Jim Crow era, when schools were segregated on the basis of race. By 1949 Wheatley's first facility on Lyons Avenue became so overcrowded that students attended in shifts. During that year the 14-acre (5.7 ha), $2.5 million 4900 Market Street campus opened. The most expensive high school built in Houston at the time, the campus was designed by the firm MacKie & Kamrath in a Frank Lloyd Wright-influenced modernist style. The campus, described by the Houston Chronicle as "the finest Negro high school in the South," had a 1,500-seat auditorium, a gymnasium, an industrial arts facility, and a swimming pool. The school district spent attention on Wheatley in order to promote the argument that segregated minority schools can be equal to segregated White schools. The former Wheatley campus became E.O. Smith Middle School, and later the Carter Career Center.

In May 1965, William Lawson, a youth minister, asked some Wheatley students to discuss a proposed school boycott. While the school district was integrating, African American leaders believed that it was being integrated too slowly. During the boycott, which occurred five days later, 10% of Wheatley students attended classes.

=== Post-desegregation ===
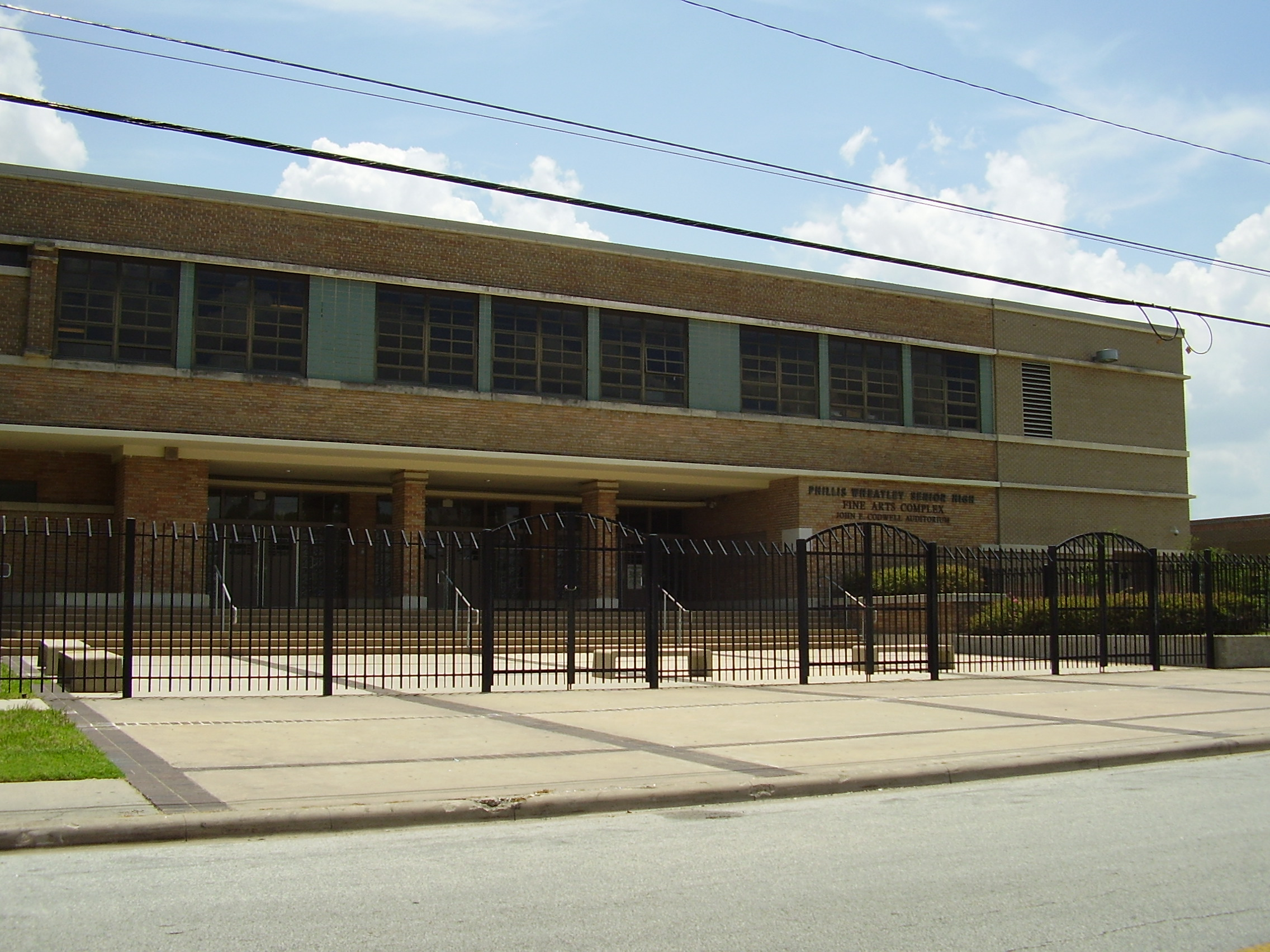
Fine Arts Complex and John F. Codwell Auditorium

In the 1970s Houston ISD had been desegregated. As the Fifth Ward as a neighborhood experienced a surge in crime, Houston ISD rezoned the Denver Harbor neighborhood, which had many White residents, to Wheatley. At that time the neighborhood was quickly becoming Hispanic. Many area Hispanic students preferred to attend Austin High School and Furr High School as they became the majority population at those schools. John Nova Lomax of the Houston Press stated that pride and discipline at Wheatley began to disintegrate in the 1970s, as counselors complained about a low level of morale among the students. The school abolished corporal punishment around that time, since White parents did not want Black teachers to physically punish white students, and Black parents did not want White teachers to physically punish black students. In addition, many of Wheatley's new White teachers, many of whom did not live in the Fifth Ward, had a lack of experience in teaching inner city Black students. Wylie Henry, a former HISD board member, said that many of the new White teachers "came in and tried to be kids' friends instead of their teachers." In 1979 Principal Herald stated that integration caused the best students and teachers to leave the school.

In 1976 the school was in the bottom twelfth percentile for reading; this meant that 88% of U.S. high school students had better reading scores than Wheatley students. In 1977 it declined to the bottom 11th. In 1978 HISD proposed using smaller classes, higher teaching salary, and a redesigned educational program to ameliorate Wheatley's academic problems. In 1979 Herald stated that test scores had declined.

That year Herald also stated that the situation at the school was more peaceful in the 1970s than during the Civil Rights Movement; he added that 50% of Wheatley students were attempting to gain admission in to university and that some gifted individuals still remained at the school.

In the mid-1980s, as crack cocaine became an epidemic in many inner-city neighborhoods, Wheatley students and teachers complained about security issues regarding some area apartments. In 1985 three youngsters walked onto the campus and shot an English teacher who had been conducting drill team rehearsals in the cafeteria. In 1986 a Hispanic student who had transferred from Dallas shot another Hispanic student in the face. After Joan Raymond became superintendent in 1986, she considered closing Wheatley because of difficulties in making the school have acceptable academic achievement and safety. Michael Berryhill of the Houston Press said that it was not politically possible to have the school closed since there were too many Wheatley alumni who did not want their school to be closed.

In the 1990s Wheatley had low test scores and high dropout rates. In 1995 Wheatley had the highest dropout rate and lowest mathematics score of the high schools in Houston ISD. In 1997 none of the teachers at Wheatley High School lived in the Wheatley attendance zone. During the same year, of the 1,800 high-school-age children zoned to Wheatley, less than 1,000 attended the school.

=== 2000s through 2020s ===
In 2007 a Johns Hopkins University study cited Wheatley as a "dropout factory" where at least 40% of the entering freshman class does not make it to their senior year.

A new campus for Wheatley High School, designed by Willie Jordan, a Wheatley alum, was under construction in the same plot of land as the first 4900 Market Street campus, although the address changed to 4801 Providence Street. The construction ended in fall 2006 and the new campus opened. The old 4900 Market Street campus was demolished. The new campus's original budget was $35,000,000. Construction began in summer 2004 and ended during summer 2006. The lead architect was ESPA Architecture, with the lead manager as Gilbane.

The population of the school increased when Middle College for Technology Careers merged into Wheatley.

Schools that received students zoned to Wheatley included Davis High School, Furr High School, Barbara Jordan High School, and Reagan High School. During that year 58% of children zoned to Kashmere chose to attend a different Houston ISD school.

The former Carter building later became DeVry Advantage Academy. HISD plans to build the permanent Mickey Leland College Preparatory Academy for Young Men on the site of the former Carter Career Center. The new building will look similar to the original one.

In 2019 the school received a failing ranking from the Texas Education Agency (TEA), the only HISD high school to receive that ranking that year. Around that period the TEA was attempting to replace the HISD school board, and it could possibly use Wheatley's failing grade as evidence that it should take this action. This was the seventh year in a row that the school had a failing grade. According to the TEA, any school which does not receive a passing grade in any of the four accountability categories, as Wheatley did, fails its overall accountability grade; this requirement came into effect in 2018. Wheatley officials stated that if the rule did not exist, Wheatley would have been ranked a "D". In November of that year, TEA Commissioner Mike Morath announced that the appeal for Wheatley was rejected; the basis of the appeal submitted was that student scores should be waived due to Hurricane Harvey, but other schools did not get the waiver for that reason for that year.

In 2023 the Wheatley school community was not certain whether, in the wake of the TEA taking control of HISD, the TEA would keep the school open.

In August 2026, a teacher at the school by the name of Darius Williams posted an emotional video which went viral on Instagram, tearfully detailing how seniors in his class were unable to read two paragraphs and formulate sentences. In reaction, state-appointed superintendent Mike Miles stated that "[They've] always had this," and that "Four years ago, it was worse. There were more 11th graders and 12th graders who could not read at grade level and do math at grade level." This came before Wheatley High School celebrated its first "A" accountability rating from the Texas Education Agency a few days later.

== Demographics ==
In the segregation era Wheatley had one of the highest enrollments of any American high schools reserved for black students as it had about 3,600 students.

In 1979 the school's student body had 1,197 blacks, 125 Hispanics, and 8 Whites.

Wheatley had one of the lowest enrollments of any zoned Houston ISD high school with 836 students during the 2004–2005 school year . In 2008, Wheatley had an enrollment of 1,235.

== Neighborhoods served by Wheatley ==
Neighborhoods zoned to Wheatley include the Fifth Ward (including Frenchtown), Denver Harbor, Liberty Heights, Barnes and Whetmore, St. Charles Square, Pecan Park Terrace, and a section of East Downtown. It also serves a portion of Kashmere Gardens.

Two Houston Housing Authority (HHA) public housing complexes, Clayton Homes and Kelly Village, are zoned to Wheatley. An HHA mixed-income housing complex, Kennedy Place, is zoned to Wheatley.

== Campus ==
The current $35 million Wheatley campus opened in June 2006. The architect of the campus, ESPA Group, won an award for "Outstanding Architecture and Design in Education" by School Planning & Management magazine for the Wheatley campus. The school appears in the June 2008 issue of School Planning & Management's Education Design Showcase.

In 2012 Richard Connelly of the Houston Press ranked Wheatley as the fifth most architecturally beautiful high school campus in Greater Houston. Connelly said that "High schools don't have to be classic to shine. The geometric playfulness of Wheatley gives it a distinctive look."

Wheatley is located in the Fifth Ward, in proximity to an Interstate 10 access road and a park.

In September 2014 the HISD school board approved the demolition of the 1929 Wheatley High School building. That year HISD began efforts to demolish the 1929 Wheatley High School but several lawsuits filed by October of that year prevented the district from entirely destroying the building. Three people, former and current residents of the Fifth Ward, had filed lawsuits in an attempt to prevent the demolition. Dan Hinde, a Texas state district judge, dismissed the lawsuits in December of that year. The district immediately proceeded with the demolition of the remainder of the structure. HISD plans to build a new school on that site.

== Athletics ==
In 1997 Michael Berryhill of the Houston Press wrote that in the pre-desegregation era Wheatley "dominated black high school basketball in Texas" but it was not a "consistent power" in American football.

=== Basketball ===
The school won many trophies from the state basketball tournament, which was held at Prairie View A&M University.

In a 25-year period ending in 1974, 15 of its teams made the state championships. Originally Wheatley played in the Negro leagues, but around 1968 the University Interscholastic League (UIL) opened its membership to black schools. In 1968 the State of Texas held the first high school basketball playoffs. Then, the Wheatley team defeated the Thomas Jefferson High School team of Dallas, Texas by 85–80 in overtime. Through the win, Wheatley had achieved a 36–0 record. In from 1968 to 1974, Wheatley received four state championship crowns, won 219 games, and lost 11 games.

Historically many star basketball players moved on to Prairie View A&M University and Texas Southern University. By 1974 other, more prominent universities were considering recruiting Wheatley players.

Berryhill said that basketball wins continued "periodically" after desegregation.

=== Football ===
In the segregation era schools for blacks played their games on weekdays while schools for whites played their games on Fridays.

Historically the American football game between Wheatley and Yates High School was among the most prominent ones in the United States. In the segregation era Wheatley did not play games against white high schools. Beginning in 1927, each Thanksgiving Day the school's American football team played Yates High School's football team at the Jeppeson Stadium. The Yates-Wheatley Thanksgiving football match, described by On American Soil: How Justice Became a Casualty of World War II author Jack Hamann as "the most important noncollege football game in the country", often had crowds that had over 30,000 people. The rivalry declined after Yates joined the UIL, and after the football leagues integrated the Thanksgiving Day Yates-Wheatley game ended.

== Music ==
Percy McDavid, one of the few American music teachers in the 1930s who taught both classical music and jazz in orchestra courses, developed Wheatley's musical programs in that decade. Duke Ellington made a 1935 visit to hear Wheatley's orchestra. Various famed musicians graduated from Wheatley in that time period, including Arnett Cobb and Illinois Jacquet. While operating this program McDavid received help from his brother, Russell McDavid.

== Notable alumni ==
- Tom Archia, Jazz Tenor Saxophonist,
- Archie Bell, musician
- Arnett Cobb, musician
- Donnie Davis, former professional American football player
- Harold Dutton Jr., Texas State Representative of District 142
- Albert "Al" Edwards, Texas State Representative of District 146
- Dr. Marion Ford, dentist and Guggenheim fellow
- George Foreman, boxing champion
- Everett Gay, former NFL player
- Lester Hayes, former NFL player for the Oakland Raiders
- Clarence Hollimon, guitarist
- Xavien Howard, American football cornerback
- William Jackson III, American football cornerback
- Illinois Jacquet, jazz musician
- Cliff Johnson, retired MLB player
- Dwight Elmo Jones, basketball player drafted by the Atlanta Hawks
- Barbara Jordan, first African-American U.S. Congresswoman from the Southern United States.
- Mickey Leland, member of the Texas House of Representatives until his death.
- Kanavis McGhee, former professional American football player
- Ruth Jones McClendon, Texas State Representative of District 120
- Grady Richardson, former NFL player
- Ruth Simmons, president of Brown University
- Joe Sample, member of The Crusaders
- Eldridge Small, former professional football player
- Fred Taylor, retired NBA player
- Godwin Turk, professional football player
- Hubert Laws, flautist and member of The Crusaders
- Sid Williams, former NFL player and United States Ambassador to the Bahamas
- Willie Williams, football player
- Jim Young, NFL player

== Feeder patterns ==
Elementary schools that feed into Wheatley include:

- Dogan
- Eliot
- N.Q. Henderson
- R. Martinez
- Pugh
- Scroggins
- Bruce (partial)
- Burnet (partial)
- Isaacs (partial)
- Lantrip (partial)
- Ross (partial)
- Scott (partial)

Middle schools that feed into Wheatley include:

- McReynolds
- Fleming (partial)
- Yolanda Black Navarro (formerly Stonewall Jackson) (partial)

== See also ==
- History of the African-Americans in Houston
