= Contemporary Learning Center =

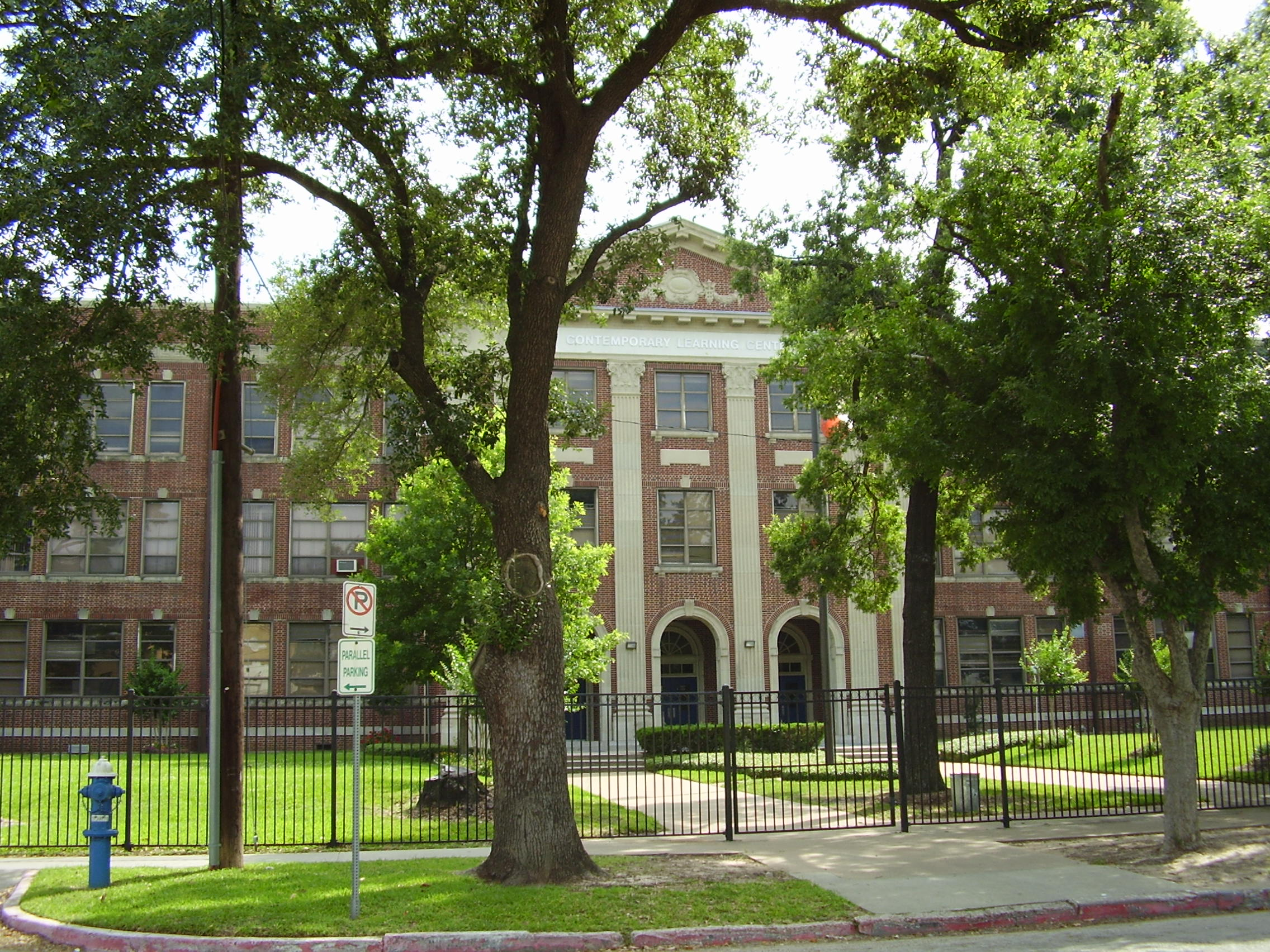

Location
- Houston; Texas
- 29.7312°N 95.3741°W

Information
- Type: Alternative secondary school
- Website: web.archive.org/*/http://www.hisd-clc.org/

Contemporary Learning Center (CLC) was a secondary school located in Houston, Texas, United States. CLC closed in 2011. It was replaced by DeVry Advantage Academy, operated in association with DeVry University.

CLC, which serves grades 7 through 12, is a part of the Houston Independent School District.

CLC was located in the Third Ward area, near Midtown.

CLC served students who did not succeed in traditional school environments and need more academic motivation and better attendance records.

CLC included Houston Night High School, Houston ISD's evening high school program. The school, which served grades 9–12, opened in 1975 and closed in the summer of 2007.

== History ==
The building that housed CLC was constructed in 1925. The building originally was Johnston Junior High School. When Johnston moved to Meyerland in September 1959, Miller Junior High School opened in Johnston's former location. CLC began in 1973 as the Continuous Progress Learning and Development Center, a high school program for students who did not perform well in traditional academic environments. It was a pilot project of the Emergency School Aid Act (ESAA). It originally used two rooms at Miller before several temporary buildings were moved to the school. The CLC high school stayed in the temporary buildings until 1976. When the high school vacated the temporary buildings, the CLC middle school moved into the temporary buildings. In 1980 the middle school moved to the third floor.

In 2006, the district suspended six female students after a fight occurred. CLC closed in 2011.

During its final year of operation, about 400 students attended CLC. In March 2011, the HISD board granted the district approval to move CLC to a new building, 5 miles (8.0 km) from the old location. The school qualified for a grant intended to transform schools having problems, because CLC on repeated occasions did not meet federal academic standards. CLC was converted into the DeVry Advantage Academy. Few students from CLC transferred to DeVry. Tracey Lewis, the principal of the DeVry school, said that the new location may have discouraged some of the earlier CLC students. Terry Grier, the HISD superintendent, agreed with Lewis's hypothesis. In the northern hemisphere fall of that year, the Young Women's College Preparatory Academy opened on the previous CLC site.

== Student body ==
During the 2004–2005 school year, 691 students were enrolled at CLC

- 67% African American
- 31% Hispanic American
- 1% White American
- 1% Asian American

No Native Americans were enrolled during that school year.

About 80% of students qualified for free or reduced lunch.

== School uniforms ==
CLC requires school uniforms.

== Notable alumni ==
- Juan Díaz - boxer
