= Young Women's College Preparatory Academy =

Girl's secondary school in Houston, Texas, U.S.

Coordinates: 29.7312°N 95.3741°W

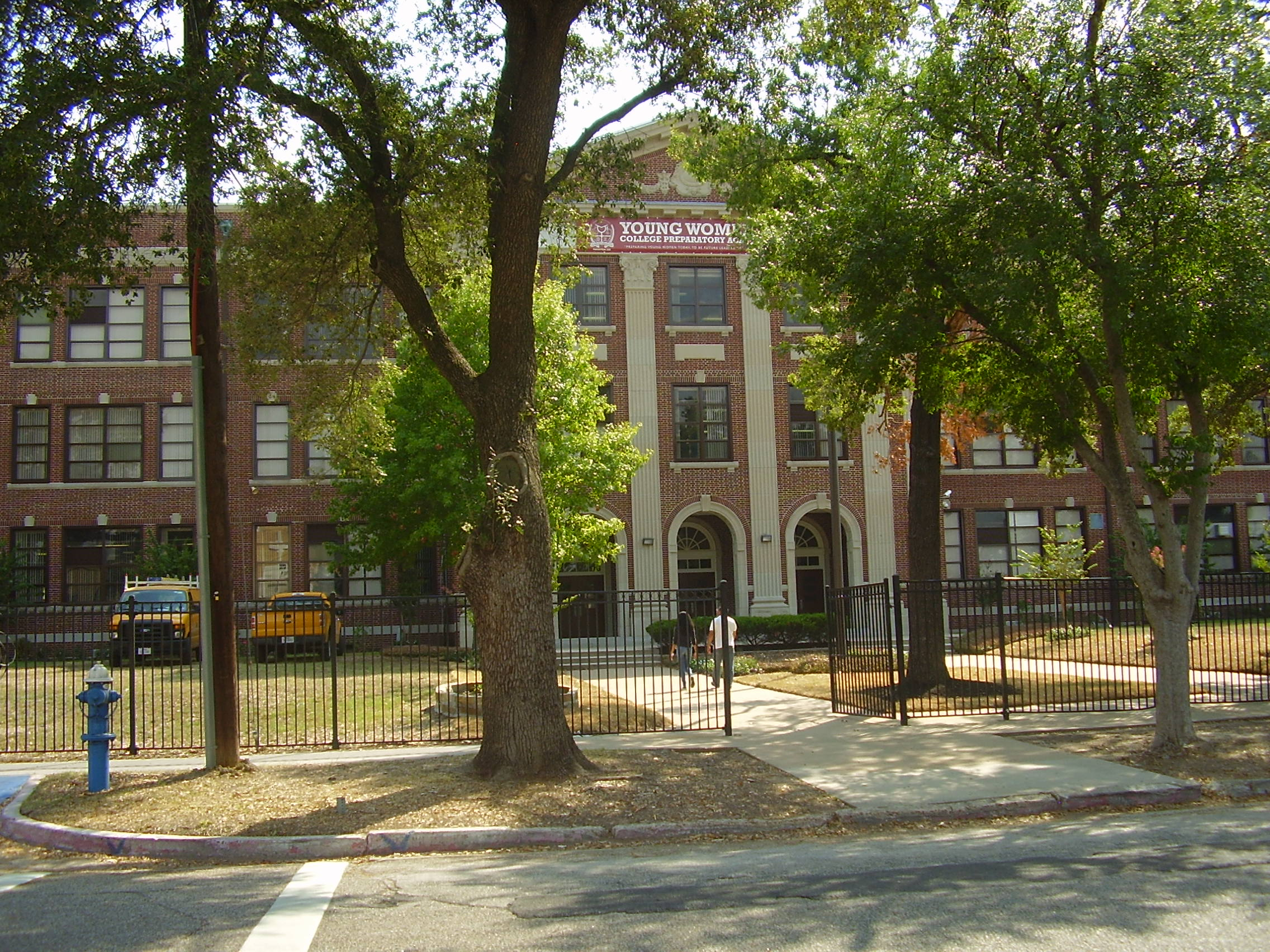
Young Women's College Preparatory Academy

Young Women's College Preparatory Academy (YWCPA) is a secondary (middle and high) school for girls in Houston, Texas that is a part of the Houston Independent School District. It opened in 2011 in the former Contemporary Learning Center (CLC) building.

The school is located in the Third Ward area. The Foundation for the Education of Young Women and HISD partnered in order to develop the school. The foundation committed $1 million to start the school. The plan initially called for the school to be housed at CLC, but the agenda items, including the plan, were tabled until December 2010.

== Curriculum ==
By 2023, YWCPA began an Advanced Placement African-American History course.

== See also ==
- Young Men's College Preparatory Academy
- Women's education in the United States
