= St. Thomas High School (Houston) =

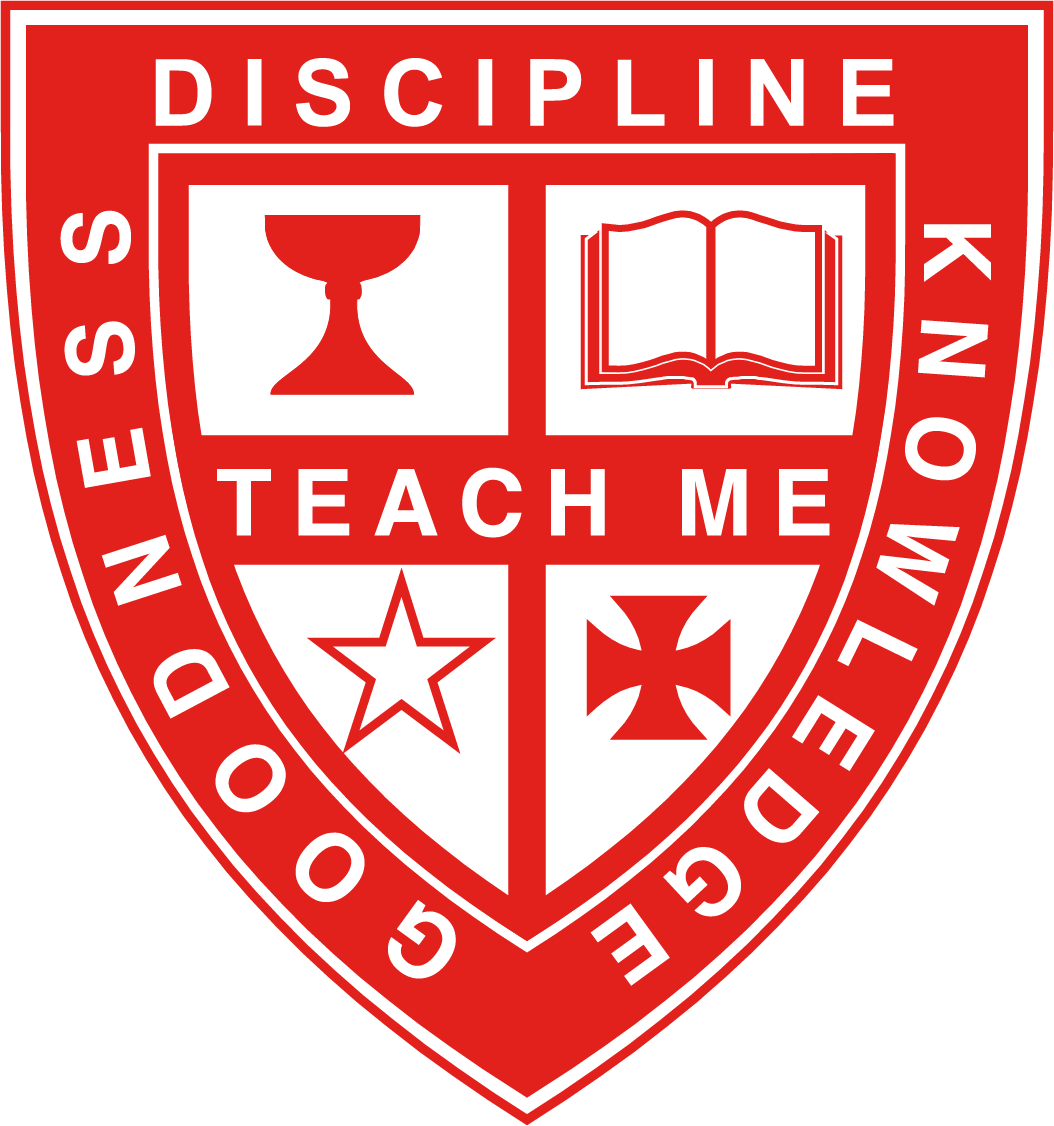

Location
- 4500 Memorial Drive; Houston, Texas 77007; United States; 29°45′44″N 95°24′29″W

Information
- Type: Private boys secondary school
- Motto: Teach me Goodness, Discipline and Knowledge
- Denomination: Roman Catholic
- Patron saint: St. Thomas Aquinas
- Founded: 1900
- President: Fr. James Murphy, CSB
- Principal: Dr. Aaron Dominguez
- Grades: 9–12
- Campus: Urban
- Colors: Red and White
- Song: St. Thomas Alma Mater
- Fight song: Eagle Fight Song
- Athletics conference: TAPPS 6A
- Mascot: Tom Eagle
- Nickname: Eagles
- Rivals: Strake Jesuit, St. Pius X
- Accreditation: Southern Association of Colleges and Schools
- Newspaper: The Eagle
- Yearbook: Aquin
- Tuition: $26,850
- Affiliation: Basilian Fathers
- Website: www.sths.org
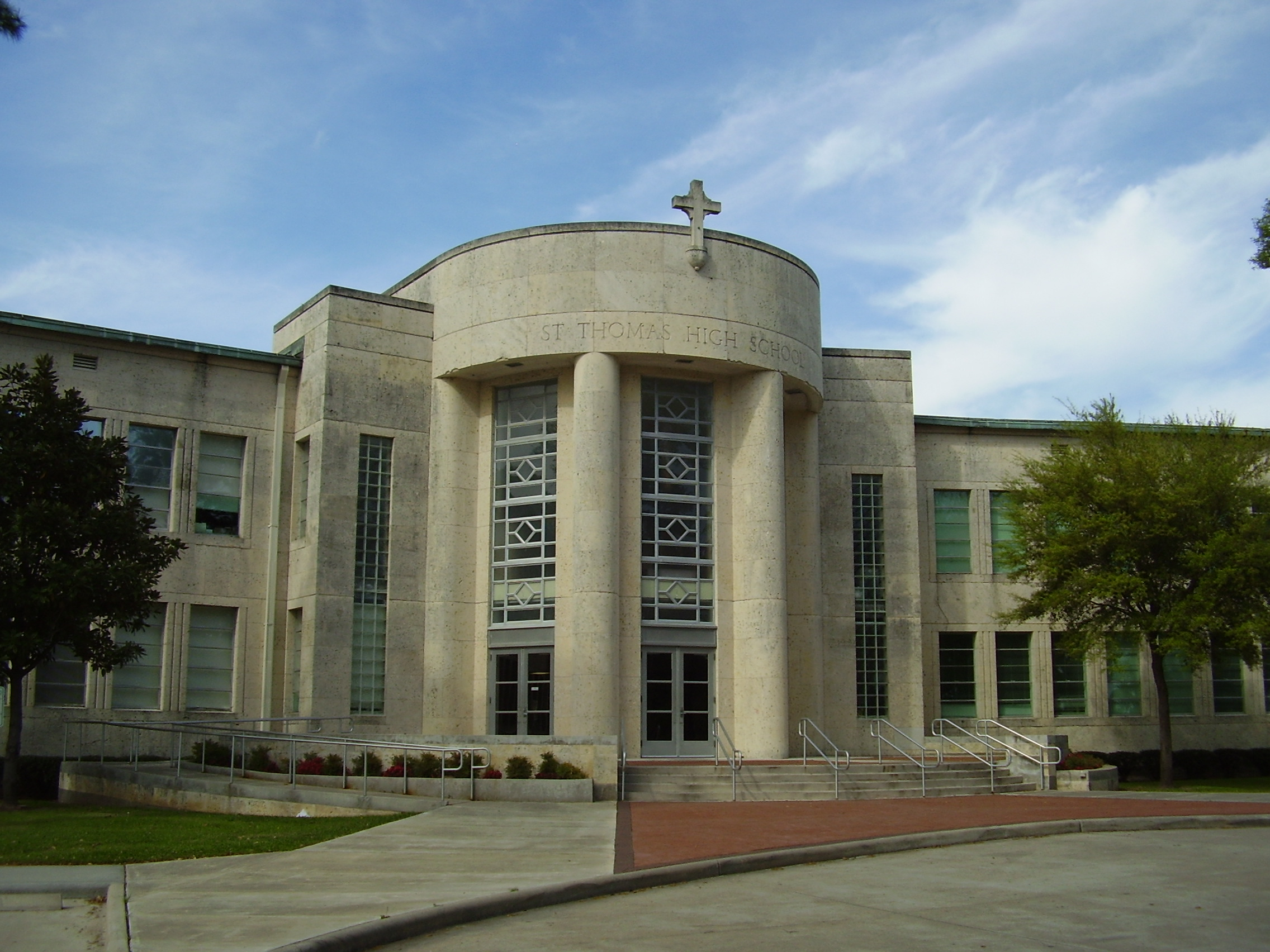
- Entrance to St. Thomas High School

St. Thomas High School is an all-boys, Catholic college preparatory school in Houston, Texas. Founded in 1900, St. Thomas is the second oldest continuously operating private high school in Houston behind Incarnate Word Academy, which was founded in 1873. The school is operated by the Basilian Fathers in the Archdiocese of Galveston-Houston.

== History ==
St. Thomas High School was established in 1900 as St. Thomas College and housed that year at Franklin Avenue and Caroline Street. The founders were the Rev. Nicholas Roche, C.S.B. and two other Basilian Fathers. When the original school suffered hurricane damage, the Fathers relocated to Capitol and Main. In 1903, permanency was assured when Father Roche bought a block of land at Austin and Hadley and constructed Houston's first College Preparatory School for boys. Thanks to the foresight of a native Texan, The Rev. T.P. O'Rourke, C.S.B., educator and author, St. Thomas High School in 1940 moved to the current site on the bank of Buffalo Bayou. The college section later became the University of St. Thomas. Father A.L. Higgins directed the building of the new facility, which has expanded in later years. During Houston's 20th century growth into a focus of world culture, St. Thomas High School has trained men of vision and responsibility, winners of national and international fame; statesmen, churchmen, artists, historians, athletes, civic and business leaders, industrial pioneers, and citizens of many talents.

The school was named after St. Thomas Aquinas, the patron saint of students and education. St. Thomas has occupied its current (as of 2023) site since 1940. The school's location in central Houston on the north bank of the Buffalo Bayou at Memorial and Shepherd which places it 3 miles from Downtown Houston. The campus is self-contained with a fine arts center, computer lab, library, competition gymnasium, baseball field, chapel, and stadium, most housed in distinguished Texas Cordova Shell Stone buildings.

By the 2010s St. Thomas sought to expand but lacked land needed to build more buildings. As of July 2013 St. Thomas High School and the investment group AV Dickson Street were engaged in a dispute over the acquisition of the High School for Law Enforcement and Criminal Justice (HSLECJ) property of the Houston Independent School District (HISD). On Thursday July 18, 2013 the HISD board rejected both requests. David Thompson, the HISD board attorney, stated that both bidders violated the district's code of silence policy. In November of that year HISD sold the former HSLECJ to St. Thomas. HISD received $60 million from St. Thomas.

At the time of sale HISD was still using the HSLECJ campus and St. Thomas had to wait until the new campus for HSLECJ opened before repurposing it. HSLECJ, later renamed to High School for Law and Justice, moved to its new campus in 2018. The HSLECJ was named the Joplin Campus, and select portions were opened in 2020. The dedication was held November 2020.

== Location ==
St. Thomas High School is situated west of Downtown Houston on the wooded banks of Buffalo Bayou at the corner of Memorial Drive and Shepherd.

== Feeder schools ==
A majority of students at St. Thomas come from various private, Catholic, and parochial grade schools such as St. Elizabeth Ann Seton, St. Anne (Houston), St. Michael's, St. Cecilia's, St. Rose of Lima, St. Theresa, and The Regis School of the Sacred Heart within the Archdiocese of Galveston–Houston, but a significant part of the student body comes from other area Christian schools. Students from public middle schools also often choose to apply for admission for their freshman year.

== Transportation ==
As of 2019, the school has four bus routes: Pearland, Christ the Redeemer Catholic School in Cypress, St. Martha Catholic School in Kingwood, and St. Edward Catholic School in the Spring area.

== Campus ==
In 2012 Richard Connelly of the Houston Press ranked St. Thomas as the third most architecturally beautiful high school campus in Greater Houston. Connelly said that "An appropriately churchy feel to the entrance relieves the somewhat banal industrial feel of the wings."

The Joplin Campus includes strength/conditioning and sports medicine facilities as well as 20,000 square feet (1,900 m^{2}) locker rooms for basketball and wrestling teams. The weight training room was previously a cafeteria. The auditorium at Joplin has a capacity of 630. St. Thomas also built a new baseball field summer of 2023 (Fr. Wilson Field).

== Student body ==
In 2013 there were 745 students, with 63% being non-Hispanic White, 21% being Hispanic or Latino, 7% being African-American, 6% being Asian, and 3% being multiracial. In 2013 students came from over 130 ZIP codes. The school administration stated that this is because St. Thomas is in the center of the Houston metropolitan area. In 2013 it had 105 full-time employees.

== Notable alumni ==
- Bill Archer, U.S. congressman (1971-2001)
- Corky Ballas, retired competitive ballroom dancer who holds several Latin dance championship titles
- Cavan Biggio, baseball player
- John Bradshaw, author, educator, and motivational speaker
- Jack Burke Jr., professional golfer; winner of 1956 Masters and 1956 PGA Championship
- Oscar Cantú, Catholic prelate
- George Edward Cire, U.S. federal judge
- Dan Cook, sports journalist.
- William H. Goetzmann, Yale University professor and winner of 1967 Pulitzer Prize for History
- L. Patrick Gray, former director of the Federal Bureau of Investigation
- Henry Grover, Republican gubernatorial nominee in 1972.
- Steven Hotze, physician and far-right activist
- Joe Jamail, trial lawyer.
- Dave Marr, professional golfer and broadcaster; winner of 1965 PGA Championship.
- David Herbert McNerney, Medal of Honor recipient.
- William Michael Mulvey, current bishop of Corpus Christi since his episcopal ordination in 2010.
- Vincent M. Rizzotto, Auxiliary Bishop Emeritus of the Roman Catholic Diocese of Galveston-Houston.
- George Strake, Jr., Secretary of State of Texas (1979–81); Republican state chairman, 1983–88; Houston businessman and philanthropist.
- Steve Tyrell, Grammy Award-winning musician and producer
- Ian Wheeler (born 2001), professional football player
- Josh Wolf (born 2000), baseball player in the Cleveland Indians organization and for Team Israel
- Grant Delpit, professional football player (attended but transferred)

== Athletics ==
St. Thomas originally competed in the now defunct T.C.I.L. (Texas Christian Interscholastic League) That league began in 1935 under the direction of Rev. Albert Mitchell (principal of Central Catholic, San Antonio) St. Thomas' last year of competition in the T.C.I.L. concluded when the league came to a close in the 1999-2000 athletic season. The Eagles are proud owners of numerous District, Regional and State Championships in various sports that date back from over the past 100 years, as well as several within the past five years in their current league. The athletic department provides 12 different programs which are: Baseball, Basketball, Cross-Country, Football, Golf, Lacrosse, Rugby, Soccer, Swimming, Tennis, Track & Field, and Wrestling.

Currently, St. Thomas competes in the Texas Association of Private and Parochial Schools (TAPPS). The Eagles have prospered well in its league with numerous district and state championships. The most recent state championship came in 2023 with the cross-country team winning the state title.

In May 2008 the school hired Craig Biggio, the former Houston Astros second baseman and Hall of Famer, as head baseball coach. Biggio remained the head coach until he stepped down at the conclusion of the 2012–2013 school year.

== See also ==
- Christianity in Houston
