= Kay On-Going Education Center =

Former school in Houston, Texas, U.S.

Coordinates: 29.83052°N 95.32189°W

Kay On-Going Education Center was a middle and high school in Houston, Texas. It was a program of the Houston Independent School District for pregnant girls. It had a campus on North Shepherd Drive. Pregnant HISD students were permitted to attend Kay On-Going, but they were not required to. Students received on-campus prenatal care. In addition to the nursing care, the school also provided counseling to ensure that the girls remained enrolled in school.

== History ==
Kay On-Going opened in 1975. It was housed in the former Kay Elementary School. It was named after Savannah Georgia Kay, who once served as principal of Harrisburg Elementary School, which became Kay Elementary.

During the 1984-1985 school year, 15% of the grades in the fall semester were Fs. At most HISD campuses, the percentages of Fs decreased in the spring semester because of the state-implemented No Pass No Play rule, which requires students in high school athletic programs to attain passing grades. Kay On-Going was the only HISD campus to have the percentage of its F grades increase for the spring semester; the new percentage of Fs was 25 percent. Kay On-Going and Night High School had the highest percentages of Fs that were recorded due to excessive absences.

In 1988 a report by the Carnegie Foundation for the Advancement of Teaching expressed a favorable assessment of Kay On-Going. In the 1988-1989 school year, girls gave birth to 70 babies. Annual HISD district reports stated from 1980 to 1989, the number of pregnant girls within the school district fluctuated between 443 and 581. In 1989 district officials told the Houston Chronicle that the reports did not reflect the true pregnancy rate among HISD students. In 1989 Kay On-Going had 158 students.

Around 1996, while HISD police officers were assigned to all other HISD middle and high schools, no officers were assigned to Kay On-Going.

Funds from the 2002 HISD Bond were used to give the campus a $1 million renovation, which included renovated restrooms, a new roof, and additional repairs, to the Kay On-Going building. The renovation was completed shortly before June 2006. In 2006 it had 160 students.

In the 2005-2006 school year HISD was required to provide free tutoring to low income students at Kay On-Going because, for three consecutive years, Kay On-Going did not meet state academic targets, which were set by the No Child Left Behind federal act. During the school year, 2,912 students at Kay On-Going, Lee High School, and Marshall Middle School qualified for the tutoring. The tutoring, which covered the Texas Assessment of Knowledge and Skills (TAKS), began on February 4, 2006. On the three campuses, 74 students, 3% of the eligible students, enrolled in the tutoring program. Mercedes Alejandro of the group Parents for Public Schools accused HISD of not effectively communicating that the tutoring was available to the communities at the schools.

=== Closure ===
In March 2006 the HISD board announced that it planned to close Kay On-Going. At that point the district had not decided whether the pregnant students program would stay at one campus or be divided among multiple campuses. At one point the HISD board considered moving the school to an unused area within DeBakey High School. The school had around 30 unused classrooms, and HISD administrators argued that the Texas Medical Center location would be of use to pregnant students. Jennifer Radcliffe of the Houston Chronicle said that the proposed plan yielded a "mixed" reaction in DeBakey parents and students. Some signed a petition asking the district not to merge Kay On-Going into DeBakey.

Ultimately HISD did not go forward with the plan. Instead it moved into Kay On-Going into the Carter Career Center in the Fifth Ward. The district also stopped considering Kay On-Going a separate institution; instead test scores of the girls were included with their zoned schools. The change would mean HISD would be no longer required to uphold the free tutoring requirement. The chief of staff for the Houston Federation of Teachers, Helen Wheatley, criticized the decision to dissolve Kay On-Going. Harper Alternative School was scheduled to move into the vacated Kay On-Going school.
