= CECHS =

CECHS may refer to:

- Challenge Early College High School - Houston, Texas
- Coahoma Early College High School - Coahoma County, Mississippi
