= Sterling High School (Houston) =

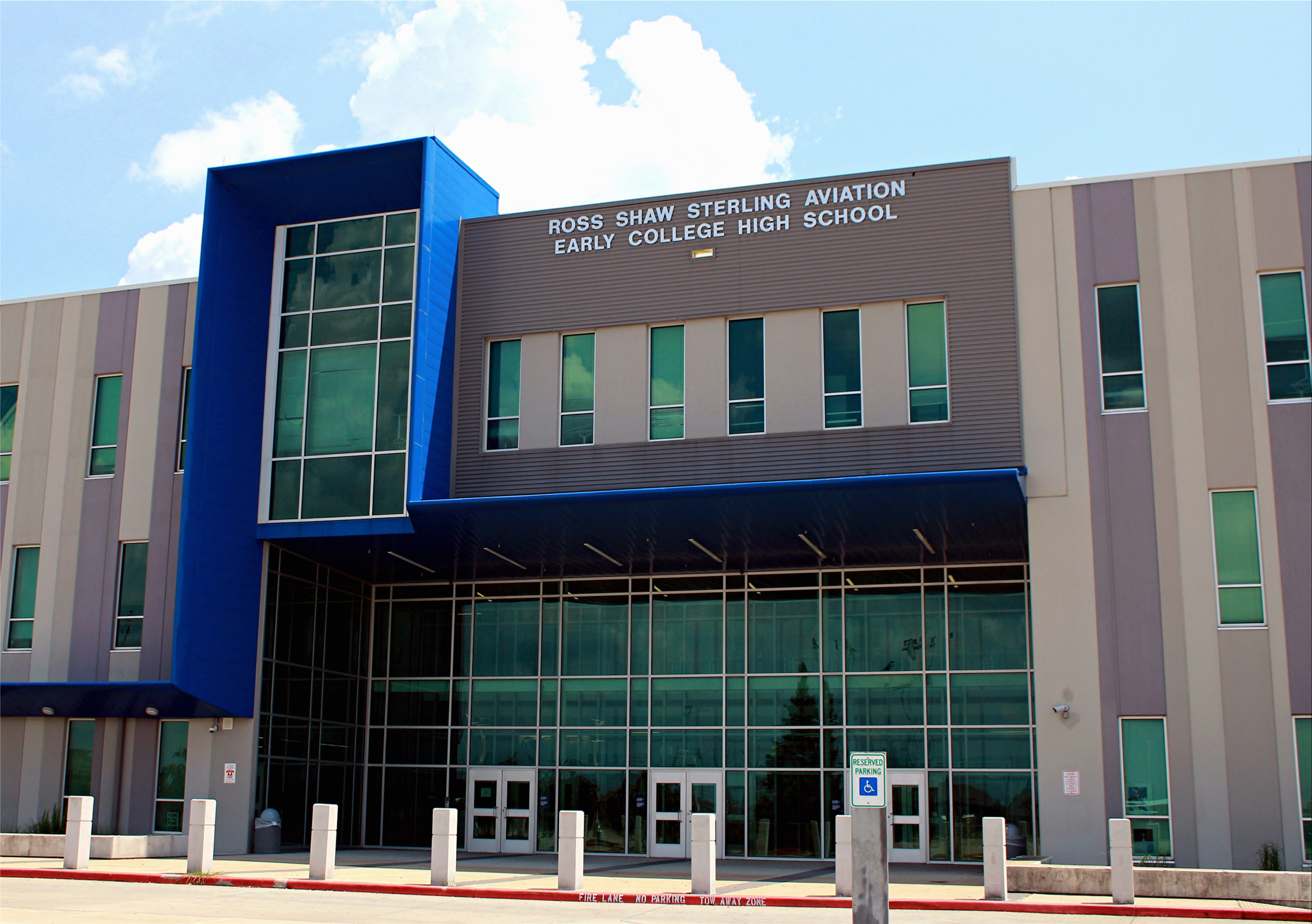
- Sterling High School in 2020

Location
- 11625 Martindale Road; Houston, Texas 77048; United States; 29.636255°N 95.322758°W

Information
- Type: Public high school
- Established: 1965
- Principal: Sabrina Cuby-King
- Teaching staff: 104.53 (FTE)
- Grades: 9-12
- Enrollment: 1,341 (2023-2024)
- Student to teacher ratio: 12.83
- Colors: Blue and white
- Team name: Raiders
- Feeder schools: Cornelius Elementary School; Others listed below
- Website: Official Website

Ross Shaw Sterling High School, also known as Sterling Aviation High School, is a secondary school located in Houston, Texas. Sterling, which serves grades 9 through 12, is a part of the Houston Independent School District. The school was named after Ross S. Sterling. Sterling has Houston ISD's magnet program for Aviation Sciences.

== History ==
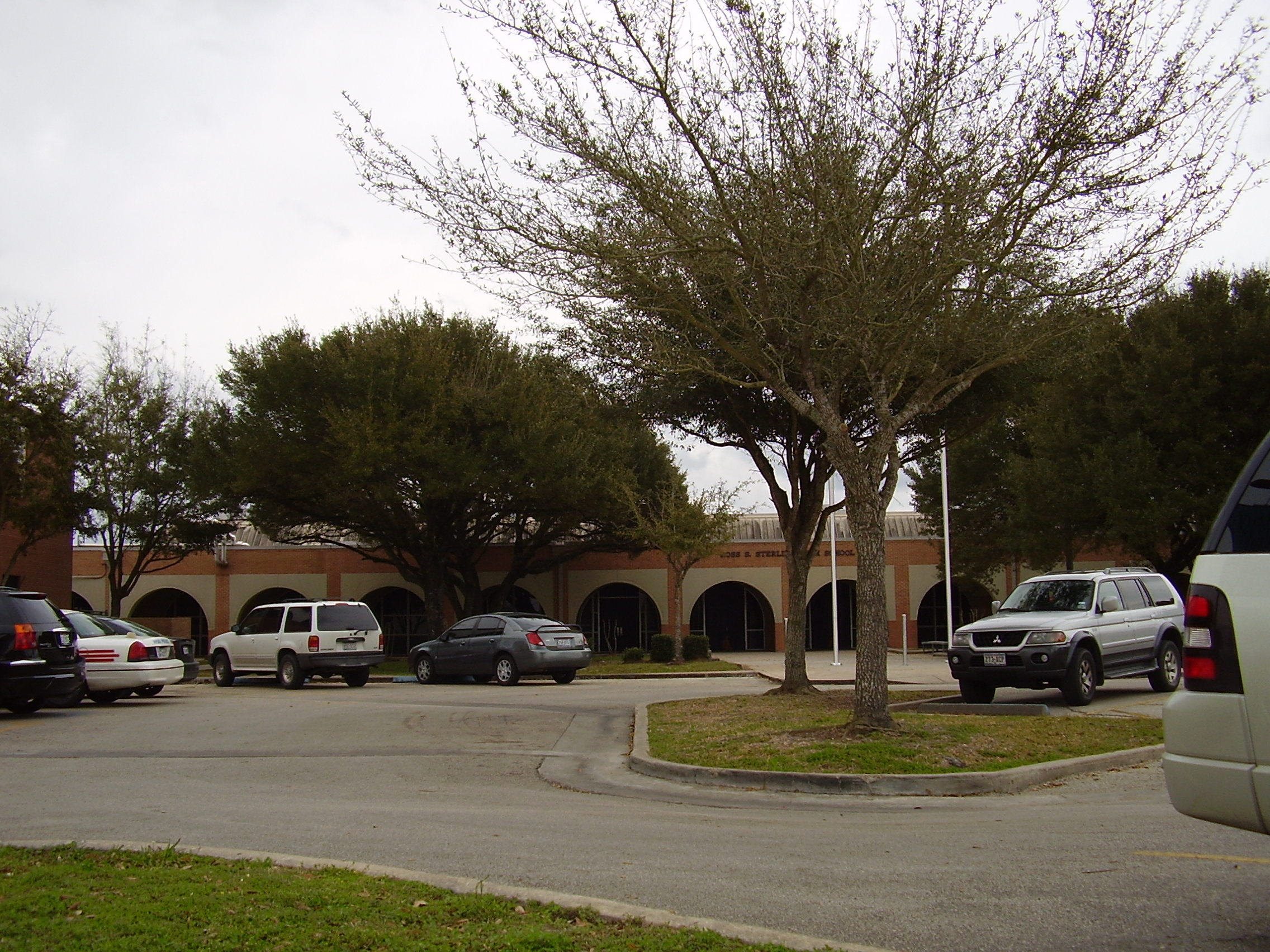
Sterling High School in 2008

Ross S. Sterling High School opened as a junior/senior high school (grades 7–12) in the fall of 1965.

This unique, three-building campus featured designed-in air-conditioning which was a new, yet essential, feature for HISD facilities. The Sterling campus had a mirror twin sister campus, James Madison Jr./Senior High School, that opened at the same time as Sterling.

The first principal of Sterling was A.P. (Pete) Dowling, an experienced educator and administrator with HISD.

During the 1967 school year, local radio station KILT staged an enormous promotion contest between area high schools. The contest was simple: Each school had to submit as many individual paper entries as possible with the name of the high school on each sheet. The winning school would be the one that submitted the most pounds of paper. The contest created a lot of non-value added time in many classrooms as reams of copy paper and thousands of boxes of computer punch cards were submitted. Ross Sterling was the winner. The primary prize for winning was a school dance sponsored by KILT featuring a regional band named Southwest F.O.B.

Sterling became a senior high school (grades 10–12) exclusively with the 1968–1969 school year. The Blue Raider football team made its first playoff appearance during the 1970 season when it emerged as district champion. The Raiders then defeated Robert E. Lee in bid-district play but were then victims to the Sam Houston High juggernaut in the area round of the playoffs.

Sterling's Naval Junior Reserve Officer Training Corps (NJROTC) Detachment was first established on-campus in May 1970. Graduating NJROTC Cadets incur no military service obligation, however many have chosen to serve in every branch of the United States Armed Forces.

During the 1984-1985 school year, the percentages of Fs at 23 of 26 HISD high school campuses decreased in the spring semester because of the state-implemented No Pass No Play rule, which requires students in high school athletic programs to attain passing grades. At Sterling and Barbara Jordan High School for Careers, the percentages of Fs remained the same.

Linda Turner, the president of the Sterling High School PTO, stated that HISD promised to revamp Sterling after the 1998 and the 2007 bond elections passed, but that nothing improved. Her group accused the school of misleading the people by stating that Sterling and Jones High School would both receive new school campuses. After the 2012 bond, the district began indicating that Jones would be consolidated into Sterling.

As of 2010 about half of the HISD students zoned to Sterling did not attend that school.

In 2011 the Class of 1971 was to celebrate its 40th anniversary.

A 2011 report from Magnet Schools of America had recommended closing the Sterling aviation magnet, saying there was a lack of interest. In response, several graduates of the program told HISD that the program was beneficial.

In January 2012 E. Dale Mitchell, who previously served as the principal of Hutto Middle School in Hutto, Texas and worked in the Stafford Municipal School District, became the principal of Sterling.

Houston Airport System established an aviation club at Sterling and Carnegie Vanguard High School in the fall of 2012.

As of 2013, the school had 900 students, and 1,100 HISD students living in the school's attendance zone opted not to attend Sterling. The school had its third principal in a five-year period. Mitchell stated that there were 61-66 students combined who transferred to Sterling to attend the aviation program or the Futures Academy. Margaret Downing of the Houston Press argued that the figure was not "an impressive number".

Downing wrote that "Whoever erected it, there's a rather sizable wall of distrust between HISD and the Sterling community."

As part of the 2014-2015 rezoning, residents of Southcrest, residents of South Park located east of Martin Luther King Boulevard, and some residents of the East End will be rezoned from Jones High School to Sterling.

In 2015 Mitchell became the principal of Waltrip High School. Justin Fuentes, formerly a high school support officer, became the principal of Sterling.

In the 2015-2016 school year the enrollment was 1,142. Circa 2016 over 57% of high school students living in the Sterling attendance boundary attend other high schools in the school district. In the 2016-2017 school year the school had 450 9th grade students, compared to 300 in the 2015-2016 school year.

In the 2020-2021 school year the enrollment was at 1,642. By that year more students living outside of the Sterling attendance area were choosing to attend the school, while fewer students in the Sterling boundary chose to attend other schools.

== Campus ==
The current campus, which opened in 2016, has 237,000 square feet (22,000 m^{2}) of space and had a cost of $72 million. The onsite hangar has 7,100 square feet (660 m^{2}) of space. The three-story building was scheduled to have a capacity of 1,600–1,800 students.

== Demographics ==
As of 2013, according to Mitchell, about 40% of Sterling graduates will go directly to the workforce and the remainder would go to the military and/or to universities and colleges. Mitchell stated that "For a large number of people this is their college experience" citing that large number of Sterling students, dating to the 1960s, never went to colleges or universities after graduation. He stated that this is why some alumni of Sterling have a strong passion for the school.

In the 2022-2023 school year, approximately 92% of the students were classified as being from socioeconomically disadvantaged backgrounds. The racial demographics consisted of:

- 46.2% Hispanic American
- 52.0% African American
- 0.5% White American
- 0.4% Asian American
- 0.1% Native American
- 0.7% Multiracial

== Curriculum ==
Sterling is the home of HISD's high school aviation magnet program; students must take Federal Aviation Administration (FAA) approved-based courses before being eligible to take up to 30 hours of flight time. Students may then take the FAA written examination. As of 2001 Lentz Enterprises and Raiders Tiger Flying Club provides flight instruction to Sterling students; it had done so since circa 1999, and the HISD board of education renewed the club's contract in 2001. In 2000 the magnet program had 200 students. As of 2011 the annual magnet program funding was $46,363.

== Culture ==
Mitchell stated that the student body enjoys Homecoming since "It's like Mardi Gras for a week long."

The school is composed of Hispanic, Latino, and African American Students. The students all actively participate during Hispanic Heritage Month, Black History Month, and Cinco De Mayo. With parties, festivals, fashion shows, committee pot lucks, and much more.

== Neighborhoods served by Sterling ==
Houston neighborhoods served by Sterling include Autumn Glen , South Park, Crestmont Park, Garden Villas, Wayside, Sterling Lakes , King Estates, Edgewood, El Tesoro , Panay Park , Houston Skyscraper Shadows, Gulf Meadows, Airport Gardens, a portion of South Acres, a portion of South Acres Estates, a portion of Minnetex Place, Mykawa, and a portion of Santa Rosa.

Two Houston Housing Authority (HHA) public housing complexes, Long Drive Townhomes and Sweetwater Point, are zoned to Sterling.

== School uniforms ==
Sterling requires school uniforms.

The Texas Education Agency specified that the parents and/or guardians of students zoned to a school with uniforms may apply for a waiver to opt out of the uniform policy so their children do not have to wear the uniform; parents must specify "bona fide" reasons, such as religious reasons or philosophical objections.

== Feeder patterns ==
Elementary schools that feed into Sterling include:

- Codwell
- DeAnda
- Frost
- Mitchell

(partial)

- Alcott
- Cornelius
- Gregg
- Law
- Mading
- Seguín
- Woodson

Middle schools that feed into Sterling include:

- Albert Thomas Middle School (partial)
- Hartman Middle School (partial)

== Notable alumni ==
- Yolanda Adams - gospel singer, radio personality
- Tomur Barnes - former NFL player
- Sedrick Curry - former CFL player
- DJ Screw - hip hop DJ and creator of the Chopped and screwed technique
- Clyde Drexler - NBA Hall-of-Fame basketball player for the Portland Trail Blazers and Houston Rockets (1995 NBA Champion with Rockets).
- Zina Garrison - former tennis player
- Carlette Guidry-White - two time Olympic track and field gold medalist.
- John Hilliard - former NFL player
- Jason Phillips - former NFL player
- Howard Sampson - former NFL player
- Johnny Thomas - former NFL player
- John Washington - former NFL player

== See also ==
- Senior high school
- Davis Aerospace Technical High School in Detroit
- Aviation Career & Technical Education High School in New York
- West Michigan Aviation Academy in Grand Rapids
- Raisbeck Aviation High School in Tukwila (Seattle metropolitan area)
