= Worthing High School (Houston) =

Worthing Early College High School
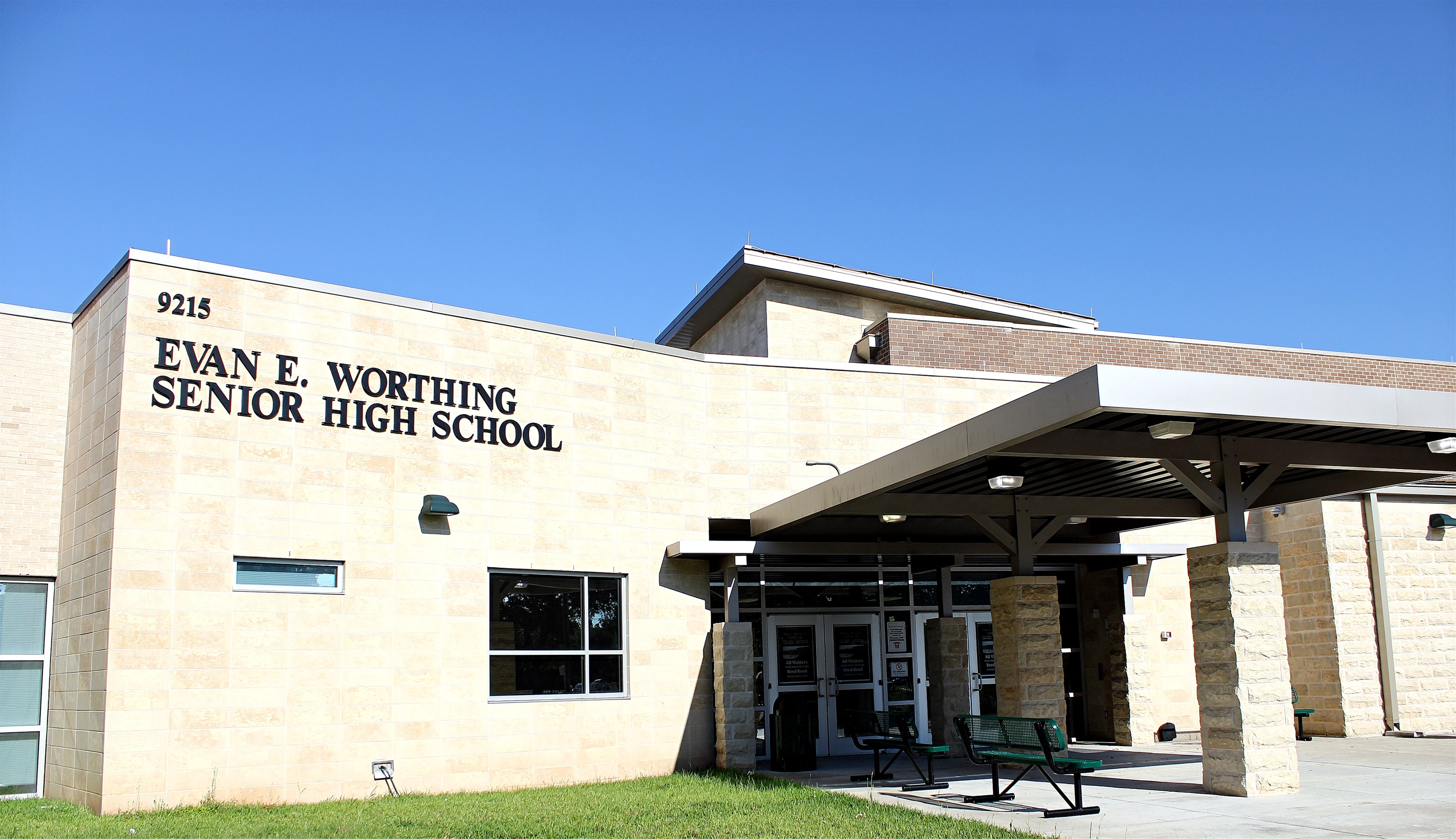

Location
- 9215 Scott Street; Houston, Texas 77051; United States; 29.657335°N 95.366774°W

Information
- Type: Public high school
- Established: 1958; 68 years ago
- Principal: Khalilah Campbell
- Teaching staff: 48.04 (FTE) (2018–19)
- Grades: 9–12
- Enrollment: 786 (2018–19)
- Student to teacher ratio: 16.36 (2018–19)
- Colors: Kelly green, gold and black
- Team name: Colts
- Website: worthing.houstonisd.org

Evan Edward Worthing Early College High School is a secondary school located in the Sunnyside area of Houston, Texas, United States.

Worthing serves grades 9 through 12 and is a part of the Houston Independent School District.

Worthing has Houston ISD's magnet program for Mathematics, Science and Technology.

== History ==
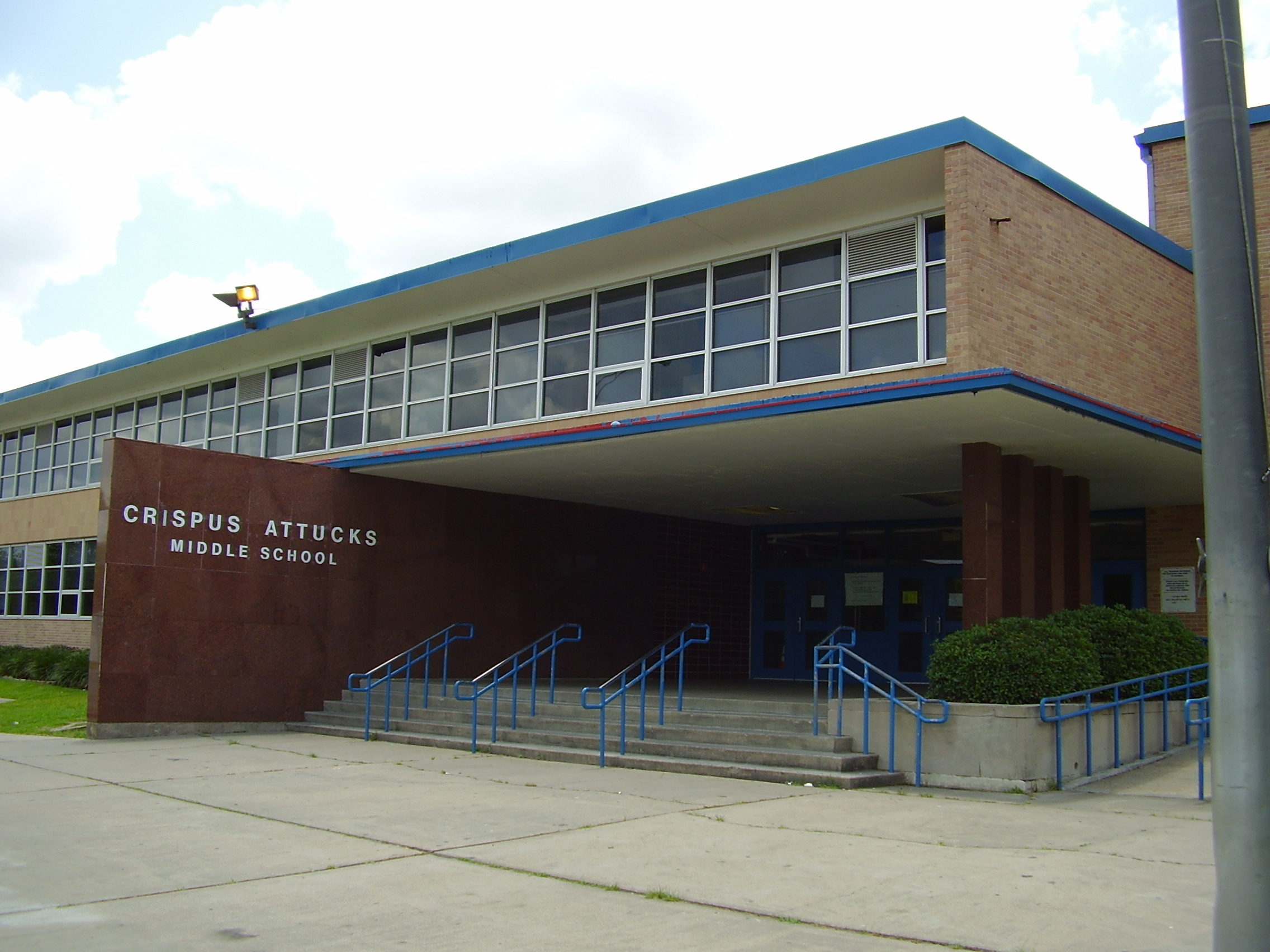
The current campus for Attucks Middle School served as Worthing's first campus

Worthing Junior-Senior High School was built in 1958, and it opened on January 27, 1958. The students zoned to Worthing previously attended Miller Junior High School and Yates High School. The school is named after Evan Edward Worthing, a Houston real-estate developer who set up a scholarship trust for African-American HISD students. A native of Michigan, he earned a mechanical engineering degree from Texas A&M University, where he was captain of the American football team. His will stated that African-Americans should inherit his wealth; this led to the opening of Worthing. The school originally covered grades 7 through 12. Worthing was originally located at 4330 Bellfort Boulevard; as the first building became overcrowded a new high school campus opened. Worthing moved to 9215 Scott Street at Reed Road, and Attucks Middle School opened at the former location.

The first principal was Allen E. Norton, and he stayed in his position until circa 1978. Jacob Carpenter of the Houston Chronicle stated that the "dedicated" staff and "tight-knit community" "ensured students received a quality education" despite the low socioeconomic status of Sunnyside.

An increase in violence and recreational drugs and a socioeconomic decline began damaging Sunnyside in the 1980s. Despite this, enrollment remained stable in the 1990s. Carpenter stated that during the decade the "strong campus leadership" meant that the school had an academic performance in line with Texas standards. However, in the 2000s fewer students enrolled in Worthing and its test scores declined.

=== 2008 Consolidation proposal ===
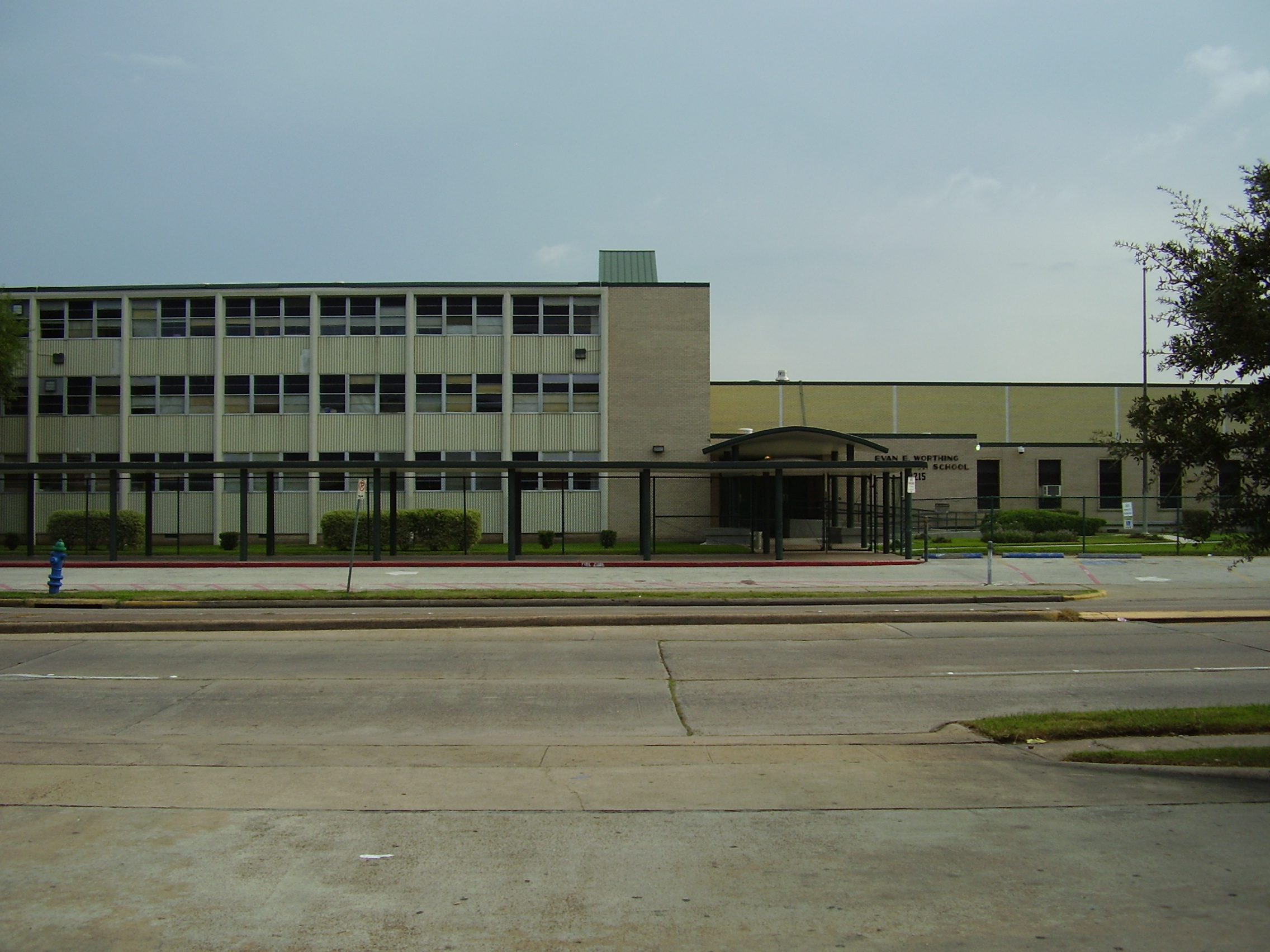
Previous campus

In November 2008 Houston ISD proposed to rebuild Carnegie Vanguard High School on a site adjacent to Worthing, rebuild Worthing, and have the two schools share the same cafeteria and other facilities. School board member Larry Marshall, whose jurisdiction at the time included Carnegie and Worthing, expressed support for this proposal or otherwise to house Carnegie and Worthing on the same plot of land.

Parents at Worthing accepted the proposal while parents at Carnegie rejected it and asked for it to be discontinued. The Carnegie parents said that the higher violence levels at Worthing and the parents' fears of backlash against Carnegie students at Worthing cause them to be opposed to HISD's proposal. Peter Brown, the Houston City Council At-Large Position 1, opposed the idea. Brown said that the renovation of Worthing would be less costly than the consolidation. Brown also cited a Gates Foundation study to support his point.

On December 4, 2008 Abelardo Saavedra, the HISD superintendent, said that he would for now shelve plans since they had insufficient support from the board of trustees. School board trustee Paula M. Harris expressed support for the consolidation plan, arguing that magnet schools and small neighborhood schools, many of which were closed by the district, should be treated in the same manner. Margaret Downing of the Houston Press added that Worthing parents did not like how the controversy "denigrated" the school.

=== 2008-2010s ===
Tamara Sterling became the principal in July 2009; she was the school's first female principal. She later switched jobs, taking one in the Northeast United States, and Todd Nix replaced her in fall 2011. At one point Nix had been accused of promoting academic dishonesty in testing, at a school district he previously worked for, and he resigned from being principal at Worthing. He was later found to have not been responsible for academic dishonesty. HISD superintendent Terry Grier chose John Modest as the new principal. Modest also resigned, but this time due to a severe illness. Duane Clark replaced Modest. Clark lost his job due to low test scores. The school's main football coach, also a special education teacher, stated in a 2018 Houston Chronicle article that morale among the teachers declined due to the constant principal turnover; there had been a total of six from 2008 to 2018. In the period 2011-2018 Worthing had the highest such administrative turnover rate of any Houston high school.

In 2011, two persons opened fire during a powder-puff American football game at Worthing. One man, an 18-year old former student named Tremaine De Ante’ Paul, died. Five other people received injuries. Laura Insensee of Houston Public Media stated that the incident damaged the reputation of the school.

The 2007 school bond specified that Worthing would receive a renovation. On Wednesday March 21, 2012, the school's renovation and expansion groundbreaking ceremony was held. The $805 million bond referendum, approved in elections in 2007, was to fund the renovation and expansion. At the ceremony, Licia Green Ellis, the wife of Texas Senate member Rodney Ellis, gave a $10,000 donation to the school. On December 11, 2014, the beam-signing ceremony of the new Worthing campus occurred. The several design changes and controversies about the construction had delayed the establishment of the wing. It is a part of the 2007 bond program, and as of January 2015 it was one of the few projects from that bond still not completed. Stafford, Texas-based Fort Bend Mechanical was supposed to build the Worthing wing but it got into a legal dispute with HISD. Gil Ramirez, another contractor, accused the owner of Fort Bend Mechanical, David "Pete" Medford, of giving Super Bowl tickets and $25,000 to HISD trustee Larry Marshall in order to get a construction contract with HISD; Ramirez sued HISD and trustee Larry Walker. In addition, the City of Houston Department of Public Works and Engineering approved one set of building plans, but the architectural firm, Molina Walker, then used a different set of plans never approved by the city government to the contractors building the school. Carpenter stated that the delay in the renovation and the infighting reduced trust in HISD within the local community. The new building opened in 2016, around ten years after the intended opening.

As part of the 2014-2015 rezoning, residents of South Park located west of Martin Luther King Boulevard were rezoned from Jones High School to Worthing. John Modest, the principal, stated that he expected to receive 200 new students.

In 2017 HISD officials installed Khalilah Campbell-Rhone, former Thomas Middle School principal, as the principal of Worthing, after the state government threatened to take control of HISD from its school board. The administration chose her because of the school's academic record during her tenure. The board spent increased student support services, added instructional coaches, and gave incentives to teachers, all totalling $1 million. It also removed 60% of the existing teachers and replaced them with new ones.

In a five-year period ending circa 2018 Worthing received $8,100 in funding per student, an amount higher than many other area high schools partially due to the amount of federal funding.

== Student body ==
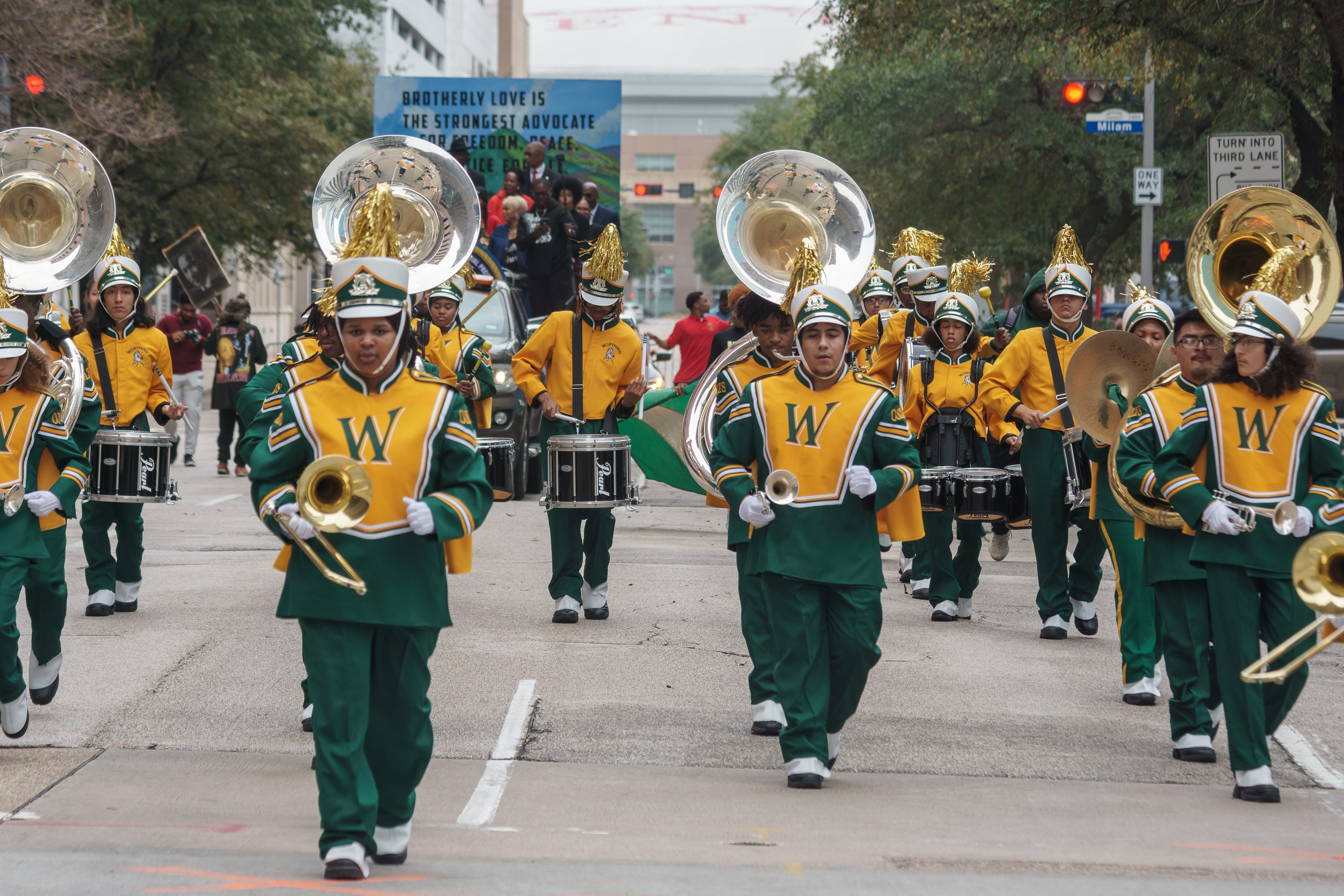
Marching band

In the 1990s the school had around 2,000 students. In 2000 Worthing had over 1,700 students. In the 2013–2014 school year Worthing had 640 students, in 2014-2015 it had 685 students, and as of 2016 it had about 680 students. 86% were African-American, 13% were Hispanic, and the remainder were of other ethnic groups. In 2018 enrollment was around 850; the student body was about 50% of the size in the 1990s and 75% of the enrollment in 2011.

In 2008 65% of the students were classified as being low income. Circa 2016 95% of the students were classified as low income. As of 2018 many U.S. Census tracts around Worthing have median incomes below $20,000. According to Worthing graduate Rodney Ellis, who was the commissioner of Harris County Precinct 1 in 2018, many Worthing students had immediate relatives who were "trapped in the criminal justice system". Carpenter wrote "Nearly all Worthing students deal with the effects of deep, intractable poverty that create longer odds for success in school."

== Academic performance ==
Carpenter stated that in the 1990s the "strong campus leadership" meant that the school had an academic performance in line with Texas standards but that this declined in the 2000s. In 2007, a Johns Hopkins University/Associated Press study referred to Worthing as a "dropout factory" where at least 40% of the entering freshman class does not make it to their senior year.

In 2017, 10% of the students who took Texas state algebra tests performed at standard or above.

Circa 2018 Worthing had multiple indicators of low academic performance. Worthing was the sole Texas high school which did not satisfy any of the Texas Education Agency's academic accountability benchmarks in the period 2014–2018. In 2016 Worthing was the Texas high school with the third lowest the level of academic growth in the State of Texas Assessments of Academic Readiness (STAAR) tests in mathematics and reading. Around 25% of the Class of 2016 enrolled in a post-secondary tertiary institution. In the 2016–2017 school year, the passing rates for STAAR English I end-of-course examinations and algebra end-of-course examinations were 28% and 34-35%, the second lowest and lowest such rates in Texas.

In 2018 the school administration began to make efforts to improve test scores. Carpenter described the preliminary STAAR reading passing percentage for 2017-2018 as "disappointingly stagnant". In the 2017–2018 school year the preliminary passing rate for the algebra examination was 68%.

By 2019 the school's test scores increased; that time below 40% of the students who took Texas state algebra tests performed at standard or above. According to Jacob Carpenter, this test score matched a typical performance of a Texas high school with a similar socioeconomic makeup.

== Student discipline ==
From 2013 to 2018 the school had 17.2 fights per 100 students, a rate higher than other HISD zoned schools.

== Student culture ==
In the 1960s the chess team played in the first integrated chess games in the Houston area.

== Teacher demographics and quality ==
According to HISD's teacher appraisal system the percentage of teachers at the school ranked as "needs improvement" or "ineffective" was 37% for the years 2011–2016, among the highest of any HISD school, while the overall HISD average was 16%.

c. 2019 over 40% of the teachers in each particular school year are not present in the following year.

== Campus ==
A mural that was installed in 2016 in the library as part of the schoolwide renovation depicts the history of Sunnyside and Alma Allen and Rodney Ellis, two state-level politicians from Sunnyside; it was made by Class of 1999 alumna Marye Dean, born and raised in Sunnyside and resident in the State of New York as an attorney. Dean considers Allen and Ellis to be her mentors. The mural has the slogan "Each One Teach One".

== Neighborhoods served by Worthing ==
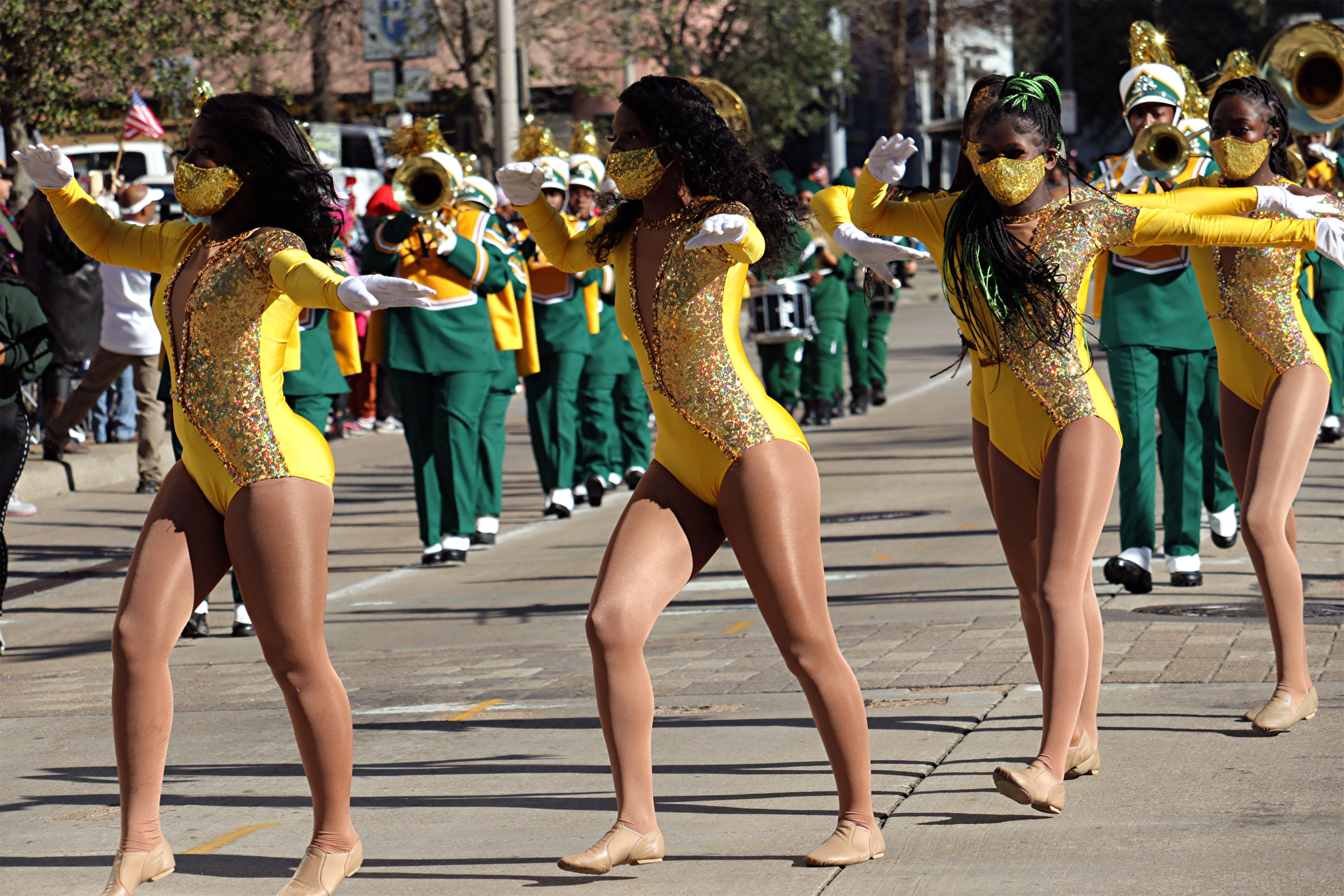
Worthing High School in the 2022 Martin Luther King Jr. Day Parade in Houston

Worthing High School serves Sunnyside, Cullen Estates, Brookhaven, a portion of South Acres and Crestmont Park, a portion of South Acres Estates, Cloverland, Regal Oaks , a portion of Minnetex Place, City Park, Almeda, and Skyview Forest . Hence, Worthing's logo is "Sunnyside Pride." Worthing also serves unincorporated portions of Harris County (such as Brunswick , Brunswick Lakes , Brunswick Meadows , and Morningside Place).

Portions of the city of Pearland are in the Worthing attendance zone.

== School uniforms ==
Worthing requires school uniforms. The Texas Education Agency specifies that the parents and/or guardians of students zoned to a school with uniforms may apply for a waiver to opt out of the uniform policy so their children do not have to wear the uniform; parents must specify "bona fide" reasons, such as religious reasons or philosophical objections.

== Notable alumni ==
- August Alsina - R&B singer from New Orleans
- Rodney Ellis - County Commissioner, Harris County Precinct One; former Texas State Senator
- Milton Carroll - Chairman of CenterPoint Energy since 2002, Chairman of Instrument Products since 1977, Director of Halliburton since 2006, Director of Health Care Service Corporation since 1998, Director of Western Gas Holdings since 2008, Director of LRR Energy, L.P. since 2011.
- Gregory "Cadillac" Anderson - NBA basketball player
- Cliff Branch - NFL football player for Oakland Raiders, 3-time Super Bowl champion
- Terry Ellis - founding member of 90's R&B girl group En Vogue
- Quannel Ralph Evans (Quanell X) - leader of New Black Panther Party in Houston
- Chris Hudson - NFL football player for Atlanta Falcons
- Brian Iwuh - NFL football player
- Dave Lattin - basketball player for 1966 NCAA champion Texas Western, 10th pick of 1967 NBA draft
- Larry Micheaux - basketball player for NBA's Chicago Bulls, Houston Rockets, Kansas City, Milwaukee Bucks, and Kansas City Kings
- Mike Singletary - NFL football player for Chicago Bears, coach, member of Pro Football Hall of Fame
- Lemuel Stinson - NFL football player for Chicago Bears
- Wesley Weston - Houston hip-hop artist better known as Lil' Flip
- Al Dugas - drummer with Michael McDonald
- Otis Taylor - NFL player for Kansas City Chiefs, Super Bowl IV champion
- Gerald Dockery - Arena Football League and CFL pro football player
- Karl Douglas - former CFL quarterback
- Robert Wilson - NFL player
- Marcus Lakee Edwards - Houston hip-hop artist better known as Lil'Keke
- LeMarcus Newman - Former Professional Football player - philanthropist https://www.blackenterprise.com/leo-lemarcus-newman/

== Feeder patterns ==
Elementary schools that feed into Worthing include

- Almeda
- Reynolds
- Young (formerly Sunnyside Elementary)

Elementary schools that partially feed into Worthing include:

- Alcott
- Bastian
- Law
- Whidby
- Woodson

Middle schools that feed into Worthing include Attucks, Lawson (formerly Dowling), and Thomas. No middle schools have all of their attendance boundaries zoned to Worthing.
