= John Hilliard (American football) =

American football player (born 1976)

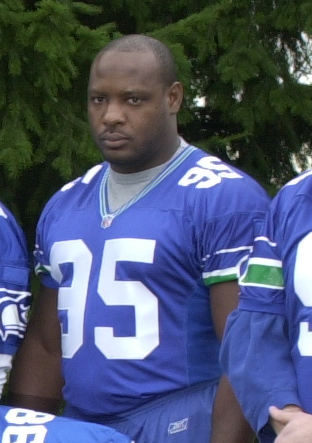
- Hilliard with the Seattle Seahawks in 2002

No. 95
- Position: Defensive end

Personal information
- Born: April 16, 1976 (age 50); Coushatta, Louisiana, U.S.
- Listed height: 6 ft 2 in (1.88 m)
- Listed weight: 295 lb (134 kg)

Career information
- High school: Sterling (Houston, Texas)
- College: Mississippi State
- NFL draft: 2000: 6th round, 190th overall pick

Career history
- Seattle Seahawks (2000–2002); Green Bay Packers (2004)*; New Orleans VooDoo (2005); Grand Rapids Rampage (2005); Kansas City Brigade (2006)
- * Offseason or practice squad member only

Career NFL statistics
- Games played: 27
- Tackles: 38
- Passes defended: 1
- Stats at Pro Football Reference
- Stats at ArenaFan.com

John Edward Hilliard (born April 16, 1976) is an American former professional football player who was a defensive end for three seasons with the Seattle Seahawks of the National Football League (NFL). He was selected by the Seahawks in the sixth round of the 2000 NFL draft after playing college football for the Mississippi State Bulldogs. He was also a member of the Green Bay Packers, New Orleans VooDoo, Grand Rapids Rampage, and Kansas City Brigade.

== Early life and college ==
John Edward Hilliard was born on April 16, 1976, in Coushatta, Louisiana. He attended Sterling High School in Houston, Texas.

Hilliard played college football for the Mississippi State Bulldogs of Mississippi State University. He was a letterman in 1995, 1997, 1998, and 1999. He redshirted the 1996 season.

== Professional career ==
Hilliard was selected by the Seattle Seahawks with the 190th pick in the 2000 NFL draft. He was released by the Seahawks on August 25, 2003.

Hilliard signed with the Green Bay Packers on January 19, 2004. He was released by the Packers on February 27, 2004.

Hilliard was signed by the New Orleans VooDoo on October 28, 2004.

Hilliard was traded to the Grand Rapids Rampage for future considerations on March 29, 2005.

Hilliard signed with the Kansas City Brigade on January 23, 2006.

== NFL career statistics ==
Legend
**Bold**	Career high

Year	Team	Games		Tackles					Interceptions					Fumbles			
Year	Team	GP	GS	Cmb	Solo	Ast	Sck	TFL	Int	Yds	TD	Lng	PD	FF	FR	Yds	TD
2000	SEA	5	0	3	3	0	0.0	0	0	0	0	0	0	0	0	0	0
2001	SEA	**16**	**8**	**21**	11	**10**	0.0	0	0	0	0	0	0	0	0	0	0
2002	SEA	6	3	14	**12**	2	0.0	**5**	0	0	0	0	**1**	0	0	0	0
		27	11	38	26	12	0.0	5	0	0	0	0	1	0	0	0	0
