= Jones Futures Academy =

High school in Houston, Texas, USA

Coordinates: 29.6746°N 95.3403°W

Information
- Former name: Jesse H. Jones High School
- Established: 1956; 70 years ago
- School district: Houston Independent School District
- Grades: 9-12
- Website: www.houstonisd.org/jones

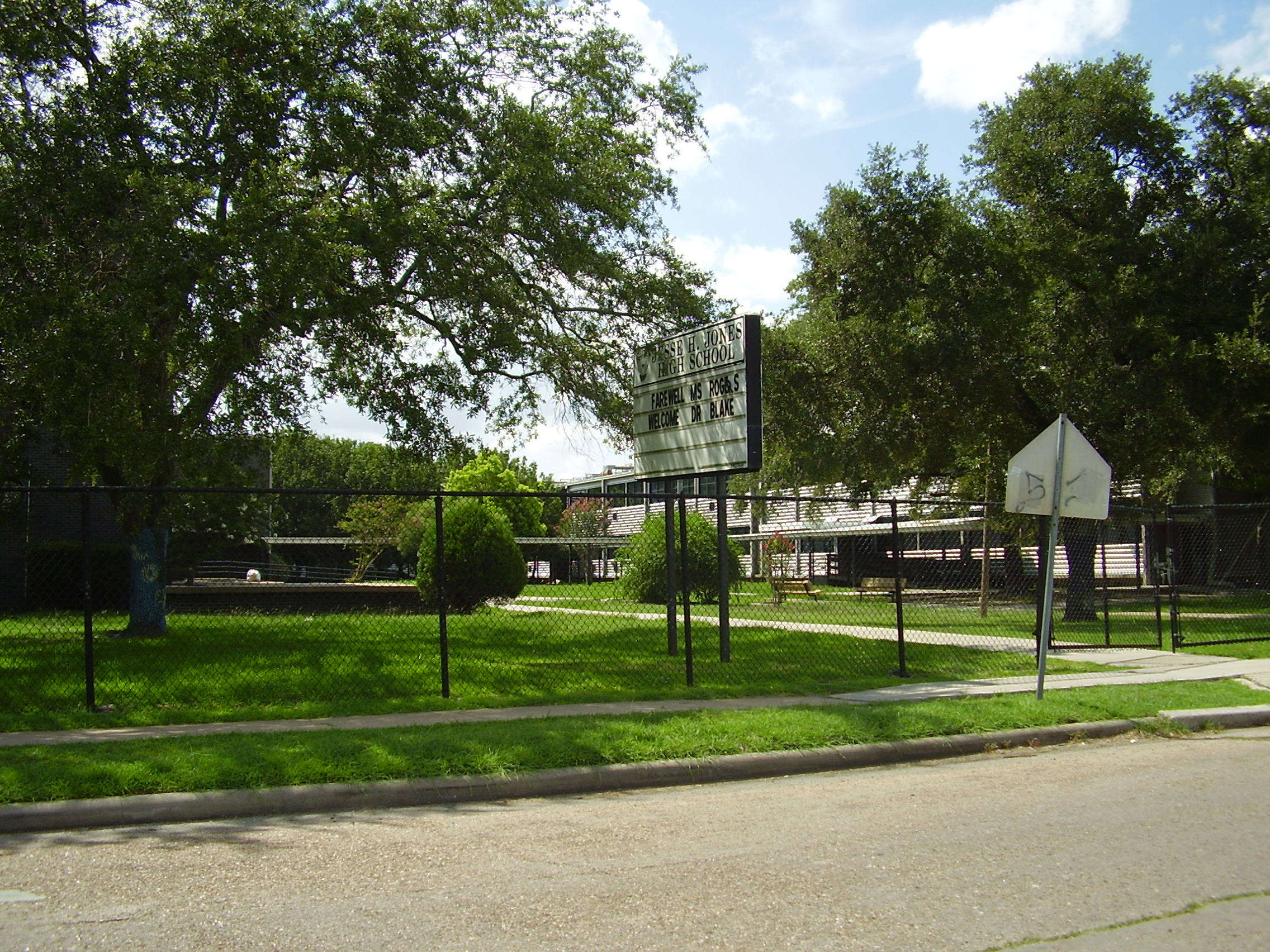
Jones High School

Jones Futures Academy, previously Jesse H. Jones High School, is a public high school in South Park, Houston, Texas, United States. It has Dual Credit Magnet Program with emphasis in Health Sciences and Petroleum Engineering. Students who maintain the course of the entire program would graduate high school in May/June of their Sr. year and will have the ability to receive an associate degree in August following their graduation in one of their offered degree programs. Jones, which serves grades 9 through 12, is a part of the Houston Independent School District. Jones was named after Jesse Holman Jones.

As of 2010 Empowerment South Early College High School is located on the Jones campus. As of 2014 Milby High School students in grades 10-12 were housed in this campus.

== History ==
Jones opened in 1956. Jones was established as an all-white high school. Starting with its desegregation by 1970, the student body increasingly became mostly African-American.

According to police reports, on September 21, 1990, during a class at Jones, a 16-year-old girl fatally stabbed 18-year-old Anthony Johnson in the upper back with a hunting knife; no teacher was present in the room, and a student received a cut on his hand when he tried to stop the incident. Johnson died at Ben Taub Hospital. Dianna Hunt of the Houston Chronicle reported that the boy "apparently" said a "disparaging comment about her clothing." The suspect was placed in the Harris County Juvenile Probation Department. This gave Jones a reputation as being a violent school.

For the 2000-2001 school year, Jones did not have a high school yearbook or senior photographs since the school administration had not been paying the bills that would have allowed those functions to occur. For the 2001-2002 school year, only Vanguard program students would appear in the school yearbook.

Margaret Downing of the Houston Press said in 2002 that the school's administration had no knowledge of whether students were in class.

On September 15, 2005, Houston natives and New Orleans Hurricane Katrina refugees fought in the school. The fight made national headlines.

A 2007 Johns Hopkins University study cited Jones as a "dropout factory" where at least 40 percent of the entering freshman class does not make it to their senior year. During that year, 55 percent of children zoned to Jones chose to attend a different Houston ISD school.

=== Repurposing of Jones ===
In a continuous five-year period until 2010, Jones failed to meet academic standards. That year, Terry Grier, the superintendent of HISD, proposed converting Jones into an all-magnet school. During that year around 900 pupils in the Jones attendance zone, about 2/3 of the high-school-age children in that area, choose to attend another HISD school.

In 2010, the school received a science, technology, engineering and mathematics program funded by a federal grant. $2 million was allocated to teacher training, computers, and science laboratories. However, the program did not attract many students who did not live in the Jones attendance boundary. In 2010 Grier added the school to the Apollo program. This meant the school day at Jones was extended and that the school received a new principal, a new set of teachers, and new mathematics tutors.

HISD originally stated that Jones would get a new campus as part of the 2012 bond. In March 2013, the HISD school board were scheduled to vote on school closures, but community members asked board member Paula Harris to stand with them against the consolidations. In 2014 HISD announced that the school board will vote on whether to close Jones and four other schools. Grier argued that Jones needs to be closed so the campus can be used to house another school as its new campus is being constructed. According to the 2010 U.S. census, about 2,000 high-school-age children live in the Jones attendance zone, but fewer than 500 attend Jones. Paula Harris, an HISD board member, stated her opposition to closing Jones.

On March 13, 2014, the HISD board voted 6-3 to keep the Jones campus open and convert it into an alternative career-readiness school for students throughout HISD. In the new Jones, students may earn associates degrees. Jones will no longer be a zoned school, and its athletics programs will be discontinued. Students wishing to play for athletic teams would try out for teams at their zoned schools. Students in its attendance boundary will be rezoned to Sterling High School and Worthing High School.

The board meeting regarding the closure of Jones was held at 4 PM. The school district opened an overflow room due to the large number of people attending; people in the overflow room saw the meeting through a television. During this meeting, Manuel Rodriguez, a board member, introduced the modified motion to convert Jones. The audience had a positive reception when Rodriguez stated that Jones would remain open, but it had a negative reception when he revealed the terms. Board member Rhonda Skillern-Jones, formerly a member of the Houston City Council, stated that there were not enough board votes to keep Jones as a comprehensive high school, so the conversion was politically necessary. Members of the public criticized the loss of the athletic programs at Jones. Texas House of Representatives member Borris Miles also argued that the compromise was politically feasible while keeping Jones as a zoned school was not.

In 2014 the Jones campus began housing Milby High School students in grades 10-12 while their campus is under construction. In order to accommodate the Milby students there was a portable restroom and eight trailer classrooms posted at Jones.

== Vanguard program ==
Jones had the Vanguard gifted and talented magnet program from fall 1977 to spring 2002. Ericka Mellon of the Houston Chronicle wrote that the program was "prestigious".

Throughout its history, the Vanguard program of Jones had a high of 300 students. As of 2002 the Vanguard program had 187 students. Of the students, 40% were White, 30% were African American, and over 20% were Hispanic. Margaret Downing of the Houston Press said that many people, including Jones principal Lawrence Allen Jr., had portrayed the school as being majority White when it was majority minority. At the time, the overall school had 1,277 students. It had an African American and Hispanic majority student body. The program had class sizes of 7 to 19 students. The teachers did not use rote teaching styles. Students knew each other very well. Downing said that many students did not want to attend Bellaire High School and Lamar High School, even though they were very well renowned, because they perceived them "as too big, too impersonal, too preppy and too concentrated on rote learning." Many White students wanted to attend Jones Vanguard because they would be a racial minority at Jones and wanted to learn about another culture. The Vanguard students competed with the regular students for class rankings slots. The highest class rankings had guaranteed admission to universities in Texas, and Vanguard students had higher grade point averages than regular students.

Parents of children in the program clashed with the administration of the school over various matters. Members of the Vanguard community accused various administrators, receptionists, and teachers of expressing a disdain for the Vanguard program because of a belief that the Vanguard program expressed elitism. Parents also criticized the school for not properly marking attendance sheets, forcing parents to examine attendance records and question the Jones administration about attendance. In the fall of 2001, the Vanguard program got Dr. James Simpson as a principal of a separate school.

The move that prompted the program's separation from Jones High School altogether was the reinstatement of Allen, a fired Jones principal who was reinstated several days later after protests from neighborhood residents, African-American Vanguard parents and Jones alumni. Craig Beverly, a 1979 graduate of Jones Vanguard, restarted the Jones Alumni Association when his son informed him that Allen was being removed from his post. Beverly argued that Allen needed to be reinstated. Kaye Stripling, the interim superintendent, said that the reinstatement had nothing to do with Quanell X's protests for local Houston-area news stations, and that it had nothing to do with the fact that Allen's mother, Alma Allen, was a member of the Texas State Board of Education. When reinstated he only was in charge of the comprehensive program at Jones. Stripling decided to let Allen keep his job, but she allowed the Vanguard program to move to the former Carnegie Elementary School. Beverly said that he was going to sue the district to try to stop the Vanguard program from leaving Jones.

By fall 2002, the program was moved to a separate school, Carnegie Vanguard High School. Margaret Downing of the Houston Press said that some parents told her that school administration officials asked African-American students to stay at Jones and take Advanced Placement classes instead of moving to Carnegie Vanguard. School officials said that they did not ask students to stay at Jones.

Andy Dewey, an HISD teacher quoted in a Houston Chronicle article, stated that the loss of the magnet program resulted in a loss of students and prestige, and that it was the beginning of the decline of Jones. In later years Jones had a magnet for science technology engineering and mathematics, but Michael Cordona of HISD stated "The kids just aren’t coming" despite the resources HISD spent on the program.

== Student body ==
In February 2014 Jones had 440 students, making it the smallest comprehensive high school in HISD. About 90% students are low income. Erica Mellon of the Houston Chronicle wrote that "few students are choosing Jones".

In 1993 there were 1,300 students at Jones. About 10% were from low income families. This was below the HISD average. As of 1993, 78% of the students were black, 14% were Hispanic, and several were Anglo Whites. By 2001 the Hispanic population had increased, and the school had its first homecoming queen of Hispanic or Latino origin in 1999.

As of 2006, Jones High School had 1,077 students, and is majority African American (58%) with a large Hispanic American minority (40%). White Americans and Asian Americans each make up 1% of the student body. Approximately 83% of the students qualify for free and reduced lunch programs.

== Academic performance and funding ==
The nonprofit Children at Risk in 2011 ranked Jones High School the lowest in the Houston area. Students take few advanced courses and post low test scores. Roughly half drop out. This is despite higher than average funding per student of $9,257 as compared to the average of $7,355 spend per student according to the Texas Education Agency.

== Facility ==
Jones is located in the middle of South Park, a neighborhood described by Margaret Downing of the Houston Press as "run down." Downing said in 2002 that Jones was an "eyesore with sewer backups, graffiti, nasty restrooms and moldy locker rooms."

== Dress code ==
Jones students are required to wear school uniforms. Permitted shirts are polo shirts colored black, white, and yellow. Bottoms may be black or khaki.

As principal, Lawrence Allen installed standardized dress to, in his words, "to remove competition in clothing."

== Neighborhoods zoned to Jones ==
Neighborhoods once zoned to Jones include South Park, Southcrest, Golfcrest, Greenway, Lum Terrace, and a portion of Santa Rosa.

The Long Drive Townhomes, a unit of public housing, is zoned to Jones.

According to HISD data, in the 2013-2014 school year, 915 HISD students zoned to Jones chose to attend other HISD schools. Over 75% of these students were Hispanic. Luis Calisto, a man quoted in a Houston Chronicle article who had dropped out of Jones, stated that circa 2004 there had been fights between black and Hispanic students, so several Hispanic students opted to attend the majority Hispanic Chavez High School and Milby High School. Ericka Mellon of the Houston Chronicle wrote that South Park, where the school is located, was "struggling".

== Notable alumni ==
- Lawrence Allen, member of Texas State Board of Education
- Daniel Gibson - NBA Basketball player for the Cleveland Cavaliers.
- Darrell Green - Former Professional American football player for the Washington Redskins and Pro Football Hall of Famer
- Gene Phillips - Former professional basketball player for the Dallas Chaparrals
- Alfred Williams - Professional American football player, drafted by the Cincinnati Bengals in 1991
- Jo Beth Williams - Actress
- Rickie Thompson (born 1959), American high jumper
- Elizabeth Watson, first female police chief, City of Houston

== Feeder patterns ==
Elementary schools that feed into Jones include:

- Golfcrest
- Kelso

Partial

- Alcott
- Bastian
- Brookline
- Cornelius
- Gregg
- Seguín

Portions of the attendance zones of Attucks Middle School and Hartman Middle School fed into Jones.
