= Sedrick Curry =

American gridiron football player (born 1976)

No. 23, 3
- Position: Defensive back

Personal information
- Born: November 23, 1976 (age 49); Houston, Texas, U.S.
- Listed height: 6 ft 1 in (1.85 m)
- Listed weight: 197 lb (89 kg)

Career information
- High school: Sterling (Houston)
- College: Texas A&M (1995–1999)
- NFL draft: 2000: undrafted

Career history
- Pittsburgh Steelers (2000)*; Detroit Lions (2000)*; Birmingham Thunderbolts (2001); BC Lions (2001–2002)
- * Offseason or practice squad member only

Sedrick Demon Curry (born November 23, 1976) is an American former professional football defensive back who played for the BC Lions of the Canadian Football League (CFL) and the Birmingham Thunderbolts of the XFL. He played college football at Texas A&M University.

== Early life ==
Sedrick Demon Curry was born on November 23, 1976, in Houston, Texas. He attended Sterling High School in Houston.

== College career ==
Curry played college football for the Texas A&M Aggies of Texas A&M University. He redshirted the 1995 season and was a four-year letterman from 1996 to 1999. He started eight games his redshirt sophomore year in 1997 and led the team with three interceptions. Curry had knee surgery in 1998 but still ended up playing in every game that season, recording 36 tackles, three interceptions and five pass breakups. He started 11 games as a senior in 1999, totaling 48 tackles, three interceptions, five pass breakups, and two fumble recoveries. He majored in speech communications at Texas A&M.

== Professional career ==
Curry was rated the 37th best cornerback in the 2000 NFL draft by NFLDraftScout.com. He signed with the Pittsburgh Steelers on April 17, 2000, after going undrafted. He was released on July 27, 2000.

Curry was signed by the Detroit Lions on July 30, 2000. He was soon released on August 6, 2000.

In October 2000, Curry was selected by the Birmingham Thunderbolts in the tenth round, with the 79th overall pick, of the 2001 XFL draft. He played in all ten games for the Thunderbolts during the 2001 XFL season, posting eight tackles and one sack. The XFL folded after the season.

Curry signed with the BC Lions of the Canadian Football League (CFL) on June 1, 2001. He dressed in 15 games for the Lions during the 2001 CFL season, recording 17 defensive tackles, eight special teams tackles, and two pass breakups. He dressed in eight games in 2002, totaling 16 defensive tackles, six special teams tackles, one interception, and one pass breakup.
