= Houston Academy for International Studies =

Public high school in Texas, United States

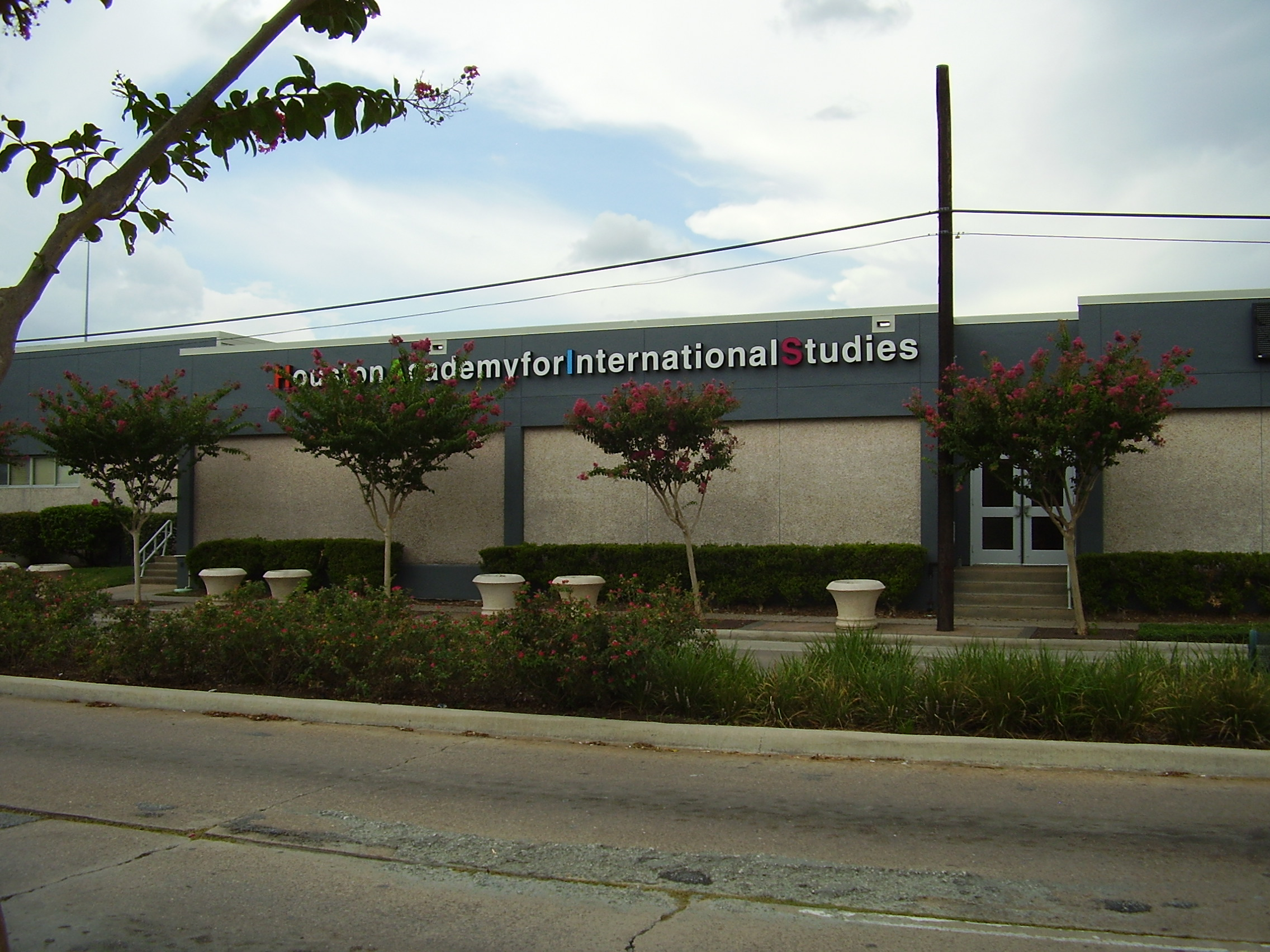

Location
- 1810 Stuart Street; Houston, Texas 77004; United States; 29.737018°N 95.370126°W

Information
- Type: Public high school
- Principal: Melissa Jacobs Thibaut
- Faculty: 19.57 (FTE)
- Grades: 9-12
- Enrollment: 487 (2017-18)
- Student to teacher ratio: 24.89
- Website: Official Website

The Houston Academy for International Studies (HAIS) is a Houston Independent School District charter school in Midtown Houston, Texas, United States. It is located near the Houston Community College System's Central College campus. It opened in August 2006.

== Mission ==
The school focuses on preparing students for university and their roles in society as global citizens. It is a small high-school program, designed to serve up to 400 students in grades 9 through 12. It opened initially to 100 9th graders for the 2006-2007 school year and plans to add a new 9th-grade class of 100 students every year, as each previous class advances. The new campus for HAIS is located at the former J. Will Jones Elementary, also located in Midtown; it was scheduled to open for the new 09-10 school year in the fall.

The Academy is a partnership with the Houston Independent School District, the Houston Community College Central Campus, Houston A+ Challenge and the Asia Society’s Network of International Studies Schools.

== Administration ==
The school's principal, Melissa Jacobs-Thibaut, is a professional administrator, educator and community-development specialist with 13 years of urban and international teaching, teacher training and leadership experience. Between 1996 and 2001, she worked for the United States Peace Corps on assignment in Cape Verde and Mozambique. Since 2001, Jacobs-Thibaut was the Instructional Coordinator and Charter Manager at Cage Elementary School/Project Chrysalis Middle School in Houston.

== Attendance ==
=== Admissions ===
To be accepted at HAIS, potential students must submit completed applications along with supporting documentation, which are submitted to a general lottery drawing.

=== School uniforms ===
As of the 2017 And 2018 school year there will be no uniform policy but the students will still have to follow the HISD school dress code.

=== Curriculum ===
In preparation for university and possible careers in international business, students are required to complete two service-learning projects, four years of foreign language study, and the curriculum required by the Texas Scholars program. To graduate, they must also complete a 180-hour, internationally focused internship.

Students in grades 11 and 12 will be able to earn both high-school and college credit by taking HCC classes. The Academy also provides students with the opportunity to participate in international programs such as Model United Nations.

== Demographics ==
As of 2022, 93.4% of the students were racial and ethnic minorities and 68% were low income students.

The demographics for the 2021 - 2022 school year are listed below.

Race/Ethnicity	Percentage
African American	38.7%
White	6.6%
Hispanic	51.9%
Asian	1.8%
Two or More	0.8%
Indigenous American	0.2%

== Transportation ==
A METRORail Red Line stop, the Ensemble/HCC Station, is located nearby, as are several METRO bus routes.

== See also ==
- Houston A+ Challenge
