= Rickie Thompson =

American high jumper (born 1959)

Personal information
- Born: December 1, 1959 (age 66)
- Home town: Abilene, Texas
- Education: Jefferson Middle School (Abilene, Texas); Jones Futures Academy; University of Texas at El Paso; Houston Christian University
- Height: 198 cm (6 ft 6 in)
- Weight: 84 kg (185 lb)

Sport
- Country: United States
- Sport: Sport of athletics
- Event: High jump
- College team: UTEP Miners; Houston Christian Huskies
- Club: Bayou City Track Club

Achievements and titles
- National finals: 1983 NCAAs; • High jump, 1st (gold)
- Personal best: HJ: 2.30m (1983)
- Updated on 1 January 2024

Richie Thompson (born December 1, 1959), better known as Rickie Thompson or Ricky Thompson, is an American former high jumper. In 1983, he became the first ever national champion for the Houston Christian Huskies in any sport by winning the 1983 NCAA Division I Outdoor Track and Field Championships in the high jump.

== Career ==
As a prep, Thompson competed for Jefferson Middle School in the Abilene Independent School District. He competed for Jones Futures Academy in high school before committing to the University of Texas at El Paso.

Thompson initially competed for the UTEP Miners track and field team for two years before transferring to Houston Baptist University (now Houston Christian University) so that he could play basketball as well. At the 1983 NCAA Division I Outdoor Track and Field Championships, Thompson defeated the defending champion Milt Ottey of UTEP to win Houston Christian's first ever individual title. Ottey was recovering from an injury, though both jumpers had difficulties with the sun shining in their eyes on the takeoff. Thompson won the event at 7 ft 5 1/4 in (2.26 m) – he attempted 7 ft 7 in (2.31 m) three times but did not make that height. Thompson also competed overseas post-season, winning the 1983 Palio Città della Quercia meet in Italy. His performances earned himself a ranking of #7 in the U.S. that year, behind #1-ranked Tyke Peacock.

Thompson competed at the 1984 United States Olympic trials, but he did not qualify for the trials finals and thus did not make the U.S. Olympic team.

== Personal life ==
Thompson is from Abilene, Texas. He competed for the Bayou City Track Club. In 1997, he was inducted into the Houston Christian Huskies Hall of Fame.

== Statistics ==
=== Personal best progression ===
High Jump progression
#	Mark	Pl.	Competition	Venue	Date	Ref.
1	2.23 m	1st place, gold medalist(s)		Provo, UT	8 May 1981	
2	2.24 m	2nd place, silver medalist(s)		Houston, TX	7 May 1982	
3	2.30 m	1st place, gold medalist(s)		Houston, TX	27 May 1983	
