= Southcrest, Houston =

Human settlement in Houston, Texas, US

Coordinates: 29.677°N 95.330°W

Southcrest is a community in southeastern Houston, Texas. It is bordered by the 610 Loop, Martin Luther King Boulevard, Bellfort Boulevard, and Mykawa Road.

Dana Milbank of The Washington Post said in 2001 that a portion of Southcrest has "dilapidated houses, empty lots and pocked streets."

In 2006, prices of houses ranged from $30,000 to $84,000. Carissa D. Lamkahouan of the Houston Chronicle said in 2007 that "prices have remained reasonable" because Southcrest is south of the 610 Loop. In 2006 20 homes sold in Southcrest. Of them, 20% were foreclosures. Matt Swift, owner of Swift & Co. Realty, said that many foreclosures occurred because many of Southcrest's residents were lower-middle and middle income households who were unable to afford home ownership and/or ancillary expenses that came with home ownership.

In 2007, Lamkahouan said that a surge in homebuilding in the community occurred due to its proximity to major freeways such as the 610 Loop and Texas State Highway 288 and an abundance of vacant lots. LaRence Snowden, a realtor at Womack Development Investments, said "Carissa D. Lamkahouan of the Houston Chronicle said that the community "is hot right now. There is a lot of new home building going on, and if you drive the neighborhood there are still [6,000-square-foot (560 m^{2}), 7,000-square-foot (650 m^{2})] lots available."

== Education ==
The community is within the Houston Independent School District. Kelso Elementary School is located in Southcrest. Much of Southcrest is zoned to Kelso, and some of Southcrest is zoned to Alcott Elementary School. All of Southcrest is zoned to Attucks Middle School and Jones High School.

On Thursday March 13, 2014, the HISD board voted 6–3 to keep the Jones campus open and convert it into an alternative career readiness school for students throughout HISD. Jones will no longer be a zoned school. Residents of Southcrest will be rezoned to Sterling High School for the 2014–2015 school year.

== Parks and recreation ==
Southcrest Park is operated by the City of Houston's Parks and Recreation Department. It has a basketball half court, a basketball full court, a 300-foot (91 m) multipurpose field, a trail system, and a playground. Southcrest Park is adjacent to Kelso Elementary. By 2001 its baseball field, bleachers, and swimming pool had closed. The sign which marked the park, in 2001, was rusting and was missing several letters.
