= Robert Wilson (running back) =

American football player (born 1969)

No. 20, 42, 49
- Position: Running back

Personal information
- Born: January 13, 1969 (age 57); South Park, Houston, U.S.
- Listed height: 6 ft 0 in (1.83 m)
- Listed weight: 255 lb (116 kg)

Career information
- High school: Worthing (Houston)
- College: Texas A&M (1987–1990)
- NFL draft: 1991: 3rd round, 80th overall pick

Career history
- Tampa Bay Buccaneers (1991); Green Bay Packers (1993)*; Dallas Cowboys (1994); Miami Dolphins (1994–1996)
- * Offseason or practice squad member only

Career NFL statistics
- Rushing yards: 183
- Rushing average: 4.1
- Receptions: 23
- Receiving yards: 129
- Touchdowns: 3
- Stats at Pro Football Reference

Robert Eugene Wilson (born January 13, 1969) is an American former professional football player who was a running back for four seasons in the National Football League (NFL) with the Tampa Bay Buccaneers, Dallas Cowboys and Miami Dolphins. He was selected by the Buccaneers in the third round of the 1991 NFL draft after playing college football for the Texas A&M Aggies.

== Early life and college ==
Robert Eugene Wilson was born on January 13, 1969, in South Park, Houston. He attended Worthing High School in Houston.

Wilson played college football for the Texas A&M Aggies of Texas A&M University. He was redshirted in 1987 and was a three-year letterman from 1988 to 1990. He rushed 84 times for 425 yards and ten touchdowns his redshirt freshman year in 1988 while also catching six passes for 39 yards. In 1989, Wilson recorded 125 carries for 590 yards and five touchdowns, and 17 receptions for 163 yards and two touchdowns. As a redshirt junior in 1990, he ran 134 times for 724 and five touchdowns while catching nine passes for 75 yards and one touchdown. Wilson skipped his senior season to enter the 1991 NFL draft.

== Professional career ==
Wilson was selected by the Tampa Bay Buccaneers in the third round, with the 80th overall pick, of the 1991 NFL draft. He officially signed with the team on July 15. He played in all 16 games, starting 15, for Buccaneers as a fullback during his rookie year in 1991, rushing 42 times for 179 yards while also catching 20 passes for 121 yards and two touchdowns. He also fumbled three times, recovered one fumble, and returned two kicks for 19 yards. Wilson was released on September 1, 1992.

Wilson signed with the Green Bay Packers on February 8, 1993. He was released on August 23, 1993.

Wilson was signed by the Dallas Cowboys on April 29, 1994. He appeared in four games for the Cowboys during the 1994 season, recording one carry for negative one yard. He was released on October 25, 1994.

Wilson signed with the Miami Dolphins on November 9, 1994. He played in two games for the Dolphins that year but did not record any statistics. He appeared in all 16 games in 1995, totaling one rushing attempt for five yards, one reception for three yards on one target, and one fumble recovery. He also appeared in one playoff game for the Dolphins that year. Wilson became a free agent after the 1995 season and re-signed with the Dolphins on March 5, 1996. He played in 15 games during the 1996 season, rushing once for no yards, catching two passes for five yards and one touchdown on two targets, and returning one kick for 12 yards. He was released on August 20, 1997.
