= South Park, Houston =

Neighborhood in Houston, Texas, United States

Coordinates: 29.67°N 95.34°W

Not to be confused with South Park, the adult animated show.

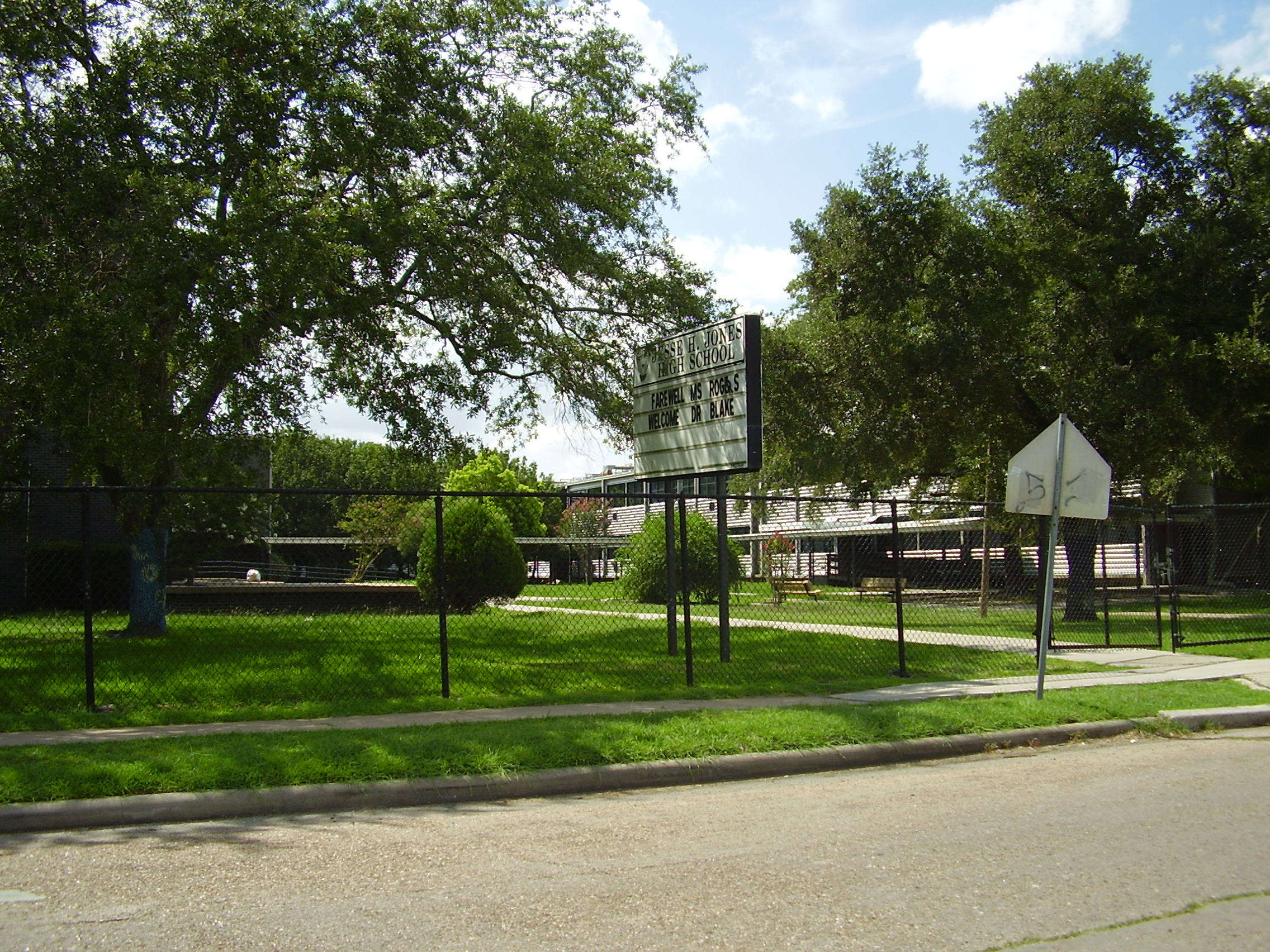
Jones High School

South Park is a broad post-World War II development in the south-central area of Houston, Texas, a few miles south of MacGregor Park and directly south of the 610 Loop. According to the 2000 Census, the community has a population of 22,282. 81% of the South Park population is African American, compared to 25% for the city as a whole. Houston's Martin Luther King Boulevard (formerly South Park Boulevard) runs through the area. Reflecting its postwar origins, many streets in South Park are named after World War II battle sites and persons. In the 1980s and 1990s crime became a key issue for South Park. Katharine Shilcutt of the Houston Press said "South Park is an overgrown garden these days, its soil only able to be tilled by the most determined or the most desperate. It shows no sign that it will grow again any time in the near future."

== History ==
South Park, a post-World War II development, had mostly middle class White American families during the 1950s and early 1960s. Many of the homebuyers were veterans of World War II, and streets were named after battles and people that the homebuyers knew from personal experience. (Note: For example, the east/west streets in the neighborhood, starting South from 610 are named after Malmedy - a massacre in Germany, Bataan - a death march in the Philippines, Chennault - a general, Rapido - a river crossing, Dieppe - a battle in France, Tarawa - a battle in the Pacific, Anzio - a battle in Italy, Tobruk - a siege in North Africa, Burma - a battle operation in Asia, St. Lo - a battle in France, Doolittle - a general, Southseas - a series of battles in the Pacific, Pershing - the General of the Armies, and Van Fleet - a general.) When South Park served as a suburb, lawns were neatly trimmed and area children traveled to places by bicycle.

The 610 Loop opened in the 1960s. Katharine Shilcutt of the Houston Press stated that some residents believed that the opening of 610 marked the beginning of South Park's decline. Ralph Gonzales, a former resident quoted by Shilcutt, said that the opening of 610 caused traffic to increase in the area and allowed residents of other sections of the city to more easily reach South Park.

Shilcutt added that the forced integration of Jones High School and nearby Sterling High School hastened demographic changes; White families began to move to newer suburbs, such as Pasadena and Pearland. Dave Straughan, a former sergeant of the Houston Police Department's robbery division who served his rookie beat in South Park, said that several factors caused South Park to decline as a neighborhood; by the 1970s crime was beginning to increase.

In 1977 the Houston City Council voted to honor Dr. Martin Luther King Jr. by renaming South Park Boulevard, a major area thoroughfare, to Martin Luther King Boulevard. The renaming was effective on April 5, 1978.

Shilcutt said that South Park was no longer considered a suburb by the late 1980s, and that crime became a major concern. In 1987 South Park was still considered to be a mixed race neighborhood.

Schilcutt said that when the White population in South Park became insignificant in the 1990s, the City of Houston government began to ignore the remaining residents. By 1993 the infrastructure of the neighborhood had severely declined, with the sewer and water lines beginning to rust and buckle. Al Calloway, a member of the Houston City Council proposed spending a $57.5 million cash surplus on improving the sewer and water lines of South Park; Calloway said "residents in neighborhoods such as South Park or Sunnyside may die before the projects are done." The City of Houston never spent the surplus.

In October 1994 25 inches (64 cm) of rain fell in one day, causing flooding that caused the displacement of over 10,000 people in Greater Houston. The Sims Bayou overfilled, flooding businesses and houses in South Park. Few of the residents had flood insurance. Some businesses and houses were abandoned as a result of the flood.

As time passed, Hispanic residents moved into South Park, as part of a trend of Hispanics in the Houston area moving into black majority neighborhoods. Between 1990 and 2000, the Hispanic population of South Park increased by between 5 and 10 percent. In the same period, the black population of both South Park and Sunnyside declined by 4,225, or 11% as majority African-American neighborhoods in Houston had declines in their black populations. In 2000 82% of the neighborhood was Black, and 16% of the area population was Hispanic. In 2005 Lori Rodriguez of the Houston Chronicle said that South Park was among a group of mostly African American neighborhoods that could become as much as 25% Hispanic and Latino by the end of the decade of the 2000s. In 2009 almost 20% of the neighborhood was Hispanic. As of the 2010 census South Park does not have any White residents. In 2011 the projected percentages for 2016 were 81% Black and 22% Hispanic.

In 2007 South Park was one of several Houston neighborhoods with a high concentration of felons.

As of 2011 the median yearly income is $33,196, a 15% decrease from 2000's number. As of the same year the median housing price is $50,400, a 15% increase from 2000's number. In a 10-year span ending in 2011, the foreign-born population of South Park increased by almost 10%.

== Demographics ==
The City of Houston-defined South Park Super Neighborhood had 21,208 people in 2015. 67% were non-Hispanic black, 31% were Hispanic, 1% were non-Hispanic white, and 2% were non-Hispanic others. The percentage of non-Hispanic Asians was zero. In 2000 the super neighborhood had 22,282 people. 81% were non-Hispanic black, 16% were Hispanic, and 1% each were non-Hispanic white and other. The percentage of non-Hispanic Asians was zero.

== Cityscape ==
The South Park subdivision has four sections. Section 1 is bounded by Calhoun Road, a line south of Pershing Boulevard, a line east of St. Lo Road, and a line north of Doolittle Road. One part of Sections 2-4 is bounded by the 610 Loop, a line south and west of Burma Road, a line south of St. Lo Road, and a line east of Kassarine Pass. Another portion of Sections 2-4 is bound by Calhoun, 18th, Jutland, and a line north of Southwind Avenue. Another portion is wedged between St. Lo and Martin Luther King Boulevard (formerly named South Park Boulevard).

The wider South Park area is bounded by the 610 Loop, Cullen Boulevard, the Sims Bayou, and Mykawa Road.

Several small and well-maintained houses share the area with mostly deteriorating properties and vacant lots. By 2000 many houses adjacent to MLK Boulevard became converted to house commercial usage. In 2005 Lori Rodriguez of the Houston Chronicle said that South Park had several abandoned businesses. As of 2011 trash is present in some front yards in South Park. As of 2011 the median yearly income is $33,196, a 15% decrease from 2000's number. As of the same year the median housing price is $50,400, a 15% increase from 2000's number. As of 2011 the most expensive house in South Park listed on HAR.com, a Houston real estate website, was a remodeled 1955 three bedroom house listed for less than $78,000; by January 12 of the year, the house's price was reduced in order to attract potential homeowners. Katharine Shilcutt of the Houston Press said that "abandoned businesses, junked-out cars and empty houses crest the landscape" of Martin Luther King Boulevard.

The housing in South Park includes many small two bedroom houses. Most of them have cedar shank siding, while more expensive houses have aluminum siding. When South Park was newly built, hamburger stands were located throughout the neighborhood including one that offered "secret sauce". Other major features included Palm Center, a shopping center, and King Center Twin Drive-In, a two screen movie theater, which was open from 1952 to 1981. The area also had family-owned businesses and Boy Scout troops. Very few liquor stores or pawn shops were present. Shilcutt said that the schools, churches and the Scout troops, reflected "the rock solid nature of the residents."

Many of the streets are named after World War II military events, such as Bataan, Dunkirk, Iwo Jima, and Kassarine Pass. One name, Remagen, was misspelled as "Remagan" on the Houston street name. Tony Gelat, an engineer, made attempts to make the city government change the name. As of 1997 they have not been successful.

== Crime ==
Katharine Shilcutt of the Houston Press said "South Park became the stuff of legend as it almost cannibalized itself in the '80s and '90s with violent robberies and drive-by shootings."

Crime was not originally a factor in South Park. Dave Straughan, a former sergeant of the Houston Police Department's robbery division who served his rookie beat in South Park, said that several factors caused South Park to decline as a neighborhood, with the decline beginning in 1971. Straughn stated that many Whites were very fearful of racial integration, so they very quickly left the neighborhood when African Americans moved in. The neighborhood began to receive residents who were poorer than the ones they replaced. The houses began to age and required increasing maintenance, of which the newer low-income residents generally would not be able to afford. Straughn also cited South Park's proximity to Telephone Road, which he said "had a national reputation for being pretty wild."

Shilcutt said that, by the late 1980s, South Park "was dominated by drive-by shootings and drug dealers, especially along Burger Park's street: Martin Luther King Jr. [sic] Boulevard." Shilcutt said that many South Park residents did not attend the area's Neighborhood Nights Out as they were too afraid to leave their homes. Shilcutt added that "Violence pervaded the entire community. Deaths grew increasingly random and senseless." Ralph Gonzales, a former resident quoted by Shilcutt, said "In the '80s and '90s, it was bad. HPD was chasing guys up and down Bellfort and MLK. Folks were knocking over liquor stores, hijacking people."

Between January 1990 and December 1991 16 people had been killed along MLK Boulevard. Chuck Philips of the Los Angeles Times said in 1993 that South Park was "a tough Houston ghetto dominated by drug-dealing, prostitution and gang warfare-where automatic rifles can be purchased almost as easily as rap cassettes." In 1993 Ronald Ray Howard, a convicted killer and drug dealer, said, in the words of Houston Chronicle reporter Roy Bragg, that South Park was "a war zone, a place of nightly shootings, fistfights, police harassment and strife. There, the right amount of money could buy any weapon, even hand grenades. Seven-year-old children knew how to handle pistols."

Gonzales said that the South Park criminal element imploded because the criminals depleted the wealth that was left in the neighborhood. According to Gonzales, the criminals moved to Alief and the Hiram Clarke area. In 2011 Gonzales said "Pickins is slim" in South Park. In 2005 Lori Rodriguez of the Houston Chronicle said that South Park had an obvious drug dealer presence.

== Culture ==
A ten block section of Martin Luther King Boulevard/South Park Boulevard, since the 1970s and by 2001, became a cruising scene, with cruising habitually occurring on Sunday evenings. On Sunday nights, within a three to four hour periods, speeds of automobiles were at 15 to 20 miles per hour, with about 2,000 to 4,000 people traveling through the ten blocks. Friends socialized and rap music played in the area. Most of the participants were black youth.

In 2001 police officers attempted to stifle the scene by flooding the 10 block stretch with water. The police said that businesses had wanted the crowds to be dissipated. After black activists protested, C. O. Bradford, the chief of the Houston Police Department, apologized. The following weekend, the cruising scene had reappeared. Thirty-two police officers were on the street, and traffic cones and barricades manipulated the vehicle traffic. Peggy O'Hare of the Houston Chronicle said "It worked reasonably well, taking only five minutes to travel the 10-block area with restricted lane use." Because some police patrols appeared, some activists argued that the police were discriminating against African-American people and not giving proportionate attention to white partygoers in the Richmond Strip. Lt. S.K. Boyce. of the Houston Police Department stated that they made more arrests in the Richmond Strip than on MLK Boulevard, and most of those arrested were White. Quanell X said that he supported the police using a different crowd control tactics on MLK Boulevard. Some business owners supported the cruising scene, while some opposed the scene.

== Education ==
As of 2011 55% of South Park's residents have graduated from high school. Katharine Shilcutt said that the low rate is explained by an increasing number of immigrants and the "disappointing graduation rates" at Jones High School and Sterling High School.

=== Public schools ===
Original owners of the property which is now known as Candy Stripe Academy were Frank and Joyce Gonzales. The original structure has been demolished and the new building now faces Martin Luther King Blvd (Formally Southpark Blvd).

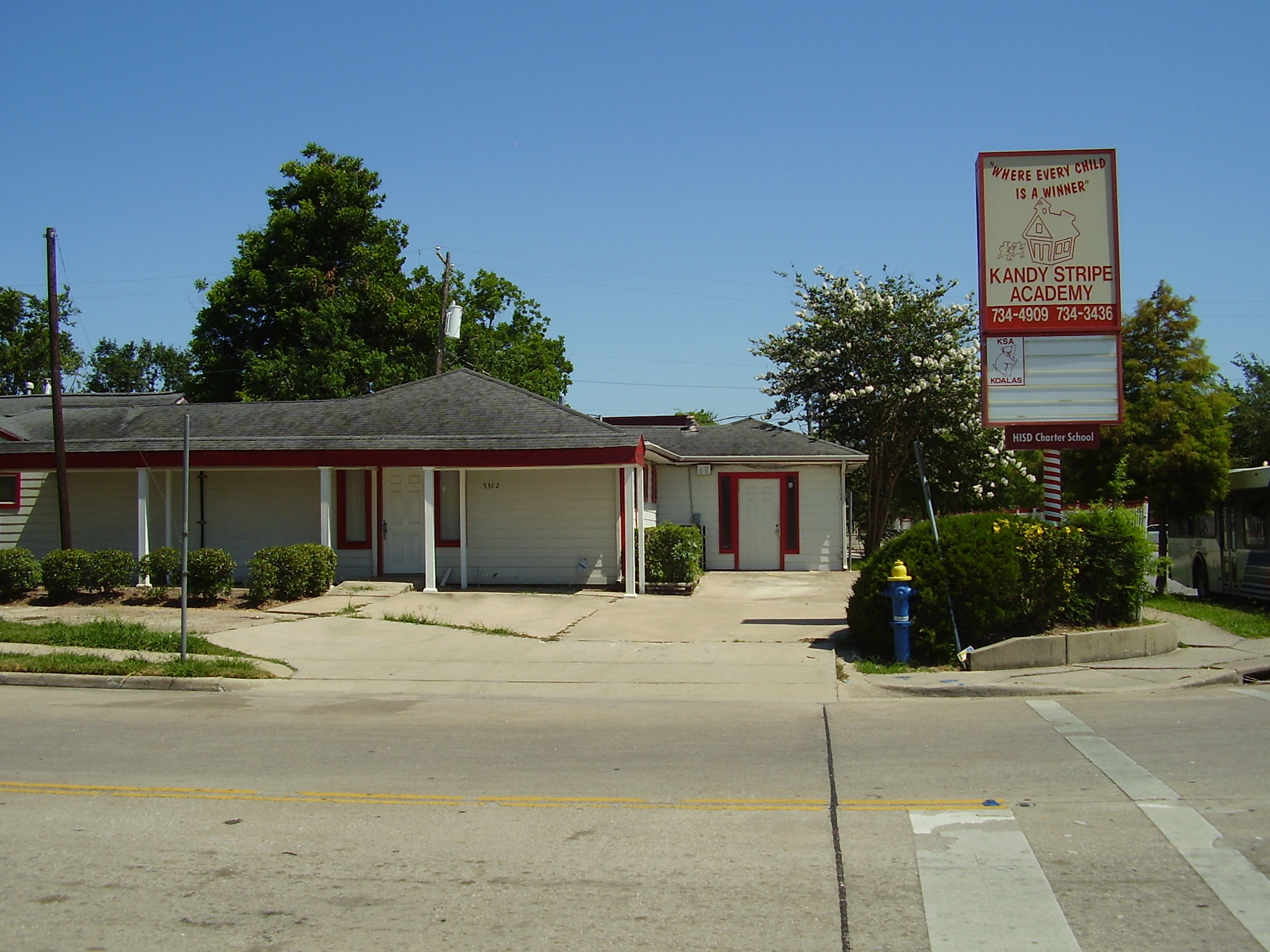
Kandy Stripe Academy

South Park children are zoned to schools in the Houston Independent School District. The community is within Trustee District IV, represented by Paula M. Harris as of 2008.

Elementary schools serving sections of South Park include Alcott, Bastian, and Kelso. All residents of the South Park subdivision are zoned to Attucks Middle School. Residents east of Martin Luther King Boulevard are zoned to Sterling High School while other residents are zoned to Worthing High School. The Jones Futures Academy, formerly Jones High School, is an alternative secondary school in South Park.

Sterling, Worthing, and Jones serve the larger South Park area. In 2007 a study determined that 60% of the entering first year classes at Jones and Sterling advanced to their fourth year, and a portion of those students graduated. Because of this, the Associated Press and Johns Hopkins University labeled Jones and Sterling "dropout factories." The study stated that over half of the high school students zoned to Jones and Worthing instead chose to attend other HISD schools.

Kandy Stripe Academy, an early education to 8th grade HISD-affiliated charter school, is in the subdivision. Jesse Jackson Academy, a state charter school, is located north of South Park, inside the 610 Loop.

On Thursday March 13, 2014, the HISD board voted 6-3 to keep the Jones campus open and convert it into an alternative career readiness school for students throughout HISD. At that time Jones was no longer be a zoned school, and its athletics programs were discontinued. Residents east of Martin Luther King Boulevard were rezoned to Sterling, and residents west of MLK were rezoned to Worthing, both for the 2014-2015 school year.

==== Private schools ====
A Kindergarten through 5 Roman Catholic school called St. Philip Neri School, of the Roman Catholic Archdiocese of Galveston-Houston, was in the area. It closed Spring 2009. The school was consolidated with St. Peter the Apostle Middle School.

=== Public libraries ===
The area is served by the Young Neighborhood Library of the Houston Public Library, which is located north of 610 in Palm Center.

== Government and infrastructure ==
South Park is in Houston City Council District D.

Houston Fire Department operates Fire Station 35 South Park, a part of Fire District 46. The station was originally built at Holmes at South Park. The station had to move due to the construction of Interstate 610. The current station near Martin Luther King Boulevard and Van Fleet opened in 1965.

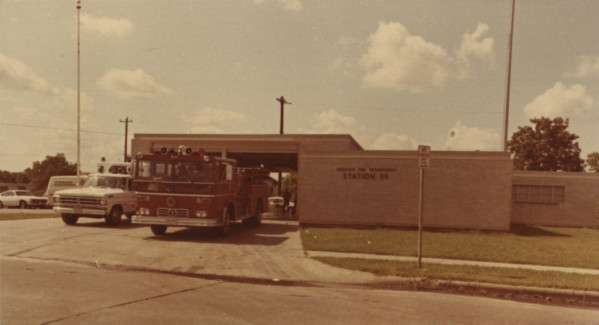
Fire Station 35, 1976

The neighborhood is within the Houston Police Department's Southeast Patrol Division, headquartered at 8300 Mykawa.

The Harris Health System (formerly Harris County Hospital District) designated the Martin Luther King Health Center in southeast Houston for the ZIP code 77033. The designated public hospital is Ben Taub General Hospital in the Texas Medical Center.

The Mayor of South Park is Cynthia Pharms

== Parks ==
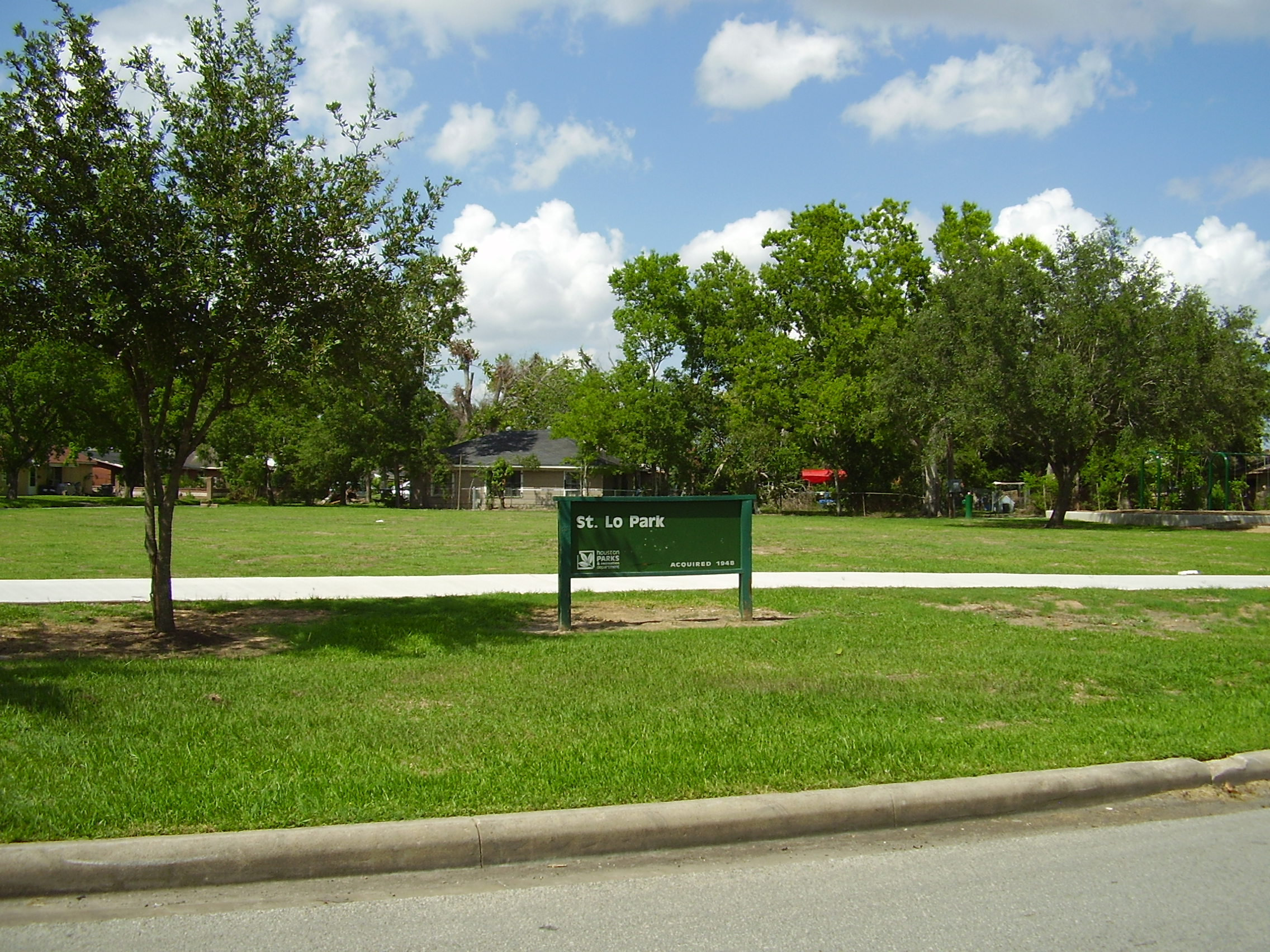
St. Lo Park

St. Lo Park is located at 7335 St. Lo Road. Pershing Park is located at 5500 Pershing/St Lo Road.

== Notable residents ==
- Megan Thee Stallion, a rapper and songwriter from the Dead End neighborhood of South Park, lived there until 14 when she moved to nearby Pearland.
- Carlos Coy (South Park Mexican), a Mexican-American rapper who is currently in prison, convicted of sexual assault.
- Clyde Drexler (basketball player)
- Brad Jordan (Scarface), a member of the Geto Boys From South Acres Region of Houston TX
- JoBeth Williams (actress)
- Lil' Keke, a rapper from the Herschelwood region of South Park
- Ganksta NIP, a rapper from the South Park Coalition
- Booker T, Professional wrestler
- Robert Wilson, former NFL player
- Dre Murray, a rapper currently signed to Collision Records
- Corey Paul, a rapper currently signed to Collision Records
- Travis Scott

== See also ==
- List of Houston neighborhoods
- The South Park Psycho
