= Houston A+ Challenge =

Houston A+ Challenge, now Texas A+ Challenge, is a not-for-profit public-private partnership based in Houston, Texas.

The organization's mission is to serve "as a catalyst for change in the public schools that educate nine of every ten children in the Houston region, teaming with principals and teachers in targeted schools to ensure that every student is prepared for post-secondary success."

On September 9, 2022, Houston A+ Challenge merged with CHILDREN AT RISK and has been renamed Texas A+ Challenge.

== History ==
Texas A+ Challenge began in January 1997 with the receipt of a five-year, $20 million grant from the Annenberg Foundation's "Challenge to the Nation to Reform Public Schools." Local funds were raised to match the Annenberg grant one-for-two, resulting in a total of $60 million available over five years. After the initial Annenberg grant expired in December 2002, the Annenberg Foundation awarded another $20 million to Texas A+ and the Brown Foundation gave an additional $10 million to continue the work for five more years. Coupled with $12 million from the Carnegie Corporation of New York and the Bill and Melinda Gates Foundation, as well as a long list of other donors, Texas A+ has raised more than $100 million, in total. In 2005, the Charity Navigator awarded Texas A+ Challenge a 4 star overall rating and they have continually received exceptional ratings for organizational efficiency.

== Initiatives ==
Through the years, Texas A+ Challenge has been involved in many different initiatives, all aimed at improving academic achievement of students in Houston-area public schools.

Their High Schools initiative was dedicated to reforming Houston's High Schools by assisting in the creation of innovative high schools and a pair of programs directly focused on impacting high school redesign. The initiative aims to prepare students for post-secondary school success in college or the workplace in tomorrow's fast-paced, high-tech, global world. Texas A+ played an important role in establishing three new Houston-area high schools, all of which are part of Houston Independent School District:

- Challenge Early College High School
- Houston Academy for International Studies
- Empowerment College Preparatory

Texas A+ is also involved in two regional high school programs:

- High School Redesign Regional Network
- Houston Schools for a New Society

The Higher Education initiative is committed to building bridges between all levels of education, from elementary school all the way to college (P-16). It seeks to transform teacher preparation programs through university, school, and community partnerships.

The K-5 Fine Arts initiative seeks to integrate fine arts into the teaching of core subjects such as math, science, and language arts at the elementary school level.

With the K-5 Math initiative, Texas A+ Challenge has teamed up with Houston ISD and ExxonMobil Foundation to foster teacher understanding of mathematics in pursuit of improved student achievement. Within the scope of this initiative, Texas A+ Challenge partners with Reasoning Mind to bring an internationally recognized, technology-based math curriculum to fifth grade classrooms.

Texas A+ Challenge tries to transform teachers and school administrators into more effective leaders to help guide their schools toward success through their Leadership initiative. They provide school leaders with knowledge and skills to develop effective leadership and foster professional growth. Training programs include:

- New Visions in Leadership Academy
- Critical Friends Group

It also includes opportunities to promote leadership through public forums and funding opportunities.

- Taking the Next Steps Program
- National Speakers Series
- Annual Fondren Reforming Schools Summer Institute
- Teacher as Researcher Grants

The Network Schools initiative have sought ways to bring schools together as professional support communities, as well as facilitating grant money.
