= South Early College High School =

Coordinates: 29.674725°N 95.340819°W

- 1930 Airport Blvd Houston Houston, TX 77051

Information
- Type: College preparatory high school
- Established: 2005, August 2016
- School district: Houston Independent School District
- Principal: Angelica Vega
- Teaching staff: 22.21 (FTE)
- Enrollment: 416 (2023-2024)
- Student to teacher ratio: 18.73
- Communities served: Houston, Texas
- Website: sechs.houstonisd.org

South Early College High School (SECHS), formerly Empowerment South Early College High School and Empowerment College Preparatory High School, is a college-preparatory high school in Houston, Texas, US. It is a part of the Houston Independent School District. It was previously located on the campus of Albert Thomas Middle School and then at Jones High School

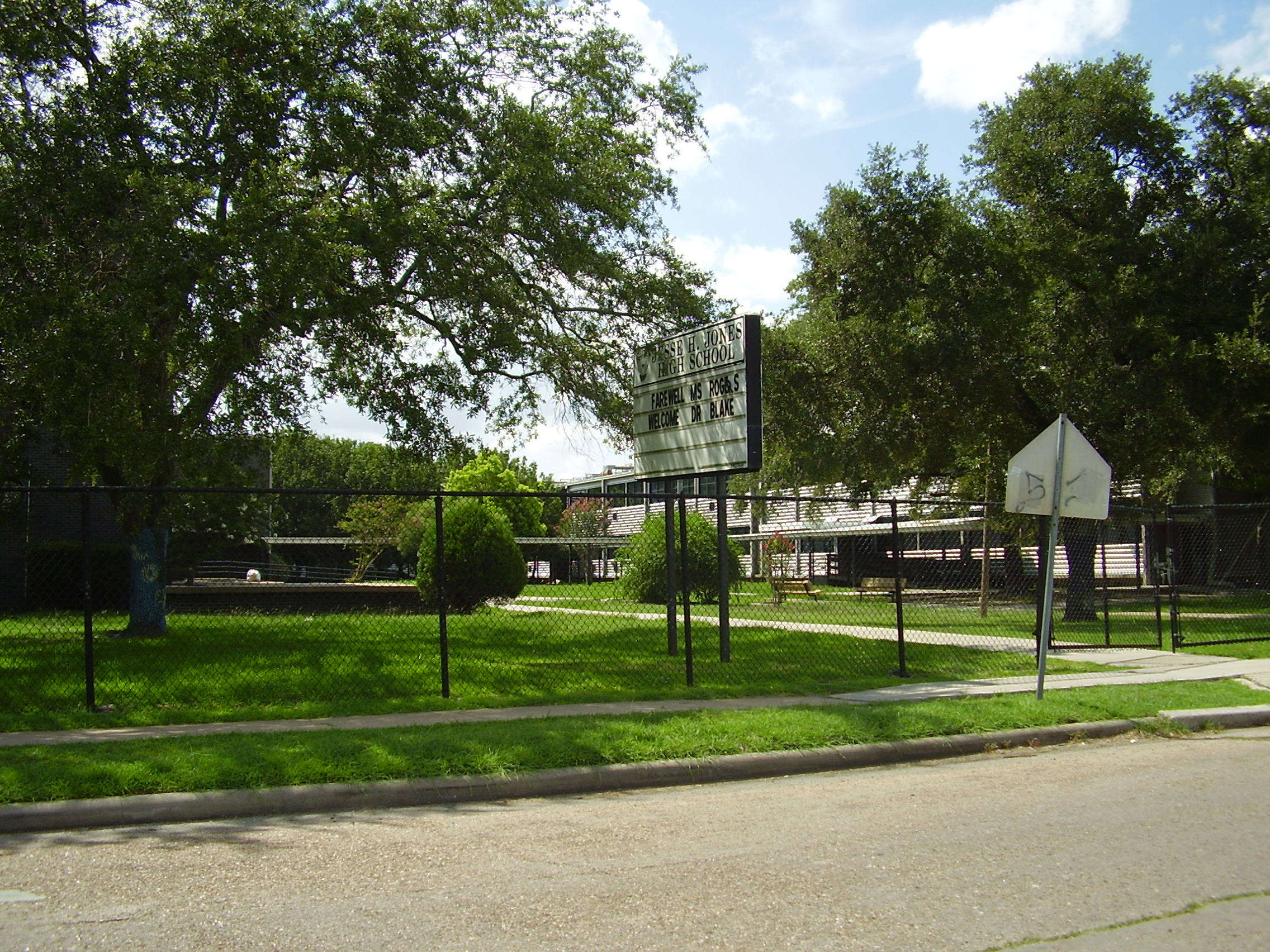
Jones High School, where South Early College Prep was once located

The school opened in August 2005. Empowerment merged with South Early College High School in 2010.

Its current location, at 1930 Airport Boulevard, is on the South Campus of Houston Community College began construction in 2014 and opened in August 2016.

The school offers its students the opportunity to earn an associate degree while concurrently achieving a high school degree.

== See also ==
- Houston A+ Challenge
