= Challenge Early College High School =

Secondary school in Houston, Texas, USA

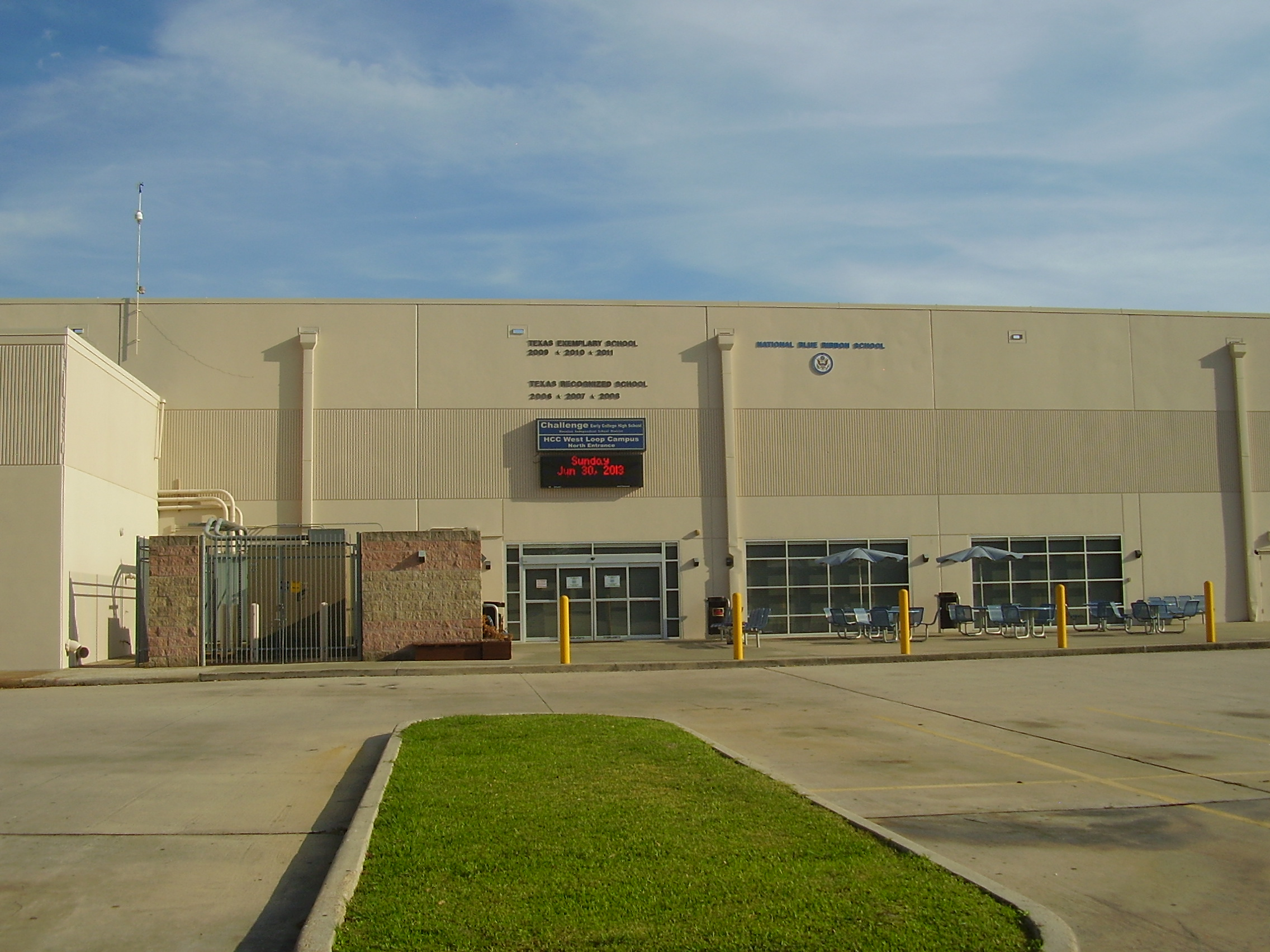
- The entrance to Challenge Early College High School, which also serves as the Houston Community College West Loop Center's north entrance

Location
- Houston Community College, Houston, Texas, USA 29.721°N 95.457°W

Information
- Other name: Challenge Early College; Challenge High School
- Type: Secondary school
- Motto: A School of Opportunity
- Established: August 2003
- Founders: Houston Independent School District; Houston A+ Challenge; Houston Community College
- School district: Houston Independent School District
- Grades: 9-12
- Website: cechs.houstonisd.org

Challenge Early College High School (also known as Challenge Early College, Challenge High School, or CECHS) is a secondary school on the Houston Community College West Loop Campus in Houston. The school handles grades nine through twelve and is a part of the Houston Independent School District.

The school's principal, as of 2022, is Jose R. Santos. Its motto is "A School of Opportunity."

The school does not automatically take in students from the area; students from the area around the school are zoned to Bellaire High School and Lamar High School. Challenge High School has roughly 450 students, with an incoming freshmen class of 125-130 students each year.

Located on the Houston Community College West Loop Center Campus, Challenge Early College High School includes a four-year program (grades 9 through 12) that allows a student to graduate with a high school diploma and an associate degree, as opposed to the traditional four-year high school which allows students to graduate with only a high school diploma. The school integrates college curriculum and courses with high school courses, allowing students to gain "dual credits" — high school as well as college credit. The curriculum is advanced. It helps students achieve their goals of being college graduates.

Challenge has received many awards and recognition, including the U.S. Department of Education's Blue Ribbon School of Excellence award in 2011 and 2018.

== History ==
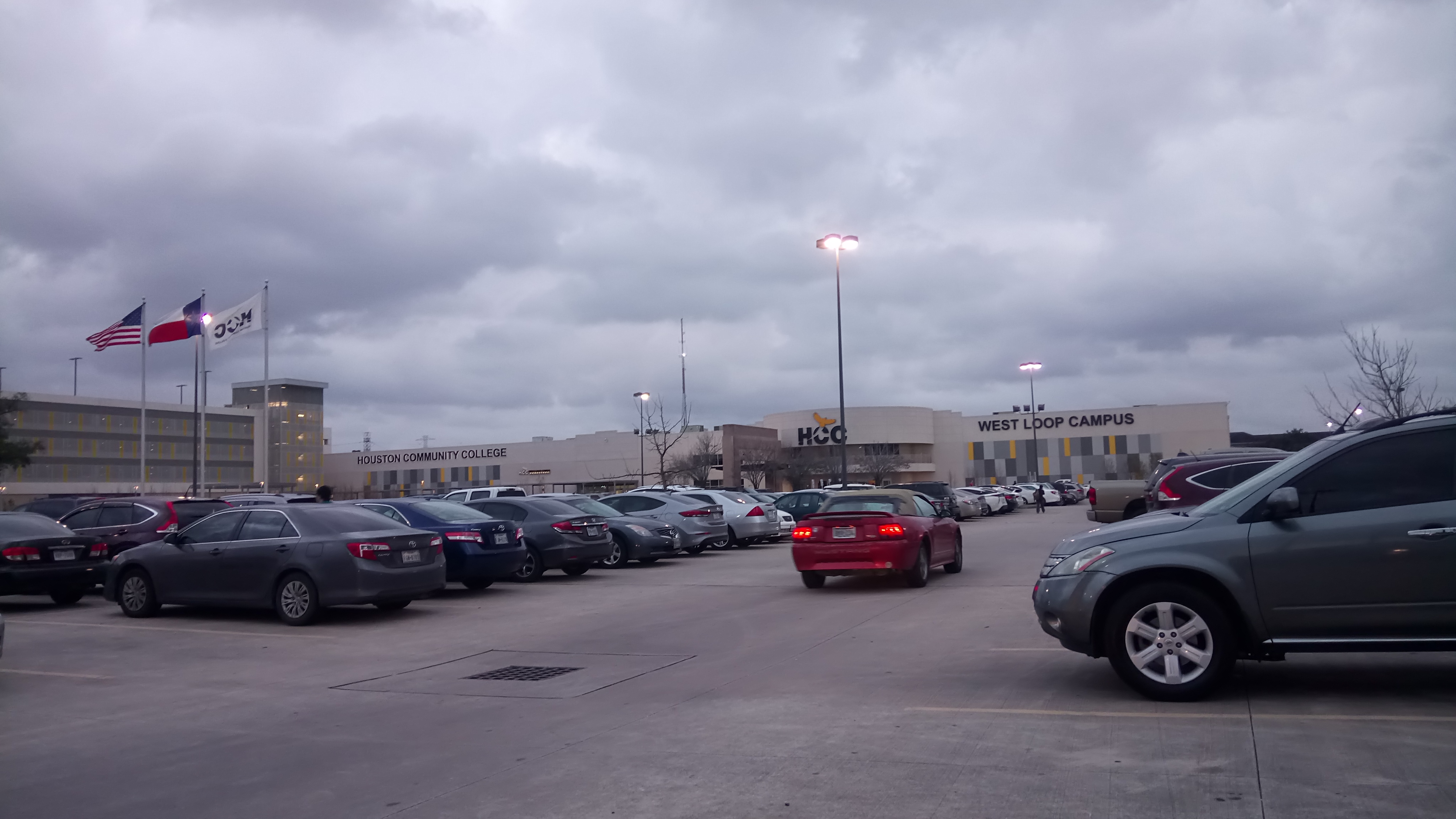
The front entrance to the Houston Community College West Loop Center

The building that houses Challenge was built in 1993 and served as an Incredible Universe electronic store. The store closed in 1997. The building remained an empty warehouse until 2005, when conversion to a college building began.

Challenge Early College High School opened in August 2003 as a partnership of Houston ISD, Houston A+ Challenge and Houston Community College. From August 2003 to May 2005, the high school was in a series of temporary buildings outside the Houston Community College campus. In August 2005, the doors opened to the newly constructed high school at Houston Community College. The first class to graduate was the class of 2005.

Freshman students are not eligible to take college courses in the summer, whereas sophomores who have a GPA of 3.0 and are passing all core classes are allowed to take college classes in the summer.

== Awards and recognition ==
- Children At-Risk 2016 #5 in the Greater Houston Area
- 2016 U.S. News & World Report Best High Schools, #78 in the USA
- 2016 The Washington Post #86, America’s Most Challenging High Schools
- 2015 Newsweek's Top High School
- 2015 Texas Honor Circle Award for Fiscal Management
- 2014-15 TEA “Reward School” (top 5% in the state for performance)

== Location ==
Challenge Early College is at 5601 West Loop South, Houston, TX 77081. It is across the street from Houston ISD's Pin Oak Middle School, which is in the city of Bellaire.

The entrance of Challenge faces Home Depot, in the city of Houston.

== See also ==
- Houston A+ Challenge
- Houston Independent School District
- Early college high school
- Houston Community College System
