= Carnegie Vanguard High School =

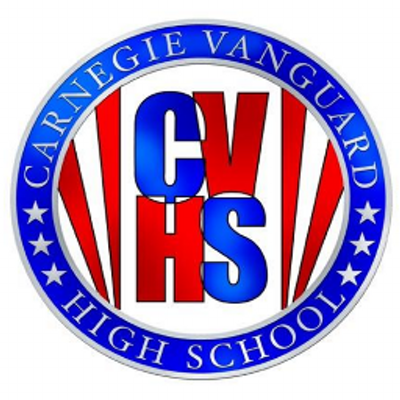

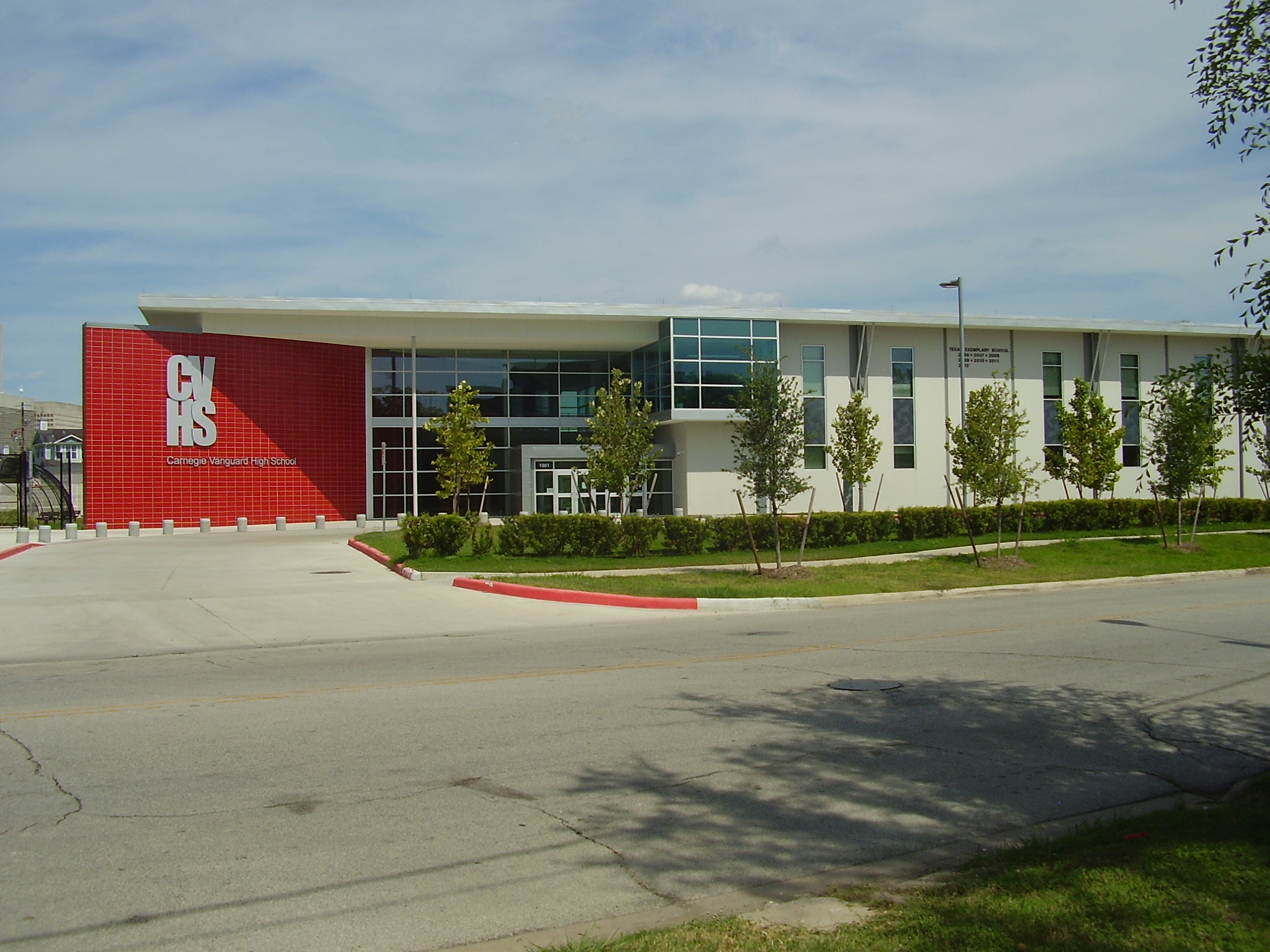

Location
- 1501 Taft Street; Houston, Texas 77019; United States; 29.754°N 95.3855°W

Information
- Type: Public Magnet School
- Opened: 2002
- School district: Houston Independent School District
- Area trustee: Diana Dávila
- CEEB code: 443541
- Principal: Ramon Moss
- Staff: 35 (FTE)
- Grades: 9-12
- Enrollment: 824 (2023-21)
- Student to teacher ratio: 21.38
- Schedule: All Classes Mon, Tue, Fri; Block Schedule Wed, Thu
- Colors: Red, White, & Blue
- Sports: Limited
- Mascot: Rhino
- USNWR ranking: No. 31 (2024)
- Information: No Uniform
- Website: carnegie.houstonisd.org

Andrew Carnegie Vanguard High School, named after Andrew Carnegie, is located in the Fourth Ward of Houston, Texas near Downtown and was formerly located in Sunnyside. The school serves grades 9-12 and is part of the Houston Independent School District. It is the only High School Vanguard Program in HISD, meaning that all students are labelled as gifted and talented by testing and the school has students take all Advanced Placement core classes as part of its curriculum.

== History ==
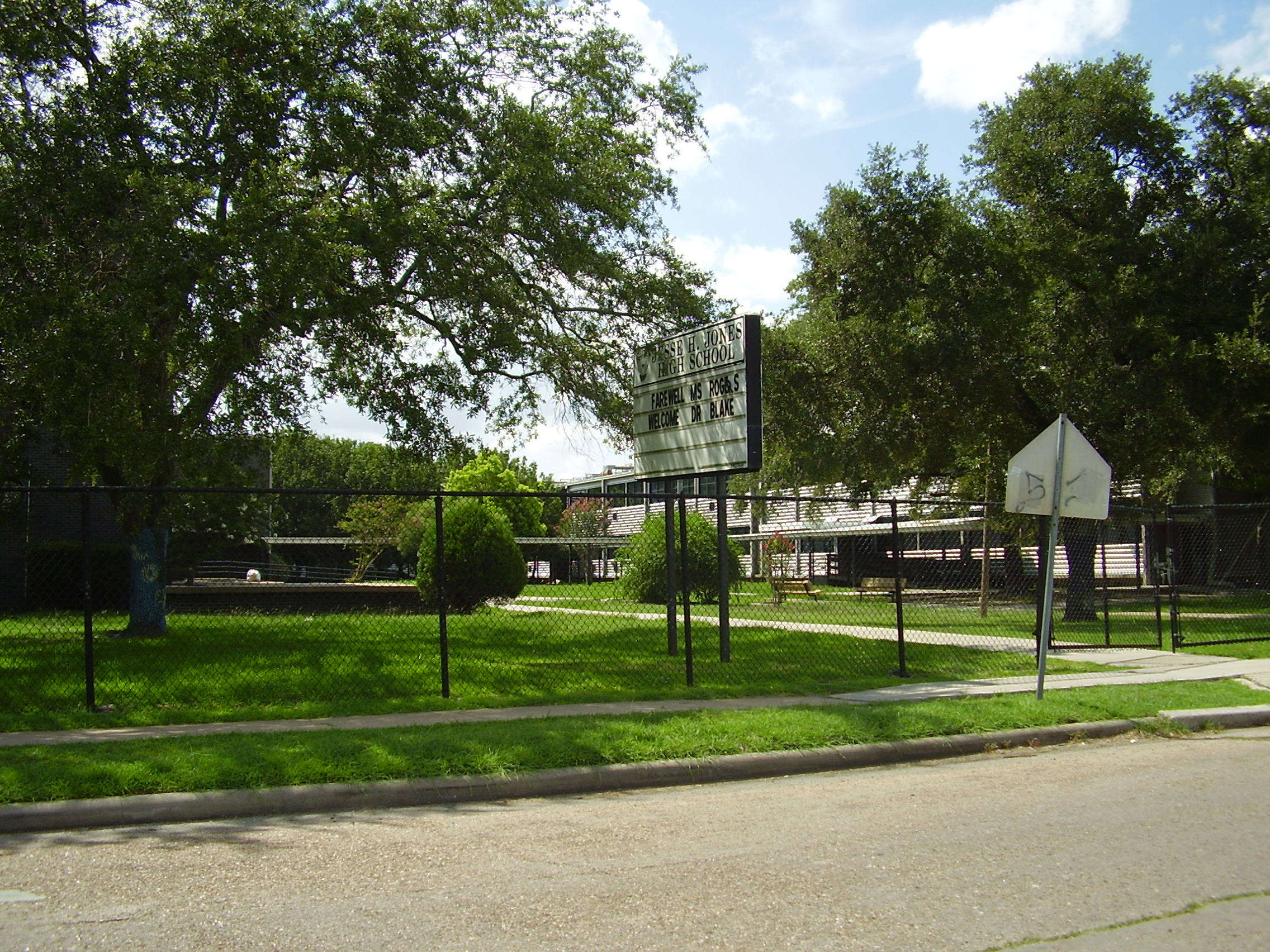
Jones High School, the former home of the HISD Vanguard program

=== Jones High School ===
The HISD Vanguard program was designed to serve the needs of gifted and talented students. From fall 1977 to spring 2002, the HISD High School Vanguard Program was a separate program located at Jesse Jones High School. It is one of the many Magnet schools in HISD designed to attract a diverse ethnicity of students by former HISD Superintendent Billy Regan.

=== Move to Sunnyside Campus ===
The reinstatement of Lawrence Allen, the Jones HS principal, who was put in charge of the comprehensive program at Jones, prompted the HISD Vanguard program separation.

Carnegie Vanguard High School opened in August 2002 in the former Carnegie Elementary School building on Scott Street and Airport Boulevard near the Sunnyside neighborhood. Carnegie began its first year as a separate school (2002–2003) with 173 students. The elementary school students who attended Carnegie Elementary were moved to Woodson Middle School, which became the Woodson K-8 School; Woodson now has only elementary grades.

In November 2008, HISD proposed to rebuild Carnegie and Worthing and have the two schools share the same cafeteria. Parents at Worthing accepted the proposal while parents at Carnegie asked for the proposal to be discontinued due to high violence levels at Worthing. On December 4, 2008, Abelardo Saavedra, the HISD superintendent at the time, shelved plans for Carnegie and Worthing to share cafeterias as the proposal had insufficient support from the board of trustees.

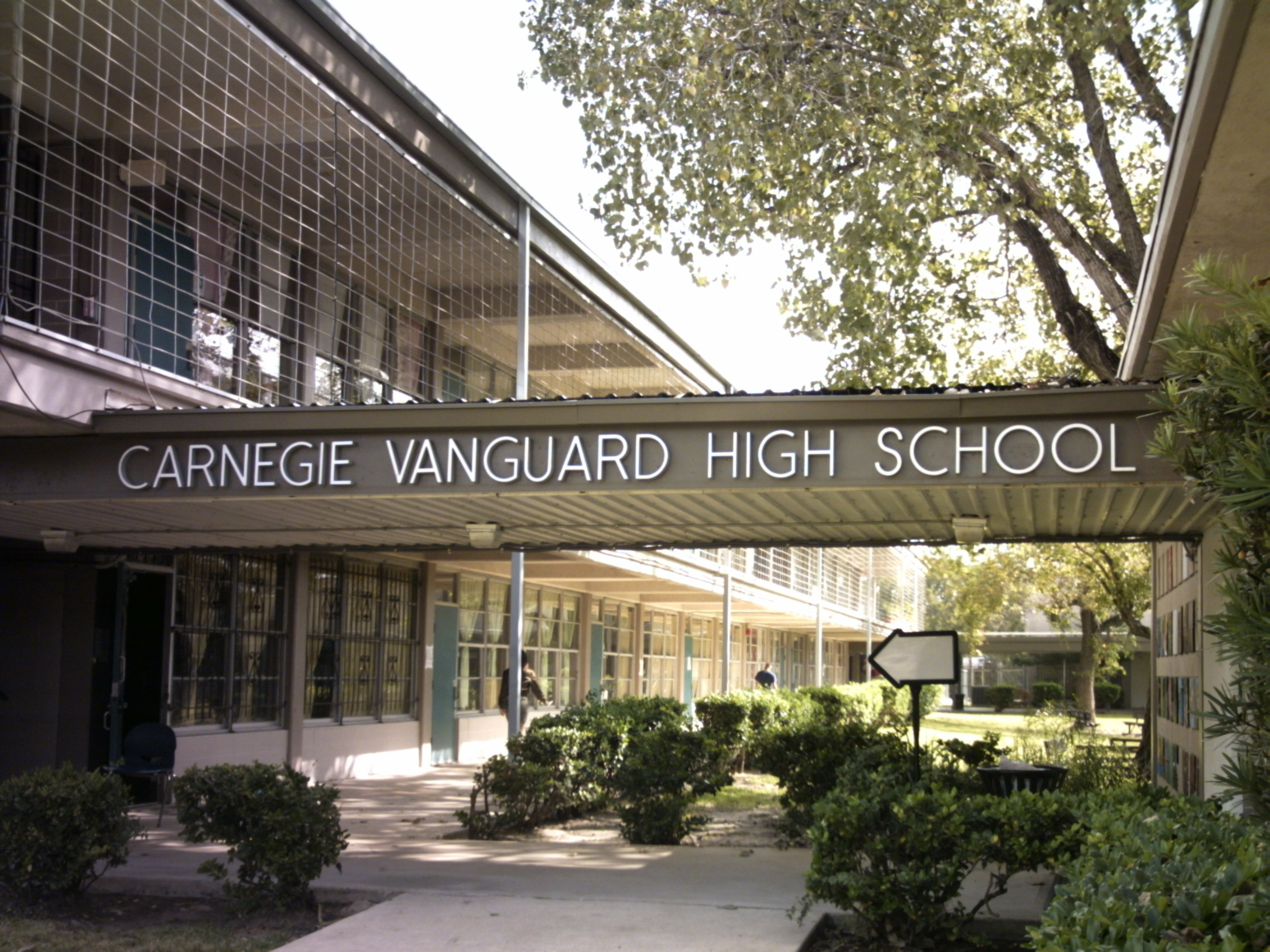
Carnegie Vanguard High School old campus

=== Fourth Ward campus move ===
In 2009, HISD administration proposed relocating Carnegie to the Fourth Ward. District administrators favored the move because students come from across the school district, and the central location would make transportation easier. During that year the school board approved of the plan. The former Sunnyside Campus has been used for military tactical training by multiple agencies, including the United States Army.

Groundbreaking occurred in May 2011. The current campus opened in August 2012.

== Campus ==
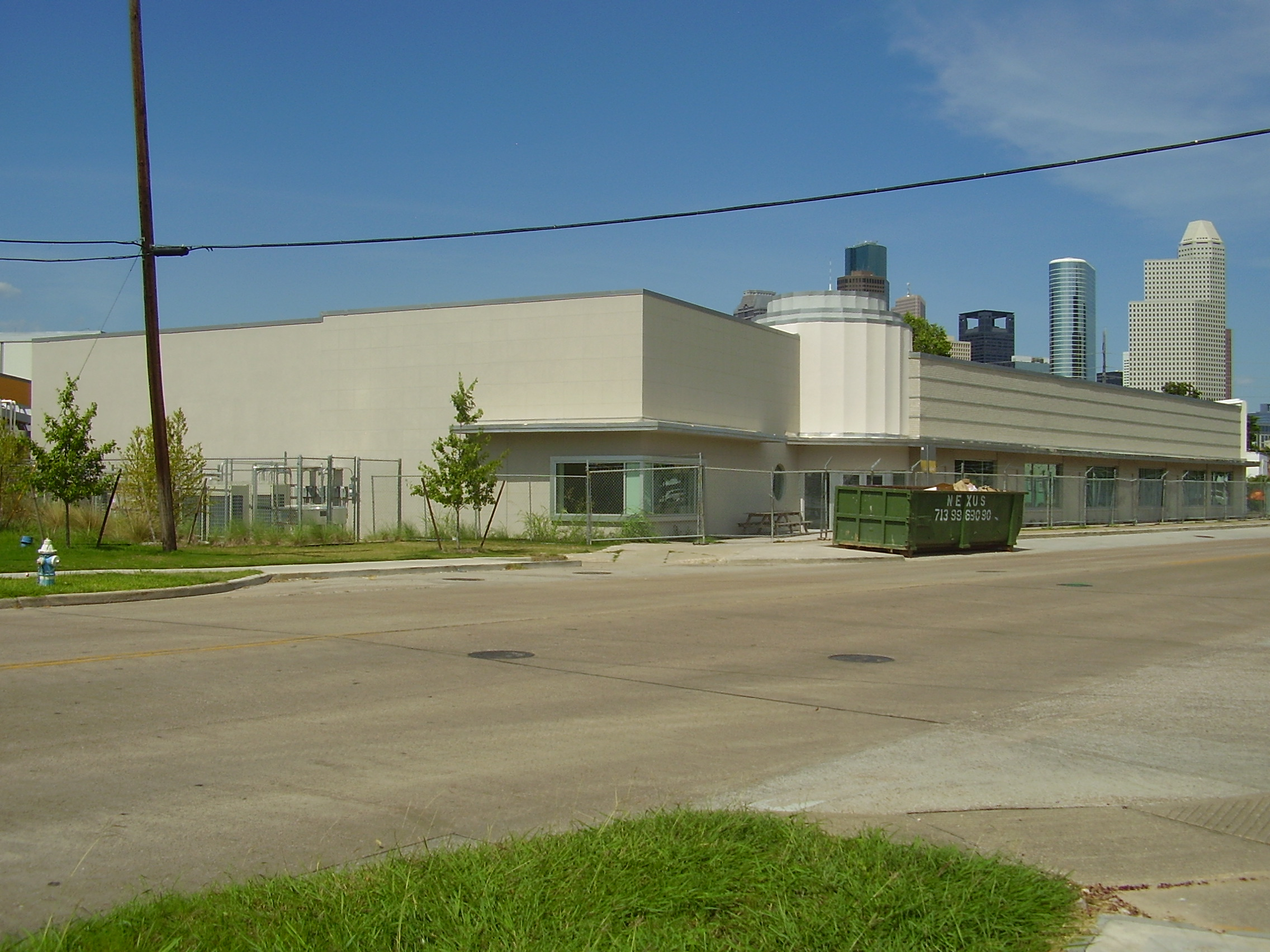
The theater is a former Orange Crush bottling plant.

=== Current Fourth Ward Campus ===
The current campus is located in the Fourth Ward, Houston. It is in proximity to Downtown, and to Midtown. HISD provides school bus transportation to students who live more than two miles away from the school. The new campus is located on a 6-acre (2.4 ha) plot at the northeast corner of West Gray Street and Taft Street. The new building can house up to 750 students. Parents, staff members, and students provided input for the design of the new CVHS campus. The building committee lobbied for a central courtyard, which is a part of the school's culture. The new building shares its site with the Gregory Lincoln Education Center. The district had initially intended for a new campus of the High School for Performing and Visual Arts to be built at the site that is occupied by the new Carnegie. Rey de la Reza Architects, Inc. developed the current Carnegie campus. The theater building is a former Orange Crush bottling plant and is one of the few remaining Art Deco buildings in Houston. The HISD bond did not cover the Orange Crush renovation.

=== Previous Sunnyside Campus ===
The previous Carnegie campus was located in the former Carnegie Elementary School building off of Scott Street and Airport Boulevard near the Sunnyside neighborhood. The former Carnegie Elementary building had about 42,500 square feet (3,950 m^{2}) of space, including the exterior corridors. The old campus was located adjacent to a horse pasture. Lisa Gray of the Houston Chronicle said that the "shabby" campus was "far not only from most of its students' homes, but also from most Houstonians' consciousness." Gray also said that "By accident, the old elementary school's layout promoted the kind of effortless mixing that the latest designs for offices and research facilities strive to encourage."

== Academics ==
=== Classes ===
Carnegie Vanguard offers only Pre-Advanced Placement (Pre-AP) and Advanced Placement (AP) courses in English, Math, Science, and Social Studies as well as Honors elective courses in core subject areas. The curriculum for every course is written to go above and beyond state and district standards. Carnegie Vanguard courses move at a quicker pace, cover more material, and are project based. They rely heavily on discussion and seminar style delivery of course information and the use, interpretation, and delivery of research.

Each Carnegie Vanguard student is required to take at least 10 AP courses before graduation: AP English Language and Composition, AP English Literature and Composition, AP Capstone {Seminar and Research}, AP Physics 1, AP Human Geography, AP World History, AP US History, AP Economics, and AP US Government and Politics. Students can potentially take up to 18 Advanced Placement classes if desired.

=== Rankings ===
For the past several years, Carnegie Vanguard has been consistently ranked as a top 30 public high school in the country by several major magazines and journals, including Newsweek, The Washington Post, and U.S. News & World Report.

	2013	2014	2015	2017	2018
Washington Post	17	23	6		N/A
U.S. News & World Report	28		143	8	15
Newsweek	13	11	9		N/A

=== Standardized testing ===
Carnegie scores the highest scores on the SAT and PSAT on the Critical Reading Section and Mathematics Section in HISD, just beating Debakey High School.

== Admissions ==
The school capacity is 750 students. About 185 spots are available for incoming ninth grade students and a small number of spots are available for incoming tenth graders. CVHS is not a zoned school so students in the immediate neighborhood are not automatically accepted. There are no admission spots for 11th and 12th graders. Carnegie has an admission rate of about 13% and receives over 1500 applications for less than 200 seats every year.

The Carnegie application process segregates students by whether or not they are Gifted and Talented (G/T) in HISD. Students not already identified as G/T in HISD or attending a private school must take a test to see if they are G/T and provide other academic information while qualified HISD G/T don't need to provide anything more.

Qualified applications are placed into a lottery to see if they will be accepted. Students that are poorer and/or minority do receive more preference in the lottery. The school automatically accepts qualified students who have siblings that currently are in the ninth through eleventh grade at Carnegie, given there is enough space.

Carnegie has no formal feeder patterns as it is a magnet school and serves students from all over the HISD area. Carnegie attracts many students who are enrolled in private schools for middle school.

== Student body ==
=== Demographics ===
The school capacity is 826 students.

2023-2024 Ethnic Demographics:

33% Hispanic

33% Asian

19% White

11% Black

4% Other

=== College matriculation ===
100% of students that graduate from Carnegie attend a 2 or 4 year college or university. Usually most graduates chose to matriculate at the University of Houston or the University of Texas at Austin. Carnegie students have also been accepted to many prestigious and highly selective colleges including Rice University, Carnegie Mellon University, Dartmouth College, Harvard University, Yale University, University of Notre Dame, Stanford University, Bowdoin College, Wellesley College, Duke University, University of California - Berkeley, Massachusetts Institute of Technology, Spelman College, Howard University, University of California - Los Angeles, Georgia Institute of Technology, Emory University, Brown University, Columbia University, Tulane University, University of Wisconsin-Madison, Drake University, University of Virginia, University of Michigan, New York University, Washington University in St. Louis, Tufts University, University of Pennsylvania and the University of Chicago.

== Clubs ==
=== Clubs ===
Club	Description
Interact	Open Volunteering Club who hosts the Annual International Festival. It is the largest club in the school.
National Honor Society (NHS)	Application Based Club for High Achieving Students.
Robotics	Open Club competing in both VEX and FIRST Robotics competitions. Students have regularly reached the world championships for the Vex Competition.
Women in Science and Engineering (WISE)	Open club for female students interested in STEM.
UIL Academics	Open club for educational competitions against other schools. Carnegie has won almost all local tournaments.
Environment, Community, Outdoor (ECO)	Open club for being earth-friendly and going on camping trips.
Junior State of America (JSA)	Open club for Non-Partisan Political Discussions and attendance of political conferences each semester.
Mu Alpha Theta (Math Honor Society)	Application based club for High Achieving Students in Math.
International Thespian Society (ITS)	Application based club for students interested in theater. They won the state title in UIL Theater in 2014.
Hispanic Honor Society	Application Based Club for Hispanic students or high achieving students in Spanish class.
Red Cross Club	Open club for supporting the Red Cross organization.
Swimming Downstream	Club aimed towards helping incoming freshmen better adjust to CVHS environment.

== Activities ==
=== Fish Camp ===
Fish Camp, a Carnegie Vanguard High School Tradition, is an overnight orientation camp for incoming students. Located on Lake Livingston, Fish Camp(hosted by YMCA Camp Cullen) is a way for incoming students to familiarize themselves with their future classmates. Equestrian, land, and water activities are provided for attendees, as well as the "best camp food in Texas."

=== The Upstream News ===
The Upstream News is a student-run new site for Carnegie Vanguard High School. It features informative articles on topics such as Arts & Entertainment, Sports, Opinion, and more. Ideas can be submitted for potential articles on the "About Page."

=== Carnegie Theatre Company ===
The Carnegie Theatre Company is a student-run theatre department for Carnegie Vanguard High School. It has competed in the UIL competition each year, in which it has placed at the state level numerous times.

== Athletics ==
As of 2015, Carnegie Vanguard competes in the University Interscholastic League (UIL), the public school athletic league in Texas. Students may play cross country, girls' volleyball, boys' tennis, and girls' tennis at Carnegie. In November 2015 over 730 individuals signed an online petition asking the HISD athletics director, Marmion Dambrino, to have Carnegie remain in the UIL. The HISD board will vote on whether Carnegie may continue to participate in the UIL.

The Carnegie Vanguard High School Baseball Team got their first win against rivals Chavez High School in April 2021. Their next season, also their last in the UIL 6A level of competition, they broke their previous win total record with 3 wins in their district season.

Sports	UIL	Teams	Boys	Girls	Notable achievements
Cross Country	Yes	Freshmen, Junior Varsity, and Varsity Teams per gender.	Yes	Yes	Girls Varsity Team moves to regionals in 2015 and 2016.
Volleyball	Yes	Freshman, Junior Varsity and Varsity.	Yes	Yes	Girls Varsity 3rd Place in UIL 5A Districts Fall 2022
Tennis	Yes	Consist of singles, doubles, and mixed teams.	Yes	Yes	2nd Place in UIL 6A Districts Spring 2022
Basketball	No	One team.	Yes	Yes	2017 & 2018 Magnet School Championship Winner
Soccer	Yes	One team per gender.	Yes	Yes	Girls Soccer Team competed in championship match in 2016.
Baseball	Yes	UIL Team	Yes	No	2017 Sylvester Turner Invitational Winner; 2015 Davis Invitational Winner
Track	Yes	Freshman, Junior Varsity, and Varsity Teams per gender.	Yes	No	Have produced many national competitors of the Junior Olympics
Robotics	Yes	Multiple teams.	Yes	Yes	2019 State Championship Win in VEX Robotics
Cheer	No	One team.	Yes	Yes	

== Notable alumni ==
- Anthony Obi (Fat Tony) - Rapper - Class of 2006
