= Frenchtown, Houston =

Louisiana-Creole quarter of Houston, Texas

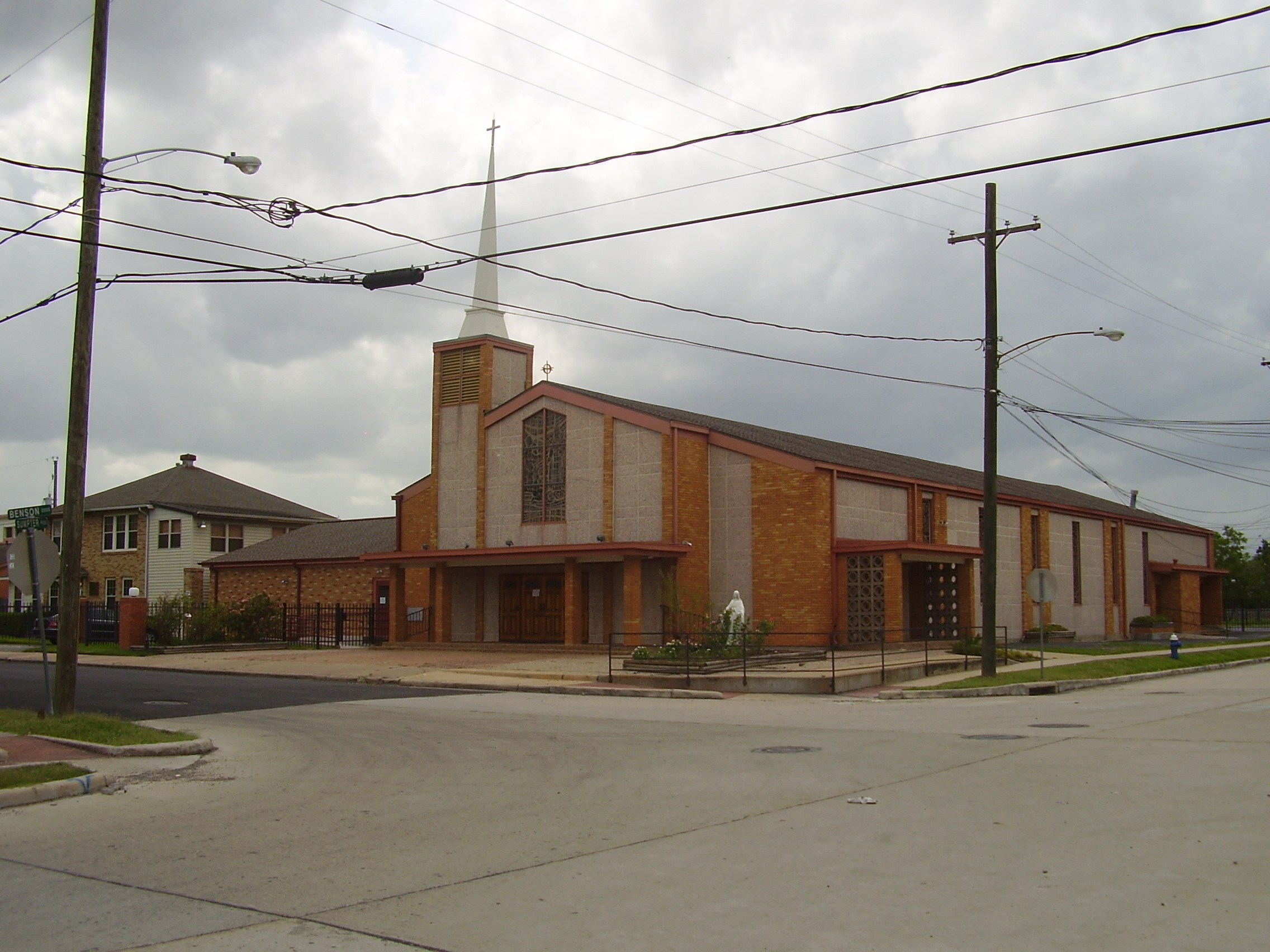
Our Mother of Mercy Catholic Church

Frenchtown is a section of the Fifth Ward in Houston, Texas. In 1922, a group of Louisiana Creoles, particularly Creoles of color, some of which were Francophones or Creole-speakers, organized Frenchtown, which contained a largely Roman Catholic and Creole culture.

== History ==
The Great Mississippi Flood of 1927 forced many Creoles to leave Louisiana, and they settled the Frenchtown area.

The Creole people brought their musical influences, and zydeco music was established in the community. They were relatively wealthy and believed in Roman Catholicism. West wrote that Frenchtown was "clannish". Around the 1950s young women from Frenchtown rarely married outside of the community, and traditionally the Creoles opposed the idea of their daughters marrying dark-skinned blacks. The Creole Knights, a social club including twelve members of the first families to move to Frenchtown, was in operation as of 1995. West called it one of the most exclusive such clubs in Houston.

The community was about four square blocks. The Our Mother of Mercy Catholic Church, completed in 1930 by Creoles for Creoles, serves as a social center for the neighborhood. The Houston Press described the Continental Zydeco Ballroom at 3101 Collingsworth as serving as the "Saturday-night focal point" for Frenchtown for several decades. Throughout its history, Frenchtown had narrow streets and a lack of sidewalks, complicating the riding of bicycles.

When new residents no longer moved to Frenchtown, the neighborhood culturally merged with the greater Fifth Ward. By 1979 several factors of change were occurring. Mexicans from Denver Harbor began moving into Frenchtown. Creole girls began marrying darker skinned black people. Older people were dying and younger people were moving out of the neighborhood.

In 2002 Mike Snyder and Matt Schwarz of the Houston Chronicle said that Frenchtown was "scarred by decades of deterioration and neglect." The neighborhood had deteriorating houses that had been abandoned for years, vacant lots with high weeds, and a malfunctioning drainage system that resulted in standing rain. Snyder and Schwartz wrote that the issues "create health and safety hazards and lend the neighborhood a bleak, desolate appearance that discourages private investment and prompts many residents to leave when they can." By that year many Frenchtown residents began to distrust city officials. Frank Broussard, the head of the Frenchtown Association, said that the neighborhood needed new streets and adequate drainage and that the vacant lots needed to be dealt with. Snyder and Schwartz also said that "what distinguishes neighborhoods such as Frenchtown is chronic problems with basic infrastructure and services that contribute to blight and often lead to declining property values and dwindling population."

== See also ==
- History of the African Americans in Houston
- Frenchy's Chicken
