= Our Mother of Mercy Catholic School =

Our Mother of Mercy Catholic School may refer to:

- Our Mother of Mercy Catholic School in Houston
- Our Mother of Mercy Catholic School (Fort Worth) in the Roman Catholic Diocese of Fort Worth
- Our Mother of Mercy Catholic School (Beaumont) in the Roman Catholic Diocese of Beaumont
