= Fifth Ward, Houston =

Neighborhood of Houston in Harris, Texas, United States

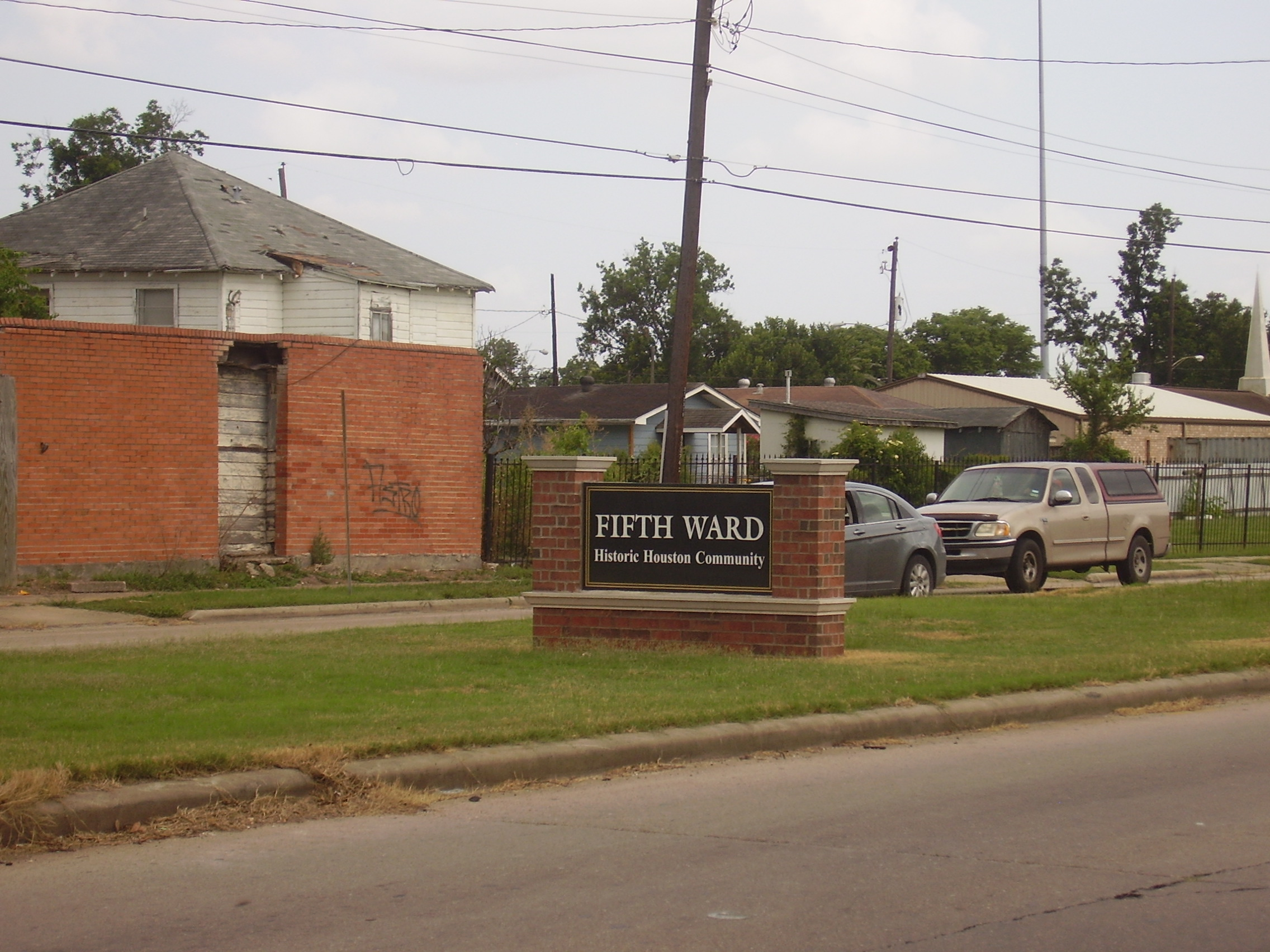
Sign indicating the Fifth Ward

The Fifth Ward, nicknamed the Nickel, is a community of Houston, Texas, United States, derived from a historical political district (ward), about 2 miles (3.2 km) northeast of Downtown. Its boundaries are Buffalo Bayou on the south, Little White Oak Bayou on the west, Collingsworth Rd on the north, and Lockwood Drive on the east.

The Fifth Ward, one of the six wards of Houston, was created partly from two other wards, the First Ward, which ceded the area to the north and east of White Oak Bayou and Little White Oak Bayou, and the Second Ward, which ceded all land within the Houston city limits to the north of Buffalo Bayou.

The ward comprises the city-designated Greater Fifth Ward Super Neighborhood. It is adjacent to Northside, Kashmere Gardens, Denver Harbor, Downtown, and Second Ward.

== History ==
=== Early history ===
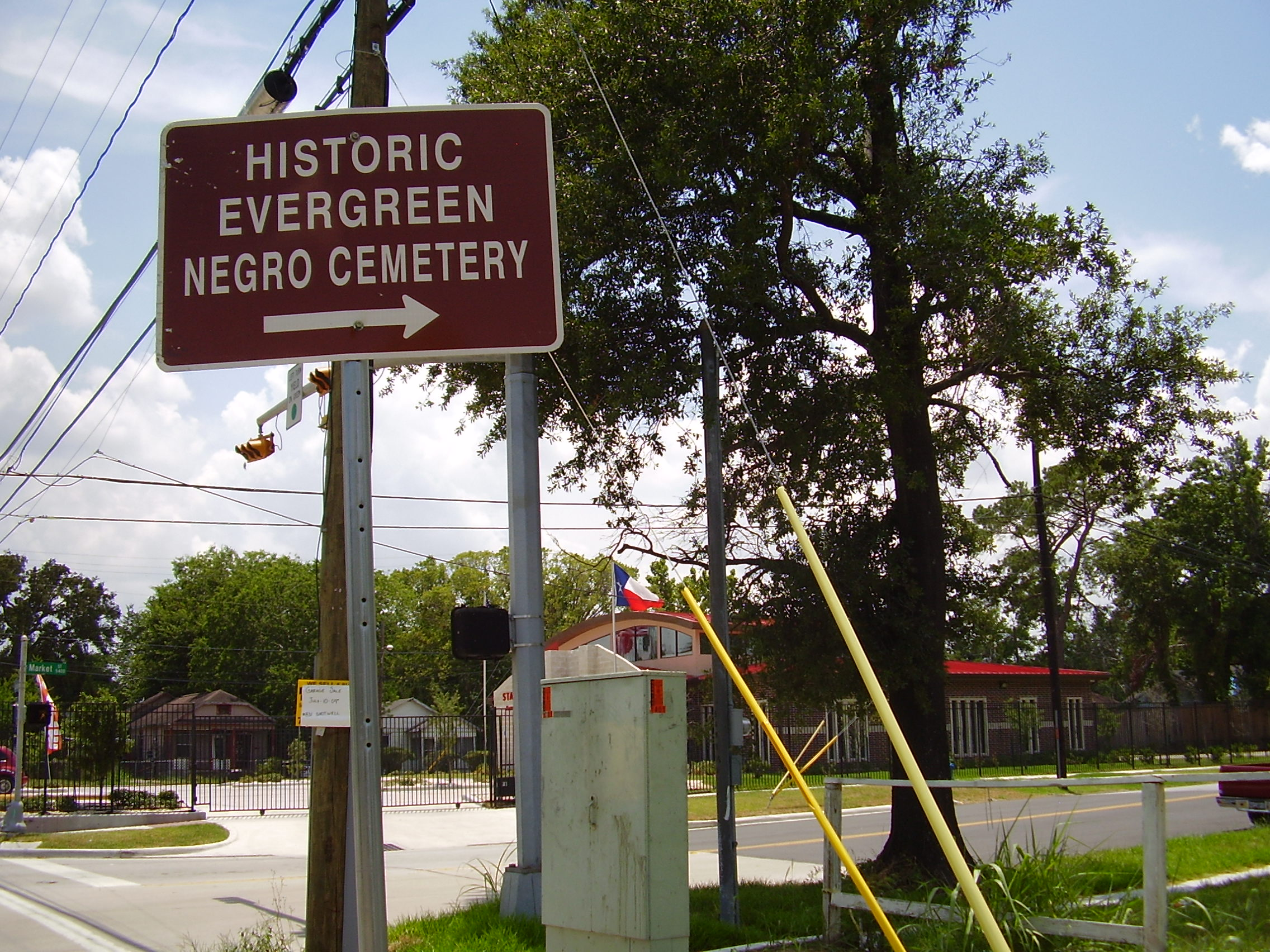
Sign pointing to the Evergreen Negro Cemetery

The Fifth Ward on a 1913 map of Houston

In its initial history, the Fifth Ward had many ethnic groups. Large numbers of the residents were Irish and Jews; the latter had fled pogroms in Russia and Eastern Europe, and lived mostly in the eastern parts, while the former lived mainly in the north. Richard West of the Texas Monthly characterized the early Fifth Ward as being "prosperous".

After the American Civil War, newly freed slaves began settling in the sparsely settled area. In 1866, it became the Fifth Ward and an alderman from the ward was elected to Houston's City Council. By the mid-1880s, it was virtually all black, home to working-class people who made their livings in Houston's east side ship channel and industrial areas or as domestics for wealthy Houstonians. Mount Vernon United Methodist Church, founded in 1865 by Reverend Emmanuel "Uncle" Toby, a former slave, is the oldest church in the ward. Five other churches are over a hundred years old. The Fifth Ward is also home to the famous "Island of Hope (Anderson Memorial Temple) COGIC" the oldest Pentecostal church in Fifth Ward. Over the years it had been home to the city's minority and immigrant population. (Note: Around the turn of the century, blacks were a decided minority among Houston’s immigrant residents, but after World War II migrations of blacks from the Deep South (mainly Louisiana), from rural Texas, and from the rapidly growing neighborhoods north and west of downtown Houston changed the area’s ethnic makeup.)

In the late 1800s the Fifth Ward community threatened to secede from the city of Houston twice, in 1875 and 1883. Complaints about inadequate municipal services, including fire and police services, lighting, sanitation, and drainage, occurred during this time period. The 1875 secession complaint asked for the paving of streets and upgrades to the utility system. The city government ameliorated the 1883 complaints by establishing a drawbridge at San Jacinto Street that crossed the Buffalo Bayou. It paved parts of Odin Avenue, now known as Lyons Avenue, in brick in the 1890s. The pavement ended two blocks after the residence of Mayor of Houston John T. Browne.

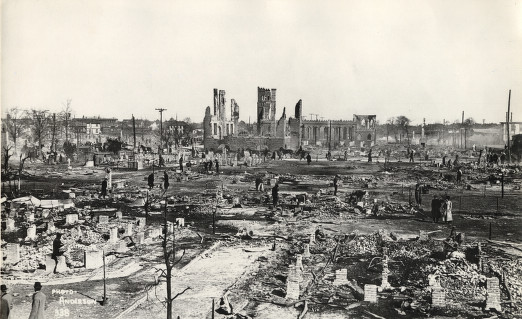
1912 Great Fifth Ward Fire aftermath

On February 21, 1912, with stiff Northern winds blowing in, the largest fire in Houston's history began. This fire became known as the "Great Fifth Ward Fire". The strong winds spread the fire as embers set wood-shingled roofs on fire. It consumed a church, school, 13 industrial plants, eight stores, and 119 homes, mostly located in the Fifth Ward. There were no deaths, but there was over $3 million in property damage.

=== Post-World War I to the mid-20th century ===
In the post-World War I period the neighborhood makeup changed as a wave of African-Americans settled the Fifth Ward. The housing density increased as families put more people in each building in order to pay their rent. The buildings, occupied by too many people, began to deteriorate. Some Jewish people remained as landlords, but most of them moved away, with many of them going to New York City, including The Bronx; and Long Island.

Before desegregation the community housed African-Americans of all occupations and income levels. The community was known as the "bloody Fifth" because of some highly publicized violent incidents in the neighborhood; Michael Berryhill of the Houston Press stated that the Fifth Ward was not as blighted in the 1940s as it was during the 1990s. Robb Walsh of the Houston Press described the 1930s era Fifth Ward as "one of the proudest black neighborhoods" in the US; more than 40 black-owned businesses were along Lyons Avenue in the Fifth Ward at that time.

In the post-World War II period a large number of black migrants, many of them from Louisiana and some from East Texas and other areas in the Deep South, settled the Fifth Ward. The community became characterized by poverty since many of these migrants were unable to get non-menial jobs.

In 1949 Brown & Root began buying land in the Fifth Ward for its headquarters.

When Interstate 10 was built, it went through the Fifth Ward, dividing the community.

The city government established some pocket parks and added pavement, gutters, and curbing to several streets in the southernmost part of the Fifth Ward in the period 1964-1974, during the term of Mayor of Houston Louie Welch.

=== 1970s and 1980s ===
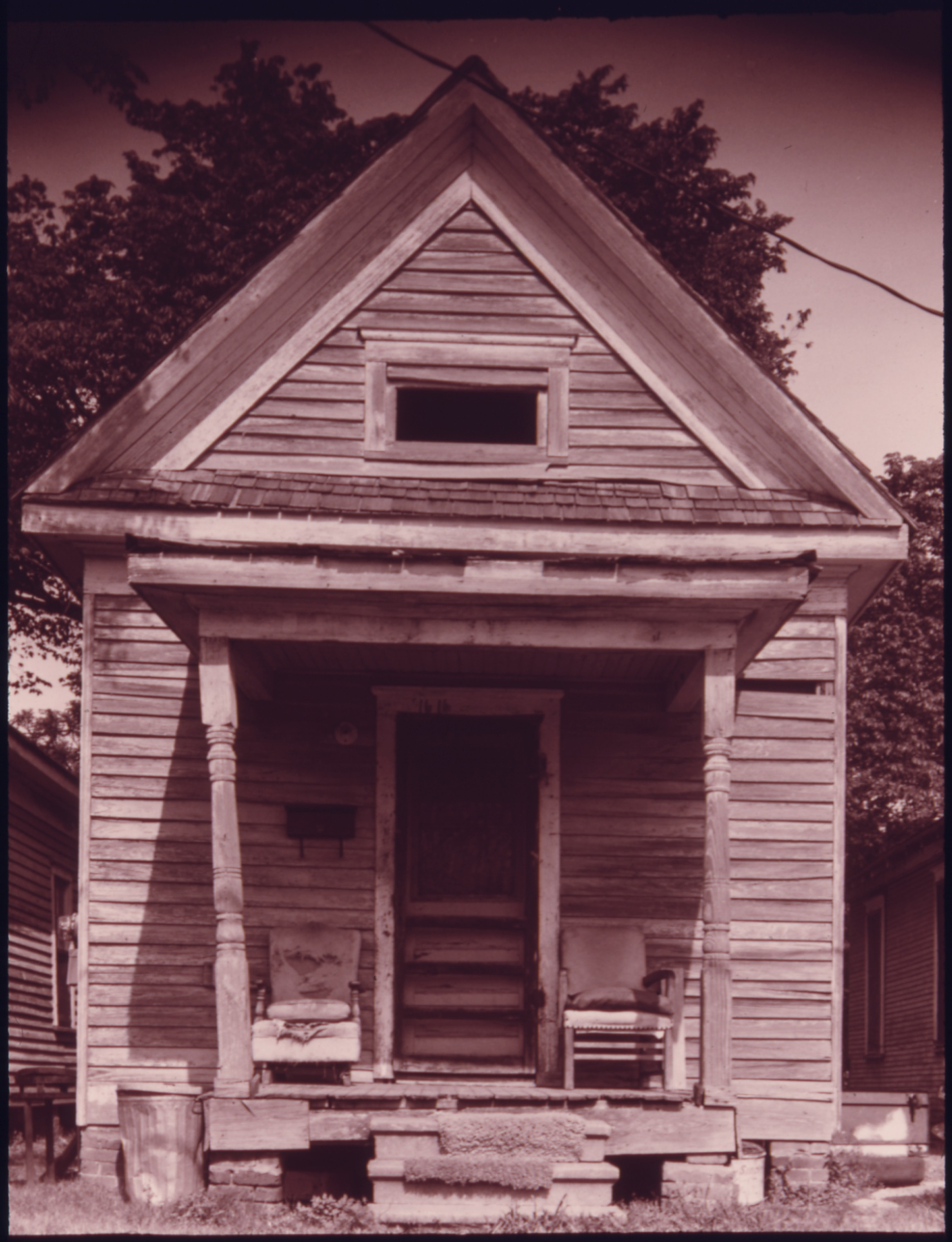
House in the Fifth Ward by Danny Lyon.

Desegregation led middle class African-Americans to move to the suburbs. By the 1970s the Fifth Ward lost a significant part of its population, and many houses were boarded-up. Many area businesses were vacant and the area had many vacant lots with overgrown plants. In 1974 Whit described the neighborhood as "one of Houston's poorest ghettos". In the 1970s and 1980s the Fifth Ward became notorious throughout Houston for the violence perpetrated in the community. Ernest McMillan, a community activist and contributor to the Fifth Ward Enrichment Program, said in a 1987 Houston Chronicle article that "One of the differences between this neighborhood and one like River Oaks is that they have lots of support and all kinds of resources available. Here in the Fifth Ward it's the exact opposite: These people have no resources at all. There's one clinic, one library, no YMCA, very few activities, and the community is very fragmented. It's not the kind of environment that helps a child excel."

As of 1979 the median income in the Fifth Ward was $5,030 ($22313.27 adjusted for inflation), 25% of Fifth Ward residents had high school diplomas, and 34% of Fifth Ward residents lived below the poverty line. The respective citywide averages were a median income of $9,876 ($43810.32 adjusted for inflation), a percentage of those with high school diplomas of 52%, and a poverty line percentage of 10%. By 1979 only a few Italian American families remained in the Fifth Ward. By that year, black flight from the Fifth Ward to Kashmere Gardens, South Park, Sunnyside, and Trinity Gardens had occurred.

West wrote in 1979 that about 90% of the Fifth Ward was characterized by "physical ugliness" and "poverty" while there are some middle class "pockets of affluence" that do not have physical indications of troubled neighborhoods. At the time the Fifth Ward was more dense in terms of population than most Houston neighborhoods. The average Fifth Ward housing density was 9.14 and there were 30.5 persons per residential acre, while Houston's citywide average density and persons per residential acre were 4.98 and 14.4, respectively. In addition, 21% of city blocks had no drainage systems, while 39% had open ditches and 40% had storm sewers. West stated that the Fifth Ward's physical character was not like that of Harlem in New York City or Roxbury in Boston. In 1974 Whit Canning of Texas Monthly stated that the Fifth Ward was characterized by a "project-type apartment complex", "narrow streets" and "small stores". West wrote that the Fifth Ward had its environment "out in the open, on the street" and that it had "more barbershops, pawnshops, churches, loose dogs, abandoned buildings, bars, broken windows" while there were "fewer sidewalks, streetlights, fire hydrants, culverts, curbs, parks, jewelers, museums, libraries, garbage trucks."

In 1970 metal manufacturer Moncrief-Lenoir Manufacturing Company planned an urban renewal project, spending $10 million to buy 20 acres (8.1 ha) of land along Lyons Avenue's western end, but nothing was built by 1979. It was scheduled to be one of the largest urban renewal projects in the United States.

=== 1990s and onward ===
Between 1990 and 2000 the Hispanic population of the Fifth Ward increased from around 19% of the population to around 31% as Hispanics in the Houston area moved into majority black neighborhoods. In the same period, the black population of the Fifth Ward declined by 3,286 as majority African-American neighborhoods in Houston had declines in their black populations.

In 2000 the median annual income was $8,900. 62% of its residents lived below the poverty line. 9 of 10 school-aged children qualified for free or reduced lunches. The commercial streets had several empty buildings and vacant lots. Lisa Gray, a journalist in the Houston Press, stated in a 2000 article that the existing businesses "run mostly to dingy mom-and-pop operations, grim little grocery stores and cheerless liquor stores. There's no McDonald's, no Fiesta, no Target, no Wal-Mart. It's turf where national chains fear to tread." Gray added that the words "new" and "nice" were not often associated with the Fifth Ward, while "at-risk," "crime," and "poverty," were. Walsh said that the Fifth Ward in 2002 was "in much better shape" than it was in the 1970s; he added that while the Fifth Ward is "hardly a garden spot," the Fifth Ward Community Redevelopment Corporation took many steps to improve the community including assisting low income borrowers in finding loans, encouraging architects to develop "innovative designs" for low income housing, and bringing commercial building projects into the Fifth Ward.

Japhet, a section of the Fifth Ward at Emile Street at Clinton Drive (two blocks east of Hirsch Road/Waco Street), was the Houston Press 2004 "Best Hidden Neighborhood." The article stated "Say the words "Fifth Ward" to most Houstonians, and they'll think crime, poverty and desperation." The article added that Japhet is "more like a village than anything else -- fragrant organic gardens are everywhere, bursting with vegetables, fruits and flowers, and the whole neighborhood comes together for a big party every full moon."

In 2007 the Fifth Ward was one of several Houston neighborhoods with a high concentration of felons. During that year a debate regarding the ownership of the historic Evergreen Negro Cemetery in the Fifth Ward continued. Some Hurricane Katrina evacuees also moved from Southwest Houston and lived in other parts of Houston such as the Fifth Ward.

In 2020 a survey concluded that 43% of area families had at least one member diagnosed with cancer. The 2020s saw the construction of a large multi-use project, East River Houston, on the former KBR corporate site on the northern bank of Buffalo Bayou, between Jensen and Hirsch Streets, continuing a trend of redevelopment of historical Fifth Ward neighborhoods closest to Downtown.

== Demographics ==
In 2015 the Greater Fifth Ward Super Neighborhood had 19,687 residents. 48% were Black, 46% were Hispanic, 4% were White, and 1% each was Asian and others. In 2000 the super neighborhood had 22,211 residents. 63% were non-Hispanic black, 35% were Hispanic, and 1% were non-Hispanic white; the percentages of non-Hispanic Asians and others were zero.

In 1870, 16% of the African Americans in Houston lived in the Fifth Ward; this rose to 21% by 1910.

== Government and infrastructure ==
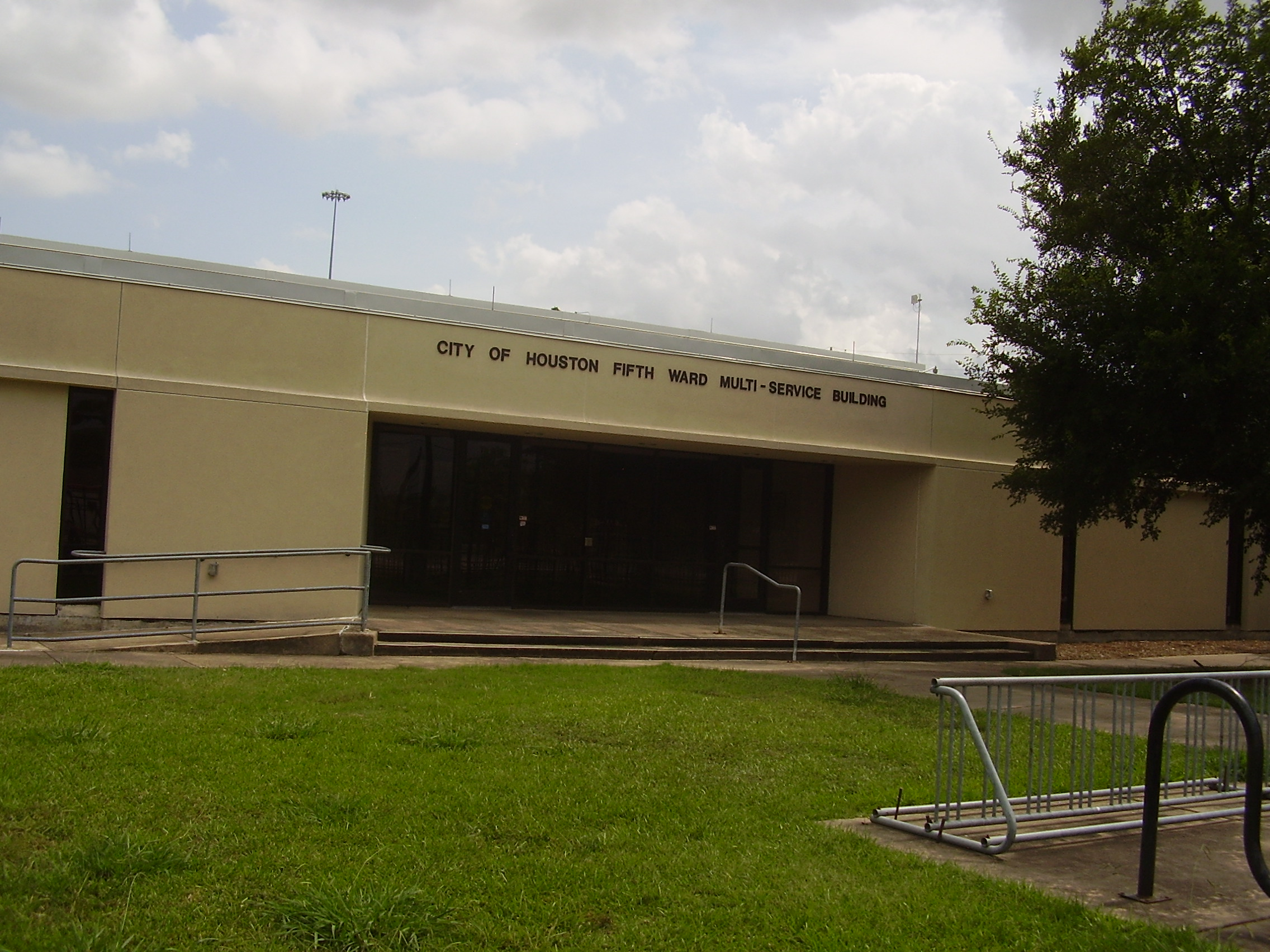
Fifth Ward Multi-Service Center

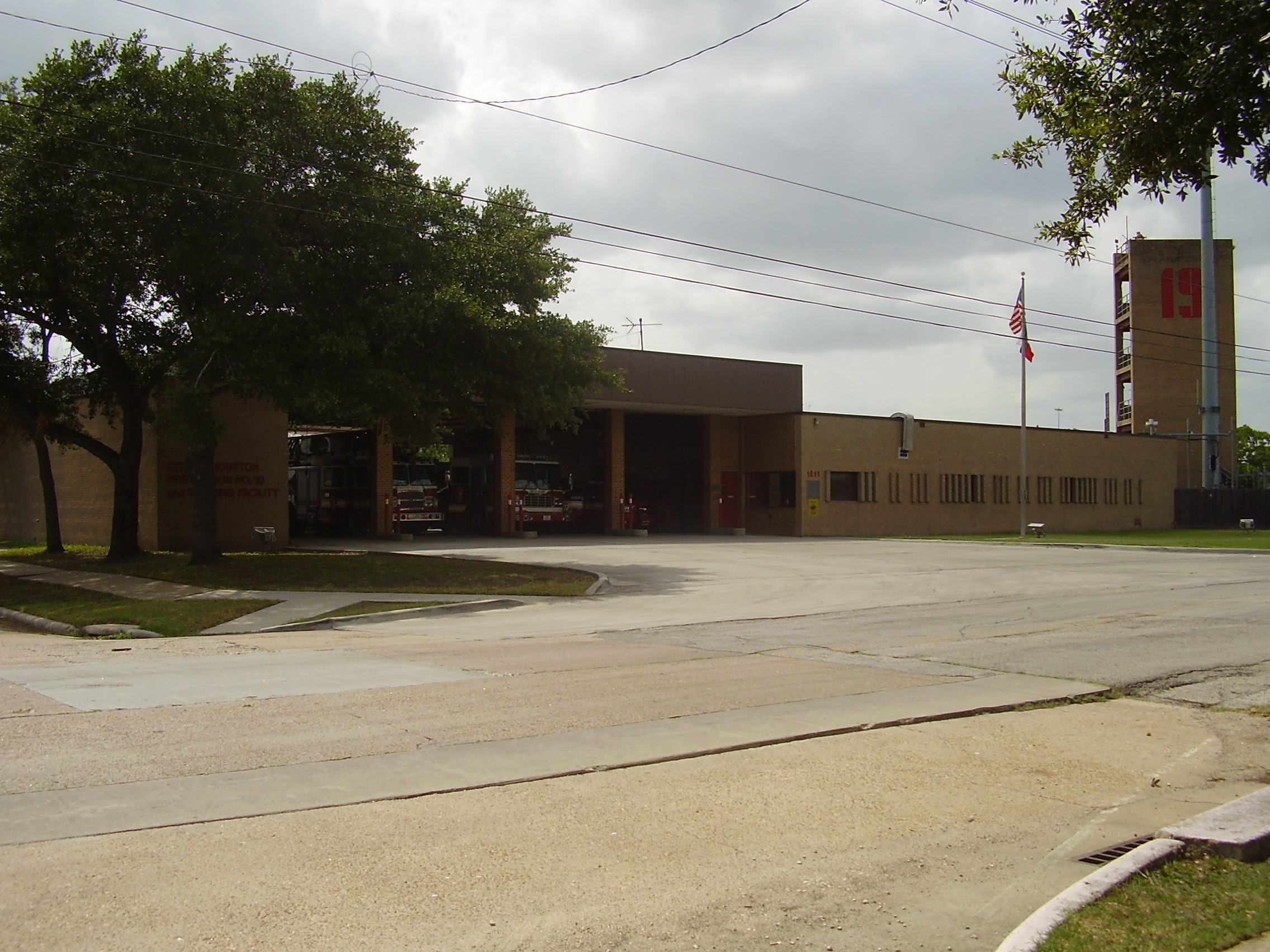
Fire Station No. 19 and Training Center

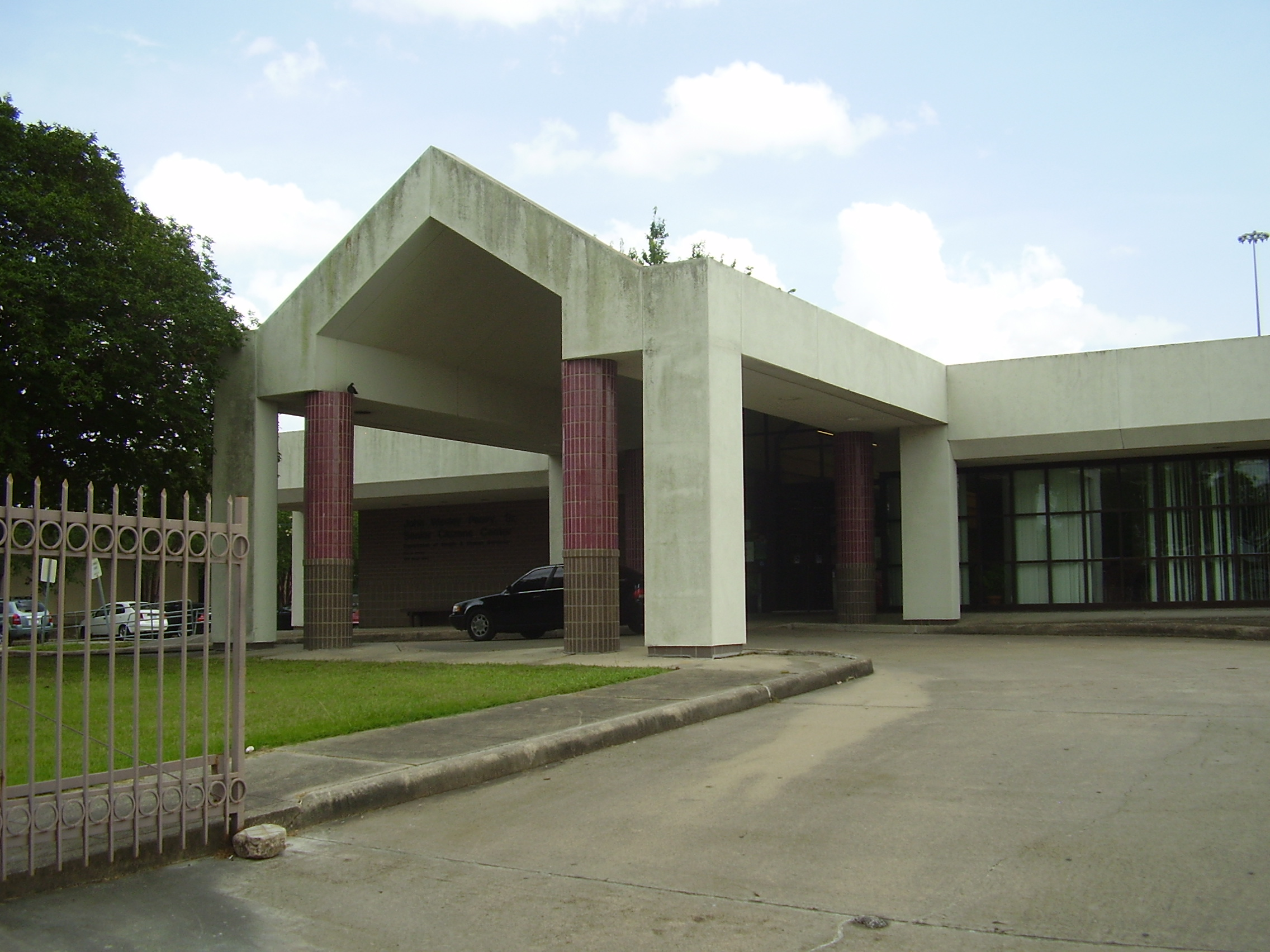
John Wesley Peavy Sr. Senior Citizens Center

Greater Fifth Ward is currently located in City Council Districts B and H. As of 2024, Tarsha Jackson represents District B and Mario Castillo Jr. represents District H. https://www.houstontx.gov/council/maps.html

The community is served by the Houston Police Department Northeast Patrol Division, headquartered at 8301 Ley Road. The Fifth Ward Storefront is located in Suite 200 at 4300 Lyons Avenue.

The Houston Fire Department operates Station 19 Fifth Ward, a part of Fire District 19, on 1811 Gregg Street. The station first opened in 1925 at the corner of Gregg and New Orleans. The current location opened in 1979 at the opposite side of the intersection. In 1979 it had the highest number of fire and ambulance, beating, cutting, dead on arrival, emergency birth and other obstetric, false alarm, sickness and shooting calls of any Houston fire station.

The Houston Bureau of Animal Regulation and Care (BARC), which operates the City of Houston municipal animal shelter, has its campus in the Fifth Ward.

The Harris Health System (formerly Harris County Hospital District) designated the Ripley Health Center for the ZIP code 77020. The designated public hospital is Ben Taub General Hospital in the Texas Medical Center.

The Houston Housing Authority (HHA) operates several public housing properties in the Fifth Ward. The include Kelly Village and Kennedy Place. Kennedy Place first opened as a 60 unit development in 1982. The HHA used $7.8 million, including some federal stimulus funds, to redevelop the housing. The demolition of the old Kennedy Place began on December 28, 2009. In January 2011 the new Kennedy Place opened, with 108 units (20 one bedroom, 58 two bedroom, 23 three bedroom, and 4 four bedroom). It also once had Kelly Court, which was the second-ever Houston housing project that admitted African-Americans.

In 2002, open ditches were the predominant form of drainage of water in the Fifth Ward.

The Fifth Ward is in Texas's 18th congressional district. Its representative as of 2026 is Christian Menefee.

=== Multi-service center and senior center ===
The city operates the Fifth Ward Multi-Service Center at 4014 Market Street, The city multi-service centers provide several services such as child care, programs for elderly residents, and rental space. in proximity to Interstate 10. The center, operated by the Houston Department of Health and Human Services, houses ten agencies, including the Fifth Ward Branch Library, American Red Cross, Harris County Juvenile Probation Program, Mayor's Citizens' Assistance Office, Neighborhood Centers Inc., and Fifth Ward Head Start. The center opened in 1977 so that various social services supporting the Fifth Ward would be located in one place. It was built for $1 million (equivalent to $5.31 million in 2025), and by 1979 it had a day care, a juvenile probation center, a housing counseling center, an employment center, a health clinic, a library, a senior citizen service center, and other services, provided by nine agencies. In 2005 the multi-service center served 65,000 people.

In a 2001 bond election voters approved an expansion and renovation of the multi-service center. On October 12, 2006 the city of Houston began the first phase of a renovation and expansion project for the center. The first phase, $3.4 million, included an addition of 16,000 square feet (1,500 m^{2}) of space to the center; the expansion would include a classroom with computers for information technology purposes, a community food pantry, a demonstration kitchen used for holding cooking classes, community meeting conference space, a community event multi-purpose room, and community program administration offices. The city scheduled completion for September 2007. The city scheduled the start of the second phase, a $2 million renovation project of the original 25,000-square-foot (2,300 m^{2}) structure, after the end of the first phase.

The Department of Health and Human Services also operates the John Wesley Peavy Sr. Senior Citizens Center, adjacent to the Multi-Service Center. It was named after John Wesley Peavy Sr., an East Texas native who served as a precinct judge in the area.

== Economy ==
West stated that possible reasons why the business climate in the Fifth Ward was poor, according to different people in the Fifth Ward, include a lack of effort to get investment from White people, the construction of freeways that cut off parts of the Fifth Ward, a lack of investment in the appearance of businesses, white persons leaving the Fifth Ward and taking capital, and the closing of the Lyons Avenue exit off of the Eastex Freeway, the eastern portion of U.S. Route 59 in Houston. West also stated that black flight contributed to the decline in Fifth Ward businesses.

As of 1979 most businesses in the Fifth Ward were personal service affairs common to other low income neighborhoods in the United States, such as pawnshops, funeral parlors, bars, barbershops, cleaners, cafes, and liquor stores. As of 1979 Mack Hanna, a black man from Houston, owned the Standard Savings Association, the only financial institution in the Fifth Ward.

In 2011 Jarvis Johnson, a member of the Houston City Council, said "The Fifth Ward is void of jobs. There aren't any commercial grocery stores. There aren't any places where young people can get a job."

=== Corporate presence ===
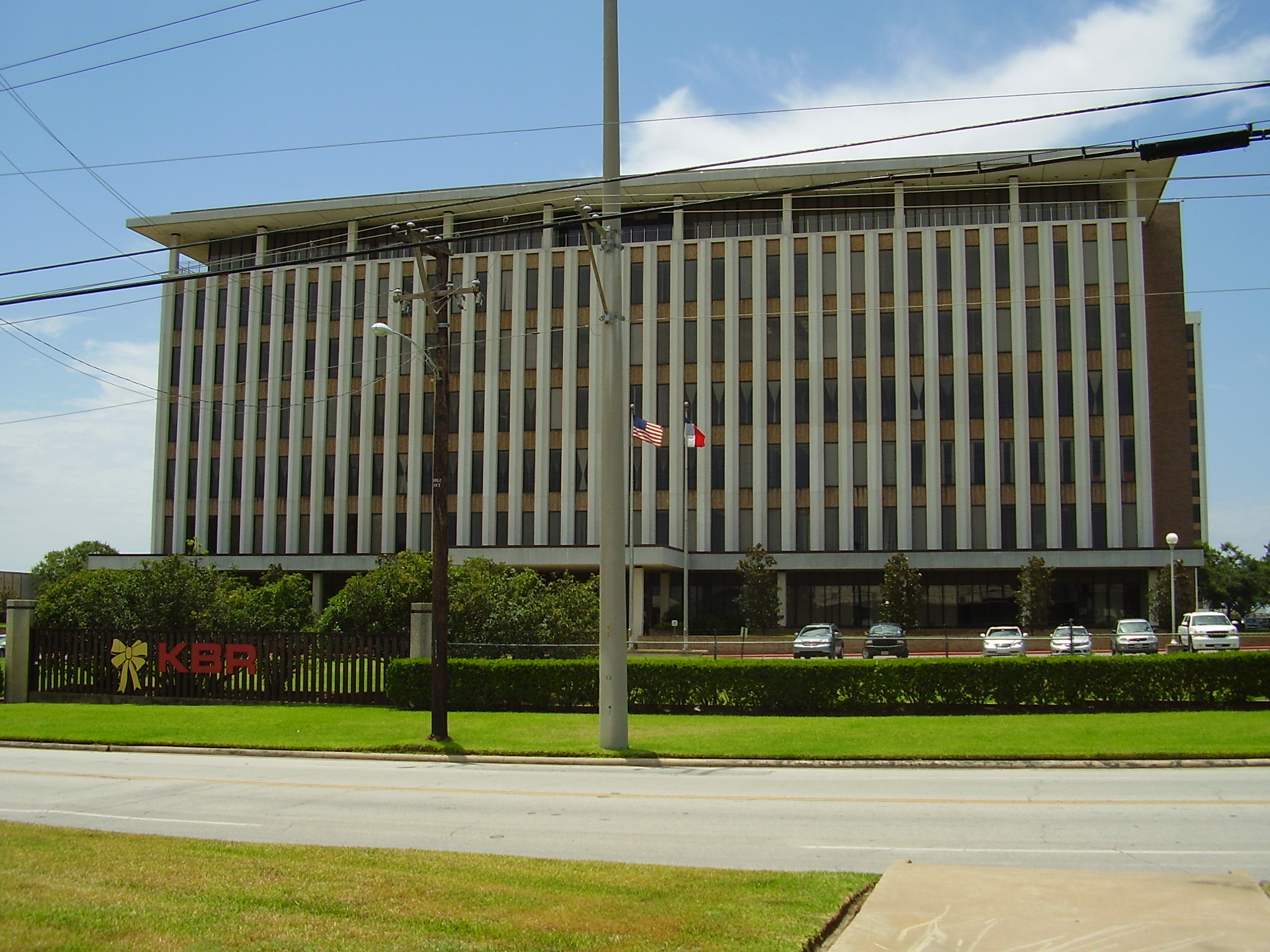
KBR offices on Clinton Drive

KBR maintained offices in a 138 acres (56 ha) campus on Clinton Drive, within the boundaries of the East End and the Fifth Ward. This property was along the Buffalo Bayou. As of December 2010 KBR no longer operates this office.

The KBR office complex was the former headquarters of Brown & Root. Brown and Root began buying land in the Fifth Ward in 1949. It initially acquired 79 acres (32 ha), then it acquired an additional 58 acres (23 ha).

By 2001 Halliburton owned the Clinton Drive campus. In August of that year Halliburton announced that it would consolidate 8,000 local employees to office space in Westchase. Halliburton planned to relocate around 2,000 employees from Clinton Drive and the industrial facilities would have been relocated to a location that was, in that month, undetermined. Sanford Criner, a principal at real estate brokerage Trione & Gordon, suggested that gentrification would turn what would have been the former Clinton Drive facility into entertainment, residential, or retail use, and that the facility would not have been redeveloped for office space usage. In December 2001 Halliburton canceled its plans to relocate employees to Westchase. Nancy Sarnoff of the Houston Business Journal said that it made more sense for the company to lease existing space instead of constructing new office space in times of economic downturns.

In 2010 KBR vacated the site, moving employees to Downtown. The company then performed environmental cleanup of the site. The KBR site is now the East River project, including homes, businesses, and a golf course. FIfth Ward residents petitioned the developer and city to "prioritize affordable housing, job opportunities, and community involvement in the planning process."

== Geography ==
Two majority-Hispanic (as of 2001) communities, Denver Harbor and Northside, are on either end of the Fifth Ward.

"Big Tree," a tree in an area where Interstate 10 and U.S. Route 59 (Eastex Freeway) now intersect, historically has been the center of activity in the Fifth Ward and was in proximity to the terminus of the streetcar line.

Lyons Avenue serves as a primary road in the Fifth Ward. In 1979 West wrote that Lyons Avenue, named after saloon owner John Lyons, served as the "Soul Street" of Houston, declaring it equivalent to 125th Street in Harlem, 47th Street in Chicago, South Street in Philadelphia, Seventh and T in Washington, D.C., Tremont Street in Boston, and Springfield Avenue in Newark, New Jersey. In the 1920s the Lyons family owned many businesses along the street, originally named Odin Avenue after the first bishop of the Roman Catholic Archdiocese of Galveston-Houston, John Mary Odin. The street received its current name in 1927. In pre-desegregation Fifth Ward, Lyons and Jensen were primary commercial avenues.

As of 1979 the intersection of Lyons Avenue and Jensen Drive was called "Pearl Harbor" due to many violent incidents occurring there.

The southern edge of the Fifth Ward, along the Buffalo Bayou, housed farms in its early history before becoming a host of slums and the city dump by the 1920s. Cleanup of this area began when Brown and Root began establishing its headquarters in the late 1940s.

The 359-acre (145 ha) Englewood Rail Yard, located in the eastern end of the Fifth Ward, is 4.5 miles (7.2 km) long. In 1979 Englewood Radar Yard was the largest rail yard in the Southern United States. The rail yard is now owned by Union Pacific Railroad, which merged with the previous owner, Southern Pacific, in 1996.

The rail yard was the location of a now-defunct wood preservation plant which is a continued source of creosote contamination to the neighborhood. This plant, as of 1979, gives a distinct odor that caused area Mexican Americans to name it el Creosote.

In 2019 the Texas Department of State Health Services conducted of a study of an area in the Fifth Ward around Lavender Street, near a creosote facility of a former rail yard, where cancer rates were higher than normal.

=== Frenchtown ===
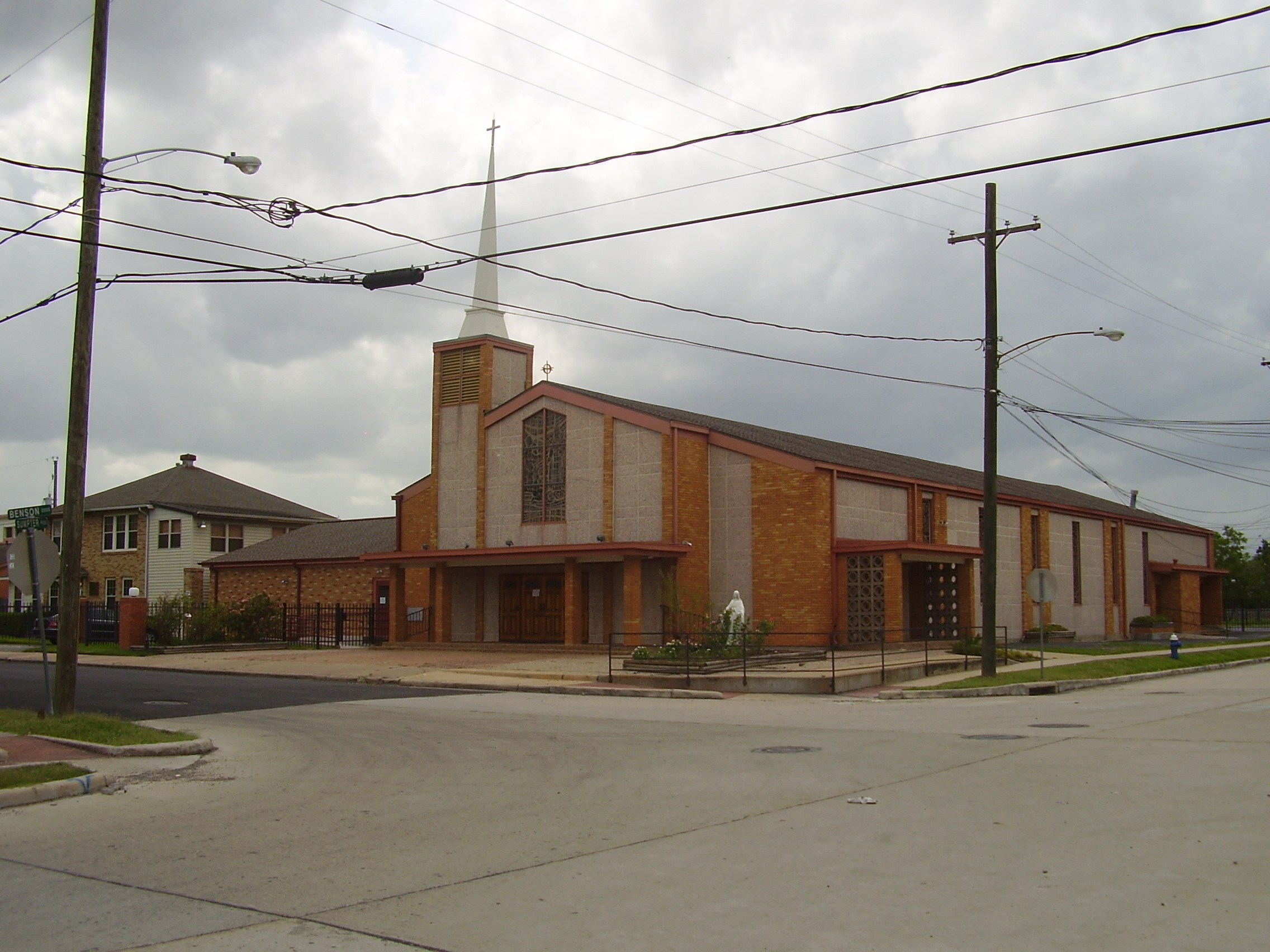
Our Mother of Mercy Catholic Church

In 1922, a group of Louisiana Creoles organized the Fifth Ward community of "Frenchtown," which contained a largely Roman Catholic and Creole culture. The Great Mississippi Flood of 1927 forced many Creoles to leave Louisiana, and they settled the Frenchtown area. When new residents no longer moved to Frenchtown, the neighborhood culturally merged with the greater Fifth Ward.

== Culture ==
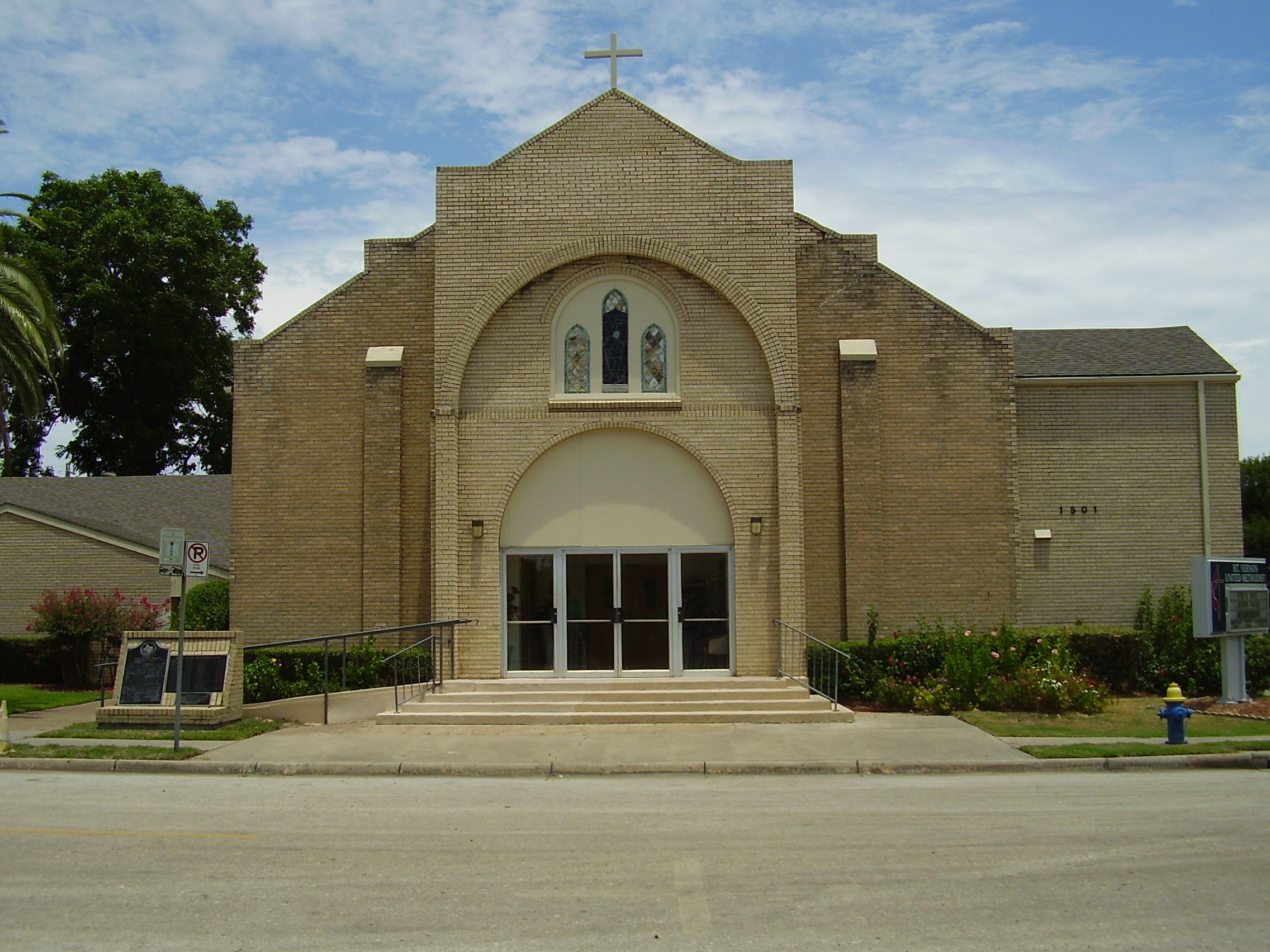
Mount Vernon United Methodist Church, the Fifth Ward's oldest church

Lisa Gray, a journalist for the Houston Press, stated in a 2000 article that the Fifth Ward has an overall sense of history and a "small-scale, deep-rooted personal history, the way that, in the middle of the city, lives are intertwined in a small-town way." Many families from the area had lived in the Fifth Ward for several generations.

In previous eras, African-Americans of all social classes lived in the Fifth Ward; African-American professionals patronized businesses. After the end of segregation, African-American professionals began to patronize other neighborhoods, and members of the African-American middle class moved out of the Fifth Ward.

The north-south Southern Pacific Transportation Company railroad tracks separate the Fifth Ward from Denver Harbor. David Benson, an assistant to Harris County Commissioner El Franco Lee, described the railroad line as "a semi-permeable membrane." In the 1990s many Fifth Ward African-Americans went into Denver Harbor to shop at the area supermarket and stores, while the Denver Harbor Hispanics rarely entered the Fifth Ward.

Richard West of the Texas Monthly wrote in 1979 that within the Fifth Ward one's personal status "is determined less by what you have than by personal qualities of wit and style and by what you know of the power structure of the street".

=== Religion ===
Mount Vernon United Methodist Church, founded in 1865, is the community's oldest church, and the Fifth Ward has six churches that, as of 2011, are over 100 years old. Kate Shellnutt of the Houston Chronicle said that the historic church facilities "have been community strongholds."

In 1979 the largest church in the Fifth Ward was the Pleasant Grove Baptist Church, with 5,600 members.

The Our Mother of Mercy Catholic Church, completed in 1930 by Creoles for Creoles, serves as a social center for the Frenchtown neighborhood.

== Education ==
=== Primary and secondary schools ===
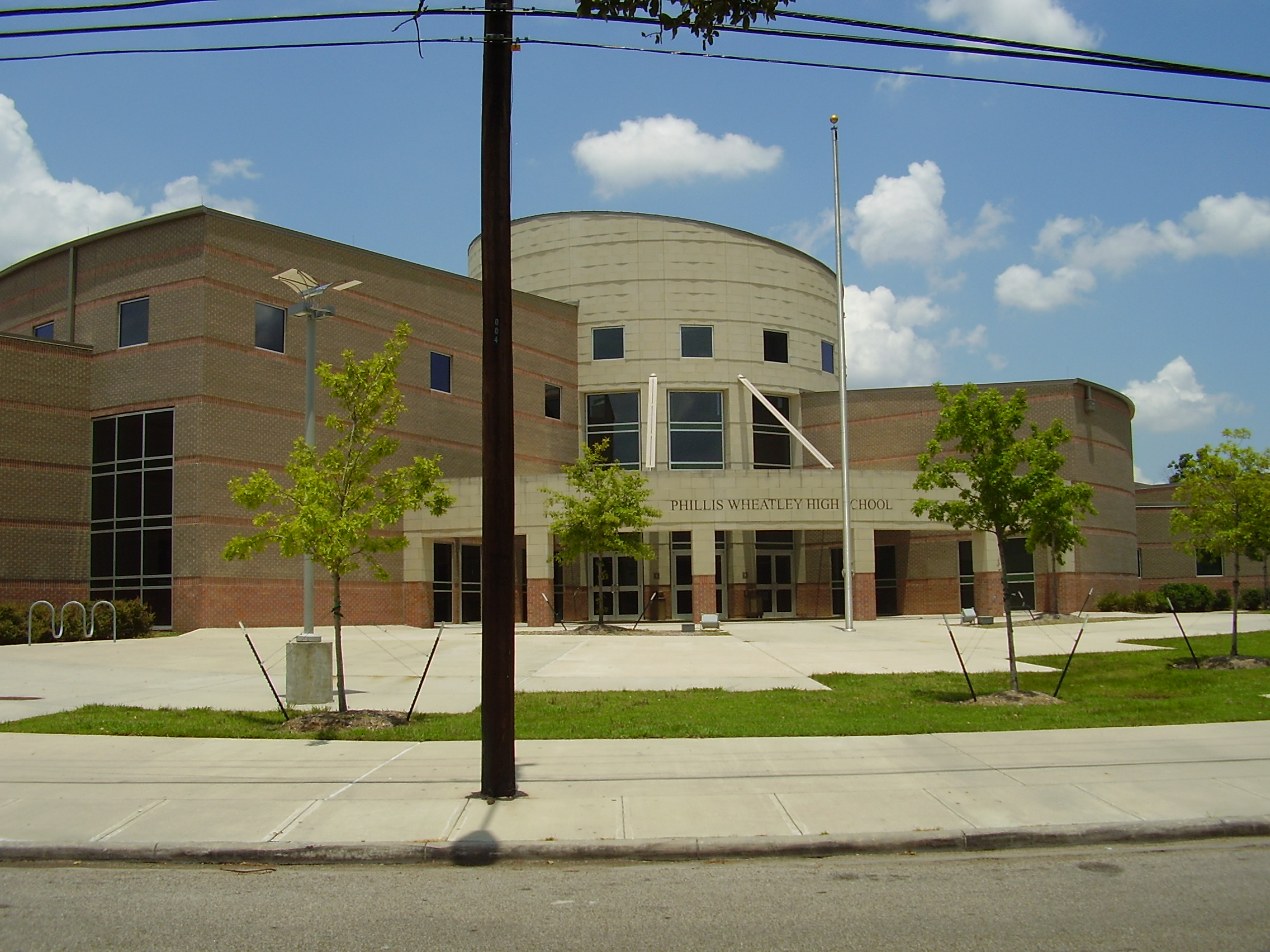
Wheatley High School

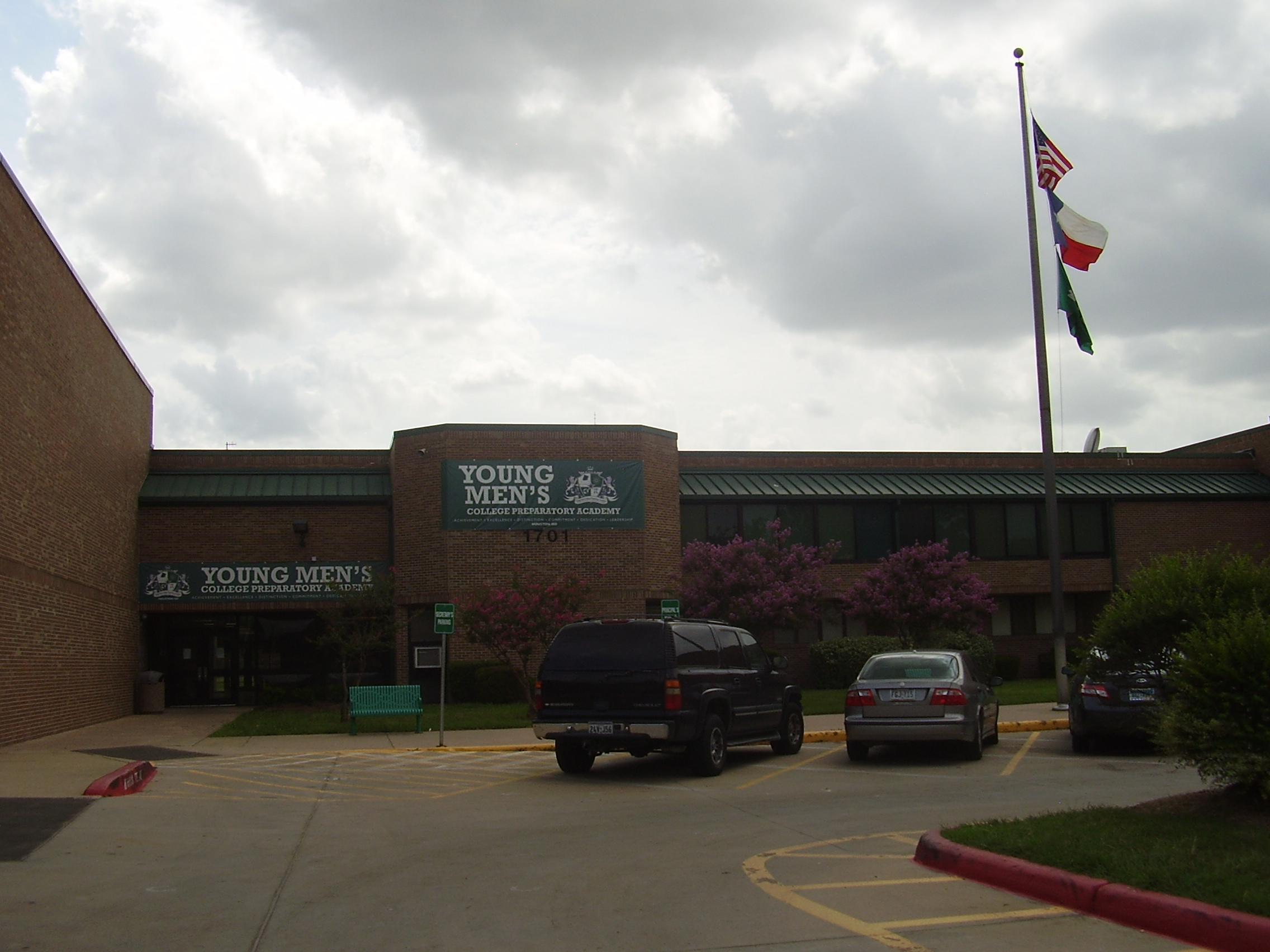
Young Men's College Preparatory Academy (former campus)

==== Public schools ====
Area students attend schools in the Houston Independent School District. As of 1997 even though most of the Fifth Ward and the adjacent Denver Harbor neighborhood are zoned to the same high school, the areas are represented by different board members.

Elementary schools in the Fifth Ward and serving sections of the Fifth Ward include Charles H. Atherton, Blanche Kelso Bruce, Dogan, and Nathaniel Q. "Nat" Henderson. Sherman Elementary School, outside of the Fifth Ward, serves a portion. As of 2019 due to the proximity of Interstate 45, Bruce Elementary experienced noise pollution and twice the amount of asthma compared to the HISD average. About 99% of the students were black or Hispanic.

Some areas are zoned to John L. McReynolds Middle School in Denver Harbor, and some areas are zoned to Lamar Fleming Middle School, north of the Fifth Ward. Phillis Wheatley High School in the Fifth Ward serves almost all of the Fifth Ward, while Northside High School (formerly Jefferson Davis High School) serves a small portion of the Fifth Ward. Young Men's College Preparatory Academy, an all-boys middle and high school, is in the Fifth Ward.

Effective 2026, Fleming and McReynolds middle schools will move onto the property of Leland Middle and merge into a comprehensive middle school that shares the property with the boys' school.

YES Prep Fifth Ward, a state charter school, is in the Fifth Ward. It was founded in 2011. Northwest Preparatory Academy, a state charter school, is in the Fifth Ward.

==== Private schools ====
A Kindergarten through 8 Roman Catholic school called Our Mother of Mercy School, the school of the Our Mother of Mercy Catholic Church of the Roman Catholic Archdiocese of Galveston-Houston, was in the area. It closed in Spring 2009. The school was consolidated with St. Francis of Assisi School in Kashmere Gardens, which closed in 2020.

==== Histories of schools ====
Smith Education Center first opened in 1913. Crawford opened in 1917. Bruce opened at 713 Bringurst in 1920. Davis opened in 1926. On January 31, 1927 Wheatley first opened in the former McGowan Elementary School building. A school which was originally a county school was relocated to 2011 Solo Street in 1927; in 1929 it was renamed after Charles H. Atherton. The building later known as Carter Career Center opened in 1929. Wheatley received a new facility in 1949. A school was named after Nathaniel Q. Henderson in 1956. McReynolds opened in 1957. Fleming opened in 1968. In 2006 much of Wheatley High School had been rebuilt. Bruce moved to a new facility at 510 Jensen Drive in 2007.

By Spring 2011 Atherton Elementary School and E.O. Smith Education Center (K-8) were consolidated with a new K-5 campus in the Atherton site. By Spring 2011 Crawford Elementary School, a campus in the Fifth Ward, and Sherman Elementary School, a campus outside of the Fifth Ward, were consolidated, with a new campus in the Sherman site. As of Spring 2011 Atherton is located in the previous Concord Elementary School/North District office building. Fifth Ward middle school students previously zoned to Smith were rezoned to Fleming and McReynolds.

By 2011, Young Men's College Preparatory Academy was to open in the current Smith location. By 2015 it moved to the former Crawford Elementary School. Its permanent campus is on the site of the former Carter Career Center.

The Fifth Ward included the DeVry Advantage Academy, a DeVry University-affiliated HISD high school housed in a building that was formerly housing Carter Career Center, an HISD vocational school and pregnant girls' school. DeVry opened in 2011 and closed in 2012.

Benji's Special Educational Academy, a state charter school near the Fifth Ward, merged into Victory Preparatory Academy in 2011; that northern campus of V Prep closed in February 2018.

=== Public libraries ===
The Fifth Ward is served by the Houston Public Library Fifth Ward Neighborhood Library.

== Community services ==
Fifth Ward Community Redevelopment Corporation is a nonprofit community-based agency located in Houston’s historic Fifth Ward community. In 1989, community civic leaders, business owners, ministers and educators came together in the interest of community improvement. The organization has operated under the same name since its inception. The Fifth Ward Enrichment Program operates afterschool programs. Community Partners operated community services in the Fifth Ward. The Human Organizational Political and Economic Development, Inc. was established in the summer of 1967 by Methodist minister Reverend Earl Allen and operated a Black Arts Center, the Roxy Theater and published the Voice of Hope. John de Menil had been instrumental in providing funding, and the organization encountered financial difficulty's after de Menil's 1973 death. The Emergency School Aid act provided $164,000 in September 1978, and the National Endowment of the Arts stated that it would give a grant of $15,000 one month later. Habitat for Humanity built Fifth Ward houses beginning in 1991, with the first on Rowley Street.

== Parks and recreation ==
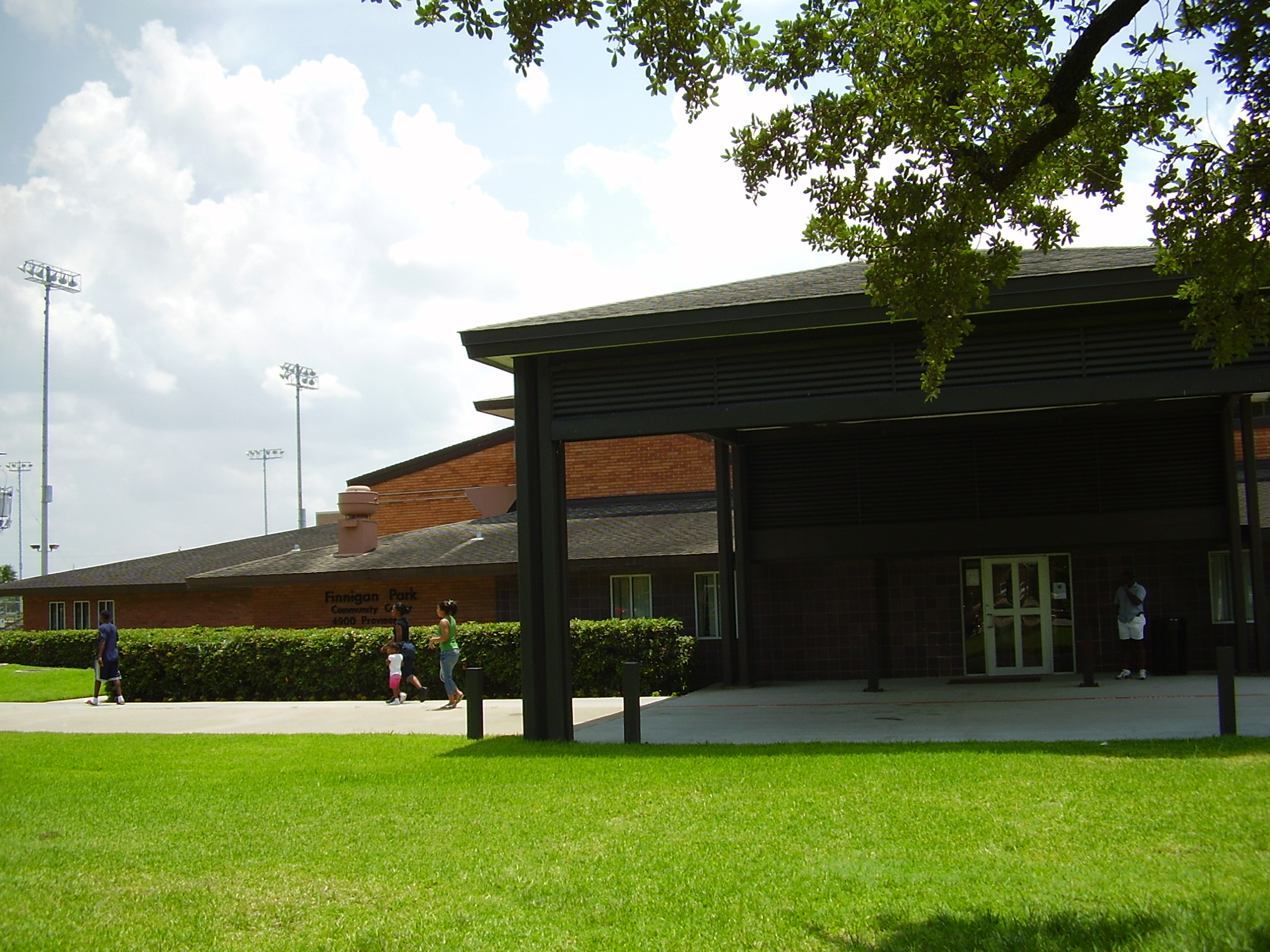
Finnigan Park

Finnigan Park and Community Center, operated by Harris County Precinct One, is located at 4900 Providence. The park has a lighted sports field, a swimming pool, lighted tennis courts, a .65 mile hike and bicycle trail, and a playground. The community center has an indoor gymnasium, a weight room a kitchen and a computer room. It was named after the person who donated the land for the park in 1939, Annette Finnigan. In May 2011 the city announced that it is closing Finnigan Pool.

The Swiney Community Center, operated by the City of Houston is located at 2812 Cline. The center has a playground and an outdoor basketball pavilion.

The city will establish the Fifth Ward Future Park at 4700 Clinton, 77020.

The Julia C. Hester House serves as a settlement house and community center. As of 1979 it offers youth activities and community services, and it is a part of the United Fund. It was originally known as Houston Negro Community Center of the Fifth Ward, but it received its current name before its opening. A biracial committee established the center in 1943 to improve the education, health, and welfare of Fifth Ward residents. It originally used rented facilities on Lyons Avenue, before moving into a $150,000 building on Solo Street in 1949; the center has occupied the Solo Street building since then. West wrote that in the Fifth Ward the Hester House "is as much an institution as Wheatley High."

The Northeast Family YMCA serves residents of the Fifth Ward.

== Transportation ==
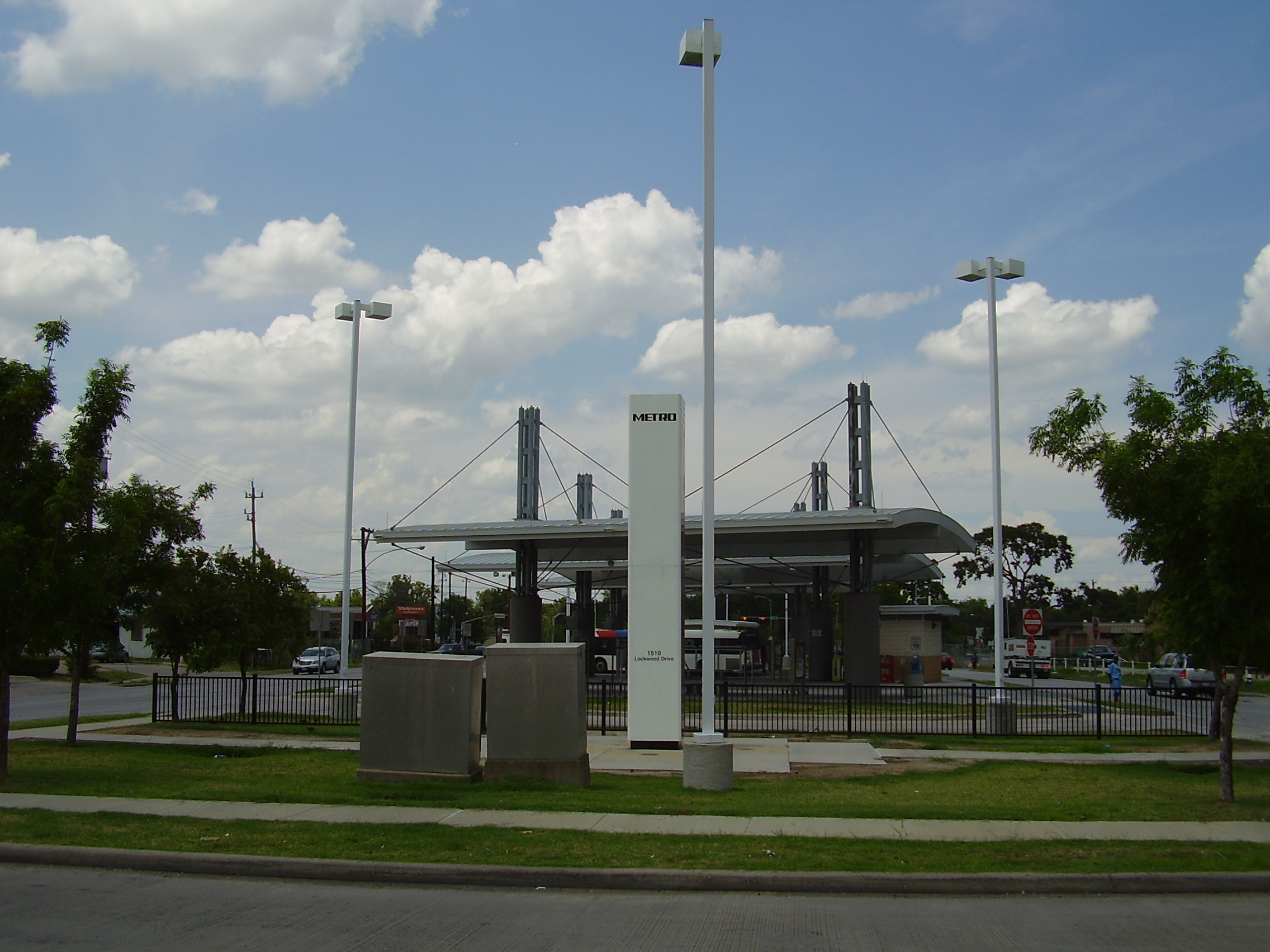
Fifth Ward/Denver Harbor Transit Center

Metropolitan Transit Authority of Harris County, Texas (METRO) operates bus routes. The agency operates the Fifth Ward/Denver Harbor Transit Center on Lockwood Street.

Prior to 1952 electric streetcar services were available on Lyons Avenue. Buses with steel wheels used these tracks during the late 1950s.

== In media ==
Greg Carter created the 1997 film Fifth Ward, financed from borrowed money from his mother and an insurance claim, and later made a derivative television show also called Fifth Ward.

Fifth Ward is where the rap group “The Geto Boys” originated from.

The crime novel Act of Love by Joe R. Lansdale is set in the Fifth Ward and tells the story about a fictitious serial killer kalled "The Houston Hacker".

== Notable people ==
Fruits of the Fifth Ward, a mural depicting 21 notable individuals who are either from the Fifth Ward or have connections to the Fifth Ward

- 5th Ward Boyz
- John T. Browne, (Mayor of Houston) - As of 1979 his residence was used as an Italian American-owned grocery store, Orlando's Grocery
- Arnett Cobb, saxophonist
- Carl Crawford, professional baseball player
- Alfred C. Finn, architect
- George Foreman - professional boxer and heavyweight champion
- Geto Boys
  - Willie D
  - Bushwick Bill
  - Scarface
- Illinois Jacquet, jazz musician
- Barbara Jordan, US congressperson and civil rights leader
  - As of 1979, Jordan's parents continued to live in the Fifth Ward.
- Milton Larkin, saxophonist
- Mickey Leland, US Congressperson and community leader
  - As of 1979, Leland's parents continued to live in the Fifth Ward.
- Ruth McClendon, state legislator representing a district in San Antonio
- James Prince
- Joe Sample
- Ruth Simmons, president of Prairie View A&M University and former President of Brown University
- Lonnie Smith, plaintiff of Smith v. Allwright
- Selvin Young

Fruits of the Fifth Ward, a mural depicting 21 notable individuals who are natives of the Fifth Ward or have connections to the Fifth Ward, was created by Wheatley High School students. Reginald Adams, the executive director of the Museum of Cultural Arts Houston (MOCAH), oversaw the creation of the mural. The project began after the History Channel gave MOCAH a $10,000 grant to create a mural depicting the history of the Fifth Ward. The mural was constructed from February 15 to October 21, 2006. The mural was dedicated on Saturday October 21, 2006. The mural is adjacent to Crawford Elementary School.

== See also ==
- History of the African-Americans in Houston

== Related ==
- Pando, Patricia (July 2011). "In the Nickel, Houston's Fifth Ward" (PDF). Houston History Magazine. 8 (3): 33–37.
