= Creosote contamination in Houston's Fifth Ward =

Historic treatment of rail ties in the Houston, Texas Fifth Ward and Kashmere Gardens neighborhoods has exposed residents to cancer-causing soil contamination. Creosote and its extenders were used in wood preservation processes at a nearby rail yard and have been identified as carcinogens that are hazardous to human health.

Former Houston Mayor Sylvester Turner and the EPA have advocated alongside the community for environmental justice. As of 2019, the Greater Fifth Ward neighborhood had a majority population of color: 43% non-Hispanic Black, 51% Hispanic or Latinx, and 4% non-Hispanic white. As of 2019, the Kashmere Gardens neighborhood had 9,930 residents, 59% of which were non-Hispanic Black, 36% were Hispanic or Latinx, and 3% were non-Hispanic white.

For decades, the defunct Southern Pacific Railroad wood-preserving facility dumped chemicals into an unlined pit for disposal, and the facility's operations were eventually linked to groundwater contamination observed at the site. Residents noticed high cancer rates in the community, and the Texas Department of State Health Services confirmed a cancer cluster in the area in 2019. Later, in 2021, an assessment by the same organization discovered that there were higher than expected amounts of acute lymphoblastic leukemia in a roughly 2-mile area surrounding the rail yard. In the same year, the EPA collaborated with the Houston Health Department and Mayor Turner to begin addressing these concerns. In 2022, the City of Houston, Harris County, and the nonprofit organization Bayou City Initiative filed a lawsuit against Union Pacific Railroad under the Resource Conservation and Recovery Act about the contamination and initiated a plan to support residents. An agreement was later reached on February 27th, 2023, between the Environmental Protection Agency and the Union Pacific Railroad company that required the Union Pacific Railroad company to perform various types of soil and vapor intrusion testing for the sake of identifying any contaminants that may be present. As of 2023, the Fifth Ward Voluntary Relocation Plan has begun with an initial $5 million from the City of Houston allocated to the community. In 2024, results from further soil testing will be released.

== Sources of contamination ==
=== Creosote ===
Creosote has been used as a wood preservative since the 1800s. Distilled from coal tar and composed of more than 200 aromatic hydrocarbons, creosote was applied to outdoor wood products such as railway ties and utility poles to prevent rotting or consumption by termites and pests. In 1988, the U.S. Environmental Protection Agency's Integrated Risk Information System released a chemical assessment report on creosote, classifying it as a carcinogen.

At the Fifth Ward railyard site, creosote waste materials were able to leach out of unprotected disposal pits and into the surrounding soil. Over time, a plume of concentrated liquid contaminants from the pits descended until it reached an impermeable soil layer and began to spread horizontally, pushing the creosote plume underneath the neighborhoods surrounding the railyard. Today, more than 110 homes in the Kashmere Gardens neighborhood sit above the plume.

=== Polycyclic Aromatic Hydrocarbons ===
Polycyclic aromatic hydrocarbons, also known as PAHs, are an umbrella term for a class of over 100 chemicals that are frequently present as a result of the partial burning of gas, wood, coal, or waste material. Additionally, they commonly appear in wood preservation sites such as the 5th Ward. These chemicals travel through water and adhere to soil particles, allowing them to seep into groundwater, lengthening the amount of time it takes for them to break down, which can be anywhere from months to years. PAHs located in groundwater have high chances of leaking into and contaminating drinking water, especially if the water is coming from a private well. PAHs also have capabilities, such as being hydrophobic, that allow them to spread through soil, air, water, and vegetation. The Environmental Protection Agency has designated 16 priority PAHs, 7 of which are expected carcinogens.

Benzo[a]pyrene, one of the seven carcinogens and a prominent PAH found in the 5th Ward, has been understood to have lasting effects on reproductive organs and developing fetuses. It has also been shown to cause liver, skin, lung, kidney, throat, stomach, and bladder cancer in animals, along with lung and skin cancer in humans.

=== Dioxin ===
To increase the volume of creosote available for wood treatment, Southern Pacific used creosote extenders in the site's treatment process. Concerns arose when it was revealed that some of these extenders were sourced from what are now Houston-area Superfund sites––including Brio Refining, Dixie Oil Processors, and Motco––bringing the extender's safety and toxicity into question. Known carcinogens, such as polychlorinated biphenyls, vinyl chloride, mercury, and lead, have all been found at these Superfund sites during historical tests.

In 2022, soil samples taken from the Kashmere Gardens neighborhood tested positive for the chemical dioxin, a persistent organic pollutant that poses a threat to human health through bioaccumulation. In prior studies of environmental contaminants (e.g. Agent Orange), dioxin exposure has been linked to cancers such as soft tissue sarcoma, Hodgkin's and non-Hodgkin's lymphoma, lung, and prostate cancers. Low-temperature combustion of organic and inorganic chlorides, such as polyvinyl chloride (PVC), has been shown to form dioxin; the dioxin found at the rail yard was likely created when the mixture of creosote and creosote extender was incinerated for disposal. Dioxin exposure has also been linked to liver cancers, one of the prevalent types of cancer in the Fifth Ward cancer cluster.

== History ==
=== Houston Wood Preserving Works operational period (1899-1984) ===
The exact onset of chemical wood treatment at the Houston Wood Preserving Works is unclear. The Union Pacific Railroad company says that Southern Pacific Transportation Company began chemical wood treatment in 1899 at the Houston Wood Preserving Works site. However, according to the City of Houston 90-Day Notice of Intent to Sue, it was not until 1911 that Southern Pacific Railroad Company established the Houston Wood Preserving Works at 4910 Liberty Road to treat railroad ties with creosote. The facility also used creosote extenders––other preservatives now considered hazardous––which Southern Pacific purchased from up to three Houston area suppliers whose sites are now EPA Superfund sites: Brio Refining and Dixie Oil Processors, in the Friendswood area, and Motco, in La Marque.

From its inception until operations ended in 1984, the Wood Preserving Works used open, unlined pits for disposal of creosote by-products. The tar-like substance seeped down to form a “creosote plume” under the Wood Preserving Works site and neighboring areas. The surrounding area had several industrial facilities, many of which contributed to pollution in the area; today, it is considered a “brownfield” area. As a result, it is difficult to ascertain all possible sources of contamination of nearby soil and water.

According to the Notice of Intent to Sue, creosote contamination from the Wood Preserving Works reached the groundwater under the Kashmere Gardens neighborhood sometime in the 1970s. In 1974, an explosion on Southern Pacific's site released vapors, damaged buildings, and injured many people. Similarly, in 1979, chemical-laden wastewater from the wood treatment caught fire in a ditch at the Wood Preserving Works. Much more recently, in 2014, Union Pacific paid residents in the area who agreed to use city water instead of groundwater on their properties, which may have been contaminated as far back as the 1970s.

In 1984, the EPA significantly restricted the use of creosote as a wood preservative and proposed to ban the use of creosote for any purpose other than wood preservation due to its status as a likely carcinogen. The same year, Southern Pacific ceased creosoting operations at the Wood Preserving Works. Shortly thereafter, Southern Pacific began cleanup operations of the site and dismantled all buildings. The area is still a rail yard, mostly paved over. Today, “tar-like sludge,” believed but not confirmed to be by-products from the creosote works, still seeps up between cracks in the pavement.

=== Union Pacific acquisition and clean-up attempts ===
In 1997, Union Pacific Railroad Company merged with Southern Pacific Railroad Company in a $5.4 billion deal, forming one of the largest railroad networks in the United States. Union Pacific management acquired the Southern Pacific Railroad Company and assumed responsibility for the Fifth Ward rail yard site. Union Pacific acknowledged Southern Pacific's use of an extender in the creosote treatment process, but it announced its use was discontinued upon discovering that the materials came from the three Superfund sites. Union Pacific took over environmental remediation at the site after the acquisition

Union Pacific extracted samples of creosote from wells on the site and found a large creosote plume that sat under the nearby neighborhoods. Prior cleanup efforts involved drilling 40-foot deep wells throughout the site to remove creosote and contaminated soil, and installing barriers with soil and asphalt caps consisting of clay, concrete, and other materials to prevent contamination from spreading. Union Pacific also claimed to periodically test the toxicity of the groundwater, monitor the chemical plume, and extract the creosote through wells. In 2014, Union Pacific proposed a plan for remediation to the Texas Commission on Environmental Quality (TCEQ) as part of its application for a Hazardous Industrial Waste Permit renewal. They also requested several amendments to the permit, including the establishment of an environmental management zone that would use “monitored natural attenuation” for the contamination, intending to allow the creosote to degrade and evaporate without direct intervention. Additionally, they notified residents of the creosote pollution, as required by the state environmental permits. The TCEQ responded, finding this plan to be inadequate, and advised increased testing, monitoring, and extraction efforts. As of April 2024, the plan is still in discussion, as Union Pacific maintains that the creosote plume does not pose a health risk

=== Initial reports of pollution ===
The identification of cancer clusters in the Fifth Ward was publicly announced in 2019. By this time, however, creosote and creosote extenders had already been present in the Fifth Ward as a result of the chemical dumping from years prior. The railroad yard's industrial waste came from the Brio Refining Superfund site, which was allegedly responsible for the reprocessing of chemicals. In 1991, the Houston Chronicle reported that 8 of 19 babies born within blocks of the dumping site were born with birth defects. Furthermore, 667 homes and an elementary school were shut down in Southbend, the adjacent neighborhood, as a result of growing health concerns.

The reprocessing of chemicals at the Brio Refining Superfund site was, according to chemical engineer Jim Tarr, “absolutely without a doubt dangerous.” In 2002, he wrote a report to provide information for a law firm representing workers who were allegedly harmed on the site. In his report, he claimed that Union Pacific mixed creosote with hazardous industrial waste to increase its available volume, using the waste as an “extender,” and that the toxicity associated with the creosote extender is more concerning than creosote itself.

== Identification of cancer cluster ==
In November 2019, the Texas Department of State Health Services was able to identify a statistically significant cancer cluster in Kashmere Gardens and Fifth Ward with no known cause. In the report by the Texas Department of State Health Services, Assessment of the Occurrence of Cancer Houston, Texas 2000–2016, it was found that when comparing the cancer analysis of the Fifth Ward to other areas within Texas and Houston, several cancers were statistically greater than what would be expected in an uncontaminated area.

=== Statistical analysis ===
Cancer Type	Observed	Expected	SIR	95% CI
Acute myeloid leukemia	24	18.7	1.29	(0.83, 1.92)
Lung and bronchus*	478	351.9	1.36	(1.24, 1.49)
Esophagus*	40	24.6	1.63	(1.16, 2.22)
Urinary bladder	68	67.4	1.01	(0.78, 1.28)
Nose and nasal cavity	8	3.7	2.18	(0.94, 4.30)
Larynx*	53	27.9	1.90	(1.42, 2.48)

Includes the analysis done by the Texas Department of State Health Services to identify the cancer cluster. “Standardized Incidence Ratios (SIRs) and 95 percent Confidence Intervals (CIs) for Selected Adult (≥20 years) Cancers in Houston, Texas, 2000-2016.”

In 2020, Dr. Loren Hopkins, the Chief Environmental Science Officer at the Houston Health Department, requested that further analysis be done in order to determine where the cancer clusters were most dense. The Houston Health Department observed that the census tracts in both the Greater Fifth Ward and Kashmere Gardens had a significantly higher than expected number of cancer cases.

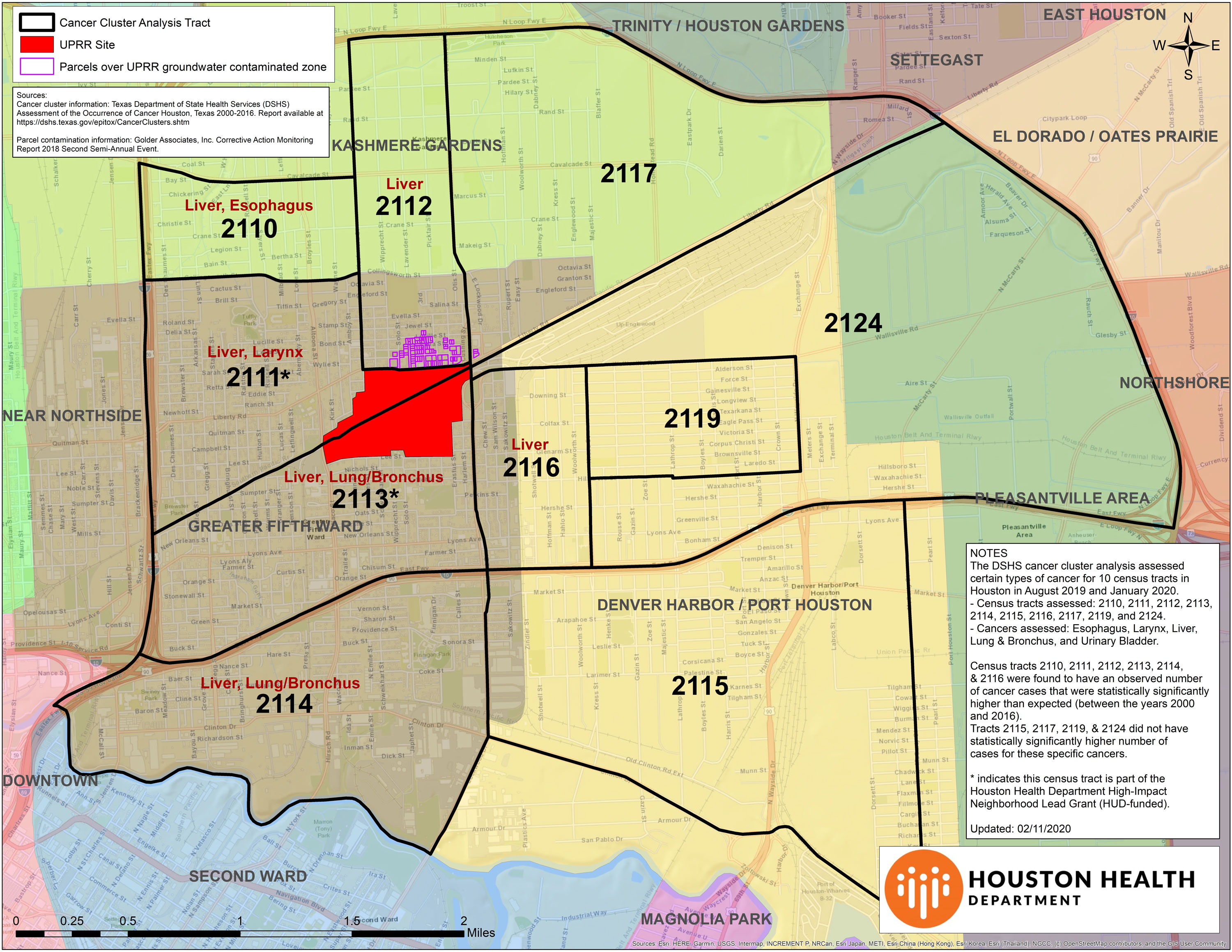
Figure 2. Ten census tracts, including 2110, 2111, 2112, 2113, 2114, 2115, 2116, 2117, 2119, and 2124 were analyzed for certain cancer clusters. The cancers analyzed included the esophagus, larynx, liver, lung & bronchus, and urinary bladder.

=== Consequent EPA legal actions ===
On September 9, 2021, the Acting Assistant Administrator in the Office of Land and Emergency Management for the EPA, Barry Breen, partnered with Houston Mayor Sylvester Turner to send a letter to Union Pacific Railroad President Lance M. Fritz. The letter voiced concerns for the health and well-being of the residents who live in proximity to the Union Pacific Railroad Houston Preserving Worksite.

The letter focused on the studies conducted by the Texas Department of State Health Services and their identification of elevated levels of both adult and child cancers. They expressed that the EPA will continue to seek action and included Mayor Turner's sixty-three questions for full transparency of the information on the contamination site. The topics of the questions include corporate information, facility operations, environmental conditions, health impacts, public utilities, source material, and more.

In response, Union Pacific developed a cover letter to provide answers to all questions asked by Mayor Turner and older documents written by Union Pacific during the time of operations. The document consisted of thirty-two written pages that responded to the sixty-three questions.

On January 26, 2022, EPA Environmental Administrator Michael Regan released an official announcement in response to many communities in the United States that had been historically and disproportionately impacted by pollution. Specifically for the Fifth Ward and Kashmere areas, he stated they were in the process of reviewing permit renewals and corrective action plans, and that they would work on governing the cleanup of the contaminated areas. In 2022, Regan also spoke with Mayor Turner to ensure that they will continue working together.

== Recent developments and ongoing actions ==
=== Testing ===
==== September and October 2020 ====
Data collection of 46 soil samples taken throughout three different neighborhoods around the Fifth Ward, assisted by the Coalition of Community Organizations during September and October of 2020, showed a range of 13,767 ng/g to 328 ng/g of the collective concentration of the 7 PAHs deemed carcinogenic in each sample. All 46 samples had heavy contamination levels in all three neighborhoods, 40 of which exceeded the EPA's screening criteria; however, none showed actionable levels of contamination for PAH cancer risk. It was also discovered that areas closer to the previous creosote plant, highway, and railyard exhibited higher concentrations than samples taken further from the three areas.

==== July-November 2021 ====
From July to November 2021, 103 soil samples were taken in the Greater Fifth Ward, assisted by students of the Texas A&M University School of Public Health. The collective concentration of the 7 PAHs determined to be carcinogenic ranged from 40,291 ng/g to 9.9 ng/g for each sample, while the 16 priority PAHs ranged from 26.32 ng/g to 59,254 ng/g. The researchers ascertained that at least 1 of the 16 priority PAHs designated by the EPA was in all 103 samples taken; however, 93.3% of the samples had low enough concentrations to not require remedial actions, while 6.7% of the samples were within the range for action to be taken. Additionally, close to every sample showed a pyrogenic index of greater than 0.5; ratios between 0.4 and 0.5 are often from petroleum burning, while ratios that exceed 0.5 come from wood, grass, or coal burning. 96% of the samples were shown to have originated from this kind of combustion. Benzo[a]pyrene and dibenzo(a,h)anthracene were the main chemicals present that pose a cancer threat, with BaP showing concentrations of 23236.6 ng/g, and dibenzo(a,h)anthracene having a concentration of 4344.5 ng/g.

In early 2024, the UPRR conducted the first phase of vapor intrusion testing to determine the safety of the site, including samples from the sewers, groundwater, and soil gas. As of April 2024, the EPA had released the first results from vapor testing. The sampling identified 41 creosote-related chemicals as Potential Contaminants of Concern.

==== April 30, 2024 EPA Community Update Meeting ====
On April 30, 2024 EPA released a new round of data at a 5th Ward/Kashmere Gardens UPRR Site Community meeting. This EPA presentation reviewed three directions of the EPA's investigation: the vapor intrusion investigation, neighborhood residential soil investigation, and the background soil study and former creosote plant soil sampling. The EPA's documentation indicated that they had completed sampling groundwater, soil gases, and sewer samples, and that sub slab and/or crawl space, and indoor air sampling would be done only if contaminants were identified in the collected samples.

EPA staff indicated that they were evaluating vapor intrusion (VI) results using the EPA's Vapor Intrusion Screening Levels (VISLs) metric, and that they had completed analysis of 91 out of 117 vapor intrusion samples collected. EPA staff broke out results into "potential contaminants of concern" (PCOC) and "other chemicals" (non-PCOCs). Results presented to the community showed that 11 samples exceeded EPA vapor intrusion screening levels for potential contaminants of concern by up to 283 times for naphthalene. Exceedances were also reported for benzene at 7 sites, for ethylbenzene at 7 sites, and for total xylenes, m,p-xylenes, and for 1,2,4-trimethylbenzene at two sites. For other chemicals, EPA reported exceedances of vapor intrusion screening levels for 1,4-dichlorobenzene, bromodichloromethane, chloroform, trichloroethylene, and n-nonane.The largest exceedance was for chloroform, where 27 locations exceeded the vapor intrusion screening level by up to 23 times (all data from).

Data was reported in terms of number of samples exceeding EPA vapor intrusion screening levels. No concentration data was reported for any samples measured, and the locations of exceedances were not reported.

On April 30, 2024 the EPA reported that background soil sampling had been completed on March 15, 2024. EPA indicated that they would use background samples "to provide context for residential soil samples." The April 30th, 2024 report does not indicate specifically how these background samples will be used (e.g. whether they will be used to determine Union Pacific accountability for contamination). The April 30th, 2024 report stated that the EPA followed the document "EPA Guidance for Comparing Background and Chemical Concentrations in Soil for CERCLA Sites" in selection of background sites.

The April 30th, 2024 update indicated that the EPA had a target start date of May 20 to begin sampling neighborhood soils, and that no sampling could be done without a signed access agreement. Potential impacts on individual property values following discovery of contaminants was not discussed.

By fall of 2024, the EPA will use the sampling data to determine risk of creosote contamination, report on the human health risk, and determine if cleanup will be needed. The UPRR will also provide a Removal Site Evaluation report. Updates can be found on the Fifth Ward/Kashmere Gardens UPRR site.

==== October 2024 ====
In October of 2024, the EPA conducted another round of soil sampling to detect which chemicals were still present in the 5th Ward; six zones were sampled. Three of the six public spaces, such as parks and elementary schools, exceeded the EPA screening value for chemicals such as benzo[a]pyrene, benzo[a]fluoranthene, benzo[a]anthracene, and dioxin. In the Union Pacific Railroad (UPRR) properties, one of the five sampled properties exceeded the screening levels in benzo[a]pyrene. In Zone 1, occupying the Liberty Rd. segment of the UPRR site boundary, 27 properties were sampled, nine of which were above the EPA screening criteria for dioxin/furan and benzo[a]pyrene. Zone 2, which covered the Amboy and Quitman Streets that run along the boundary, had 49 properties screened, with 11 exceeding the screening levels with dioxin/furan and semi-volatile organic compounds (SVOCs). Zone 3, between Nicols St. and the boundary, had 59 properties sampled, with 11 of them exceeding the screening levels with dioxin/furan and SVOCs. Finally, Zone 4, which occupied the area of Harlem St. and the railroad boundary, had 35 properties sampled, with 6 going over the screening levels with dioxin/furan and SVOCs.

=== Lawsuits ===
Two lawsuits are in progress as of 2024. The first is a private mass tort lawsuit between residents of the Fifth Ward and Union Pacific over damages, being litigated by Mack Injury Attorneys. The second lawsuit was filed by the City of Houston, and the Bayou City Initiative against Union Pacific. In July 2022, this group announced an intent to sue. The lawsuit would be filed under Section 7002(a) of the federal Resource Conservation and Recovery Act, which regulates hazardous waste disposal. Included in the notice of intent were sections on remediation and containment, as well as a potential buyout for the most heavily impacted residents.

== Resident voluntary relocation plan ==
In July 2023, former Houston Mayor Sylvester Turner announced the development of the Fifth Ward Voluntary Relocation Plan. He created a “strike force” that would relocate affected residents living within two to three blocks of the site, the 41 residential lots between Liberty, Lockwood, Wipprecht, and Jewel streets. Turner said the goal of the plan was to relocate residents to nearby uncontaminated areas as quickly as possible. He estimated that the relocation plan would cost between $24 and $26 million and hoped that Union Pacific would step in to cover costs. Union Pacific noted that they would not participate in relocation efforts until their testing alongside the EPA was completed.

In September 2023, the Houston City Council voted unanimously to allocate $5 million towards the Fifth Ward Voluntary Relocation plan to cover the costs of those wanting to relocate immediately. The $5 million was framed as a small initial investment, and the City Council asked Union Pacific, the EPA, and other donors to fund the remainder of the relocation plan. As of the City Council meeting, nine residents are considering relocation. Through the plan, the city offered renters $10,000 to relocate, which is estimated to cover two months of rent and moving costs. Houses of homeowners would then be appraised and bought out by the city for up to $250,000 per home.

Mayor Turner's term ended in December 2023, and in January 2024, new mayor John Whitmire paused the relocation plan, as many residents were wary about leaving their Fifth Ward and Kashmere Gardens communities and wanted more information on the relocation plan's logistics. Then, in February 2024, Houston City Council voted unanimously to allocate $2 million of the initial $5 million towards the Houston Land Bank to manage the relocation process. As of February 2024, residents in nine of the affected homes were considering relocation.

=== Real Estate Development Concerns ===
Between 2018 and 2023, 1,501 new residential buildings within the cancer cluster area were approved by the Houston permitting department. Because of its proximity to downtown, Fifth Ward is desirable real estate. However, some new residents were not made aware of the contamination, since environmental assessments are not mandatory in the state of Texas, and there is no requirement for sellers and real estate agents to disclose previous land usage. In February 2024, all new development within the areas designated as contaminated by the Fifth Ward Voluntary Relocation Plan was paused to further investigate the permits that had been approved.

Public meetings were hosted by City Council members in January 2024 to discuss the relocation plan, and one of the main concerns expressed by both residents and Mayor Whitmire was the redevelopment occurring in the Fifth Ward and Kashmere Gardens neighborhoods. During the meeting, Whitmire said that he was “flagged down at a couple of stop signs by residents that said they didn't want to move. They thought it was a land play or gentrification, largely by developers.”
