= Our Mother of Mercy Catholic Church =

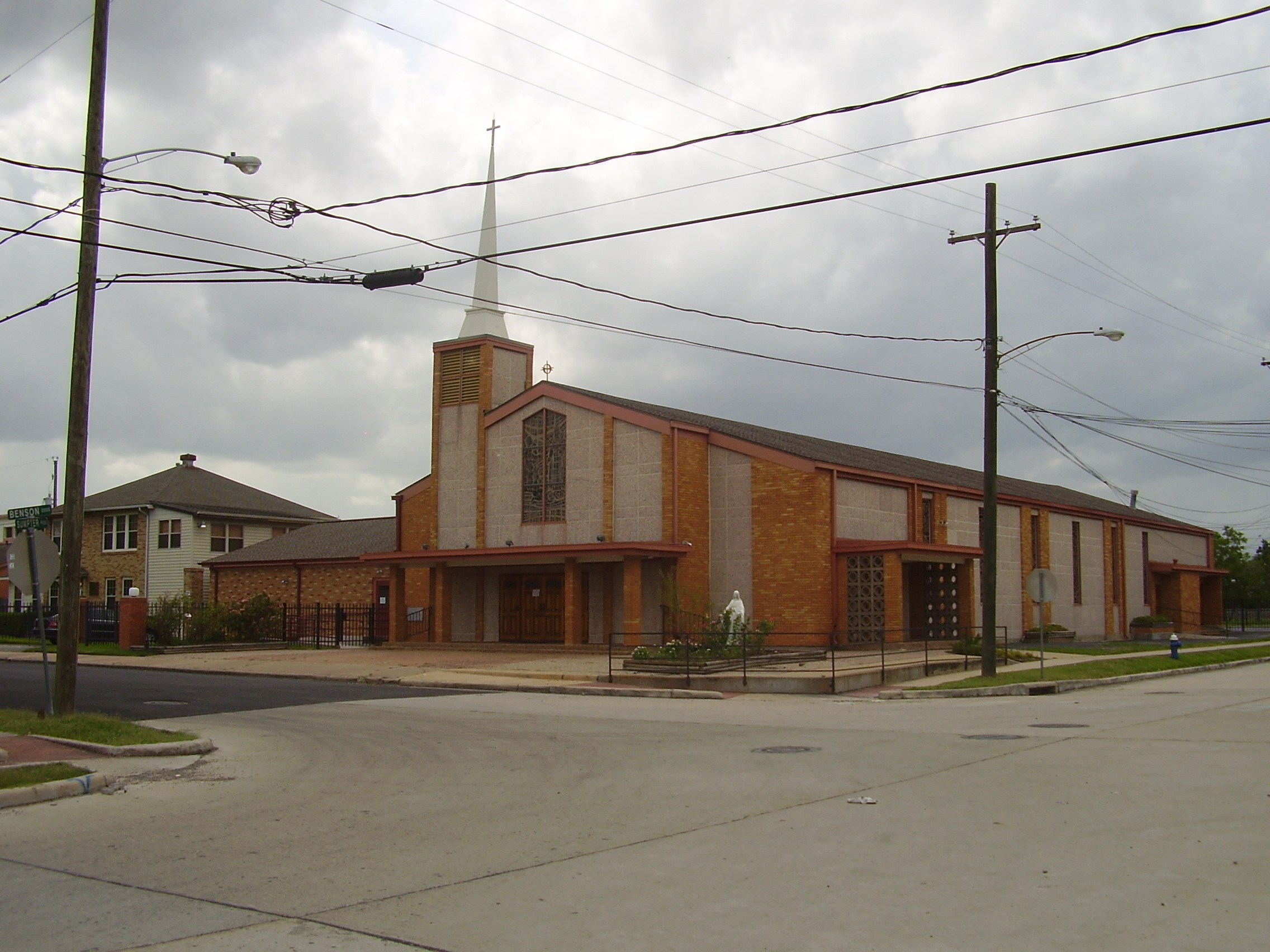
- Our Mother of Mercy Catholic Church
- Location: 4000 Sumpter St, Houston, Texas
- Country: United States
- Denomination: Catholic
- Religious institute: Society of St. Joseph of the Sacred Heart
- Website: https://www.ourmotherofmercy.net/

History
- Founded: 1928
- Dedication: Virgin of Mercy
- Dedicated: June 9, 1929

Architecture
- Functional status: Active
- Architectural type: Church
- Groundbreaking: April 28, 1928

Clergy
- Pastor(s): Fr Rodney Armstrong, SSJ

Our Mother of Mercy Catholic Church is a Black Catholic church in Frenchtown, an area within the Fifth Ward of Houston. It was the second Black parish to be established in the city and the first established by Louisiana Creoles. It was also the first institution created by non-Anglophones in an African-American neighborhood in the city. It is a part of the Archdiocese of Galveston-Houston and its membership has included both Creole and non-Creole African Americans.

== History ==
For a period, the closest Black church to the Fifth Ward was St. Nicholas, located in the Third Ward, about 3 miles (4.8 km) away. In the 1920s a group of Louisiana Creole people attended Our Lady of Guadalupe Church because it was the closest church to Frenchtown. Because the church treated the Creole people in a discriminatory manner, by forcing them to confess and take communion after people of other races did so and after forcing them to take the back pews, the Creoles opted to build their own church. In order to acquire funds, Creole families hosted dinners, dances, and parties. They served Louisiana Creole cuisine, using the food to acquire the means to build the church.

In 1928 the Roman Catholic Diocese of Galveston-Houston purchased two city blocks along Sumpter Street: the 4000 block and the 4100 block. On April 28, 1928, the groundbreaking occurred. The building was completed in the spring of 1929. The Josephites helped finance it. On June 9, 1929, Galveston-Houston bishop Byrne blessed the church.

The school opened several years later. The church became a diocesan church on June 30, 1930. The school, Our Mother of Mercy School, opened as a school for grades 1 through 12 in the 1930s. A convent and rectory were established on the property. The school closed in 2009.

Works Progress Administration employees wrote about the church in the 1930s. Tyina L. Steptoe, author of Houston Bound: Culture and Color in a Jim Crow City, stated that they "noted the centrality of the church" to area residents. By World War II, over half of Houston's black Catholics had attended the church, and over 4,000 black children, both Catholic and non-Catholic, had attended its school.

Other black churches in Acres Homes, Sunnyside, Trinity Gardens, and other communities used Our Mother of Mercy as a feeder church.

== Recreation ==
Historically the church sponsored bazaars and dances. Alcohol was sold at the bazaars. The practices of drinking alcohol and dancing communities differed from those of Protestant communities in Texas, which had historically prohibited drinking alcohol and did not have dancing to popular music during church events.

== School ==
Our Mother of Mercy Catholic School
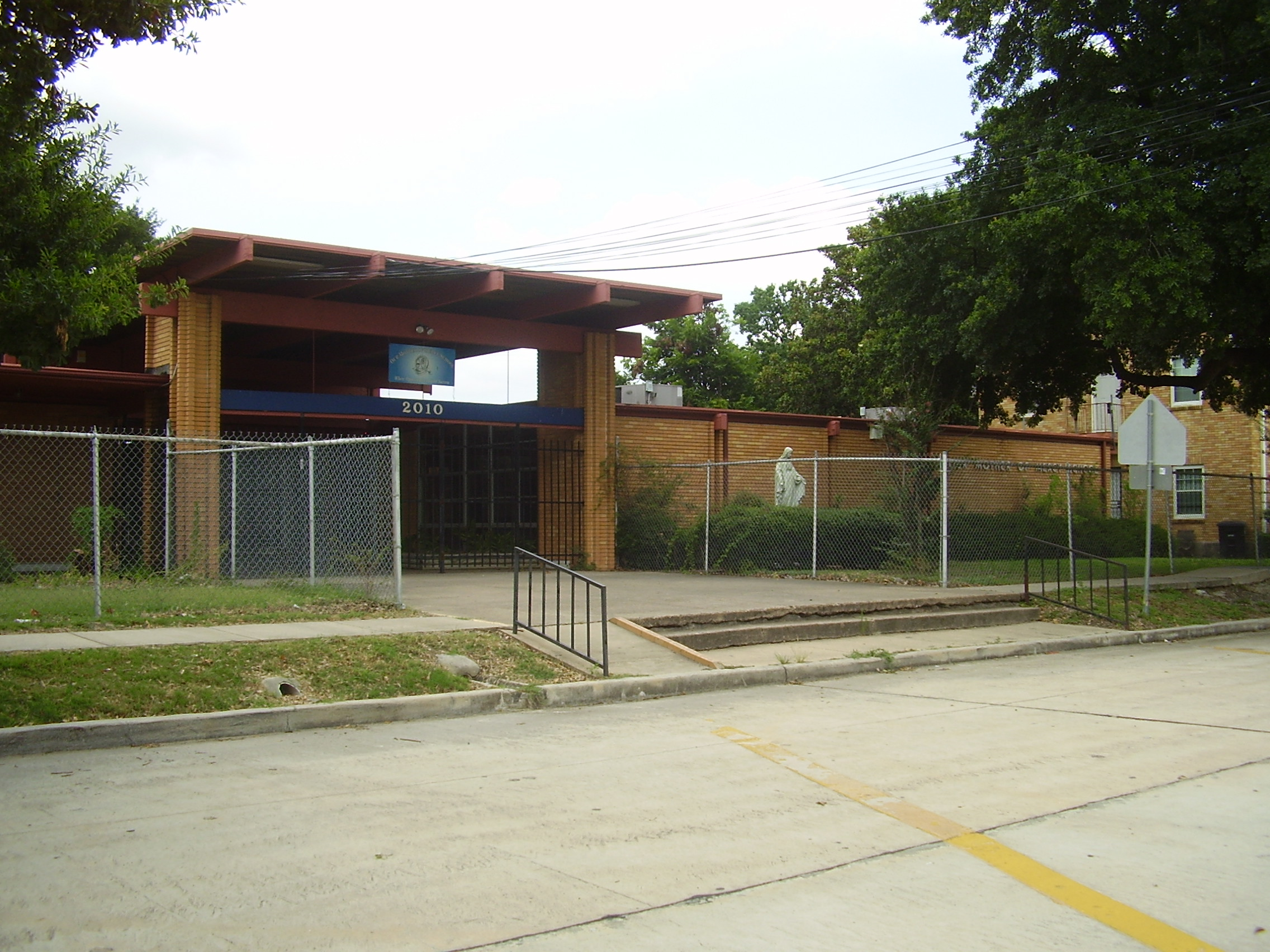
- Our Mother of Mercy Catholic School

Location
- 2010 Benson Street, Houston, Texas 77020
- Coordinates: 29.7802°N 95.3299°W

Information
- Type: Parochial, segregated
- Denomination: Roman Catholic
- Opened: 1930 or 1931
- Closed: 2009
- Grades: PreK-8 (initially 1-12)
- Affiliation: Roman Catholic Church
- Website: omomschool.org
- Last updated: December 29, 2017

Our Mother of Mercy Catholic School opened in fall 1930 or fall 1931, and closed in Spring 2009.

When it opened it served grades 1–12. The initial teaching force was the New Orleans–based Sisters of the Holy Family.

The school was consolidated with the St. Francis of Assisi School. As of 2009 the OMM school, which at that time was a PreK-8 school, had its annual tuition as $3,000 ($4502.09 when adjusted for inflation). That school closed in 2020.

== Notable members ==
- Joe Sample, was an American jazz, Jazz fusion keyboardist and composer. He was one of the founding members of The Jazz Crusaders in 1960, the band which shortened its name to "The Crusaders" in 1971. He funeralized at the church.
- Illinois Jacquet, was an American jazz tenor saxophonist, best remembered for his solo on "Flying Home", critically recognized as the first R&B saxophone solo.
- Mickey Leland, was an American politician and anti-poverty activist. He served as a congressman from the Texas 18th District and chair of the Congressional Black Caucus. He was a Democrat.

== See also ==
- History of the African-Americans in Houston
- Christianity in Houston
- Frenchy's Chicken (Louisiana Creole-style restaurant chain in Houston)
- Percy Creuzot (founder of Frenchy's, originated from New Orleans)
