= Denver Harbor, Houston =

Historic community in Houston, Texas, US

Coordinates: 29.775°N 95.300°W

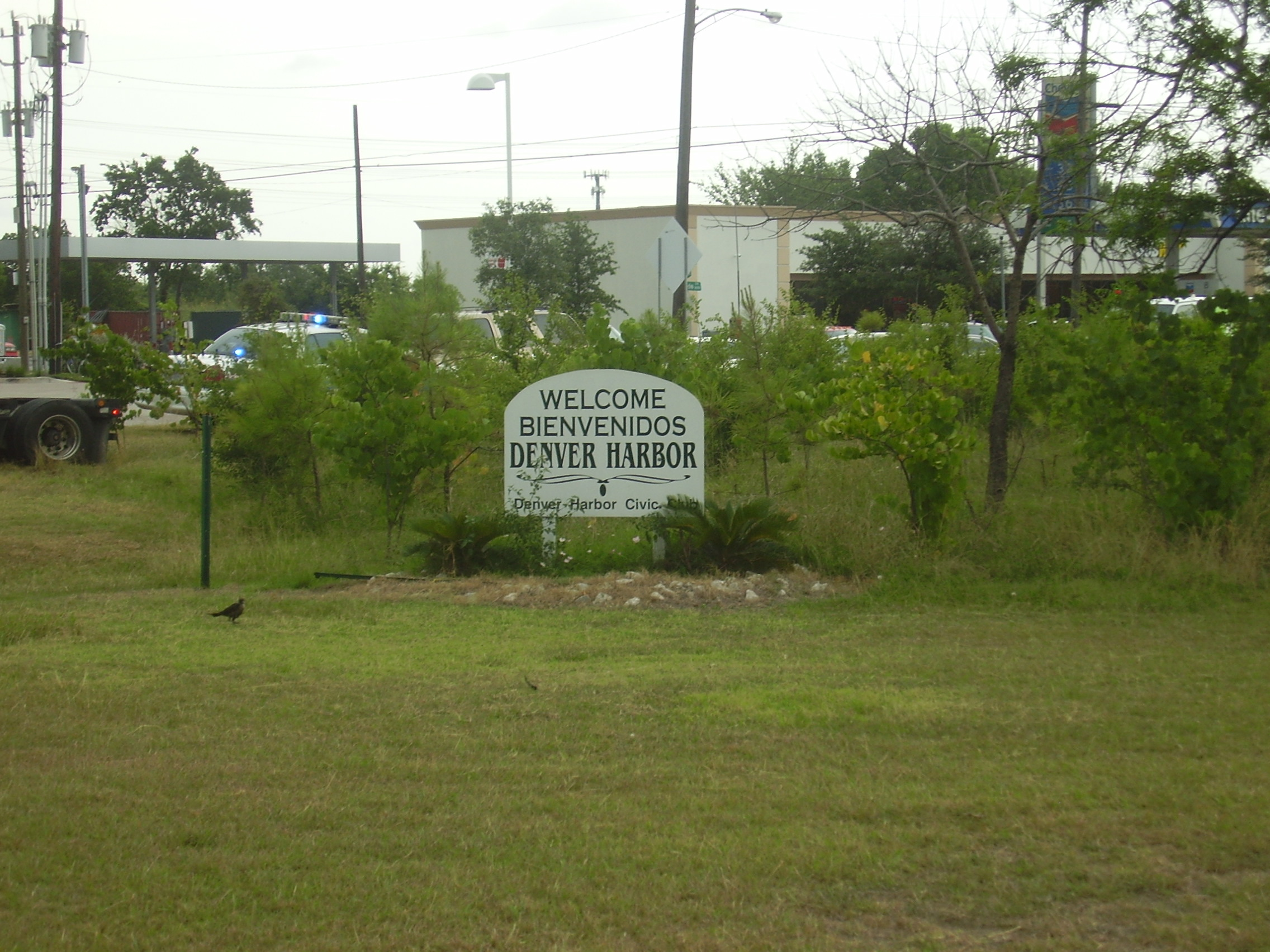
Denver Harbor entrance sign

Denver Harbor is a historic community located in eastern Houston, Texas, United States just north of the Houston Ship Channel. The community, bounded by Wallisville Road, the Union Pacific Railroad, and the Port Terminal Railroad Association, was first settled in the 1890s and platted in 1911 and 1913. The community includes many historic bungalow and cottage homes. The area forms the core of the city-designated Denver Harbor/Port Houston Super Neighborhood.

Denver Harbor is a mostly Hispanic community, and is adjacent to Second Ward, Magnolia Park, Fifth Ward, Kashmere Gardens, and Pleasantville.

== History ==
The area now known as Denver Harbor in a 1913 map of Houston

Denver Harbor was first settled in the 1890s and platted in 1911 and 1913. The four original subdivisions were: Denver, Harbor, Harbordale, and Liberty Heights. The names "Denver" and "Harbor" merged and became the name "Denver Harbor," which describes the entire community. Many early residents of Denver Harbor were Texans who left farms for the city neighborhood to make a better life for themselves and their families. These residents found work on the railroads and industrial companies that were established along the Houston Ship Channel. Greeks, Italians, and Poles settled Denver Harbor. The City of Houston annexed the Denver Harbor and Houston Harbor communities in 1929, adding 885 acres (358 ha) of land to the city limits.

On June 1, 1939, the word "Podunk" was mysteriously written on the side of the local water tower. The city tried repeatedly to cover over the word, however the name would always reappear within days. Inspired by the defiance of the sign's unknown painter, area residents soon began to identify as Podunkers. The names was adopted by a local youth basketball team known as the Podunk Skunks. The names, used in the 1930s and 1940s, was in reference to how Denver Harbor was considered to be "out-of-the-way." The slang became known after area children painted the word on a water tower. Jay Grady, an area resident, stated in a 2007 Houston Chronicle article that residents felt proud of the nickname since back then Denver Harbor was barely in the eastern city limits of Houston and that "it was kind of like living in the country rather than being in the city." Grady added that the community was "always been kind of a stepchild to the city of Houston, kind of a hardscrabble community, mostly blue-collar workers on the eastern edge of the city limits. We felt like we lived in the country rather than in town." As the population transitioned from working-class White Americans to Hispanic Americans the nickname was no longer used.

Dr. Jay Grady self-published 2,000 copies of his book Where the Hell is Podunk, Texas?, which is about Denver Harbor. In addition he lobbied to have Denver Harbor declared as the "official mythical town of Texas" due to the "Podunk" nickname. A Texas House of Representatives resolution that would have declared this was passed by the House and then rejected by most of the members of the Texas Senate, including Mario Gallegos, a Texas senator whose district includes Denver Harbor. In August 2007 Tropical Storm Erin flooded streets and houses in Denver Harbor. By 2008 residents from the area vocally opposed a perceived increase in crime.

== Government and infrastructure ==
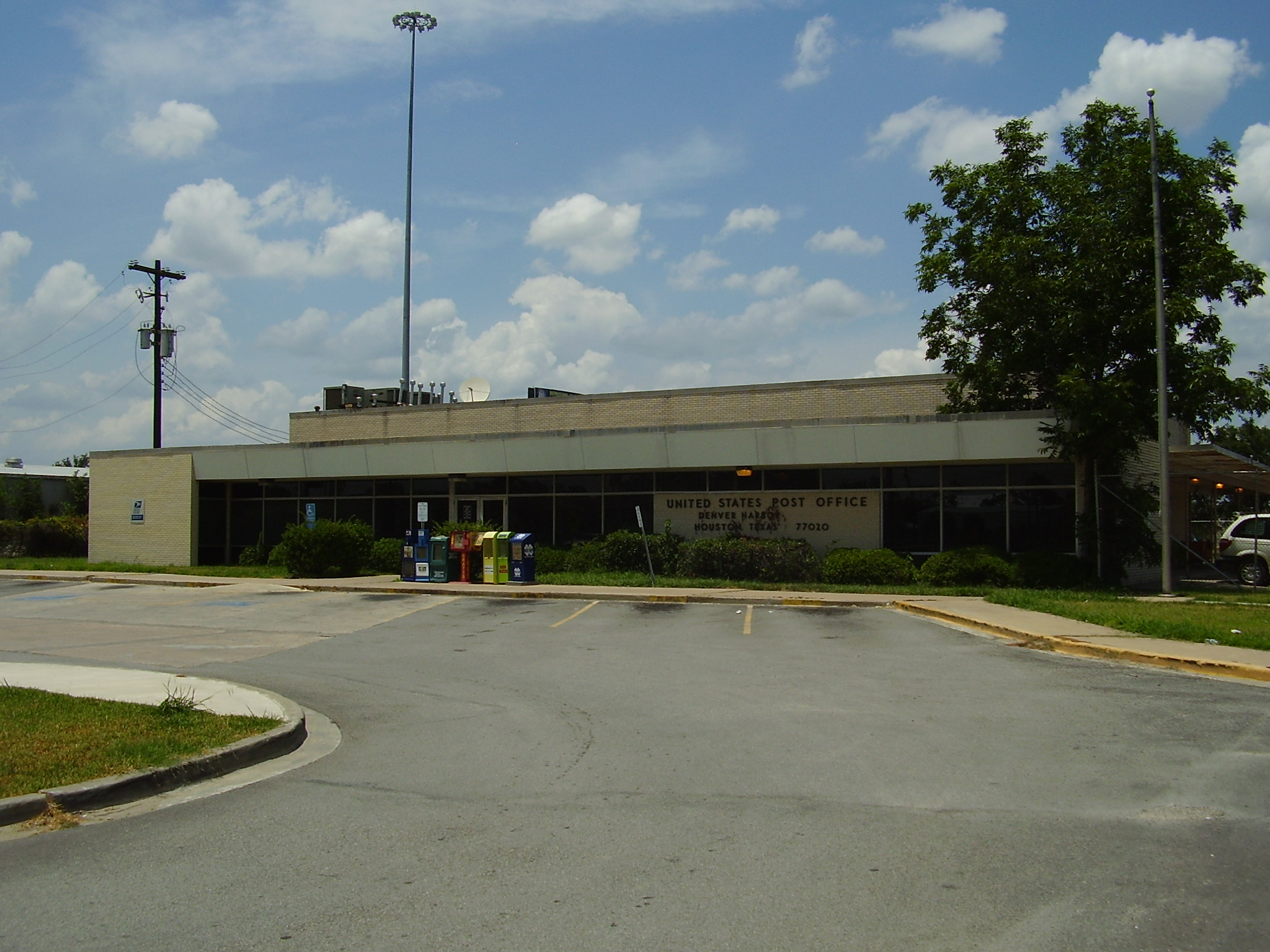
Denver Harbor Post Office

The city operates the Denver Harbor Multi-Service Center at 6402 Market Street. The multi-service center provides several services such as child care, programs for elderly residents, food pantry, WIC, and rental space.

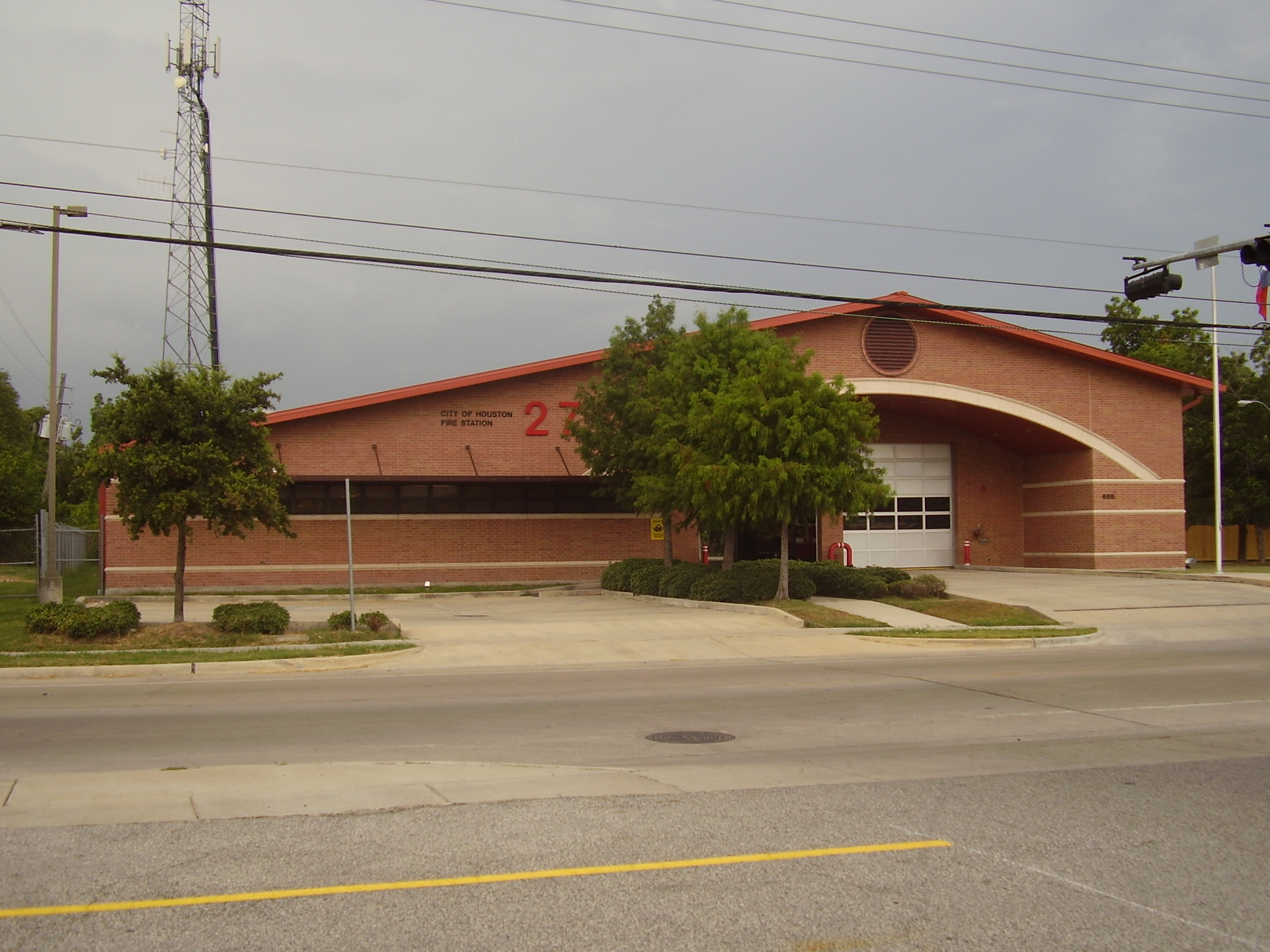
Fire Station 27

It is a part of Houston City Council District H. The City of Houston operates Fire Station 27. As World War II began, the city government was working on plans for Station 27. It opened at the intersection of Kress Street and Lyons Avenue in 1941. In November 2002 the groundbreaking for the current Station 27, larger than the previous one, occurred. A Community Development Block Grant funded the new station. It opened at its current location, 6515 Lyons Avenue, in May 2004.

The United States Postal Service operates the Denver Harbor Post Office at 5901 Market Street. In July 2011 the USPS announced that the post office may close. Some area residents criticized the proposed closure.

== Parks and recreation ==
The City of Houston operates the Selena Quintanilla Perez Park-Denver Harbor, named after Selena Quintanilla-Pérez, at 6402 Market Street. The park has a 0.87 mile hiking and bicycle trail, a volleyball court, a swimming pool, a playground, and a lighted sports field. The city operates the Denver Harbor Multi-Service Center, which has a weight room, and indoor gymnasium, and meeting rooms, at the same address. Cliff Tuttle Park is located at 6200 Lyons Avenue. Santos & Esther Nieto Park is located at 500 Port Street.

== Culture ==
The north-south Union Pacific Railroad railroad tracks separate Denver Harbor from the Fifth Ward. David Benson, an assistant to former Harris County Commissioner El Franco Lee, described the railroad line as "a semi-permeable membrane." In the 1990s many Fifth Ward African-Americans went into Denver Harbor to shop at the area supermarket and stores, while the Denver Harbor Hispanics rarely entered the Fifth Ward.

== Education ==
=== Primary and secondary schools ===
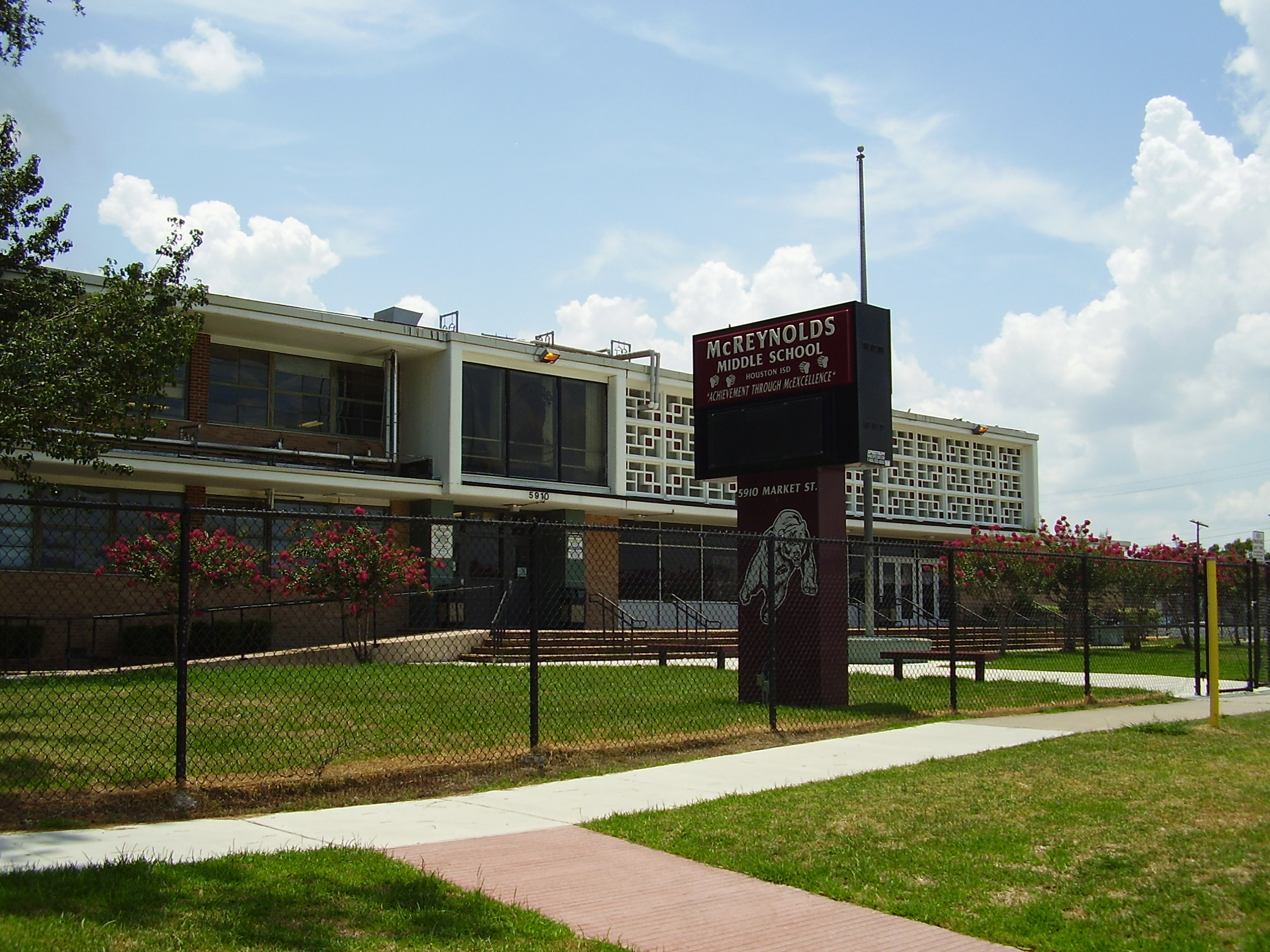
McReynolds Middle School

Residents attend the Houston Independent School District. Denver Harbor is in Trustee District VIII, represented by Judith Cruz.

Zoned elementary schools serving sections of the neighborhood include Charles Eliot Elementary School, Raul C. Martínez Elementary School, Pugh Elementary School, and Scroggins Elementary School. Pugh Elementary is in the Denver Annex area Block 6. Eliot Elementary is in Harbor Homesite. Scroggins Elementary School is in Houston Harbor Block 37 and Houston Harbor Annex Block 10. R. Martínez Elementary is in Houston Harbor blocks 77, 81, and 85. All areas in Denver Harbor are zoned to McReynolds Middle School and Wheatley High School. McReynolds is in Denver Addition Blocks 10-11, 14-15, and 34-35. Wheatley is outside of Denver Harbor, in the Fifth Ward.

Eliot opened in 1926. Pugh received its name in 1952. McReynolds opened in 1957. Scroggins opened in 1968. Wheatley High School, in the Fifth Ward, was desegregated, Houston ISD rezoned Denver Harbor, which at that time had few White residents of school age and was predominantly Hispanic, to Wheatley. Many area Hispanic students preferred to attend Austin High School and Furr High School as they became the majority population at those schools. Even though Denver Harbor and the Fifth Ward are both zoned to Wheatley, the two areas are represented by different board members. Martínez opened in 1994.

Effective 2026, Fleming and McReynolds middle schools will move onto the property of Leland Middle and merge into a comprehensive middle school that shares the property with the boys' school.

The Roman Catholic Archdiocese of Galveston-Houston operates Resurrection School, a 3K-8 coeducational Roman Catholic school, at 916 Majestic Street, in Denver Addition Block 26. In summer 1937 its first building was built. From the 2011-2012 to 2012-2013 school years enrollment was projected to increase by 55%.

=== Community college ===
Residents are within the Houston Community College System boundaries.

=== Public libraries ===
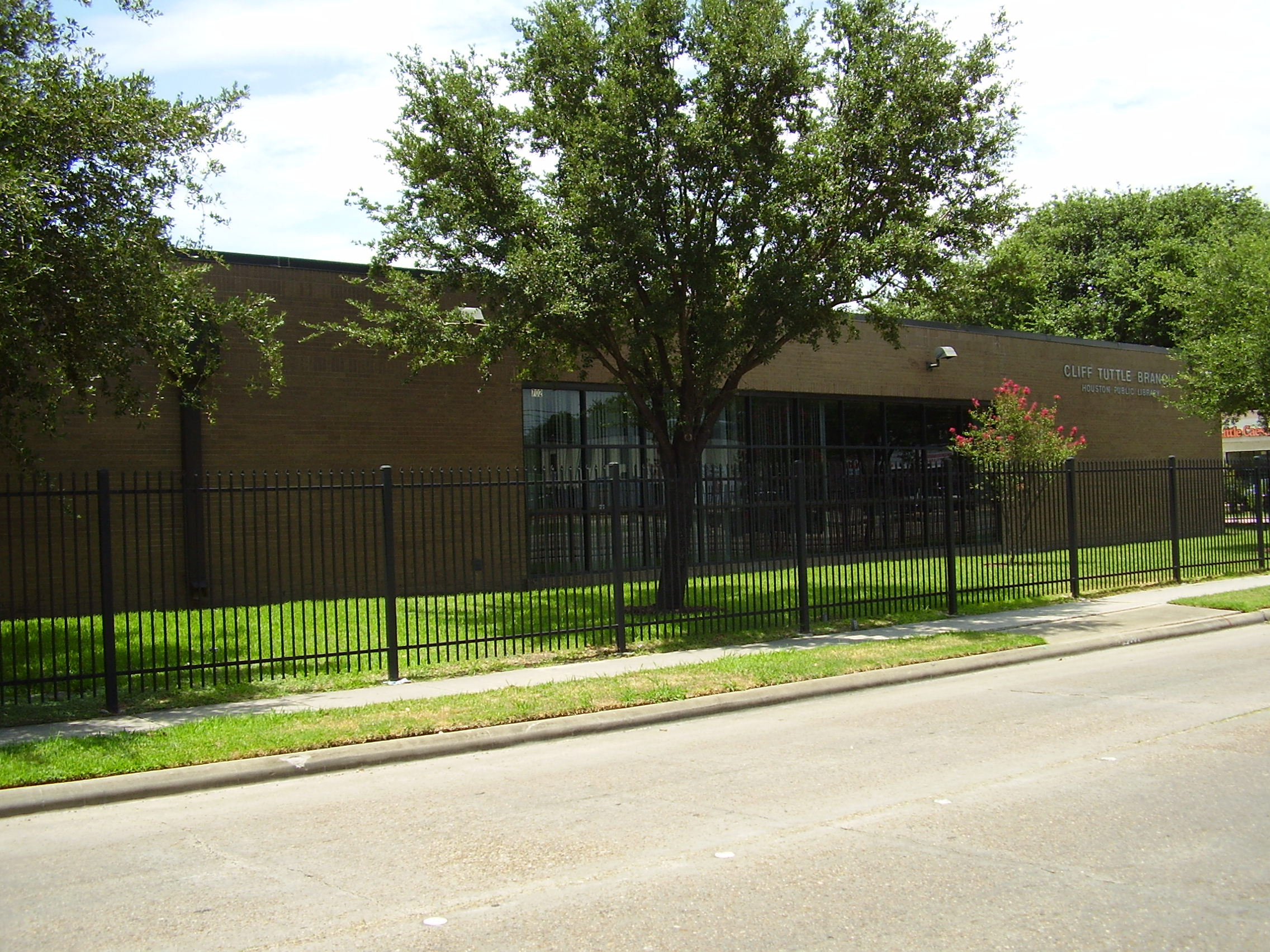
Cliff Tuttle Neighborhood Library

The Houston Public Library operates the Cliff Tuttle Neighborhood Library at 702 Kress Street.

== Notable residents ==
- Ben Reyes (former politician and felon)

== See also ==
- List of Houston neighborhoods
