= Jefferson Davis Hospital =

- U.S. National Register of Historic Places
- Recorded Texas Historic Landmark
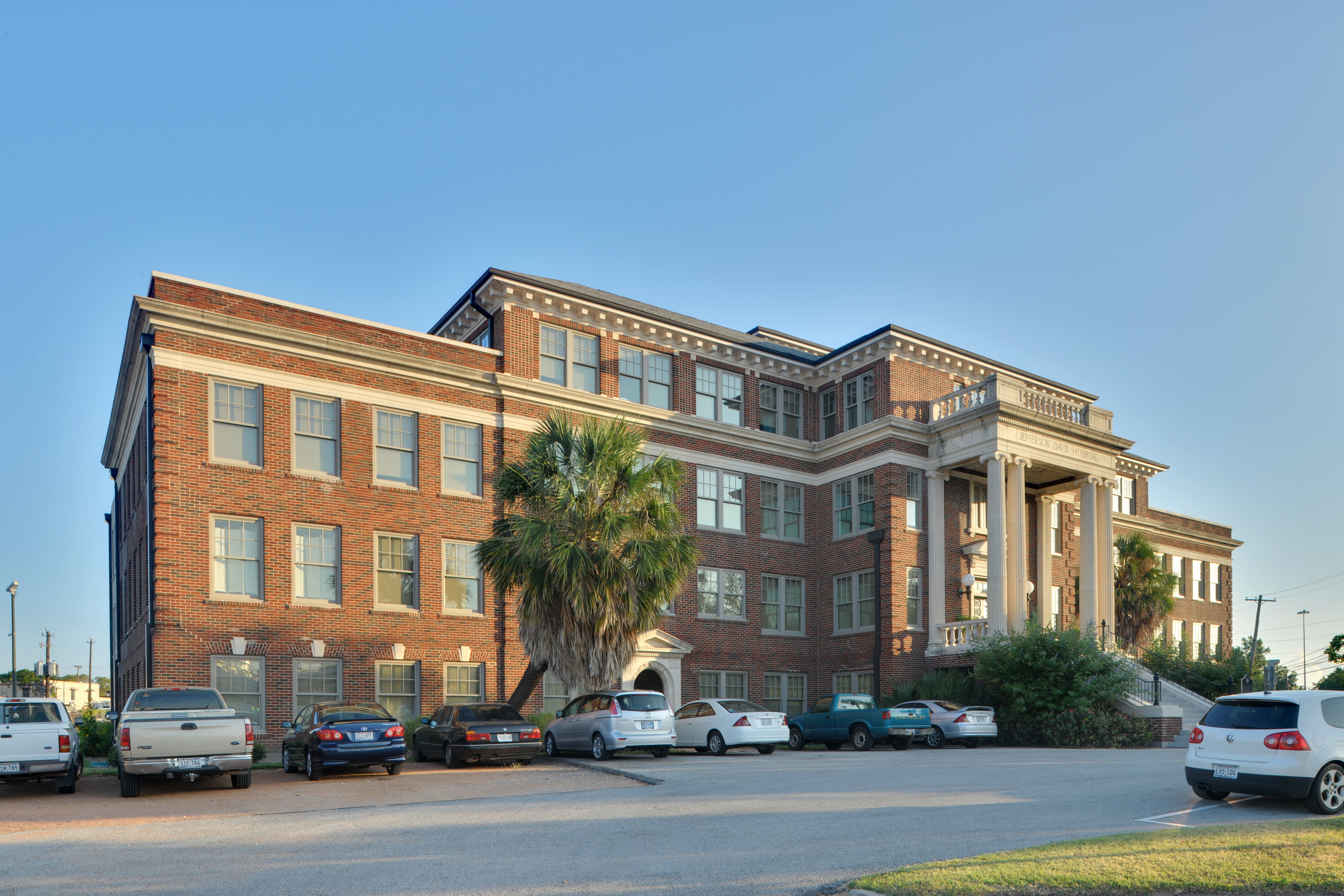
- The renovated building in 2010

- Location within Texas Location within the United States
- Location: 1101 Elder St., Houston, Texas
- Coordinates: 29°46′10″N 95°22′07″W
- Built: 1924; 102 years ago
- Architect: W. A. Dowdy
- Architectural style: Classical Revival
- NRHP reference No.: 05000859
- RTHL No.: 15523
- Designated RTHL: 2008

Jefferson Davis Hospital operated from 1924 to 1989 and was the first centralized municipal hospital to treat indigent patients in Houston, Texas. It is listed in the National Register of Historic Places. The building, located in Houston's Historic First Ward, was designated as a protected historic landmark on November 13, 2013, by the Houston City Council and is monitored by the Historic Preservation Office of the City of Houston Department of Planning and Development. The property has been reoccupied by ArtSpace as the Elder Street Artists Lofts since 2005, which provides 24 live/work units for local artists to rent.

The location of the former hospital has gained notoriety as a stigmatized property due to public perception of its haunted origins.

Prior to the construction of the hospital building, the lot was used as the former municipal cemetery and burial grounds for the City of Houston where thousands of Confederate States Army soldiers, former slaves, and city officials were laid to rest. The municipal cemetery operated on the lot from 1840 until the mid-1890s when it fell into decay, resulting in the reclassification of the lot for use as a municipal hospital by the Houston City Council in the 1920s.

== Architectural style ==
Designed by Wilkes Alfred Dowdy, Architect for the City of Houston, the building for Jefferson Davis Hospital was constructed as a 4-story red brick Classical-revival style structure with handsomely detailed façade that included stone veneers and rows of double-hung windows. The design was considered quite modern at the time of its construction and represented the architectural elements that were favored in the early 1900s for hospital design.

=== Exterior design ===
The cast stone detailing, portico, and brick corner quoins, are elements of the Classical Revival style that was popular in the early 20th century. The building entrance is a square portico that is framed by four monumental Ionic fluted capital and pilaster columns. The front façade features several square rock stone walls that are believed to have been either gravestones salvaged from the original cemetery or flower beds, although neither use has been confirmed. Other neo-classical elements included keystones over the basement windows and keystones over the pedimented entry doors at the basement level.

The architect leveraged high ceilings and rows of numerous large windows to harness sunlight and increase ventilation, thus avoiding the cost of more expensive decorative adornments. The raised placement of the building atop an above-ground basement, paired with the buildings location on a high ridge, enhanced the flow of cross-through breezes. The tall stature of the building emphasized ventilation, which was considered as a method of combating airborne illnesses and increase the spirits of the critically ill and dying who inhabited the facilities. The second and third floors of the building featured two screened balconies to allow patients an opportunity to enjoy fresh-air without having to leave the hospital premises.

=== Interior design ===
In contrast to the lavish exterior, the interior features of the building were simple and unadorned, which appropriately reflected its establishment as a charity hospital for the indigent. Terrazo flooring was featured in the original construction and was included in later restorative efforts. A children's rooftop garden and playground also enhanced the traversable function of the building without increasing its overall size.

In 2005, W.O. Neohaus and Associates in collaboration with Development Partner Avenue Community Development Corporation, underwent a $6.3 million renovation project sponsored by Artspace to restore the building. The original architectural features have been preserved, which included the terrazzi floors, the high ceilings and the large window openings. The project added a partial "green" roof, making it the first Artspace project to feature this environmentally sustainable amenity.

== Occupancy and tenants ==
=== Pre-construction era (1840–1924) ===
Prior to its construction, the property was first used as a municipal cemetery beginning in the 1840s to replace Old City Cemetery, one of the oldest sites in Houston, which was active until the 1880s (a.k.a., Old Houston City Cemetery). Over the next few decades, thousands of people were buried on the site and it became the final resting place for over 6,000 Confederate soldiers, former slaves, and city officials. Also included among the graves were thousands of victims of the yellow fever and cholera epidemics. Use of the location as a cemetery by the city discontinued in 1879, although family burials continued into the 1890s. By the early 1900s, the cemetery was in a gross state of deterioration due to a lack of maintenance, causing the city to reconsider use of the location for public health services.

=== Operating years of Jefferson Davis Hospital (1924–1938) ===
In the early 1920s, the Houston City Council began planning the construction of Jefferson Davis Hospital. Controversy erupted over the proposal that the hospital would disturb the graves of those buried in the former municipal cemetery. When construction began in 1924, the basement of the building was placed above ground in the effort to dispel the public controversy and to leave the graves undisturbed. Although many graves were relocated, later discoveries revealed that there had been no widespread removal of remains.

The hospital was named for Jefferson Davis, former president of the Confederacy, on account of the Confederate soldiers who had been buried in the cemetery and as a means to console the families of the deceased.

Construction was completed in 1924 and the hospital opened its doors to patients in 1925 under the joint operation of the City of Houston and Harris County. However, use of the building as a municipal medical facility was short-lived, lasting only 13 years. By the late 1930s, the rapid metropolitan growth of the Houston area rendered the building inadequate to support the healthcare needs of indigent population.

On January 1, 1938, the city's primary municipal medical services relocated to the area now known as the Texas Medical Center in what was to become Ben Taub General Hospital. The hospital officially closed its doors in 1939.

=== Mixed use (1938–1989) ===
Secondary city-operated medical services were offered in the building until 1939 when the remaining clinical facilities relocated to Buffalo Drive (now known as Allen Parkway) in a facility called Jefferson Davis, which later become a community clinic and psychiatric treatment center. The similarity between the two facilities, Jefferson Davis Hospital and Jefferson Davis on Allen Parkway, has been the source of confusion for many commentators, resulting in false rumors that Jefferson Davis Hospital was once a mental asylum.

During the period following the closing of Jefferson Davis Hospital, the building underwent numerous tenancy transfers. Initial propositions included using the facility as a contagious disease center. The building was first retained by the Harris County Hospital District as a medical records storage facility. Later tenants included a probation office, a convalescent home, a venereal disease clinic, a home for juvenile delinquents, a food stamp distribution site, a drug treatment center and a storage facility for the county from the 1960s to the 1980s until its abandonment.

The probation office also inhabited a building next to the site that is also rumored to be haunted, due to its sharing of the same cemetery as the hospital building, the morgue of the former Jefferson Davis Hospital, and because it is bordered by the black earth graves, which are theorized to have been left by an English colony dating back to the 1600s. Reports of paranormal activity in the probation building have included: noises in the attic, a woman spotted in the upper stories that is believed to have been used as a dormitory for the nurses who worked at Jefferson Davis Hospital, and figures entering the ladies' restroom never to be seen again, and police dogs which refused to enter the building when a fire alarm was triggered.

=== Abandonment and vacancy (1989–2003) ===
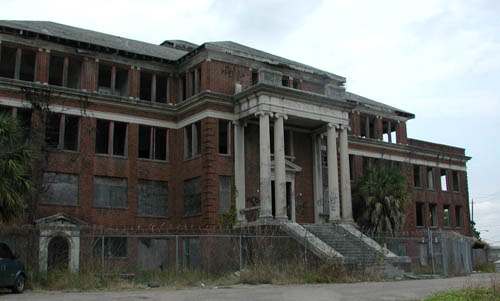
Jefferson Davis Hospital pre-renovation

During the two decade period from 1989 to 2005 > (2008) the building stood vacant and fell into a gradual state of disrepair . The Houston Press remarked on the state of the building's decay in a 2000 article:

Half the windows in the four-story building are boarded up. The rest are wide open to the weather, which, along with a generation or two of vandals and squatters, has wreaked havoc on the inside. Plaster curls off the walls. The dirt-encrusted floors are covered with glass slides stained with indistinguishable bodily fluids. Each room has become the repository for a different type of junk: old gurneys, office furniture, surgical scrubs. A nurse's station is piled waist-high with filthy mattresses. A restroom floor is lined, wall to wall, with bags of plastic cups and lids. Weeds grow out of every crack. Trees have somehow taken root in the concrete sills of blown-out windows."

Senator John Cornyn's office described the building as, "a magnet for gangs and the homeless, as well as an attractive nuisance for youths." Due to its reputation for paranormal activity, the building had garnered tradition among the local population as a landmark that could be broken into on Halloween night for no-cost thrills.

In 1995, the site of the former Jefferson Davis Hospital was listed as a State Archaeological Landmark because of the lot's prior use as a major municipal cemetery.

=== Historical declaration and rehabilitation (2002 to present) ===
In March 2002, the City of Houston Archeological and Historical Commission (HAHC) approved the notion of declaring the building a city landmark.

On June 20, 2002, the Harris County Commissioners approved the sale of Jefferson Davis Hospital to Avenue Community Development Corporation (popularly known as Avenue CDC) and ArtSpace Projects Inc. of Minneapolis, which pledged to rehabilitate the dilapidated property. The building was in a severe state of dilapidation due to its prolonged period of vacancy.

31 July 2003: A group of college students looking for ghosts was robbed on the premises. KTRK Television reports that the robbers fired gunshots at them, but no one was hurt.

Efforts towards rehabilitation began in 2003, resulting in what was to become a substantial $6.3 million renovation project. The project would convert the former hospital quarters into a combined total of 34 artist lofts and residential housing units occupying a total space of 39,000 square feet, now designated as the Elder Street Artist Lofts. Funding for the project was provided in part by the City of Houston, Harris County, Texas, the Texas Department of Housing and Community Development and Avenue Community Development Corporation. The United States Environmental Protection Agency also granted $200,000 for environmental clean-up that included asbestos abatement, lead abatement, and the removal of an underground storage tank. Construction planning commenced in 2003 and work began on September 23, 2004.

Due to the site's designation as a historical landmark and building, the U.S. Department of the Interior carefully monitored the rehabilitation through the Texas Historical Commission. The overall footprint of the interior space was to be preserved and a historically accurate restoration helped to restore the plaster walls, the interior window frames that were designed with curved-corners, and the modillion blocks at the buildings eaves. The concrete ceilings were left exposed and are crisscrossed with a modern intricate weaving of utility conduits, which avoided the need to modify the interior walls. Exterior preservation was also monitored to ensure historical accuracy. An archaeological survey of the property was required to precede construction to be sure that existing graves were not disturbed since the site was a designated State Archaeological Landmark. Many of the exterior bricks had to be replaced and the walls repointed. The roof where the children's garden and playground once sat was replicated with asphalt of a similar color to the original tile that had fallen into severe disrepair.

Restoration was completed on the former Jefferson Davis Hospital building in 2005, although an unrestored building remained on the East side of the property. In 2013, the remaining unrestored portion of the historic Jefferson Davis Hospital Building was destroyed in a two-alarm fire that resulted in one casualty by a Houston firefighter struck by a falling piece of burning tile.

The two floor nurse's quarters, built in the mid-1920s, were designed by W.A. Dowdy, an architect working for the city government. A January 2017 storm damaged the building's roof. Due to the damage it ultimately did not receive historic status, and the county proposed demolition that year.

==== Artist lofts ====
Following its completion the building was renamed the Elder Street Artists Lofts. The 34 residential/studio units were originally intended for only artists' occupancy, but was later opened to the community-at-large. Residents of the City of Houston applauded the rehabilitation, resulting in its recognition as the Best Renovation in the 2006 Best of Houston® issue published by the Houston Press. HGTV presented the developers with a "Restore America award".

The lofts are within the Houston Independent School District (HISD), and the zoned schools are Crockett Elementary School in the Sixth Ward, Hogg Middle School in Woodland Heights, and Heights High School (formerly Reagan High School) in the Houston Heights.

== Popular culture ==
=== Film ===
The former Jefferson Davis Hospital building was featured in the Hollywood production of RoboCop 2 as the location where the fictitious drug "nuke" was manufactured.

== See also ==
- Six wards of Houston
