= First Ward, Houston =

Historic ward of Houston

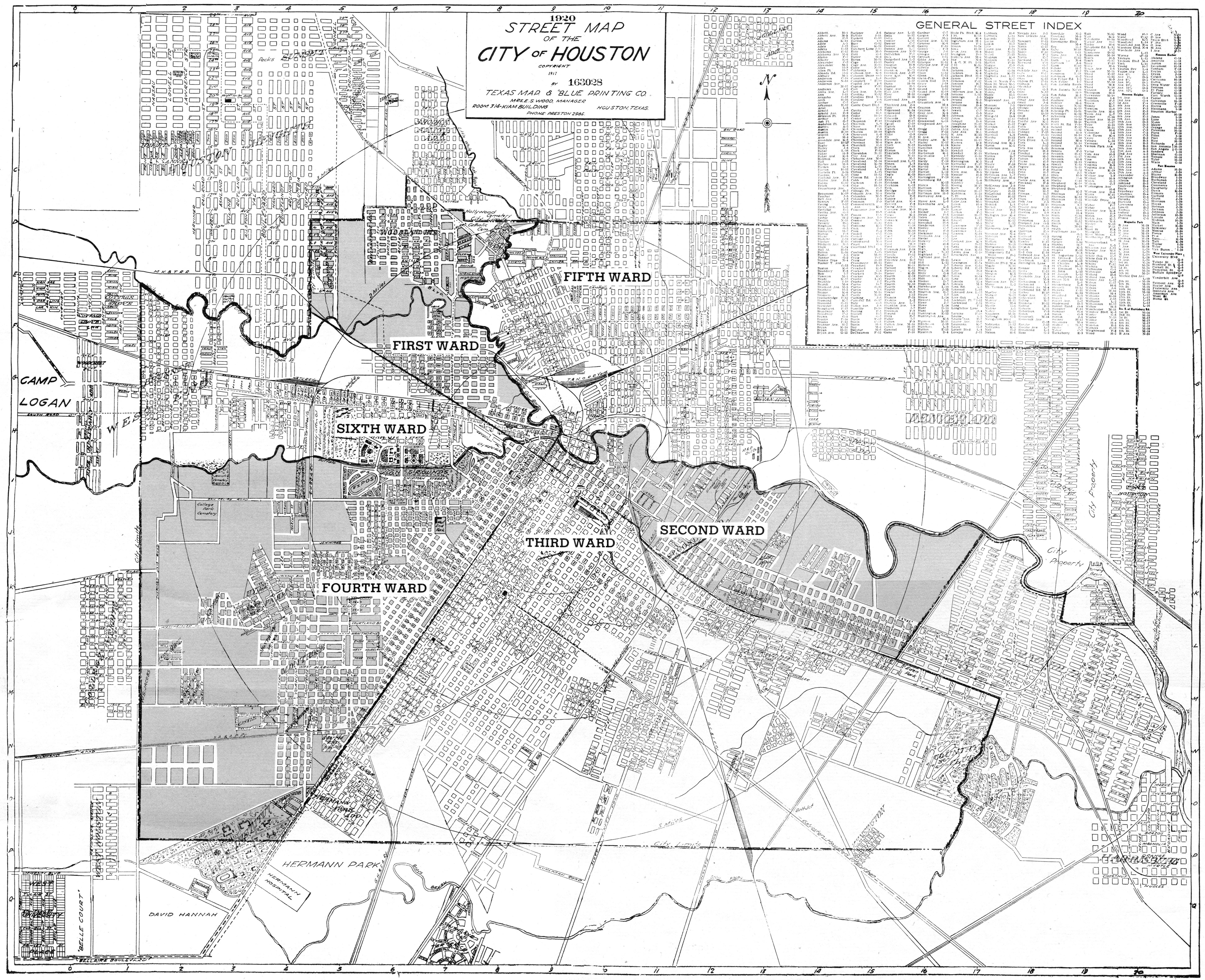
First Ward of Houston as shown on a map from 1920

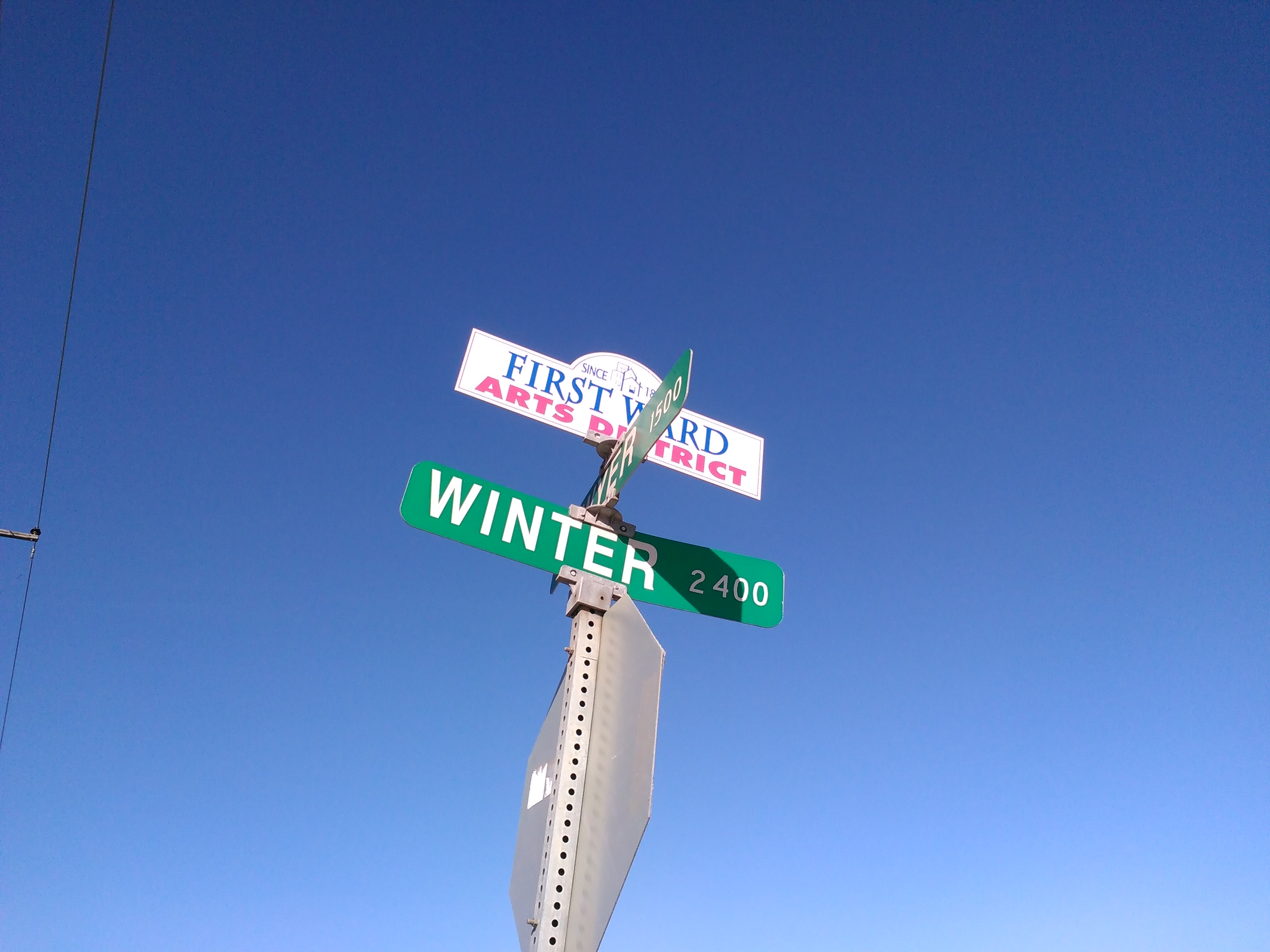
First Ward sign

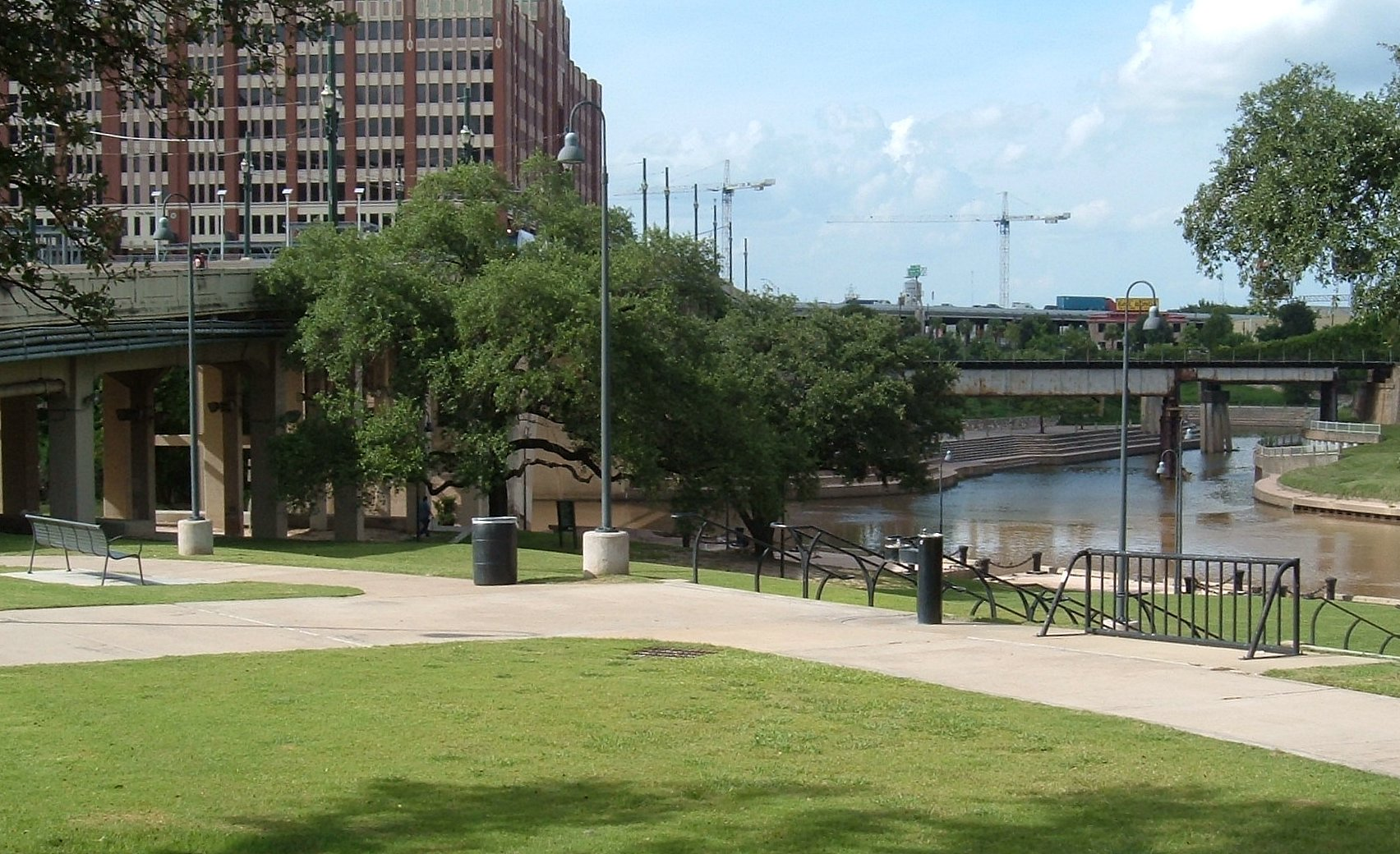
Allen's Landing park at Buffalo Bayou and White Oak in the First Ward.

The First Ward of Houston, which is located inside the 610 Loop, is one of the city's historic wards. It was originally the center of the business district for the city, and was strategically located at the intersection of Buffalo Bayou and White Oak Bayou, near an area now known as Allen's Landing. It was one of the original four wards in Houston when it was created in 1840. It was defined as all area within the city limits of Houston (which was much smaller at the time) north of Congress Street and west of Main Street.

In 1866 First Ward land to the north and east of White Oak Bayou and Little White Oak Bayou was split off to create part of the Fifth Ward. Just prior to the abolition of the ward system in 1907 the Woodland Heights neighborhood was developed in what was then the northwest corner of the ward, just north of White Oak Bayou.

In 1987, Kim Cobb of the Houston Chronicle said "It's hard to find any vestige of the old First Ward, since it's covered by downtown office buildings." In 2006, the last remaining houses of a former residential neighborhood were vacated and bulldozed, replaced by the 23-acre (9.3 ha) Sawyer Heights Village, a shopping center that includes a Target. Part of the remaining 19th and 20th century bungalows and cottages was named the High First Ward Historic District in 2014. The rest of the residential sections of the ward have seen construction of numerous lofts and townhomes in the 21st century.

== Economy ==
The ward's economic base was heavily industrial for much of its history, and industrial service companies including Matheson and Tejas Materials still employ hundreds. However, the ward is today primarily known as an arts district, with Spring Street Studios, Winter Street Studios, and Sawyer Yards (converted from a Mahatma Rice facility in 2015) all operating within a few blocks of each other. The aforementioned Sawyer Heights Village shopping center provides the area's commercial anchor.

== Government, historical sites, and transportation ==
Jefferson Davis Hospital was built in the First Ward in 1924. It was built on the site of a former Confederate cemetery, leading to rumors the site was haunted. The hospital building was converted to subsidized housing for artists in 2005, and was designated a historic landmark in 2013.

The former Barbara Jordan Post Office, which is currently being redeveloped into a commercial and entertainment hub named Post HTX, is located within the boundaries of the ward. The same site was also home to Houston's Grand Central Station in the early 20th century.

The Houston Fire Department houses fleet maintenance and arson investigation facilities on Dart Street.

Transit includes the Houston Amtrak station near Washington Avenue and five Metro bus routes.

Harris Health System (formerly Harris County Hospital District) designated Casa de Amigos Health Center in the Near Northside for ZIP code 77007. The nearest public hospital is Ben Taub General Hospital in the Texas Medical Center.

== Education ==
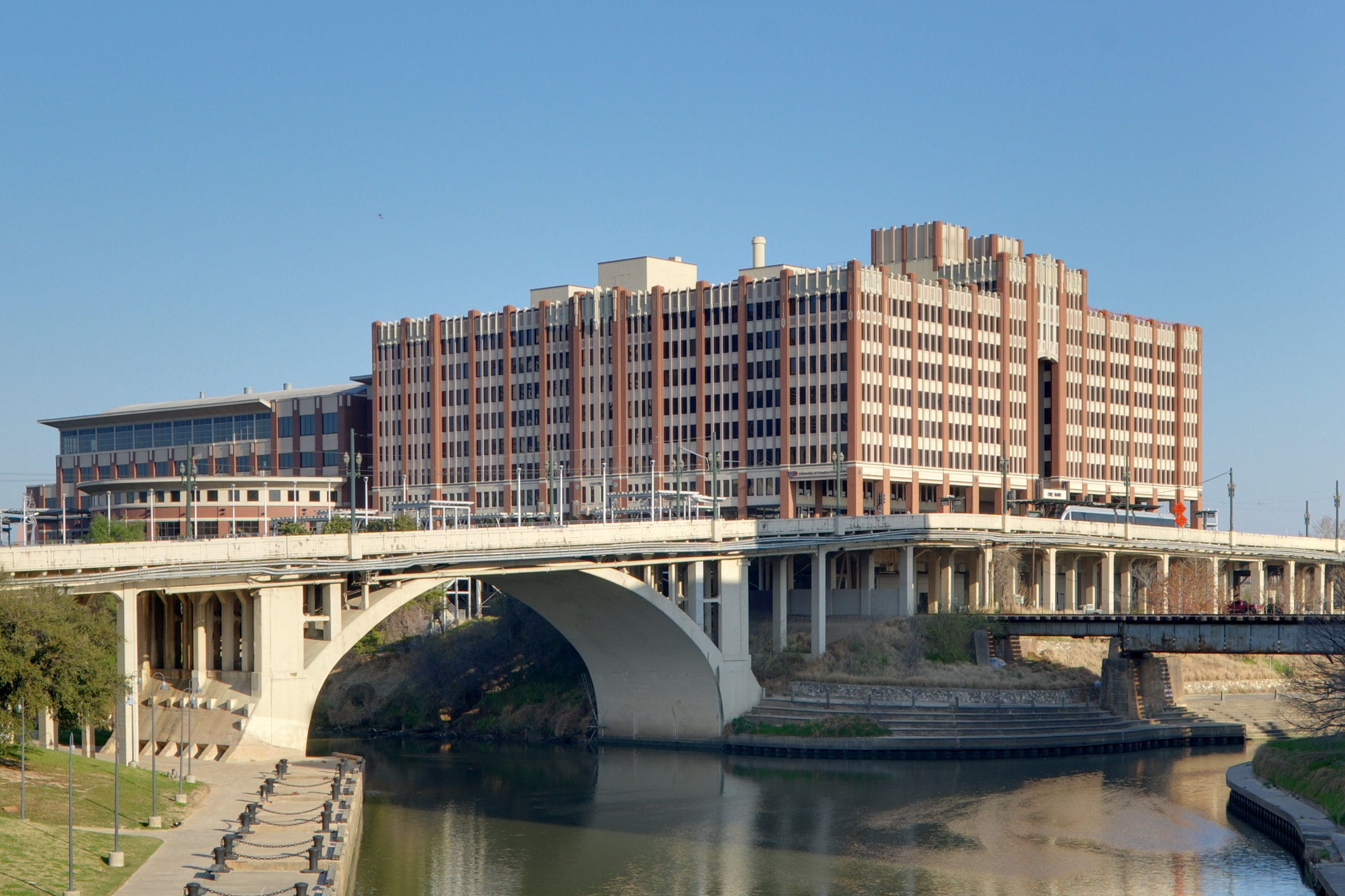
University of Houston–Downtown

The First Ward is within the Houston Independent School District; the part of the First Ward not within Downtown is zoned to Crockett Elementary School, Hogg Middle School, and Reagan High School.

Hawthorne Elementary School used to serve the First Ward; it opened in 1893, replacing Houston Avenue School (which was later known as the First Ward School), and closed in 1959. Richard Brock Elementary School opened on the former Hawthorne site in 1967. In 2006 it was converted to the Crockett Early Childhood Center. Crockett took the attendance territory formerly held by Brock.

The University of Houston–Downtown (UHD) is a four-year state university, located within the historic First Ward. Founded in 1974, it is one of four separate and distinct institutions in the University of Houston System. UHD has an enrollment of 12,900 students—making it the 13th largest public university in Texas and the second-largest university in the Houston area.

== Religion ==
The Roman Catholic Archdiocese of Galveston-Houston operates nearby St. Joseph-St. Stephen Church in the 6th Ward.

St. Stephen Church in the First Ward, which had a congregation with many Mexican immigrants, occupied what Lisa Gray of the Houston Chronicle referred to as "a modest church building" and was in an area experiencing gentrification. It closed in 2016 when it was merged with St. Joseph Church. In 2018, and 2019, there were protests advocating that the archdiocese reopen the church. The leadership of the Catholic church overruled the archdiocese and ordered the church to reopen, but as of 2019 no such reopening has yet occurred.

== See also ==
- Six wards of Houston
