= Harvard Elementary School (Texas) =

Public primary school in Houston, Texas

Coordinates: 29.7862°N 95.3959°W

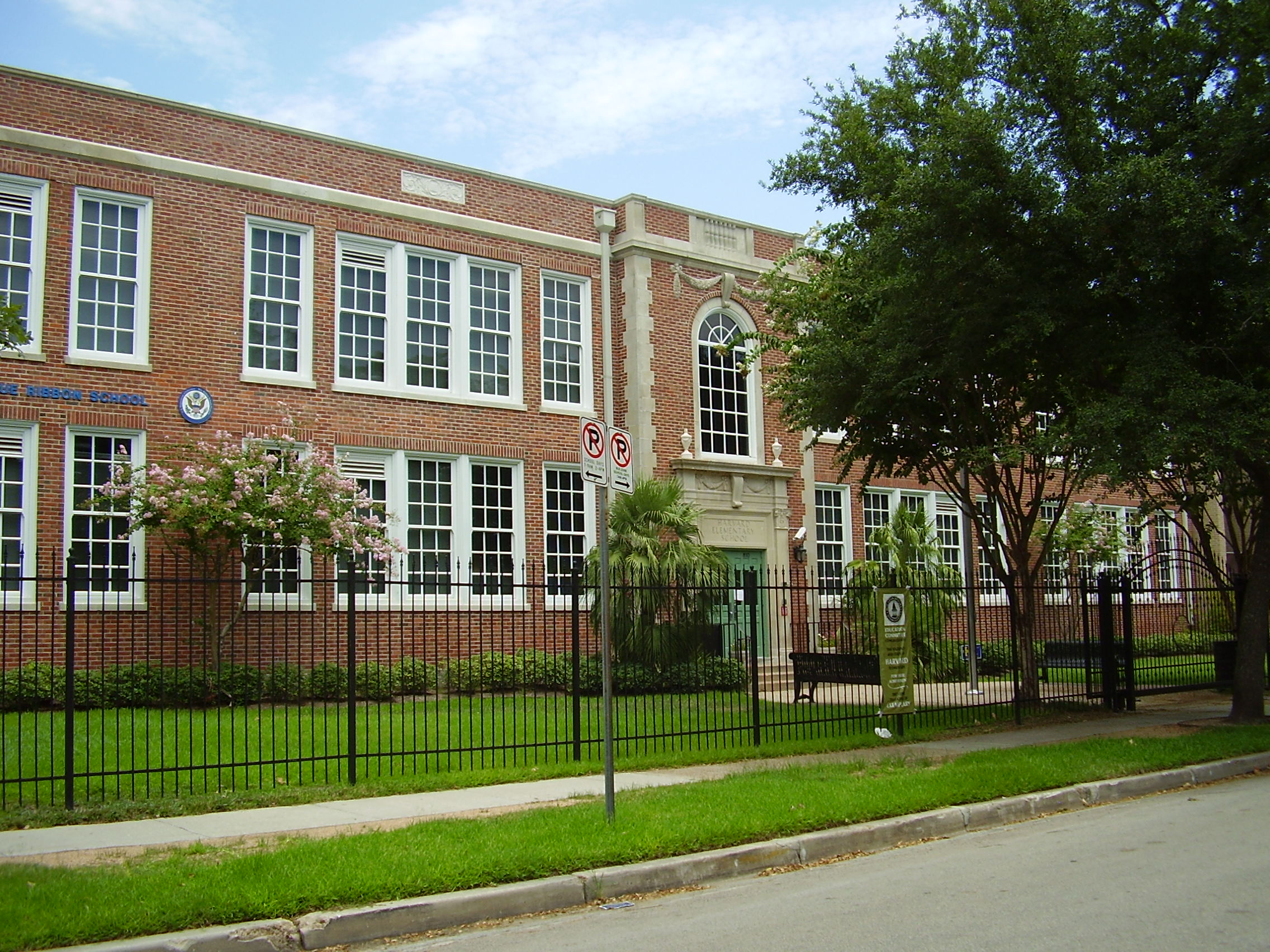
Harvard Elementary School

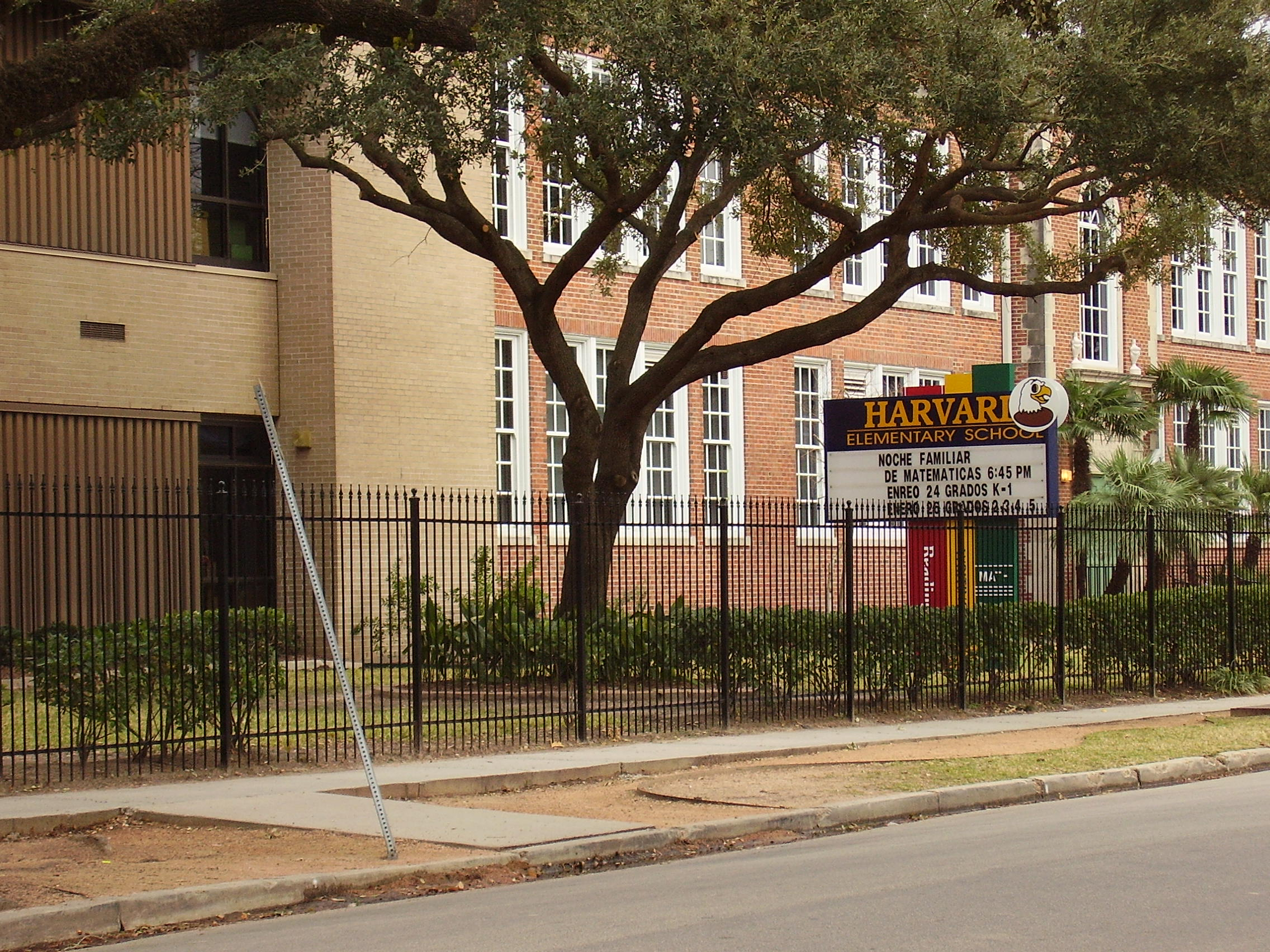
Harvard Elementary School

Harvard Elementary School is a public primary school in the Houston Heights neighborhood of Houston, Texas, United States. Harvard, a part of the Houston Independent School District, serves grades Pre-Kindergarten through 5.

Harvard Elementary School, located in the Houston Heights block 248, serves a portion of the community.

As of 2013, Harvard is the oldest continuously operating school in Houston.

== History ==
Harvard opened as Harvard Street School on September 18, 1898, serving the South-End area of the Houston Heights. The school received a main brick structure when it was constructed in 1911; at that time it was renamed to its current name, without the word "Street".

In 1921, the school became a part of the Houston Independent School District.

Harvard was previously reserved for white children but it desegregated by 1970.

In 1980, the original brick structure was demolished and the school received a new addition.

In 2004, the school's attendance boundary, along with that of Travis Elementary School of Woodland Heights, was modified due to a vehicular traffic increase on Studewood Street, affecting 20 children. The adjustment was done so children would not have to cross the street.

Prior to 2006, the Harvard building was under-utilized. In 2006 a group of area parents asked Harvard principal Kevin Beringer to help them improve the school. By 2008, Harvard became in-demand and had parents requesting to have houses zoned to Harvard; because of its popularity it developed a waiting list for prospective students and area property values increased.

The school was named a National Blue Ribbon School in 2008.

== Demographics ==
In 2004, 80% of the students were classified as low income, and 80% of the students were Hispanic or Latino. Kevin Beringer, the principal, established an International Baccalaureate program after several area parents made requests to see improvements at the school.

By 2014, the percentage of low income students declined to 30%, and 40% of the students were non-Hispanic white.

By 2016, 45% of the students were non-Hispanic white, 41% were Hispanic or Latino, and 21% were low income.

== School uniforms ==
Harvard Elementary School requires its students to wear school uniforms. The Texas Education Agency specified that the parents and/or guardians of students zoned to a school with uniforms may apply for a waiver to opt out of the uniform policy so their children do not have to wear the uniform; parents must specify "bona fide" reasons, such as religious reasons or philosophical objections.

== Feeder patterns ==
People zoned to Harvard Elementary School are also zoned to Hogg Middle School and Heights High School (formerly Reagan High School).
