= Booker T. Washington High School (Houston) =

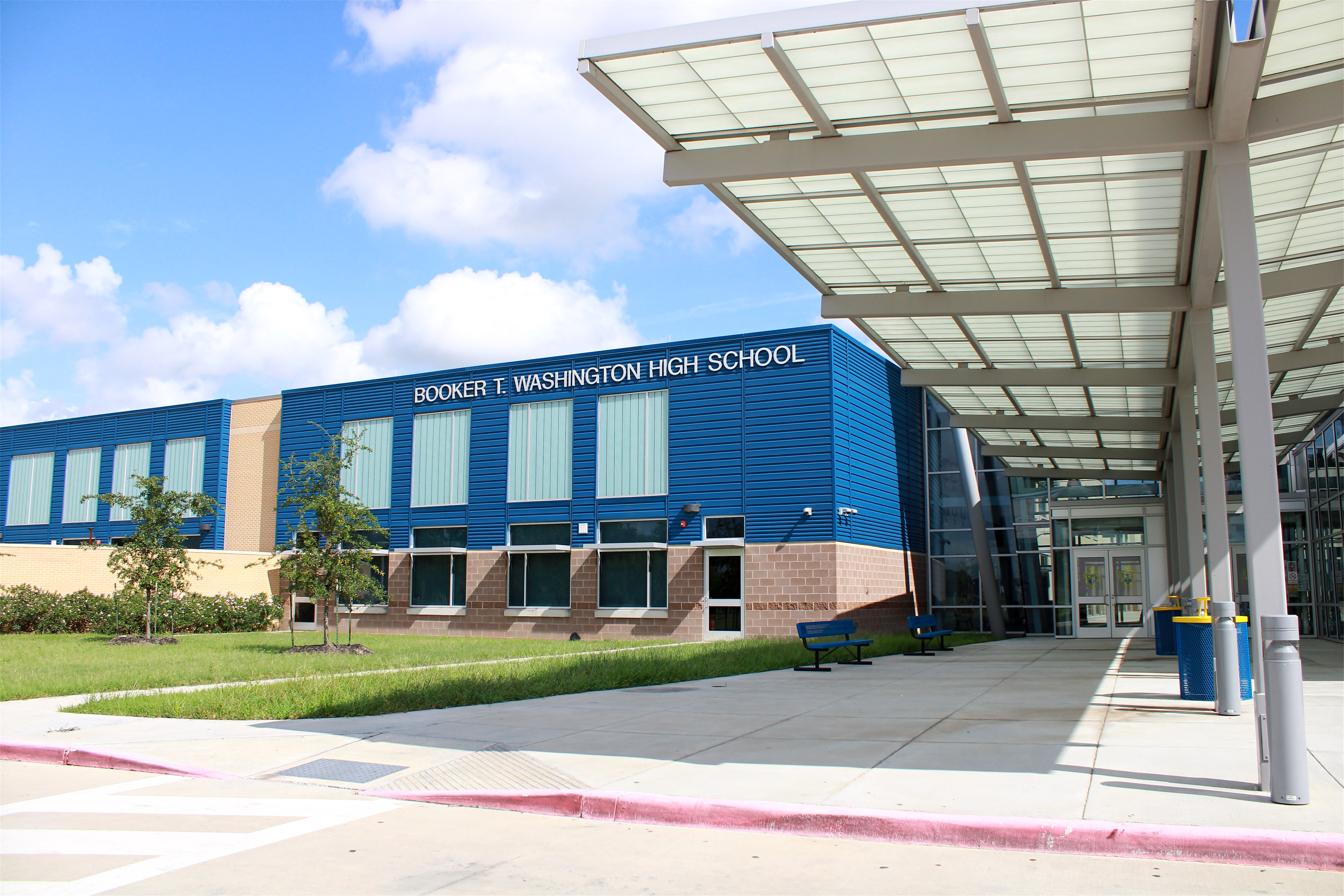

Location
- 4204 Yale Street; Houston, Texas 77018; United States; 29.821837°N 95.398854°W

Information
- Established: 1893
- Principal: Carlos Phillips II
- Staff: 87.87 (FTE)
- Enrollment: 837 (2023–2024)
- Student to teacher ratio: 9.53
- Colors: Blue and gold
- Mascot: Golden Eagle
- Website: washington.houstonisd.org

Booker T. Washington High School (nicknamed "Booker T.") is a secondary school located in the Independence Heights community in Houston, Texas. Washington serves grades 9 through 12, and is a part of the Houston Independent School District. The school has a neighborhood program that serves neighborhoods outside the 610 Loop and inside Beltway 8 in the northwest part of Houston, including the neighborhoods of Independence Heights, Highland Heights, and most of Acres Homes. The school was named after education pioneer Booker T. Washington.

The High School For Engineering Professions is located on the campus.

== History ==
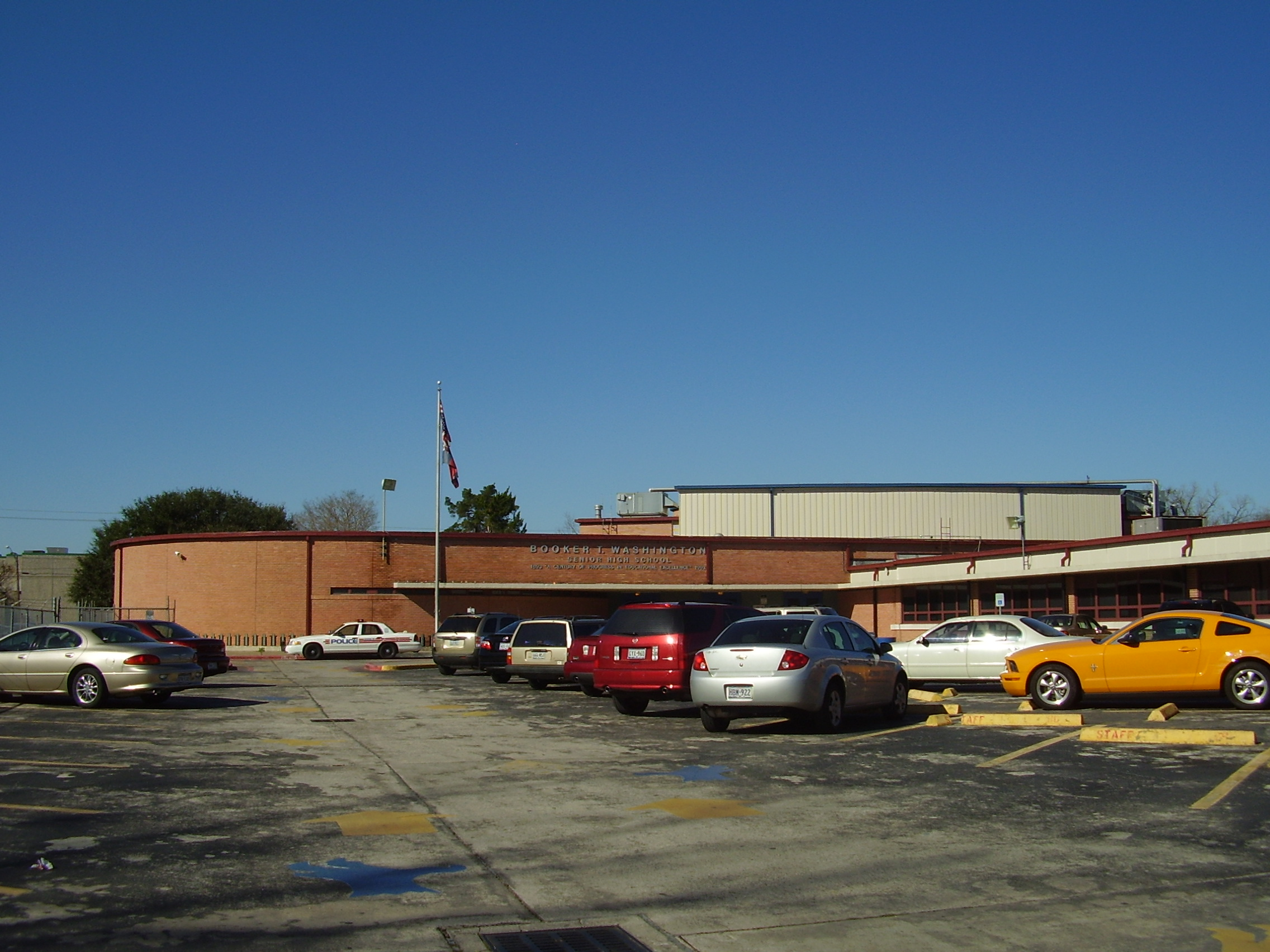
Former campus

The school was established in 1893 in Houston's Fourth Ward as "Colored High." The first location for the school, 303 West Dallas, is considered to be within Downtown Houston as of 2007. Originally it was the only secondary school for black people in the city; at the time schools were segregated by race.

A 1923 Houston Informer article stated that the school building was in bad repair, calling it a "rat trap".

In 1925 the school board stated that it would build a new black high school due to the increasing black population. The Houston Informer stated that the schools need to be named after prominent black people from the city and/or other successful black persons. The original colored high school was renamed after Booker T. Washington, a famous black educator who became the namesake of many black schools in the Southern United States. The school was given its current name in 1928. Washington was relieved by the construction and opening of Yates and Wheatley high schools in the 1920s.

The school moved to its current location in Independence Heights in 1959. Lockett Junior High School, which closed in June 1968, was established in the former Washington campus. The school desegregated by 1970.

After Franklyn Wesley retired as principal in June 2007, Houston ISD chose Mark Bedell, formerly an assistant principal at Worthing High School, as the principal. Victor Keys, an assistant principal and an alumna of Washington, would remain as an assistant principal. Some alumni of Washington High School and members of the community around the school protested the decision to hire Bedell because they wished for the district to hire Keys instead of Bedell. The current Washington principal is Carlos Phillips II.

Wesley died September 11, 2007, at age 88. He served as the principal of the campus for more than 40 years, and worked as an educator for more than 65 years, spending all of but 10 of those years in HISD.

In February 2012, because the school population was at a historic low of 823, several members of the Independence Heights community, led by Sylvester Turner, a Texas Legislature representative, advocated for reinvestment in the school. They advocated for making Washington competitive with Reagan High School and Waltrip High School. The leaders argue that HISD had neglected the school. Turner and Washington High School officials established a donation campaign. As of January 19, 2012, the campaign raised $135,000. Kroger donated $10,000 of the funds.

Around 2012, each year 400 students from Booker T. Washington transferred to Reagan and Waltrip.

By 2015, the district purchased several houses around the high school as part of its program to rebuild the high school. After criminals began taking parts from the houses, residents argued that the way the houses were acquired could attract criminality.

Using funds from the Houston ISD 2012 bond, the district constructed a new building for the school, which opened at the beginning of the 2018–2019 school year.

== Academics ==
In 2011 the Texas Education Agency (TEA) gave the overall school an "unacceptable" rating. 51% of the school's 9th grade students passed the Texas Assessment of Knowledge and Skills mathematics portion.

In 2012 Houston Community College established an auto mechanic program at Booker T. Washington. The previous auto mechanic program closed around 1997. Before 2012 the auto shop had been filled with waste. The Houston Independent School District paid $300,000 to restore the auto shop.

In 2012 Texas A&M University and Booker T. Washington partnered to give university scholarships to some engineering students.

In 2019 the TEA gave the school an overall rating of 'C', with grades of 'D' and 'C' in Student Achievement and School Progress respectively.

== Campus ==
Sylvester Turner advocated for the replacement of the gymnasium floors; they were replaced in the northern hemisphere fall of 2011. Turner said in February 2012 that the campus needed an overhaul greater than the $3.8 million that the district allotted to the school as a result of the previous bond election.

== Attendance zone ==
One Houston Housing Authority (HHA) subsidized housing complex, Lincoln Park, is zoned to the school.

== Transportation ==
Houston ISD provides school bus transportation to students who live more than two miles away from the school. Students zoned to the school and students who are enrolled in the magnet program are eligible for bus transportation.

The METRO city bus line also operates the 66 Yale bus line, which stops at the intersection of Yale Street and Cockerel Street.

== Student body ==
Washington had 1,520 students in 1995, about 900 students in 2010, and 823 students in February 2012, a historic low based on population statistics of the area.

In the 2011–2012 school year, the magnet school, with a capacity of 400 students, had 226 students.

== School uniforms ==
As of 2020 Washington has a school uniform policy.

Washington requires its students to feel free in the environment as long as its appropriate.

The Texas Education Agency specified that the parents and/or guardians of students zoned to a school with school uniforms (the definition includes dress codes which limit colors) may apply for a waiver to opt out of the uniform policy so their children do not have to wear the uniform. However, parents must specify "bona fide" reasons, such as religious reasons or philosophical objections.

== Feeder patterns ==
The following elementary schools feed into Washington High School:

- Burrus
- Hohl
- Kennedy
- Wesley
- Garden Oaks (partial)
- Highland Heights (partial)
- Osborne (partial)
- Roosevelt (partial)

Most of M.C. Williams Middle School and small parts of Black Middle School and Alexander Hamilton Middle School feed into Booker T. Washington.

== Notable alumni ==
- J. V. Cain (class of 1969), former NFL tight end for St. Louis Cardinals
- Samuel A. Countee (class of 1928), painter and sculptor
- Eldridge Dickey (class of 1964), former quarterback/wide receiver for the AFL Oakland Raiders; in 1968 became the first African-American Quarterback to be selected in the first round of a professional football draft
- Nate Hawkins, former NFL wide receiver for the Houston Oilers
- Mercury Hayes (class of 1992), former NFL wide receiver/kick returner for the New Orleans Saints, Atlanta Falcons, and Washington Redskins practice squad.
- Jennifer Holliday (class of 1978), Grammy award-winning singer and actress.
- Lawrence Marshall (class of 1951) - Former board member for Houston Independent School District
- Leonard Mitchell (class of 1977) - Former NFL defensive end and offensive tackle
- Speedy Thomas (class of 1965) - Former NFL receiver for the Cincinnati Bengals, and New Orleans Saints.

== See also ==
- History of the African-Americans in Houston
- List of things named after Booker T. Washington
