= Norhill, Houston =

Coordinates: 29.790°N 95.384°W

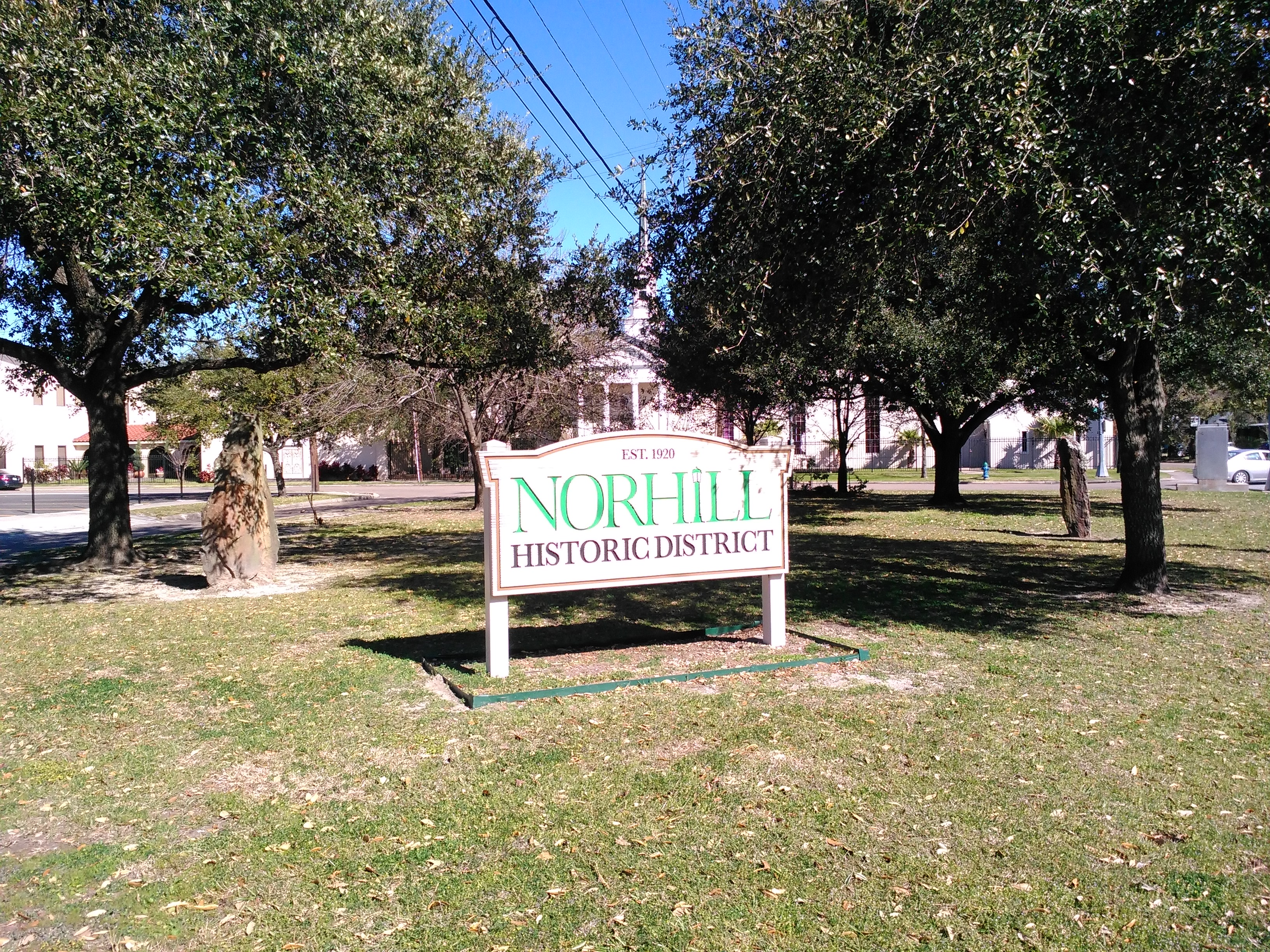
Norhill sign

Norhill, Houston is an historic neighborhood in northwest-central Houston, TX (USA). It is adjacent to the more widely known Houston Heights neighborhood as well as Woodland Heights. Norhill is distinguished by its prevalence of bungalows and the green spaces known as esplanades.

== History ==
Developed in 1920 by William C. Hogg, Norhill is divided into Norhill, North Norhill, and East Norhill. The pastureland on which the neighborhood was built was originally owned by Henry Stude who purchased the land in 1873. Following Stude's passing in 1905, his widow and children traded the land for stock in the Stude Holding Association which voted shortly thereafter to subdivide the land. By 1920, the Association had teamed with Hogg and changed their name to Varner Realty Company. The name Varner is reported to have come from “Varner Plantation”, the retirement home of Hogg's father James Stephen Hogg, former Texas Governor. William C. Hogg was both Chairman of the City Planning Commission and a wealthy investor. He played an important role influencing the growth of Houston during the 1920s.

Norhill was first developed in 1920 with 388 lots bordered by Studewood, Usener, Michaux, and Pecore Streets. North Norhill was developed next, in May 1923, with 555 lots in an area bordered by Studewood, North Main, Michaux, and Pecore Streets. East Norhill was developed in June 1924 with 292 lots bordered by Michaux, Fugate, Moss, and Key Streets. Accessible by both streetcar and auto, Norhill grew with residents at a time when Houston's population was booming and quality housing was in demand for working-class citizens. Lots were advertised for "White or Caucasian race only."

== Architecture ==
Bungalows in Norhill were commonly built from commercially available plans sold through catalogs such as Ladies' Home Journal or Sears Roebuck and Co. and could be easily constructed on 50 by 100 foot lots. With rooms that open up to each other and covered porches that provide an outdoor living space, the bungalow was an ideal home for Houston's often warm and humid climate. As was popular during this time, Norhill homes were often built from a kit shipped directly to the lot containing all of the building materials needed for a particular design.

Today, Norhill remains a “concentrated intact collection of houses built in various bungalow styles, many of which feature low-pitched roofs, simple designs, and trademark porches anchored by brick pillars and tapered wood columns." Represented bungalow styles include Colonial, Spanish, Hipped, English and Craftsman. Whereas the neighboring Houston Heights has many historic homes with Victorian flourishes, Norhill bungalows are generally distinguished by cleaner lines with minimal ornamentation.

== Greenspace ==
Hogg's interest in weaving green areas into housing developments is apparent. The Norhill esplanades are not unlike those incorporated into Hogg's development of the affluent River Oaks neighborhood. The long green esplanades lend a park-like feel to Norhill Boulevard, a north–south residential street which runs through much of the neighborhood. Hogg also incorporated space for a park into the layout. Sold to the City of Houston for $1.00, this area was developed into Proctor Plaza Park.

== Historic District Designation ==
Through the efforts of Norhill's residents and what is now known as the Norhill Neighborhood Association, (formerly Proctor Plaza Neighborhood Association encompassing North and East Norhill) North Norhill and East Norhill were designated a Historic District in 2000 by the City of Houston and the Houston Archaeological and Historical Commission.

== Public schools ==
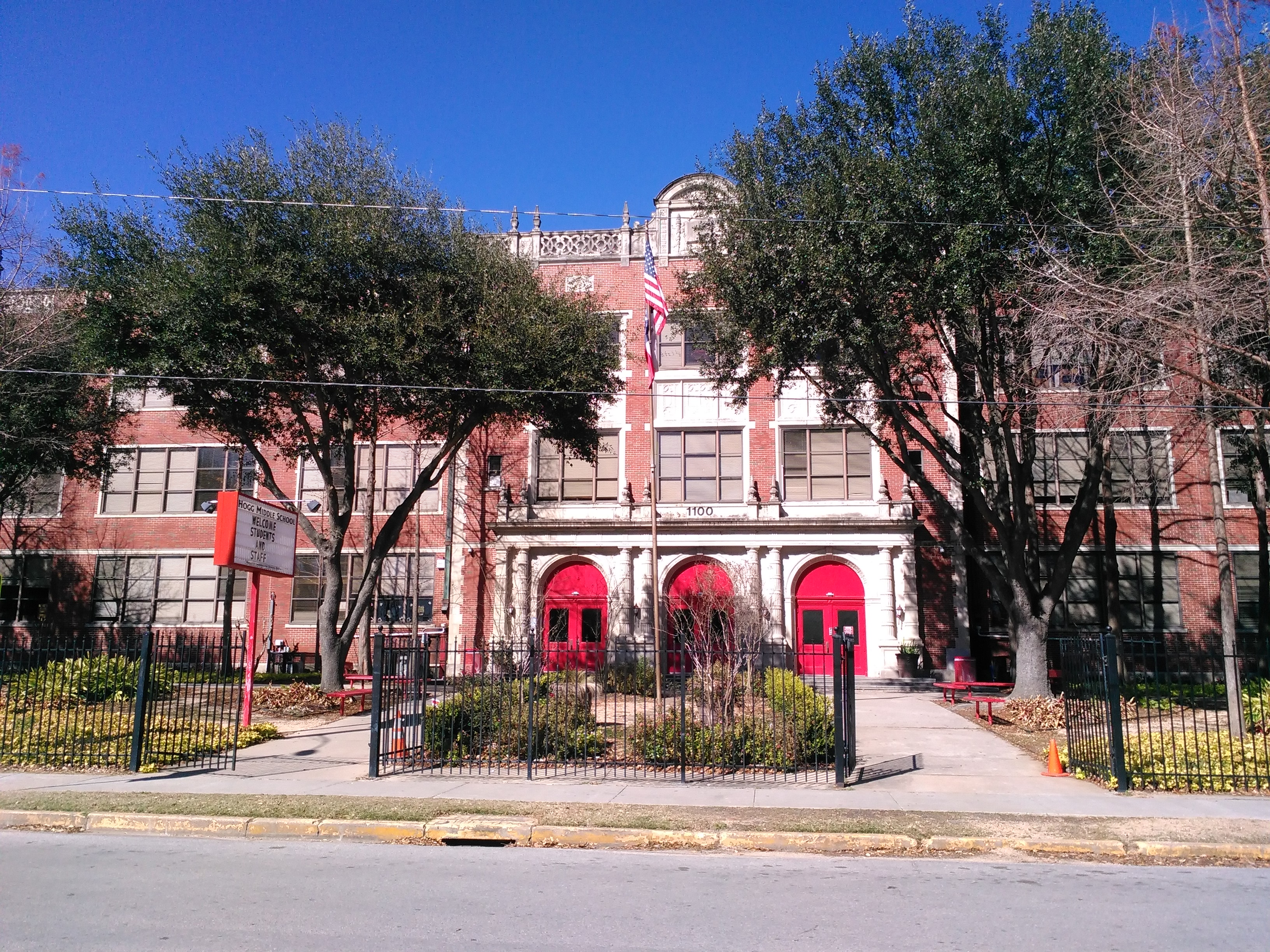
Hogg Middle School

The Norhill neighborhood is within the bounds of the Houston Independent School District.

Elementary schools serving sections of Norhill include Browning (between 11th Street and 14th Street), Field (north of 14th Street), and Travis in Woodland Heights (Norhill areas south of 11th Street). James S. Hogg Middle School, the zoned middle school, offers a magnet program for math, science, technology and robotics, while Heights High School (formerly Reagan High School), the zoned high school, features the district's magnet school of computer technology.

== Infrastructure ==
Harris Health System (formerly Harris County Hospital District) designated Casa de Amigos Health Center in Northside for the ZIP code 77009. The nearest public hospital is Ben Taub General Hospital in the Texas Medical Center.

== Parks and recreation ==
Proctor Plaza Park is in East Norhill block 213.

== Biannual Norhill Bungalow Home Tour ==
Every other year, the Norhill Neighborhood presents a home tour featuring fine examples of Norhill bungalow architecture as a means to raise funds for the association. The last Norhill Bungalow Home Tour was held on Saturday, October 15, 2022.
