= Travis Elementary School (Houston) =

Public elementary school in Texas, USA

William B. Travis Elementary School
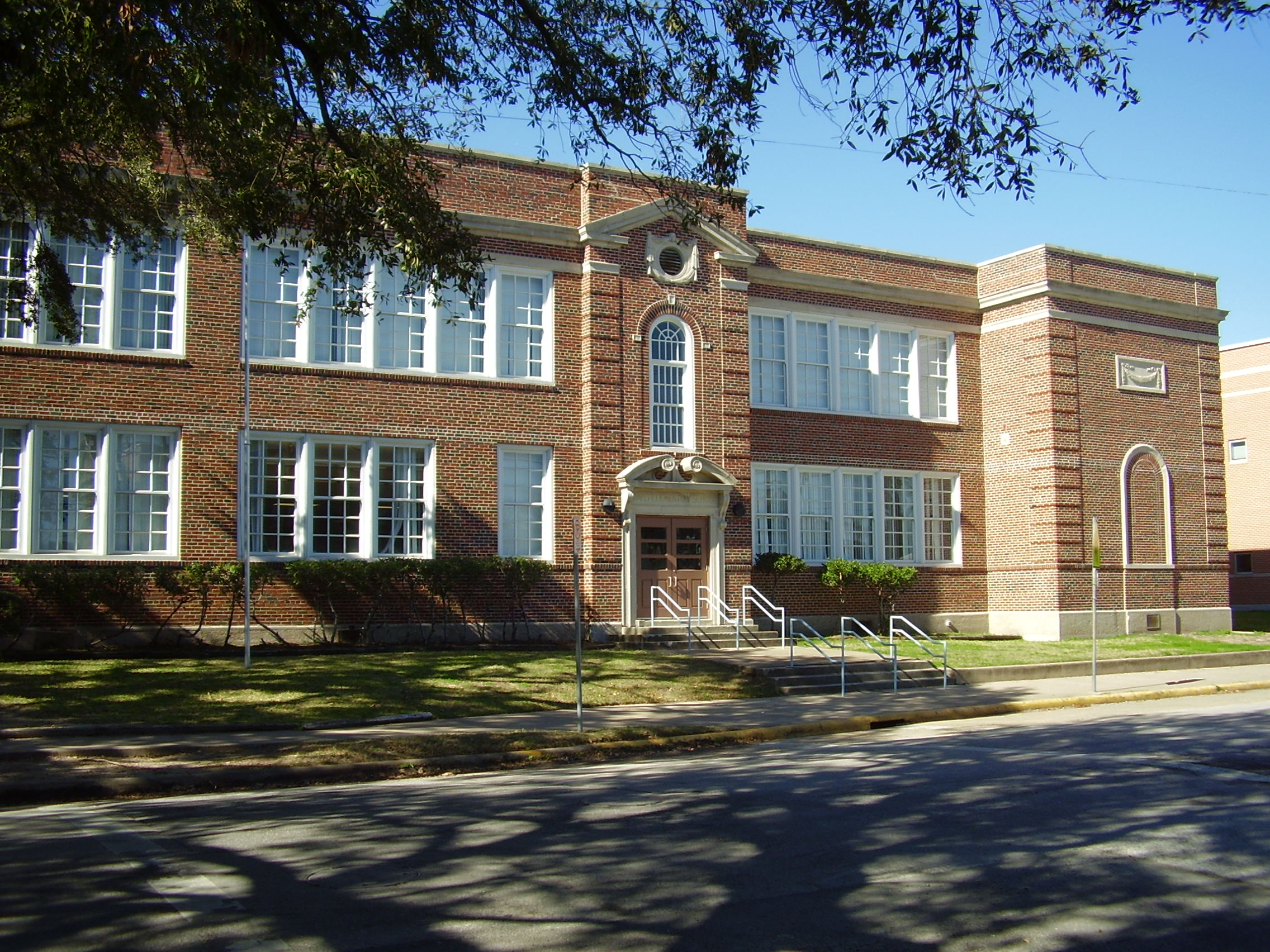

Location
- 3311 Beauchamp Houston, TX 77009-6699; Woodland Heights, Houston, Texas; United States
- 29°47′21″N 95°22′28″W

Information
- Type: Elementary school
- Established: 1908
- Website: houstonisd.org/Domain/22957

William B. Travis Elementary School is a public elementary school in the Woodland Heights area of Houston, Texas. It is a part of the Houston Independent School District (HISD).

It was one of the first HISD schools to have a garden, as well as an outdoor classroom. The garden was established after a teacher received a grant from a national gardening organization.

In addition to Woodland Heights, it serves sections of Norhill south of 11th Street.

== History ==
The first iteration of the school was Beauchamp Springs School, built in 1903. It was later renamed after William Barrett Travis, a participant in the Texas Revolution. The first building with the name Travis Elementary was constructed in 1908. The three-story building had 12 classrooms, and construction ended in 1909. The playground space was donated to the city of Houston and was considered to be larger than that of most schools. In 1926 a new campus was constructed. It had a cafeteria, an auditorium, and 12 classrooms.

Travis was previously reserved for white children, but in 1971, plans to desegregate were implemented. In the 1970s an addition was built, and the campus at that time had 69,000 square feet (6,400 m^{2}) of space.

Circa 1985 the school had about 300 students. Margaret Blackstone, a teacher at Travis, stated that between 1985 and 2006 the school improved due to the establishment of a magnet program and the improvement of area neighborhoods resulting from an influx of educated professionals. By 2002 the school had 637 students. By 2006 Travis had about 700 students, and by 2011 it was near capacity around 730 students.

In 2004 the school's attendance boundary, along with that of Harvard Elementary School of the Houston Heights, was modified due to a vehicular traffic increase on Studewood Street, affecting 20 children. The adjustment was done so children would not have to cross the street. The boundaries between Travis and Crockett Elementary School in the Sixth Ward were also adjusted.

By 2005 Travis was scheduled to receive a renovation of the 1926 building and a replacement of the former addition, designed by Taft Architects, located north of the original building. The project, a part of the 2002 HISD Bond, had a total cost of $14.5 million. The campus altogether was to have room for 750 students. Travis students resided in 24 temporary buildings, labeled "Camp Travis," on the grounds of Ketelsen Elementary School in the Near Northside while construction work occurred on the Travis campus. The renovation and construction was scheduled for completion in 2006. As a result of the construction project the building space at Travis increased to 69,000 square feet (6,400 m^{2}). The new building was dedicated on October 25, 2006.

Even though the school originated in 1903, it chose to hold its official 100 year anniversary in 2008, reflecting the establishment year of 1908.

== Campus ==
The school building, on Woodland Heights block 5, has 32 classrooms, an art room, a cafeteria, a computer laboratory, a dance (creative movement) room, a library, a multi-purpose room, a music room, and a science laboratory. There is also an outdoor classroom. The classrooms are grouped by grade level. The facility's first floor has the cafeteria, library, multi-purpose, and music rooms while the art, dance, computer, and science rooms are on the second floor.

== Curriculum ==
As of 2015 the school's classes use "Present Time Kids" (PTK), a program in which children do listening and breathing exercises for about five minutes at the start of every school day. Principal Tom Day read about the program in Time and this made him decide to implement it.

== Operations ==
The school organizes the Spring Auction and Dinner ever year in order to fund enrichment programs and projects serving the school. Houston socialite Carolyn Farb wrote in The Fine Art of Fundraising: Secrets for Successful Volunteers that the volunteers manning the event were "very proficient at fundraising".

Each year the Travis Elementary Halloween Carnival serves as a fundraiser.

== Demographics ==
In 2005 Travis had 650 students; 55% of them were Hispanic, 40% were White, and 5% were Asian and/or Black.

== Parks and recreation ==
The school park is in the south portion of the campus. The park became a "SPARK Park", a park in which the City of Houston partnered with HISD to develop it, in 1991. The park has a dinosaur sculpture called the "Travisaurus". Paul Kittelson, an area artist, designed it. There was a 2003, $70,000 project to add several features to the park. One was a mural, two stories tall, depicting prehistoric plants and sea creatures. It was made by Dale Barton, an artist who was the parent of a child at Travis. The other items were picnic tables and a climbing wall. By 2011 the Woodland Heights Civic Association had established a park renovation program, with $10,000 contributed by the association itself, $90,000 from a Community Development Block Grant from the federal government, and over $60,000 from community fundraising. In 2003 the Project for Public Spaces ranked Travis's park as a "Best New Park".

The school amphitheater, Mary Jo Klosterman Memorial Outdoor Classroom, may house five classes at one time. During the mid-2000s renovation it was expanded. A sculpture of a cow, called "Mother Nature", was made for the 2001 Cow Parade before it was moved to the outdoor classroom.

In 1985 Margaret Blackstone, a teacher at Travis, applied for and received a grant from the National Gardening Association; the grant was issued to develop an urban garden program for Travis Elementary. As of 2006 each classroom has a dedicated plot in the school's garden.

== Feeder patterns ==
Different sections of the Travis attendance zone are assigned to different middle and high schools. Most of the zone, west of Interstate 45, is zoned to Hogg Middle School and Heights High School (formerly Reagan High School). The portion east of I-45 is zoned to Marshall Middle School and Northside High School (formerly Jeff Davis High School).

== Notable alumni ==
- William Goyen (novelist)

== Note ==
- Some material originates from Woodland Heights, Houston
