= Samuel A. Countee =

American artist (1909–1959)

Samuel Albert Countee (April 1, 1909 – September 11, 1959) was an American painter and sculptor. Countee's artwork depicted African-American life. The SSG Samuel A. Countee Hall at Fort Leonard Wood is named in his honor.

== Early life and education ==
Countee was born April 1, 1909, in Marshall, Texas to Thomas Countee and Nannie Salina Yates Countee. He attended Booker T. Washington High School in Houston from 1924 to 1928. Countee graduated in 1934 with a B.A. degree in art from Bishop College. While in college, he painted portraits of faculty and administrators to raise money for tuition.

After Countee graduated from college in 1934, he received a scholarship to the School of the Museum of Fine Arts, Boston (now School of the Museum of Fine Arts at Tufts) where he served as an artist-in-residence.

== Career ==
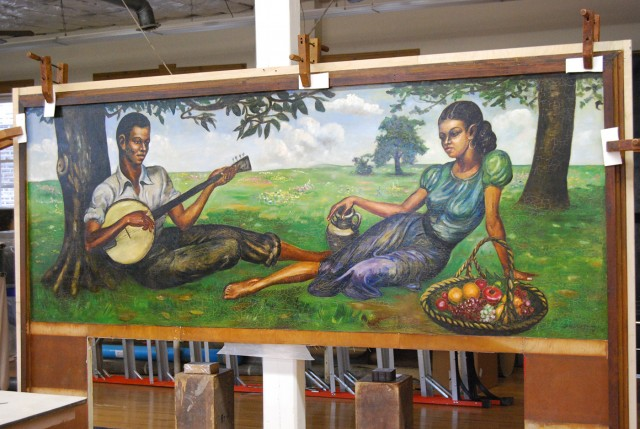
Samuel Countee mural during restoration process. The mural was reinstalled as Fort Leonard Wood's Countee Hall in 2017

From 1933 to 1935, Countee exhibited his art in a number of shows. In 1933, his piece, Little Brown Boy, was exhibited by the William E. Harmon Foundation. He also exhibited at Howard University, Atlanta University, Smith College, Institute of Modern Art in Boston, and the 1936 Texas Centennial's Hall of Negro Life.

Countee was drafted into the United States Army in 1942 where he served in the 436th Engineer General Service Dump Truck Company. While in the Army, he was commissioned to create a mural for the African-American Officers’ Club at Fort Leonard Wood in Missouri. He also painted sets for USO shows.

Countee moved to New York after being discharged from the military as a staff sergeant. He became known among New York artists and went on to paint portraits of Lucille Armstrong, Harry Belafonte, and Marian Anderson.

Countee taught art in the New York City Public Schools, working at a special school for narcotics addicts in the Bronx. He was also a private art instructor.

== Personal life ==
Countee settled in Long Island, New York. He married Mary Miner in 1955.

Countee died of cancer on September 11, 1959 at Meadowbrook Hospital in East Meadow, Nassau County. Prior to his death, he was living in Hempstead, New York. Countee was interred at Long Island National Cemetery.

== Legacy ==
In 2019, the Fort Leonard Wood African-American Officers’ Club that houses Countee's mural was renamed SSG Samuel A. Countee Hall.

Countee's niece, Sammie Witing-Ellis, helped to attribute the mural to her uncle after finding matching work in his sketchbook.
