= Waltrip High School =

S.P. Waltrip High School

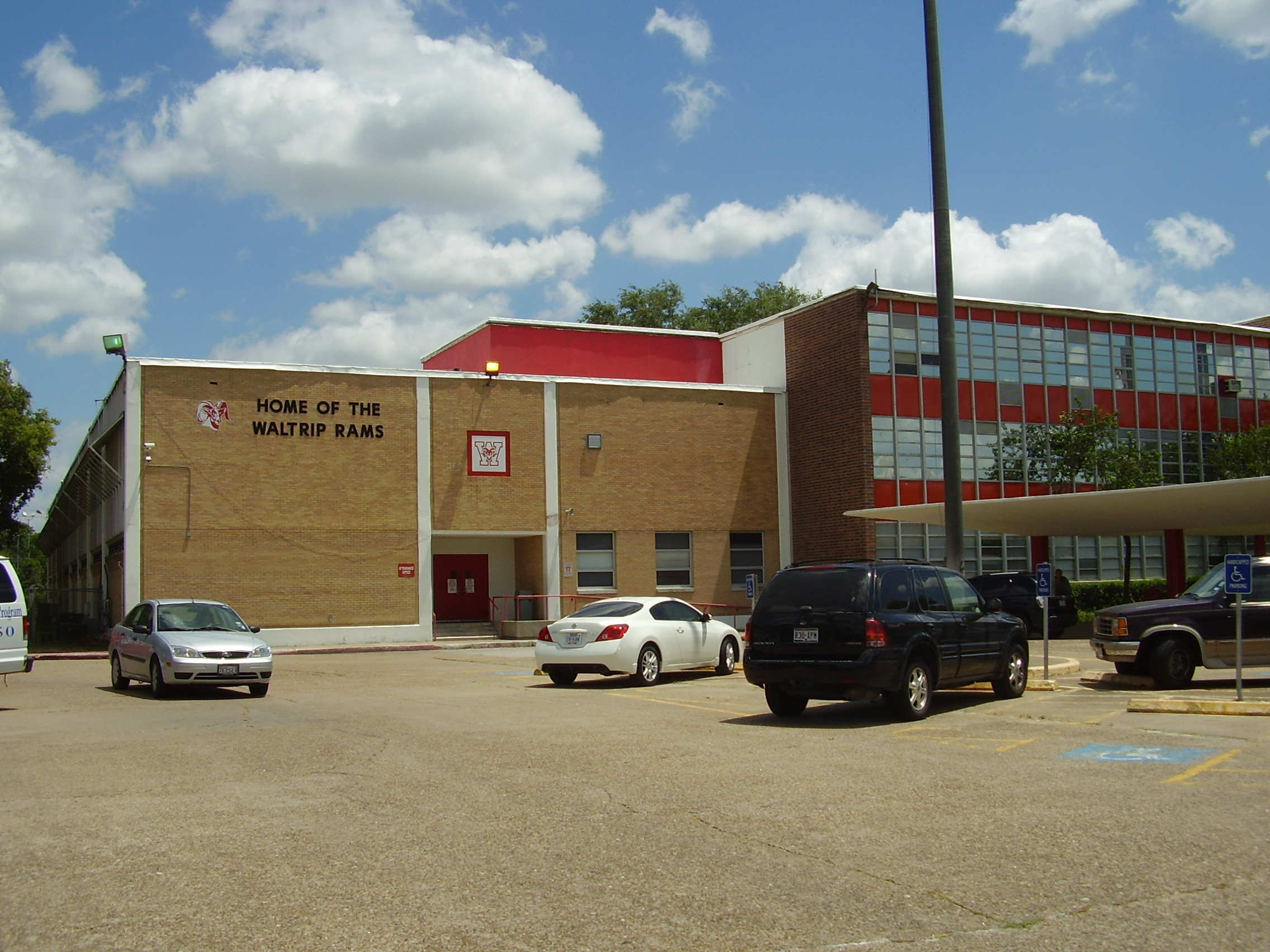
- Waltrip High School in 2009

Location
- Houston, Texas; United States; 29.819442°N 95.434284°W

Information
- Type: Public high school
- Established: 1959; 67 years ago
- School district: Houston Independent School District
- Principal: Margaret Randall
- Staff: 105.83 (FTE) (2022–23)
- Grades: 9–12
- Enrollment: 1,597 (2022–23)
- Student to teacher ratio: 15.09:1 (2022–23)
- Colors: Red and gray
- Mascot: Rams
- Newspaper: The Waltrip Tribune
- Yearbook: Aries
- Website: waltrip.houstonisd.org

Stephen Pool Waltrip High School is a public high school located at 1900 West 34th Street in Houston, Texas, United States. It serves grades 9 through 12 and is a part of the Houston Independent School District.

The school's namesake is a former principal at the defunct Houston Heights High School, who transferred to Reagan High School (now renamed Heights High School) after that school replaced the original Houston Heights High.

== History ==
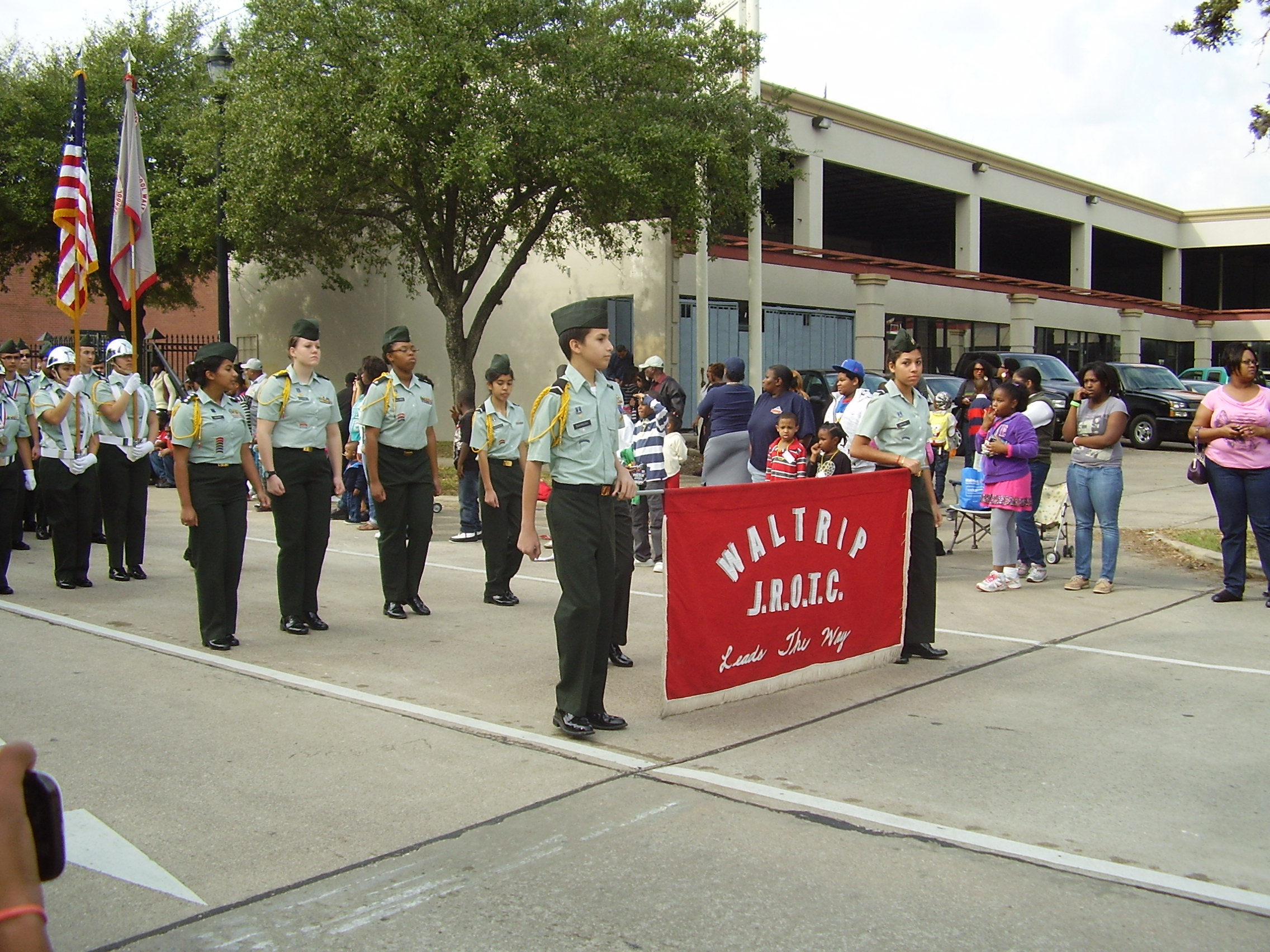
Waltrip JROTC, 2013 Martin Luther King Day Parade in Midtown Houston

Waltrip High School opened in 1960 to serve many newly developed post-World War II subdivisions, and relieved Reagan High School of many students when it did so. It was relieved by Scarborough Junior-Senior High School when that school opened in 1969. The school was named after Stephen Pool Waltrip, a funeral home owner in the Houston Heights named principal of Reagan High School in 1918.

The school remained majority white until the early 1990s, when the school was equally white, black, and Hispanic.

In 1997 a portion of the Reagan High School boundary was rezoned to Waltrip. By the 2000s, Waltrip became majority Hispanic.

Waltrip has become one of the highest performing comprehensive high schools in Houston ISD by being named "Recognized" by the Texas Education Agency, one of the few urban high schools in Houston ISD to receive such a designation. (Reference: Texas Education Agency website).

Around 2012, each year a total of 400 students transfer from Booker T. Washington High School to Waltrip and Reagan.

In 2015 Andria Schur got a job as the principal of a charter school in Dallas, Texas, causing her to leave her post as principal of Waltrip. Dale Mitchell, previously the principal of Sterling High School, became the principal of Waltrip.

The campus began receiving a renovation around 2015.

== Student body ==
The makeup of the 1,597 students enrolled during the 2022-2023 school year was:

- 77% Hispanic
- 8% White
- 14% Black
- <1% Asian
- <1% Native American

Approximately 74% of the students qualified for free or reduced lunch programs.

== Facilities ==
In 2012 it housed the Waltrip High School Child Development Center, a preschool program for low income children. Since 2015 it no longer does so.

== Academic performance ==
The Texas Education Agency rankings in 2009-2010 and 2011 were "Recognized" and "Academically Acceptable". Downing stated in 2012 that "Waltrip High is neither the worst nor the best high school in HISD."

== Notable alumni ==
- Mark Calaway (Class of 1983) - Retired WWE professional wrestler known as The Undertaker.
- David Owen Brooks - convicted murderer and accomplice of serial killer Dean Corll
- Shelley Duvall (Class of 1967) - Producer and actress
- Denzel Livingston (Class of 2011), basketball player for Hapoel Kfar Saba of the Israeli Liga Leumit
- Debra Maffett (Class of 1975) - Miss America 1983.
- Van Malone (Class of 1988) - Professional American football player for the Detroit Lions and college football coach
- Keenan McCardell (Class of 1988) - Professional American football wide receiver coach for the Minnesota Vikings
- Barbara Olson (Class of 1974) - Conservative commentator and September 11, 2001 attacks victim
- Patrick Swayze (Class of 1971) - Actor and dancer.
- Ric Gonzalez (Class of 1992) - Distribution Savant and Entrepreneur.
- Jermaine Rogers (Class of 1991) - Gig-poster artist and vinyl collectible designer.
- John H. Whitmire (Class of 1967) - A Texas senator, Mayor of Houston
- Elizabeth Pena and Jennifer Ertman - murder victims - Waltrip High School contains a memorial to the girls
