= Magnolia Grove, Houston =

Neighborhood in Houston, Texas

Magnolia Grove is a small neighborhood located along Buffalo Bayou between downtown Houston and the Memorial Park in Houston, Texas. The neighborhood is bounded by Memorial Drive, Shepherd Drive, Washington Avenue, and Waugh Drive.

== Education ==
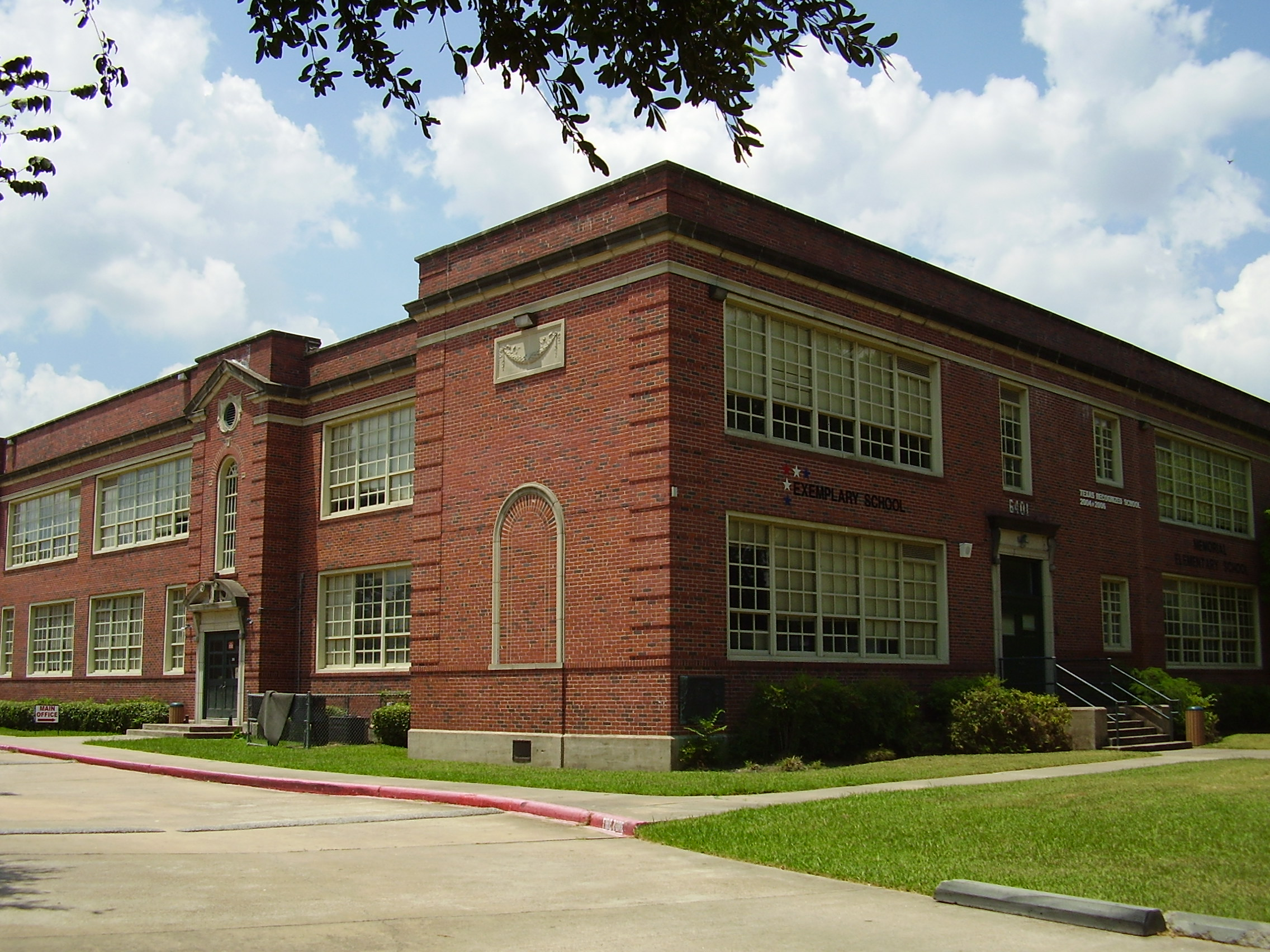
Memorial Elementary School

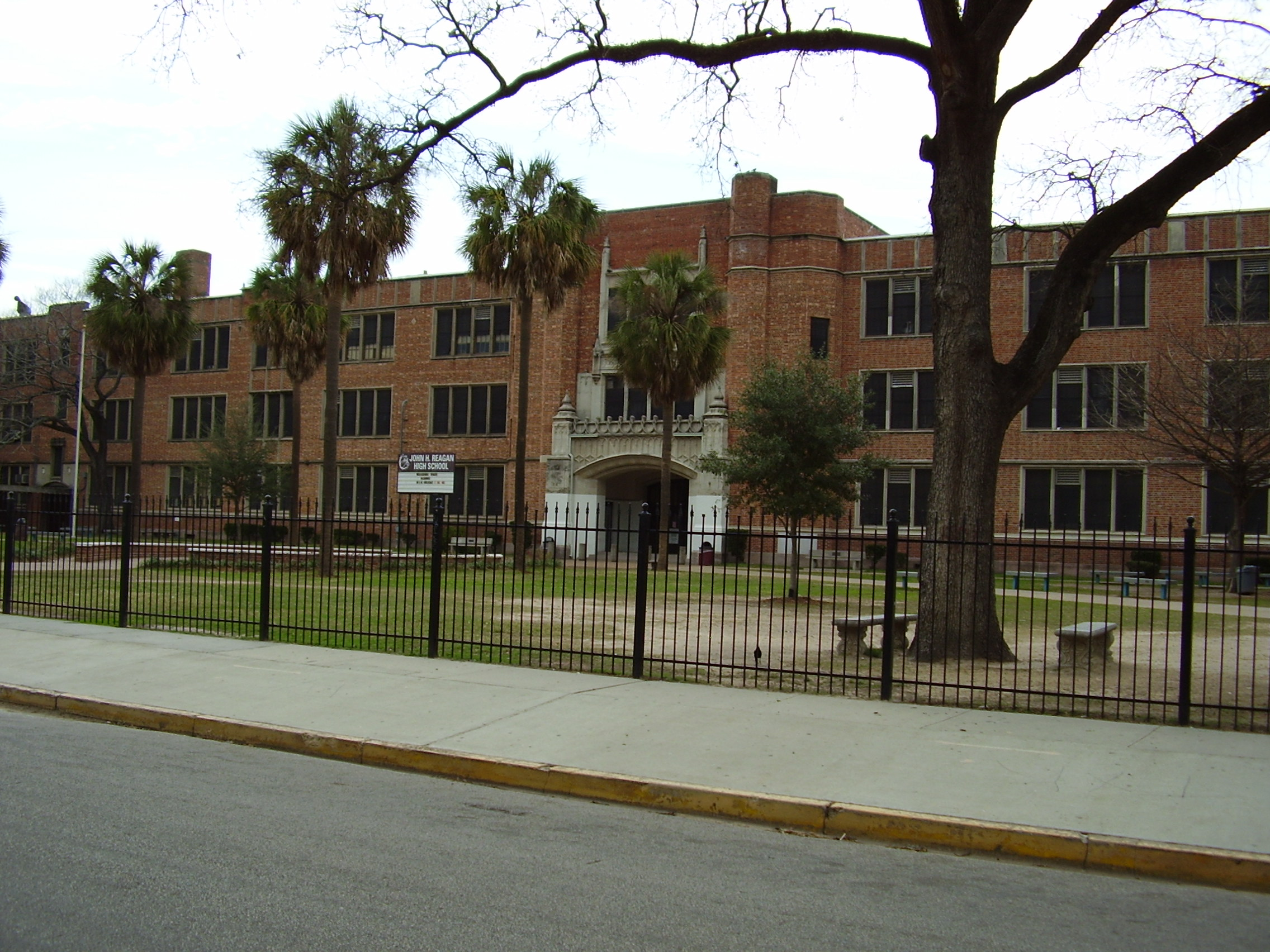
Reagan High School

Residents are zoned to Houston ISD schools. Residents are zoned to Memorial Elementary School, Hogg Middle School, and Reagan High School.
