= Heights High School =

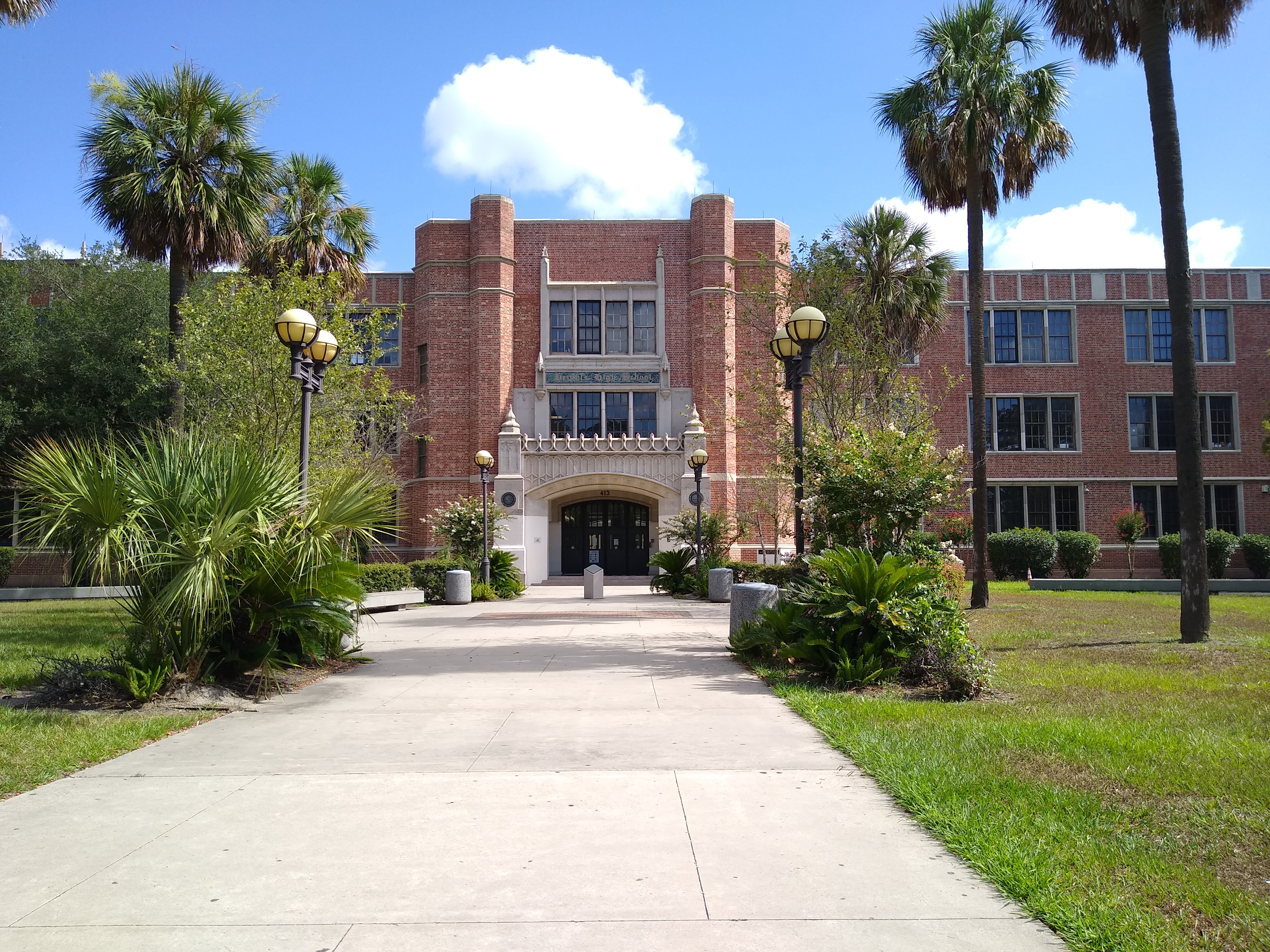

Location
- 413 East 13th St. Houston, TX 77008; Houston, Texas, United States; 29°47′42″N 95°23′36″W

Information
- Type: Public school (U.S.)
- Founded: 1926
- Principal Administrator: lan Olmstead
- Staff: 128.61 (FTE)
- Enrollment: 2,521 (2023-2024)
- Student to teacher ratio: 19.60
- Campus: Urban
- Colors: Maroon, white and gray
- Mascot: Bulldog
- Feeder schools: Gregory-Lincoln Education Center (K-8); Harvard Elementary School; Travis Elementary School; Others listed below
- Website: heights.houstonisd.org

Heights High School, formerly John H. Reagan High School, is a senior high school located in the Houston Heights in Houston, Texas. It serves students in grades nine through twelve and is a part of the Houston Independent School District.

Heights High School is HISD's Magnet School of Computer Technology and offers the International Baccalaureate Programme (IB) Middle Years Program (till 10th grade) and twenty Advanced Placement (AP) courses. Students join one of the following academies: Computer Magnet Academy, Health Science Academy, Business Academy, Engineering Academy, or Transportation Academy. The principal of Heights High School is Ian Olmstead.

== History ==
Houston Heights High School was first established for Heights residents in 1904, as an elementary through high school. Its initial site was lots 8-17 of Houston Heights Block 185, on what is now Milroy Park.

When the Heights joined the City of Houston in 1918, the building at the end of Heights Boulevard and 20th known today as Hamilton Middle School became the Senior High School, and the old location became a Junior High School. When the original building on Yale and 12th burned in 1924, a new location for the high school was picked in the block between Oxford and Arlington, 13th and 14th. The new school was named John H. Reagan High School and opened in 1926 with the student body and teachers marching down Heights Blvd from the old school building to the new high school on 13th Street. Reagan was built on the entirety of blocks 166 and 167.

The campus was designed by John Staub and William Ward Watkin, who were designers of the original campus of Rice University. Reagan was first established as an all-white high school.

Overcrowding at Reagan was relieved by Waltrip High School when Waltrip opened in 1959.

Reagan High was previously reserved for white children (Hispanics being categorized as white prior to 1970) but it desegregated by 1970. Its student body started to become increasingly Hispanic; by 1988 Reagan was mostly Hispanic. In 1997 a portion of the Reagan boundary was rezoned to Waltrip.

In 2006 Reagan began a renovation project. Set to end in the summer of 2007, the renovations to Reagan included the building of a new cafeteria, a new gymnasium complex, an additional academic building, a new vocational building, and a library.

Circa 2006 Connie Berger became the principal of Reagan. In 2009 Berger expected around 100 former private school students to enroll because the economic conditions persuaded families to send their children to public school instead of private school.

Around 2012, each year a total of 400 students transfer from Booker T. Washington High School to Reagan and Waltrip High School.

The HISD board voted to rename the school to Heights High School in 2016. In June 2016 a group of eight Houston area residents, including alumni and parents, sued HISD to get an injunction to prevent the name changes; they did so after HISD did not accept their ultimatum to stop the name changes. Wayne Dolcefino serves as their spokesperson. The case was rejected in court.

== Campus ==
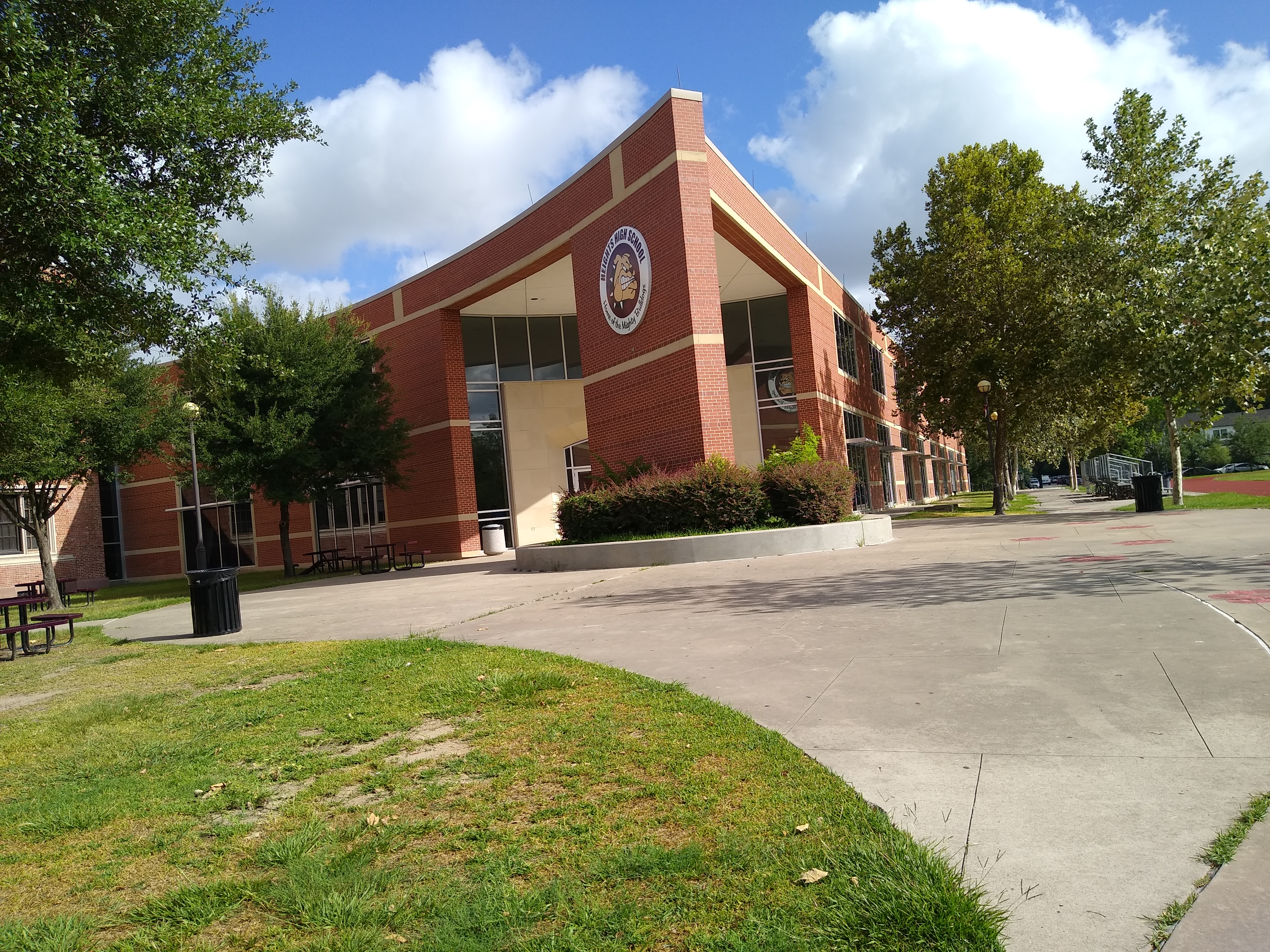
Entranceway of the campus

In 2006 Reagan began a renovation project that included the building of a new cafeteria, a new gymnasium complex, an additional academic building, a new vocational building, and a library. The school now also has an auditorium, a teaching theater, dance rooms, technology rooms, a piano lab, a choir/band hall, and a library with computers where the students can do research. It also has a two-story parking garage, an auto shop, and large track and field.

In 2012 Richard Connelly of the Houston Press ranked Reagan as the sixth most architecturally beautiful high school campus in Greater Houston. Connelly said that a coworker told him that Reagan looked like Rydell High School in Grease.

== Career Pathways ==
Health and Science Pathway: classes and shadowing at health care facilities; seniors can work entry level health positions in partnership with Ben Taub Hospital. Business Pathway: classes and hands-on experience. Magnet Pathway for Computer Pathway: options include audio/video production, computer programming and digital media/web technology. The school’s A/V program is the only authorized Apple training center in the Houston area, giving students the opportunity to earn certification in Apple Final Cut Pro video editing software. Engineering and Design Pathway– Students participate in VEX and FIRST Robotics, and have access to a NAO Humanoid Robot for programming, Markerbots 3D printers and an Arduino electronics lab. Transportation Pathway – Students study in specialized labs designed for automotive mechanics and repair. The program is certified by NATEF and students compete in SkillsUSA competitions. International Baccalaureate – (IB) – In 2013, Reagan became an official IB World School offering the Middle Years Programme (from 6th to 10th grade) in partnership with Hogg Middle School.

== Student body ==
In 2006 the school had 1,600 students. In 2016 it had 2,340 students.

For the 2022-23 school year, the demographics of the school consisted of:

- African American: 10.8%
- Hispanic: 73.5%
- White: 12.0%
- American Indian: 0.1%
- Asian: 1.7%
- Pacific Islander: 0.1%
- Two or More Races: 1.7%
- Economically Disadvantaged: 64.9%

== Athletics ==
2014 was Heights High’s first year in the 6A Conference. The football team is cheered on by Bulldog Cheerleaders, the “redcoats”, and a marching band composed of about 140 students.

== Neighborhoods served by the school ==
Heights High School takes students from most of the Houston Heights neighborhood, a small portion of Downtown Houston, the Fourth Ward, East Norhill, Woodland Heights, Brooke Smith, Magnolia Grove, Stude the Old Sixth Ward, The Historic 1st Ward, and a small portion of Midtown. Other parts of Houston northwest of downtown within the 610 Loop are zoned to Heights High as well. Originally, all of the Houston Heights was zoned to the school. In 1997, a small portion was rezoned to Waltrip.

The following Houston Housing Authority public housing complexes, all in the Fourth Ward, are zoned to Heights High: Historic Oaks of Allen Parkway Village, Historical Rental Initiative (30 single-family houses), and Victory Place.

== Feeder patterns ==
Middle schools feeding into Heights High School include Gregory-Lincoln Education Center, Alexander Hamilton, and Hogg,

Elementary schools that feed indirectly into Heights through the above middle schools include Browning Field Harvard (partial) Crockett Gregory-Lincoln Education Center Helms Jefferson Ketelsen (partial) Love Memorial (partial), and Travis (partial).

Magnet students must follow the HISD Magnet application process and may apply from all HISD areas.

== Notable alumni ==
- Red Adair (Class of 1931), oil well firefighter
- Mary Kay Ash (Class of 1934), founder of Mary Kay Cosmetics
- Val Belcher (Class of 1972), former CFL All-Star
- Dr. Denton Cooley (Class of 1937), heart surgeon
- Wayne Graham (Class of 1954), professional baseball player Philadelphia Phillies, and New York Mets. Head Baseball Coach of the Rice University Owls
- Richard Haynes (lawyer) (Class of 1945), criminal defense attorney
- Larry Hovis (Class of 1954), actor, notably in long running TV sitcom, "Hogans' Heroes"
- Raymond Knight (Class of 1940), U.S. Army Air Corps Medal of Honor recipient
- Dan Rather (Class of 1950), journalist
- Craig Reynolds (Class of 1971), professional baseball player for the Pittsburgh Pirates, Seattle Mariners, and Houston Astros
- Martha Wong (Class of 1957), former Texas state representative
- Gwendolyn Zepeda (Class of 1990), author
