= Wards of Houston =

Divisions of the city of Houston, Texas, US

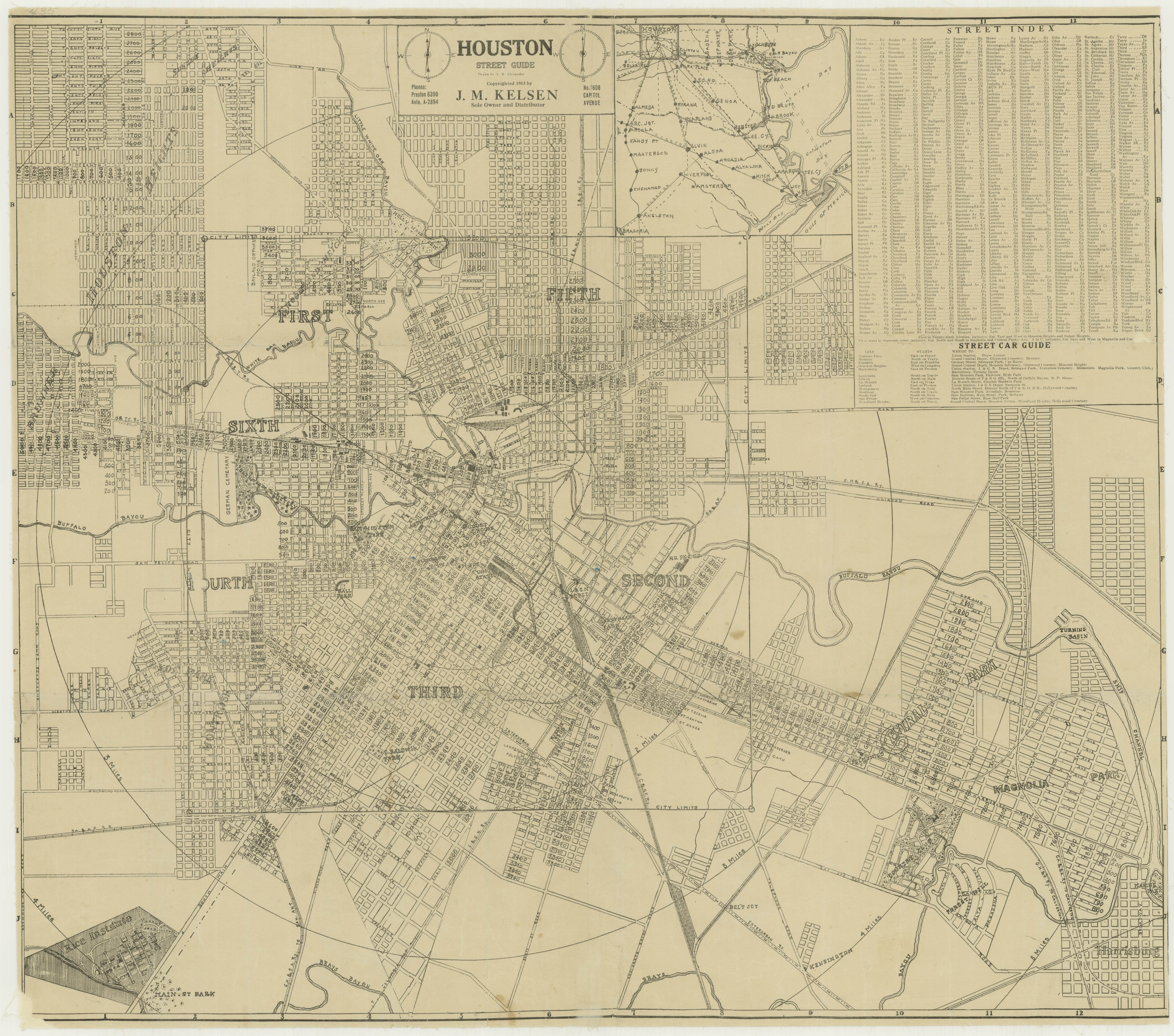
1913 map of the six wards of Houston

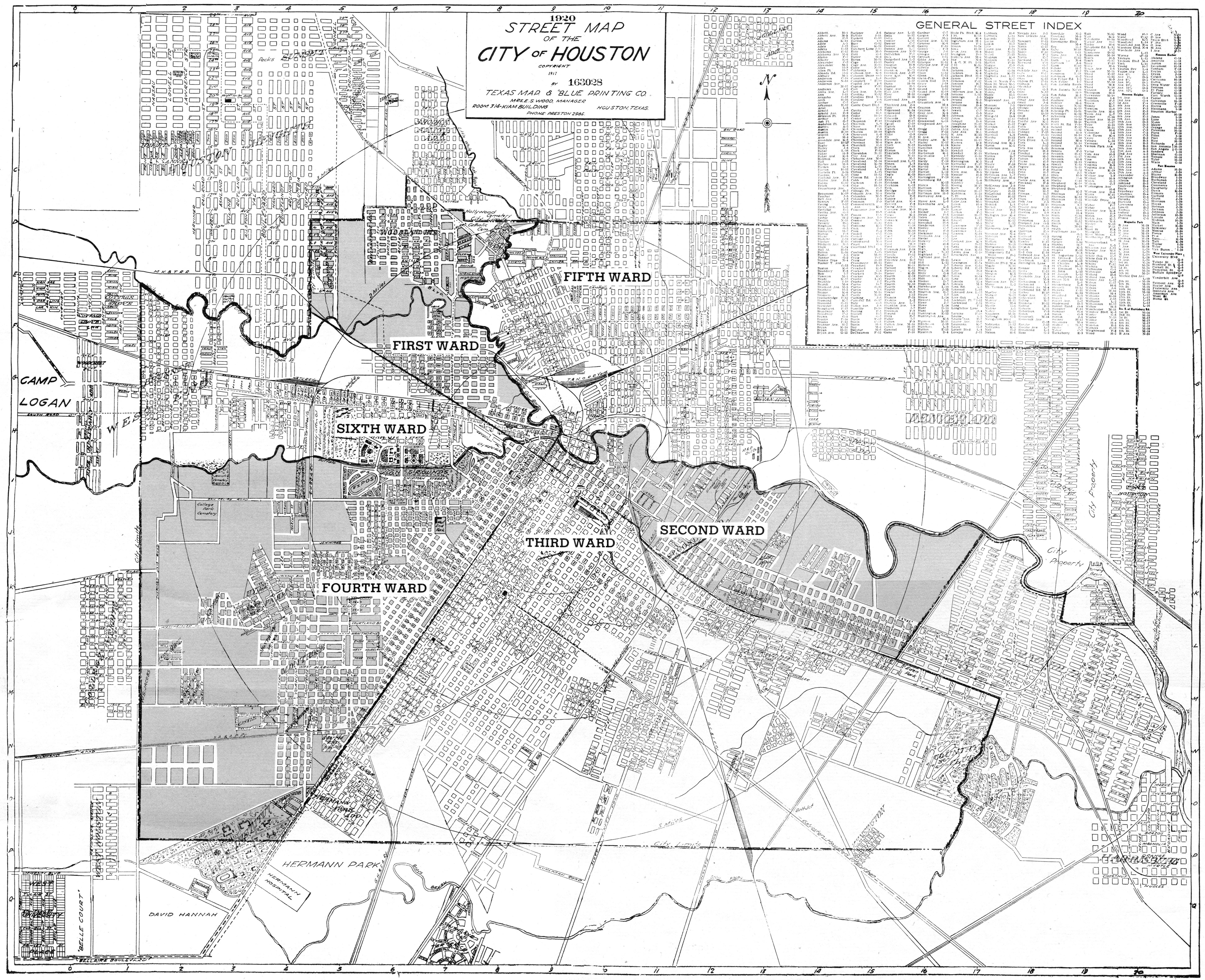
1920 map of the six wards of Houston

After the city of Houston was founded in 1836 by John Kirby Allen and Augustus Chapman Allen and incorporated in 1837 as part of the Republic of Texas, it was organized into ordinally numbered wards. The ward system was a common political tool of the early 19th century, and is still used in some American cities. When the system was at its peak, the city had six wards. Today, the much larger city is divided for governmental purposes into eleven lettered City Council Districts. The city also divides resources via 88 Super Neighborhoods, four of which bear the names of their predecessors.

== Wards as political divisions ==
=== First four wards ===
In 1840, the Republic of Texas altered the city charter for Houston, dividing it into four wards. Historically the wards reflected geographic boundaries, without consideration of the population density within the wards.

Houston's municipal charter of 1840 recognized a square area of 9 square miles, which was divided into four wards. Though the surveyors chose the Harris County Courthouse as the geographical center of Houston, the ward boundaries were formed by two axes converging at the corner of Main and Congress Streets. These resulted in four pie-shaped wards, almost identical in size, numbering clockwise from the northwest quadrant. Voters from each ward elected two aldermen, who served the public without pay. Candidates for alderman were limited to white, male, Texas-citizens, and furthermore, were subject to requirements to have nominal tenure of residency and real estate holdings in the city.

After slavery ended in Texas in June 1865, ex-slaves were forced to live in separate enclaves within each of Houston's wards. The voting population of the wards was lower than the population, since women and African-Americans had been forbidden from voting. Instead, wards followed boundaries of features such as the Buffalo Bayou, Congress Street, and Main Street. Each ward elected two aldermen to the Houston City Council. The election of the Mayor of Houston was citywide. Betty Chapman, a historian, said "They really were mixed societies in the early days. Where you worked dictated where you lived, not who you wanted to live around."

The ward boundaries touched each other at the intersection of Congress Street and Main Street. The first ward was northwest of that intersection. The ward housed the city's market house and produce industry facilities. The second ward was located to the northeast. The courthouse and the heavy warehouses were located there. Therefore, many lawyers and merchants resided there. The third was situated to the southeast. Businesspeople, craftsmen, and professionals lived there. The Third Ward had fancier houses than other wards. The fourth ward was southwest of the intersection. That ward included what was then the central portion of the city. Freed slaves developed Freedmen's Town in a 5 square miles (13 km^{2}) area in the Fourth Ward.

What was once Produce Row, a group of produce businesses on Commerce Street in the urbanized section of First Ward, is now in Downtown Houston. What was then rural First Ward had many farms, so the process of food production occurred in the First Ward. In 2018 the street artist Dual made a mural representing Produce Row on the Main & Co. Building in Downtown.

=== Fifth Ward ===
By December 1866, the Fifth Ward had been created, with two aldermen elected from that area during that month. The Fifth Ward was added in 1866 to accommodate the city's growth. Buffalo Bayou served as the ward's southern border, while the White Oak Bayou served as the ward's western border. The idea was not to have an equal number of residents in each but rather to draw lines along natural boundaries: Buffalo Bayou, Main Street, and Congress Street. In 1876 the city created the Sixth Ward. It was bounded by the First Ward's southwest boundary and the Buffalo Bayou.

=== Sixth Ward ===
In 1876, Houston carved out part of the Fourth Ward to create the Sixth Ward. The new political division was bounded by Buffalo Bayou to the south, Washington Avenue to the north, and Glenwood Cemetery from the west to the city limits.

=== Abolition ===
The City of Houston abolished the ward system in the early 1900s. In 1902, at the beginning of O.T. Hold's term as Mayor of Houston, the city's financial records were in poor shape, and independent auditors found that the city's coffers had a shortage of over $54,000 for the period 1899 to 1902. A 1975 Houston Post article said that the corruption that had been discovered led voters to politically neuter the wards via an election on December 10, 1904. The city of Houston changed to a commission form of government. In November 1915, a newly passed city ordinance officially abolished the wards. On city maps, the wards continued to be used as geographic reference points until 1928. After 1928 other landmarks such as Memorial Park and River Oaks appeared in place of the wards as reference points.

== Communities and legacy ==
While the wards no longer exist legally, area residents still identify certain communities, especially that have been a part of the city since incorporation, as being "wards" of the city. The ward identification appears on signage and in casual conversation from Houstonians. Houston's wards as they are referred to today are not identical to the wards that existed before 1915. Will Howard, an assistant manager of the Texas and local history department of the Houston Public Library, said during that year, "They are cultural entities today, not legal entities, and like any culture, they are almost obligated to change."

Large sections of the historic wards have since established their own identities, such as Montrose, Midtown, EaDo, and Woodland Heights. Downtown, the former convergence of the four original wards, is no longer considered part of any ward, and is instead defined by the ring of freeways that separate it from the rest of the city. Other areas, most notably Second, Third, and Fifth Wards, continue to be known primarily by their historical names.
