= Woodland Heights, Houston =

Historic Neighborhood in Houston, Texas

Coordinates: 29.7839°N 95.3828°W

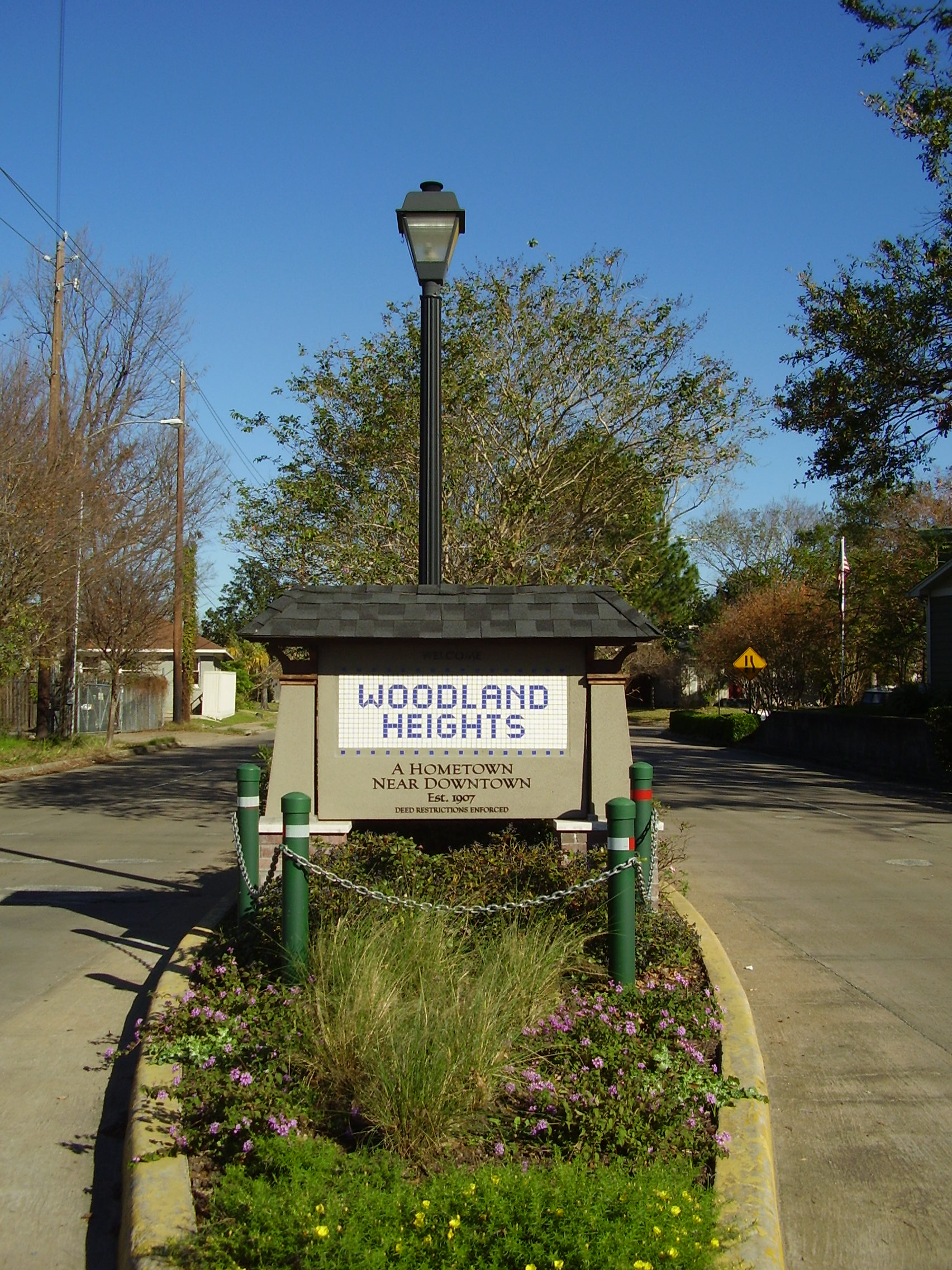
Sign indicating the Woodland Heights

Woodland Heights is a neighborhood and designated historic district in Houston, Texas. It encompasses approximately 2000 homes in the 77009 ZIP code and is bounded on the north by Pecore Street, on the west by Studewood Street, on the east by Interstate 45, and on the south by Interstate 10. It is part of the City of Houston-designated Super Neighborhood 15 (Greater Heights).

== History ==
Woodland Heights was platted by the William A. Wilson Realty Company and opened for lot sales in October 1907 at the northwest corner of Houston. The development occupied 136 acres of what was once Texas settler John Austin's Mexican land grant.

Woodland Heights was a typical streetcar suburb of the era. a twenty-minute commute from Downtown via a streetcar line that traversed Houston Avenue. Woodland Heights, in 1913, was considered part of the First Ward. It was southeast of the older and larger Houston Heights development. It was adjacent to Bayland Park, which was renamed Woodland Park in 1914. Woodland Heights served as the model and sister development to Eastwood, opened by the Wilson Company in 1913 on the opposite end of Houston.

Residents of the new neighborhood founded Beauchamp Springs Presbyterian Church, Woodland Baptist Church, and Zion Lutheran Church. A Masonic lodge was also established. Travis Elementary School (previously Beauchamp Springs Public School) opened on land deeded by the Wilson company.

The neighborhood was one of the earliest in the United States to be linked together via a community email list.

The Woodland Heights development in northwestern Houston in 1913.

On June 29, 2011, Houston’s City Council voted to approve the residents’ historic designation application thereby making a small portion of the original lands a historic district. Woodland Heights Historic District covers about 386 homes and contains a variety of architectural styles including Queen Anne, bungalow, American Craftsman, late Victorian cottages, American Foursquare, and English Cottage.

== Cityscape and architecture ==
Nestled as it is in the crook of two major Interstate highways, it is often overlooked or is assumed to be part of the much larger and somewhat older Houston Heights neighborhood to its west. (Studewood Street is the dividing line between the two neighborhoods.) The architecture of the Woodland Heights is somewhat distinct from that of the Houston Heights. The Houston Heights was platted in 1891, while the Woodland Heights was platted more than 15 years later. During that period, American architecture had undergone a transition from the larger and more ornate Victorian-style homes of the late 19th century to the smaller, simpler and more modest bungalow style of the early 20th century Arts and Crafts era, and the two neighborhoods reflect this shift.

Although the Woodland Heights continues to undergo a gradual gentrification process, the area is still considered a visited tourist destination due to its blend of historical features, mature parks, and popular gardens. Many of the gardens that bring tourists in display forms of sustainable, industry agricultural practices, such as beekeeping, open drainage ditches, and natural landscaping.

The White Oak Bayou watershed is a notable floodplain, where the bayou has overflowed its banks in 1992, 1998 (from Tropical Storm Frances), 2001 due to Tropical Storm Allison, and 2015 due to the Memorial Day Flood.

A rescue boat navigates flooding of White Oak Bayou in Houston, Memorial Day 2015

== Government and infrastructure ==
The Woodland Heights is a part of Houston City Council District H.

The Houston Police Department's Central Patrol Division serves the neighborhood. The area is also patrolled by Harris County Constable Precinct One Deputies.

Harris Health System (formerly Harris County Hospital District) designated Casa de Amigos Health Center in Northside for the ZIP code 77009. The nearest public hospital is Ben Taub General Hospital in the Texas Medical Center.

== Transportation ==
The Katy Freeway and North Freeway direct motorists to and from the area; both converge near the confluence of White Oak Bayou and Little White Oak Bayou.

The main route into the neighborhood, Studewood Street, is a three-lane reversible road, in which the middle lane is dedicated to southbound traffic (toward downtown) during the morning rush hour, and northbound traffic (into the neighborhood) during the evening rush hour. It is one of only a few such streets in Houston.

== Culture and community ==
The neighborhood's civic association sponsors an annual "Lights in the Heights" celebration each December, in which 14 blocks of two parallel streets are lit by luminaria and closed to motor vehicles. The celebration features hot beverages, live music and carriage rides, and attracts visitors from all across the city. The 2006 Lights in the Heights featured an illuminated parade, with several art cars in the lineup.

== Education ==
=== Primary and secondary schools ===
==== Public schools ====
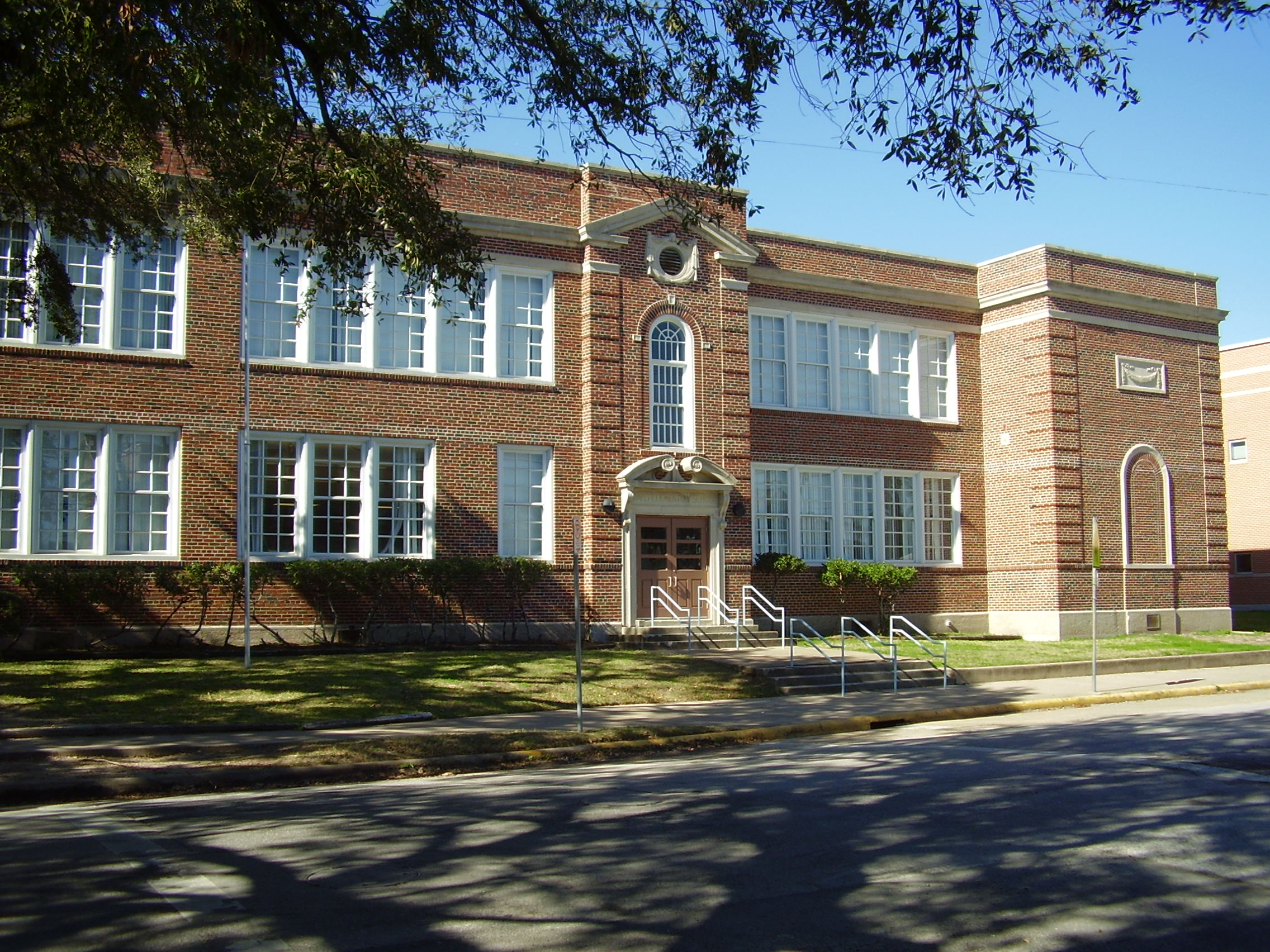
Travis Elementary School

Woodland Heights is served by the Houston Independent School District, and is home to Travis Elementary School, which resides on Block 5. Woodland Heights is also zoned to Hogg Middle School, in adjacent Norhill, and Heights High School (formerly Reagan High School), in the Houston Heights.

Travis Elementary was first built in 1908, with a new campus built in 1926. It received an addition in 1970s, and that was scheduled to be replaced with a new building as part of the 2002 HISD Bond. The renovation of the 1926 section and construction of the new facility was scheduled for completion in 2006.

==== Private schools ====
Houston Outdoor Learning Academy is a private 6-12 school that integrates academics with hands on outdoor learning and international travel and is located at the edge of Woodland Heights.

=== Community colleges ===
Residents are within the zone of the Houston City College.

== Parks and recreation ==
Woodland Park and Community Center, operated by the City of Houston, has an outdoor basketball pavilion, an indoor gymnasium, a lighted sports field, and a lighted tennis court.

Stude Park, which has walking paths, baseball fields, and a public swimming pool along White Oak Bayou, provides views of the Downtown Houston skyline.

== Notable residents ==
- William Goyen (novelist)
- Rosie Walker, publisher of Houston Downtown and a minor candidate for the 1989 election of the Mayor of Houston

== See also ==
- First Ward, Houston
- Eastwood, Houston
