= History of African Americans in Houston =

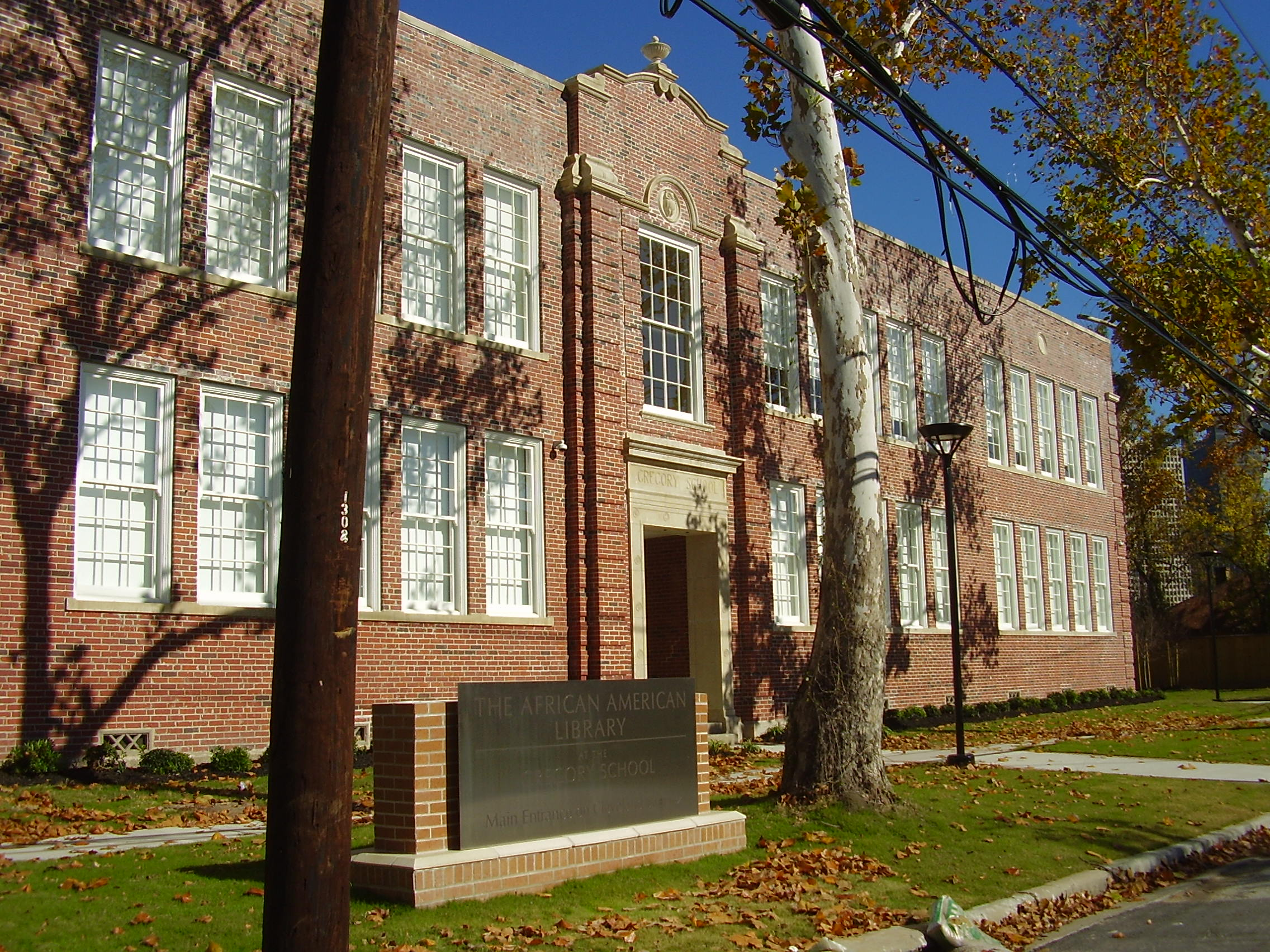
African American Library at the Gregory School, located in the Fourth Ward in Houston

The African American population in Houston, Texas, has been a significant part of the city's community since its establishment. The Greater Houston area has the largest population of African Americans in Texas and west of the Mississippi River. Black Enterprise has referred to Houston as a Black mecca.

== History ==
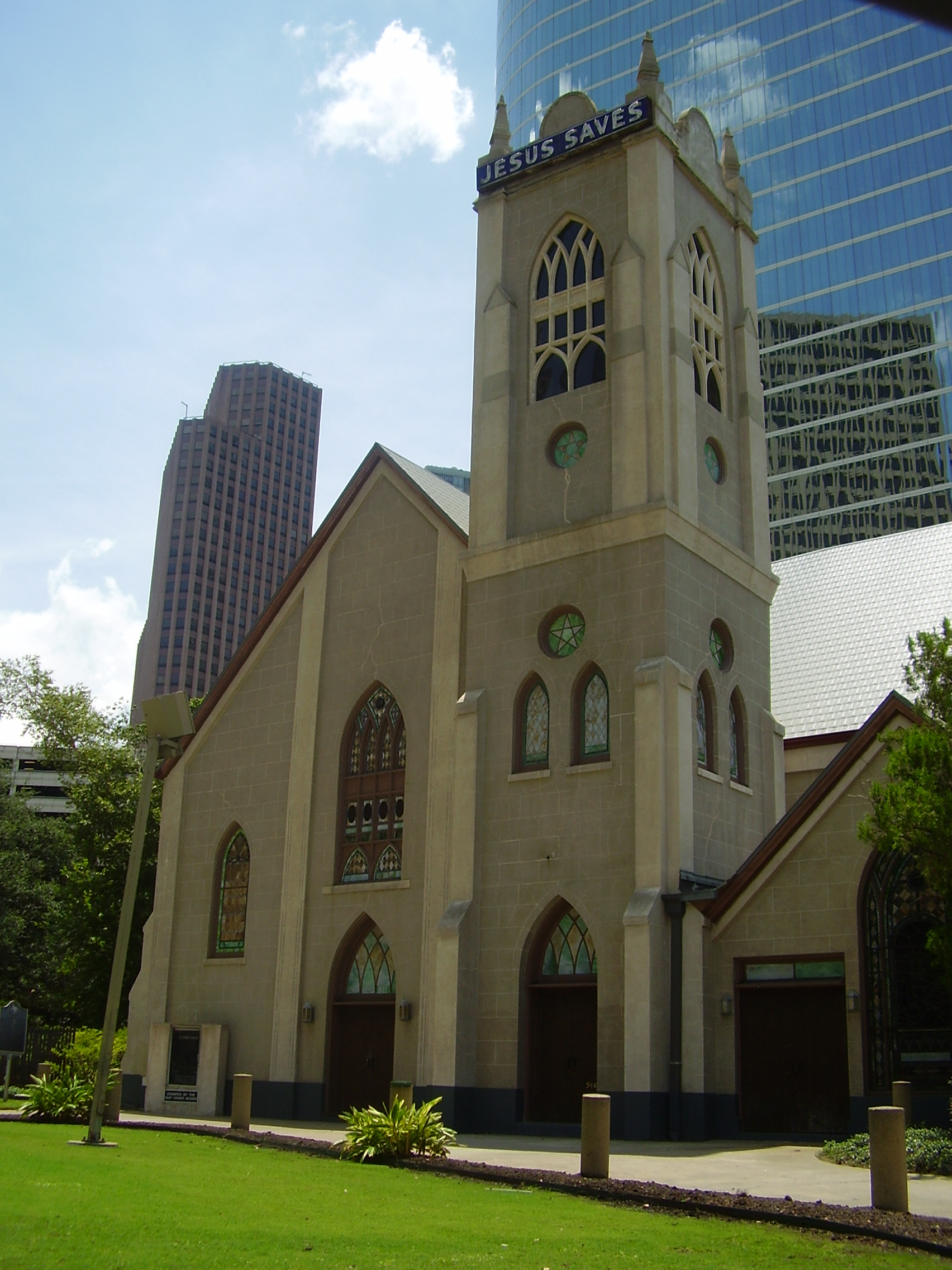
Antioch Missionary Baptist Church

When Houston was founded in 1836, an African-American community had already begun to be established. In 1860, 99% of the city's African American population was enslaved; there were eight free blacks and 1,060 slaves. Before the American Civil War, enslaved African-Americans living near Houston worked on sugar and cotton plantations, while most of those living within the city limits held domestic and artisan jobs.

Although slavery ended after the U.S. Civil War, by the mid-1870s racial segregation became codified throughout the South, including Texas. African Americans in Houston were poorly represented by the predominantly white state legislature and city council, and were politically disenfranchised during the Jim Crow era; whites had used a variety of tactics, including militias and legislation, to re-establish political and social supremacy throughout the South. African Americans have owned land in Houston since Texas’ early colonial period and still is to this present day.

The Red Book of Houston: A Compendium of Social, Professional, Religious, Educational and Industrial Interests of Houston's Colored Population (circa 1915)

In 1929 Houston Planning Commission chairperson Will Hogg made a proposal to designate areas of the city by race in its zoning so African-Americans do not become too numerous near White communities; the city did not enact this as it never adopted zoning.

In the 1940s and 1950s black people from small southern towns moved to Houston, resulting in the black communities increasing in size. The black population in the Third Ward became larger and therefore closer in proximity to nearby Jewish communities. White people began to move from the Third Ward area, partly due to the passage of Brown vs. Board of Education in 1954.

Texas Southern University students led the integration of Houston in the 1960s. On Friday, March 4, 1960, Texas Southern University students led Houston's first sit-in at the Weingarten's grocery store lunch counter located at 4110 Almeda Road. That sit-in played a major role in the desegregation of Houston's white owned businesses. Today, a U.S. Post Office sits at that location; however, a Texas Historical Marker sits in the front of the building reminding visitors of the courageous role TSU students played in the desegregation of Houston, Texas. Six months after their first sit-in, 70 Houston lunch counters were desegregated. The success of their continued efforts eventually led to the full integration of businesses within the city.

In 1970, 90% of the black people in Houston lived in mostly African-American neighborhoods. By 1980 this decreased to 82%.

Historically, the City of Houston placed established landfill facilities in established African American neighborhoods. Private companies also located landfills in black neighborhoods. Between the early 1920s and the late 1970s the five municipal sanitary landfills were in black neighborhoods. During the same period, six of the eight municipal solid waste incinerators resided in mostly black neighborhoods. From 1970 to 1978 three of the four private landfills established during that period were located in Houston black neighborhoods. Around that era African Americans made up around 25% of the city's population. Houston City Council, which decided where the landfills would be located, was entirely composed of white residents until 1972. The political efforts and advocacy behind a 1979 federal lawsuit regarding one proposed landfill led to political changes that ended the deliberate placement of landfills in black neighborhoods.

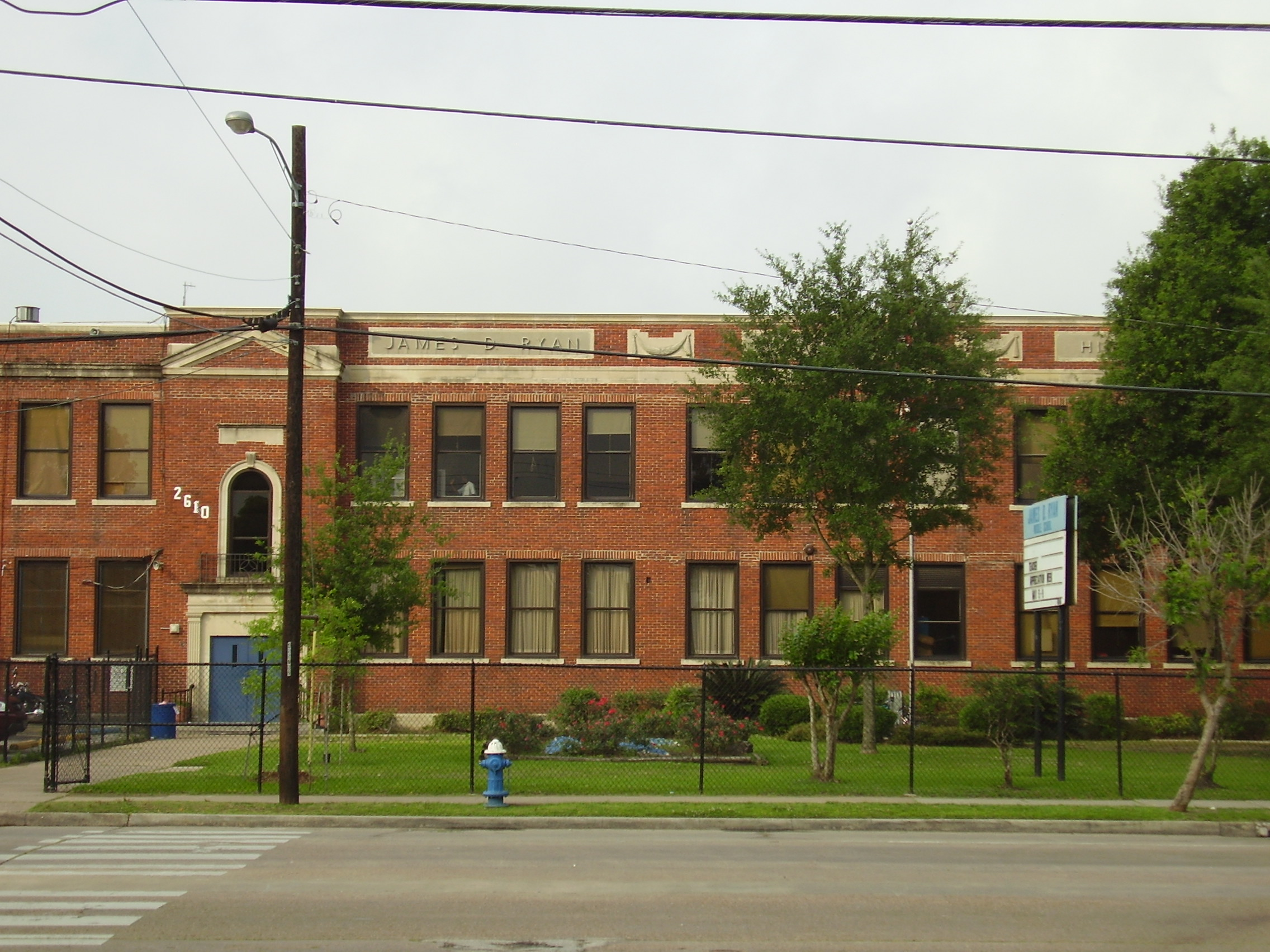
The Baylor College of Medicine Academy at Ryan (formerly Ryan Middle School) exists at the first location of Yates Colored High School

In 1980, the city had 440,257 African American residents, making it one of the largest black populations in the country. As of 1987 most African Americans in Houston continued to live in inner-city black neighborhoods, even though they gained the legal right to move to any neighborhood. According to research at the University of Chicago, many African Americans choose to live in neighborhoods where they were raised.

From the 1980 United States census to the 1990 U.S. census, many African Americans left traditional African-American neighborhoods such as the MacGregor area, Settegast, Sunnyside, and the Third Ward and entered parts of Southwest Houston, such as Alief, Fondren Southwest, Sharpstown, Westchase, and Westwood. Meanwhile, a significant percentage of Houston's Non-Hispanic whites population (particularly those with children under 18) left the city for suburban communities, this phenomenon was known as white flight.

In 2004, some African-Americans who had lived in the suburbs had returned to the inner city area due to their previous ties to those communities.

By 2005 the outflow from traditional black neighborhoods, such as the Third Ward, Sunnyside, Kashmere Gardens, and the Fifth Ward continued, with blacks moving to Alief, other parts of Southwest Houston, Fresno, Missouri City, and northwestern suburbs. Around 2005, African Americans began to move to an area around Farm to Market Road 1960, in an unincorporated area in Harris County. In many traditional inner-city black neighborhoods, Mexican and Latino residents moved in. Houston is one of the fastest-growing large cities in the United States, and a large portion of that growth is due to an influx of Black residents. In addition to the New Great Migration, many African Americans in the US are now recently moving to Houston for lower cost of living and more job opportunities. Houston gained approximately 233,000 African-Americans between 2000 and 2010. Having the largest black population west of the Mississippi River, Houston is known as a center of African-American political power, education, economic prosperity, and culture, often referred to as a black mecca. Houston is ranked among best U.S. metros for Black professionals.

According to LendingTree, there are 3,586 Black-owned businesses out of 108,772 total businesses (3.3%) in Houston, while Black Americans make up 22.4% of Houston's population.

An additional 150,000 to 250,000 mostly black evacuees arrived in 2005 from the New Orleans metro after Hurricane Katrina, with many of them deciding to stay in Houston.

== Commerce ==
The African American community in Houston had a rich diverse economic history. Throughout the communities, many businesses flourished. The Wards, 3rd, 4th and 5th had many restaurants, theaters, clubs, boarding houses, carriage delivery services, millinery shops (hat shops), stationery shops, newspaper publishers, dry goods stores, banks-savings and loans, insurance companies, seamstresses and tailor shops just to name a few. There were two major office buildings that housed many African American businesses, the Pilgrims Building The agricultural history included a host of farmers and ranchers. was home to Sky Ranch the African American airport/air transport service, started by Tuskegee Airmen in the mid-1900s. In the early 1900s the community celebrated DeRoLoc which helped to promote the economic development of the community. This week long event was celebrated by an Agricultural/Industrial Exhibition, Ball, and Carnival. Many of the businesses benefited by all the people that attended from the region. The first Official DeRoLoc Event in Emancipation Park (Oldest park in Texas-donated by Freed Slaves) hosted 4,000 people (Fall 1901-some people say it was 1909), the event stopped in 1929 and was recently revived by a local business (NuWaters Co-op) in Houston. In Acres homes, there was the first African American Bus Company that made many runs to/from downtown Houston, to Acres homes providing transportation to many African Americans.

== Cuisine ==
The Louisiana Creole people who settled Houston around the 1920s brought their cuisine with them. The Creole and Cajun cuisine style spread in Houston in the post-World War II era, which led to various Creole food chains such as Frenchy's Chicken, Pappadeaux, and Popeyes. Creole dishes include boudin, black rice and shrimp creole, crawfish, gumbo, and jambalaya. Bernadette Pruitt, author of The Other Great Migration: The Movement of Rural African Americans to Houston, 1900-1941, wrote that Creole cooking became "an important cultural bridge" in the city and in its African American community, and that, "As cooks, Creole housewives transformed Houston's typical southern cuisine."

In 2021 Alison Cook of the Houston Chronicle wrote that hamburger restaurants in historically black neighborhoods in Houston typically prepare hamburgers "exceptionally charred and well-done".

In 2020, according to Emma Balter of the Houston Chronicle most of the vegan restaurants she chronicled, in a list that was "comprehensive, yet not exhaustive", were owned by African-Americans.

== Demographics ==
From the 1870s to the 1890s, African Americans made up almost 40% of Houston's population. Between 1910 and 1970 the African American population ranged from 21% to 32.7%.

In 1870 36% of the African-Americans in Houston lived in the Fourth Ward, 29% lived in the Third Ward, 16% lived in the Fifth Ward, and 19% lived in other areas. In 1910 the plurality now lived in the Third Ward, with 32%; the Fourth Ward, Fifth Ward, and other areas had 27%, 21%, and 20% respectively.

There were about 34,000 African-Americans in Houston in the 1920s, and in the 1930s there were about 63,000 African-Americans. In 1920, 20% of the people classified as "black" were subclassified as "mulatto"; the census stopped taking statistics on "mulatto" people after 1920. In the racial segregation era people of Louisiana Creole origin with African heritage attended black institutions such as schools even though they often considered themselves racially distinct from non-Creole African Americans. Creoles spoke Louisiana Creole French, making them linguistically distinct. Creoles also had different musical practices as they performed Southwest Louisiana-style "la-la". In the 1920s the "San Felipe districts" had the largest group of African-Americans, the Third and Fifth wards had other significant communities.

In 1940 the African-American population numbered 86,302, 21.4% of the number of people in Houston. The same population increased to 125,400, 21% of the city population, in 1950. 87.9% of the population increase from 1940 to 1950 was due to African-Americans moving from other parts of the United States, mostly Louisiana and Texas; most of the migrating African-Americans from rural areas and small towns. 1960 the African-American population numbered 215,037, 25.7% of the city population. In the central city, from 1950 to 1960, the African-American population increased by 20,299. Their percentage of the total population increased during that period from 23.4% to 31.1% because large numbers of white people left the central city. In 1970 the African-American population numbered 316,922, 25.7% of the city population. By 1980, Houston had 440,257 African American residents, making it one of the largest black populations in the country.

In 2004 55% of the African American population born in Harris County originated from the Houston area either by birth or through growing up there as children.

Between 2010 and 2015, Houston added about 100,000 new black residents to the area. Only behind the Atlanta and Dallas areas.

Many African Americans in the US are now recently moving to Houston due to the city's well-established and influential Black or African American community.

The Houston area has the largest African-American community in Texas and one of the top 10 in the nation.

== Cultural institutions ==
Cultural institutions

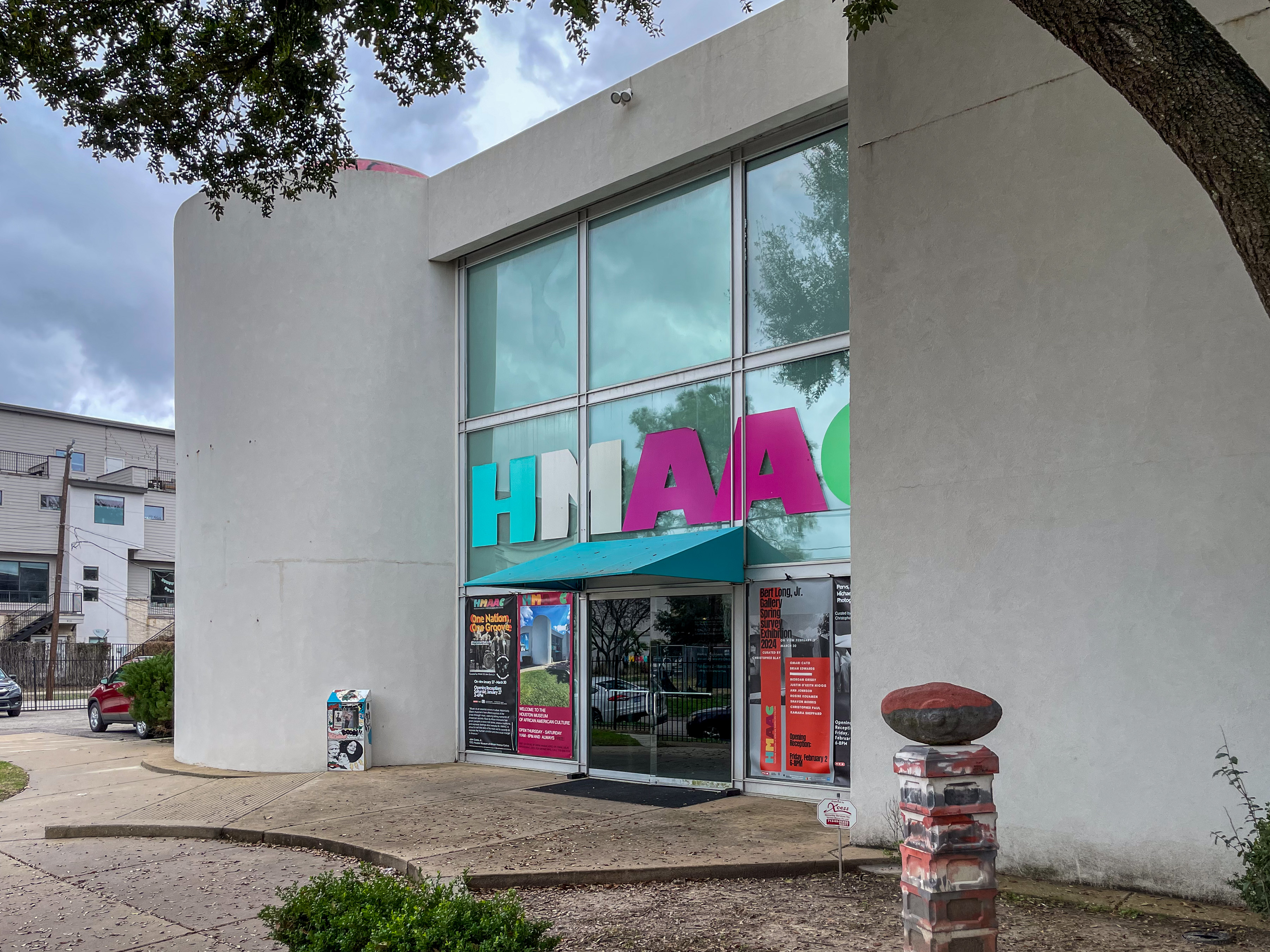
Houston Museum of African American Culture

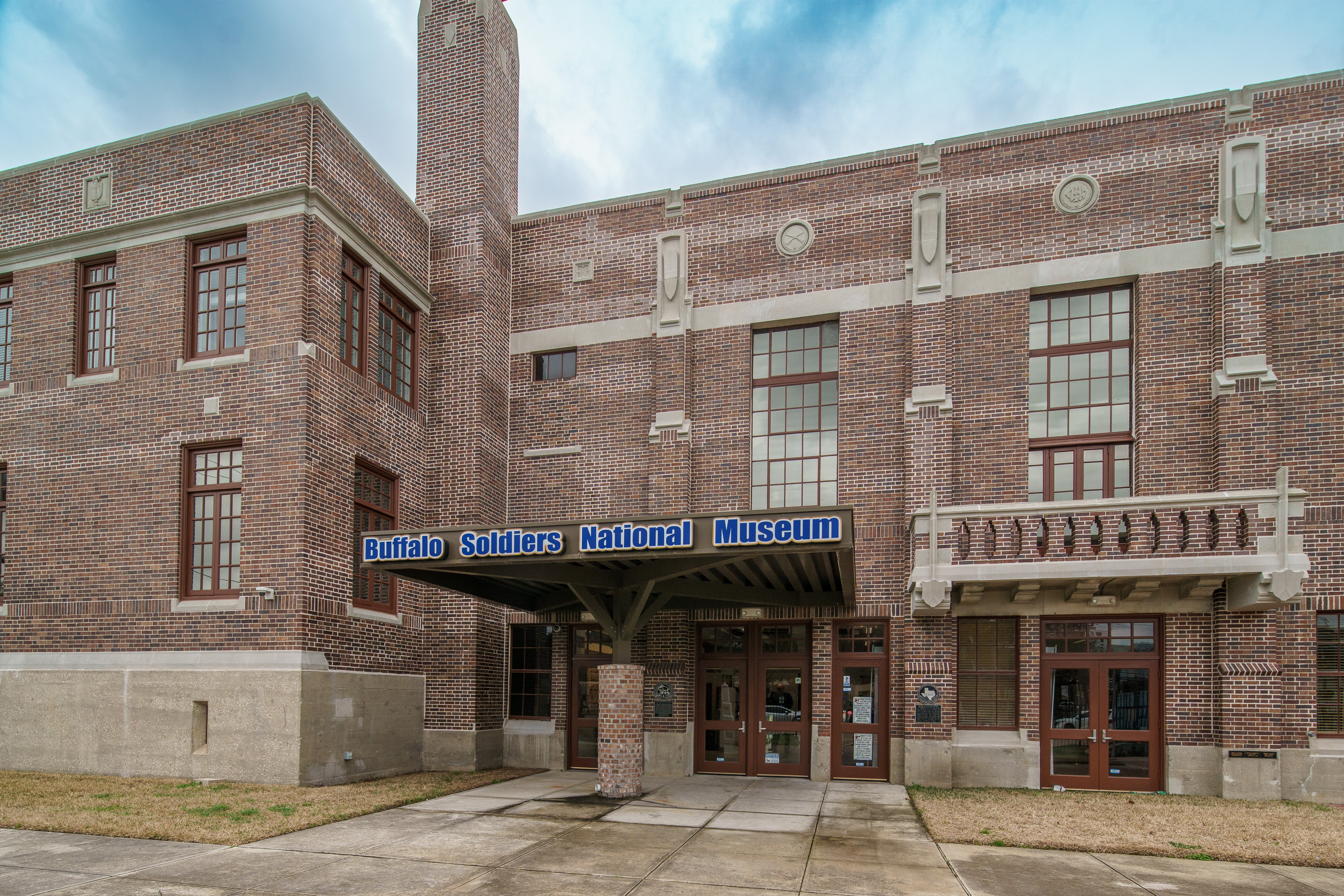
Buffalo Soldiers National Museum

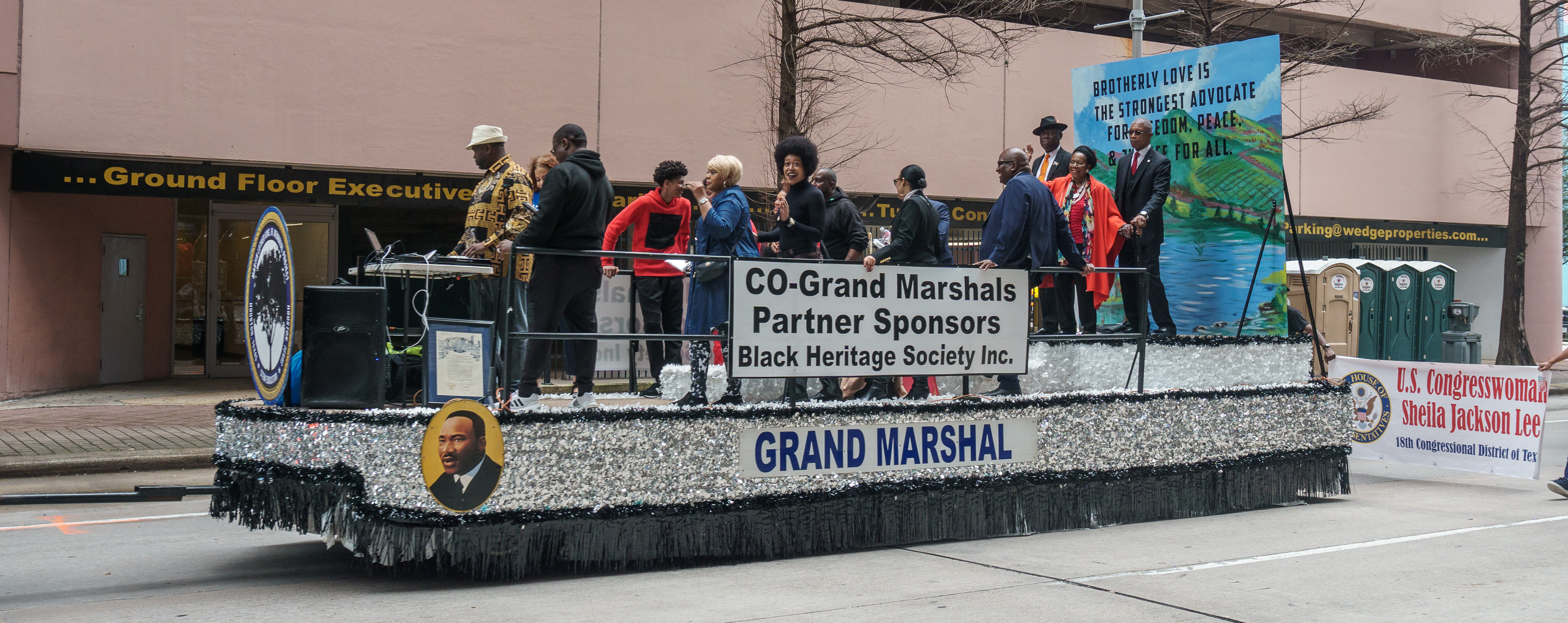
Black Heritage Society
At Houston's 2024 MLK Day Parade

The Houston Museum of African American Culture (HMAAC) and Buffalo Soldiers National Museum located in the Houston Museum District.

The Community Artists' Collective located in the midtown area is a hub for Black creatives and art.

The University Museum located on the campus of Texas Southern University is an art gallery that primarily highlights art by and about people in the African diaspora.

The Rutherford B. H. Yates Museum preserves the legacy of African Americans in Houston's Freedmen's Town.

Shrine of the Black Madonna is a cultural center, museum and bookstore that is owned and operated by the Pan-African Orthodox Christian Church.

In 1974, local activist Ovide Duncantell Jr. (1936–2018) founded Houston's Black Heritage Society. The mission of the society is "to perpetuate the dream, aspiration, and legacy of Dr. Martin Luther King Jr. by fighting for equal rights for all people." The society is mainly known for its sponsorship of Houston's annual "original" MLK Parade since 1978, which claims to be the first MLK Day parade in the country. Duncantell was also instrumental in renaming South Park Boulevard to Martin Luther King, Jr. Boulevard.

The Houston Black Chamber of Commerce serves and supports black businesses and professionals.

== Politics ==
Black Mayors of Houston

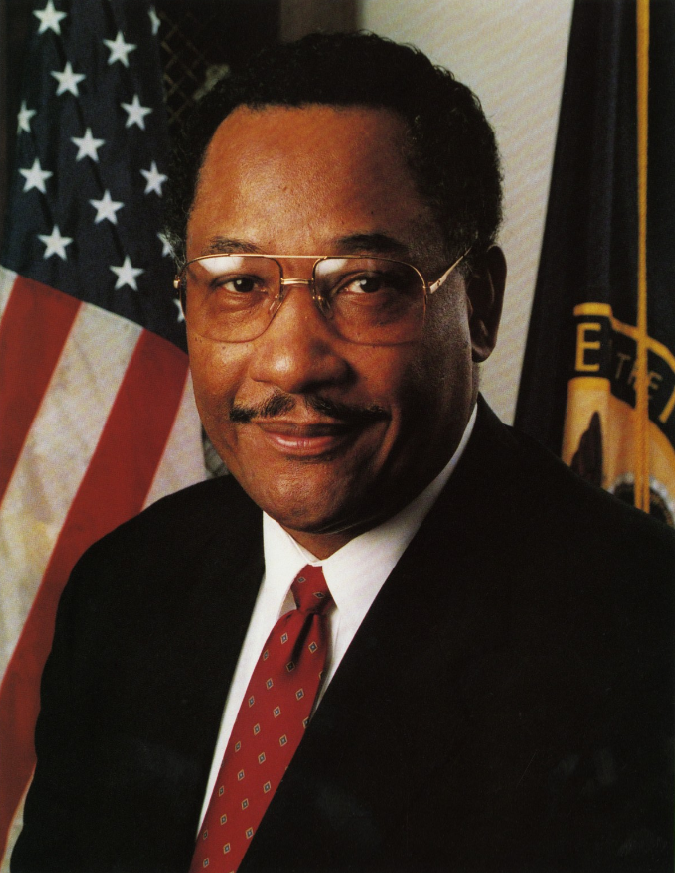
Lee P. Brown, Mayor 1998-2004

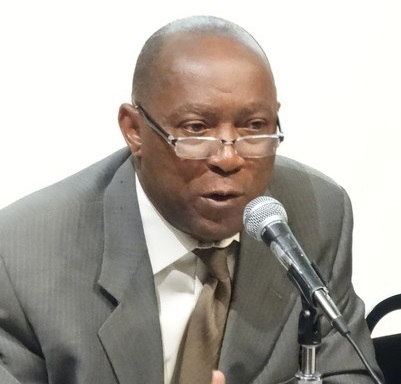
Sylvester Turner, Mayor 2016-2024

Lee P. Brown, elected in 1997, was the first black Mayor of Houston. He was the city's 50th mayor.

As of 1997, African Americans typically constituted less than 25% of the electorate of the City of Houston. For the election of Lee P. Brown, blacks may have made up over 33% of the turnout. Brown won 90% or more in African-American neighborhoods.

As of 2005 Sheila Jackson Lee, a Houstonian, was one of two black Texan U.S. House of Representatives members. Al Green (Texas 9th district), also from Houston, is the other.

On December 13, 2015, Houston elected its second African-American mayor, Sylvester Turner.

== Religion ==
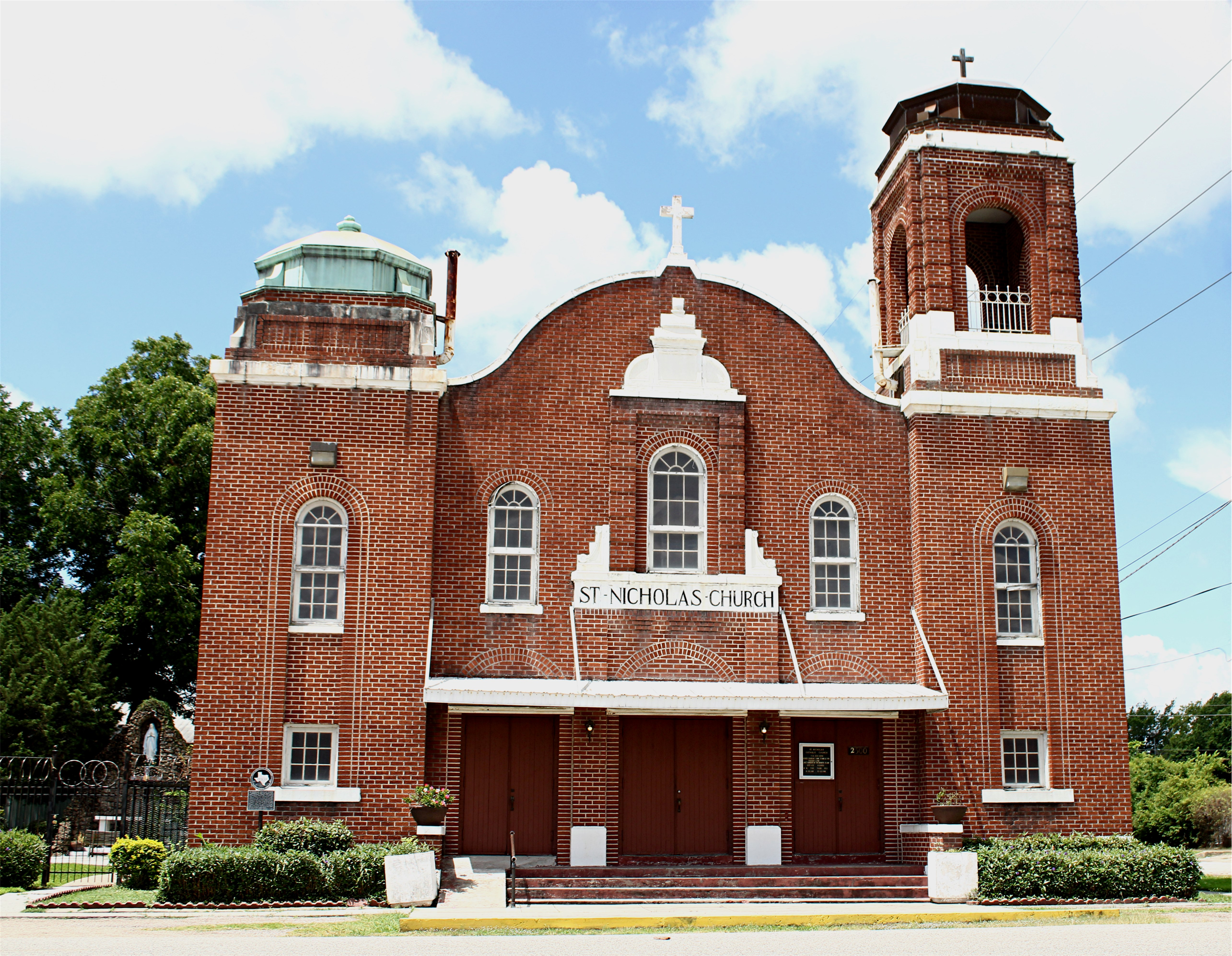
St. Nicholas Catholic Church in East Downtown/Third Ward, the first Black Catholic Church in Houston

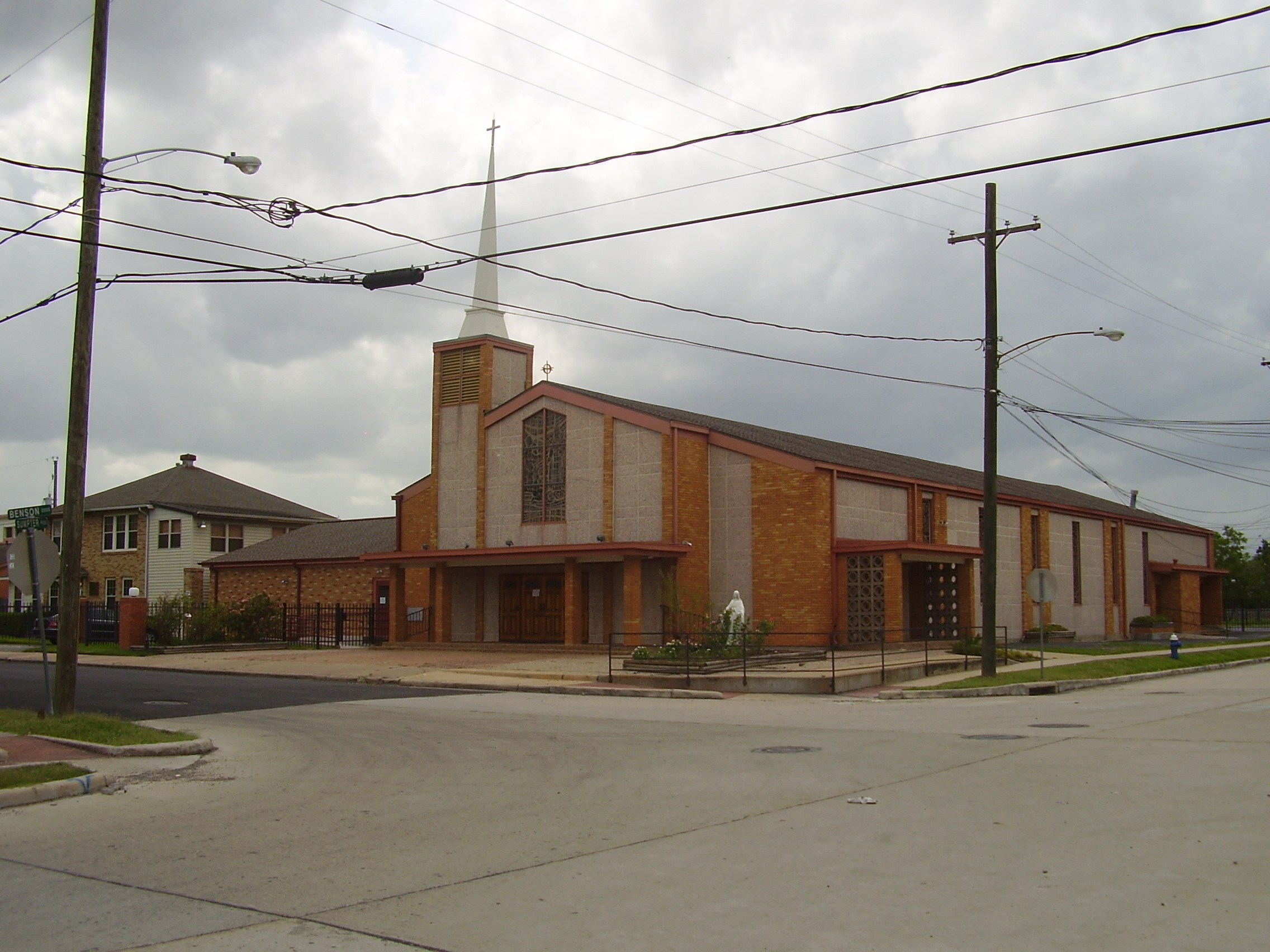
Our Mother of Mercy Catholic Church in Frenchtown

The number of African American Catholics in Houston increased after the Great Mississippi Flood of 1927 affected rural areas in the Southern United States. Most of them moved to the Fifth Ward. Due to a perception of the Catholic church being more favorable to African Americans than Protestant churches, the Catholic church in Houston increased in popularity with African Americans in the 1930s.

The oldest black church in Houston is Trinity United Methodist Church, which was started by Rev. Elias Dibble who came from Mississippi to establish churches.

The oldest Black Baptist church in Houston is the Antioch Missionary Baptist Church, historically a part of the Freedmen's Town of Fourth Ward and now in Downtown Houston. Jack Yates once served as the pastor of this church.

The city's first black Catholic church was St. Nicholas, located in the Third Ward. The Our Mother of Mercy Catholic Church in the Fifth Ward, Houston's second black Catholic church, was officially founded in June 1929. Houston area black Catholic churches have elements of Louisiana Creole culture such as zydeco parties.

In the 1920s, prior to the construction of Our Mother of Mercy, a group of Louisiana Creole people attended the Hispanic Our Lady of Guadalupe Church because it was the closest church to the Frenchtown area of the Fifth Ward. Because the Our Lady of Guadalupe Church treated the Creole people in a discriminatory manner, by forcing them to confess and take communion after people of other races, and requiring them to take the back pews, the Creoles opted to build their own church.

The number of African-American Catholics in Houston increased after the Great Mississippi Flood of 1927 affected rural areas in the Southern United States. Most of them moved to the Fifth Ward. Due to a perception of the Catholic church being more favorable to African-Americans than Protestant churches, the Catholic church in Houston increased in popularity with African-Americans in the 1930s. St. Anne de Beaupre in Sunset Heights, near the Houston Heights, is the third black church. Named after the Basilica of Sainte-Anne-de-Beaupré in Sainte-Anne-de-Beaupré, Quebec, Canada, opened in 1938. The naming after a Francophone Canadian site reflects the Louisiana Creole culture.

== Media ==
The Houston Forward Times, which began publication in 1960, is the largest black-owned newspaper in the city. The Houston Defender and the African-American News and Issues are other well established black-owned papers. The Texas Freeman was founded in 1893 and later merged to become The Houston Informer and Texas Freeman.

KCOH 1430 AM was a black-owned radio stationed started in 1953. It was a focal point for the Houston black community located at the iconic "looking-glass" studios on 5011 Almeda in Midtown Houston. KCOH launched the careers of radio personalities Michael Harris, Ralph Cooper, Don Samuel, Wash Allen. The station was purchased in 1976 by a consortium of investors, led by its general manager at the time, Michael Petrizzo. After his death in January 2012, the radio station was put up for sale. The 1430 AM signal was eventually sold to Catholic-oriented, La Promessa Foundation's Guadalupe Radio Network in November 2012. The Petrizzo family continued to own the historic building and equipment, leasing them and the 1230 AM signal to Dunn Ministries which continued the Urban Oldies format. KCOH announced in January 2016 that it has plans to move to the FM dial.

The Houston Sun was established by Dorris Ellis and Lonal Robinson in 1983. It has won more than 200 awards and recognition and presents the First Amendment Conference annually for high school and college journalism students during March, African American Press Month. Dorris Ellis was awarded the Gutenberg Press Award by the Printing Museum of Houston in 2015. The Sun's staff is made up of journalists and interns who covers city hall, school board and local community news.

== Education ==
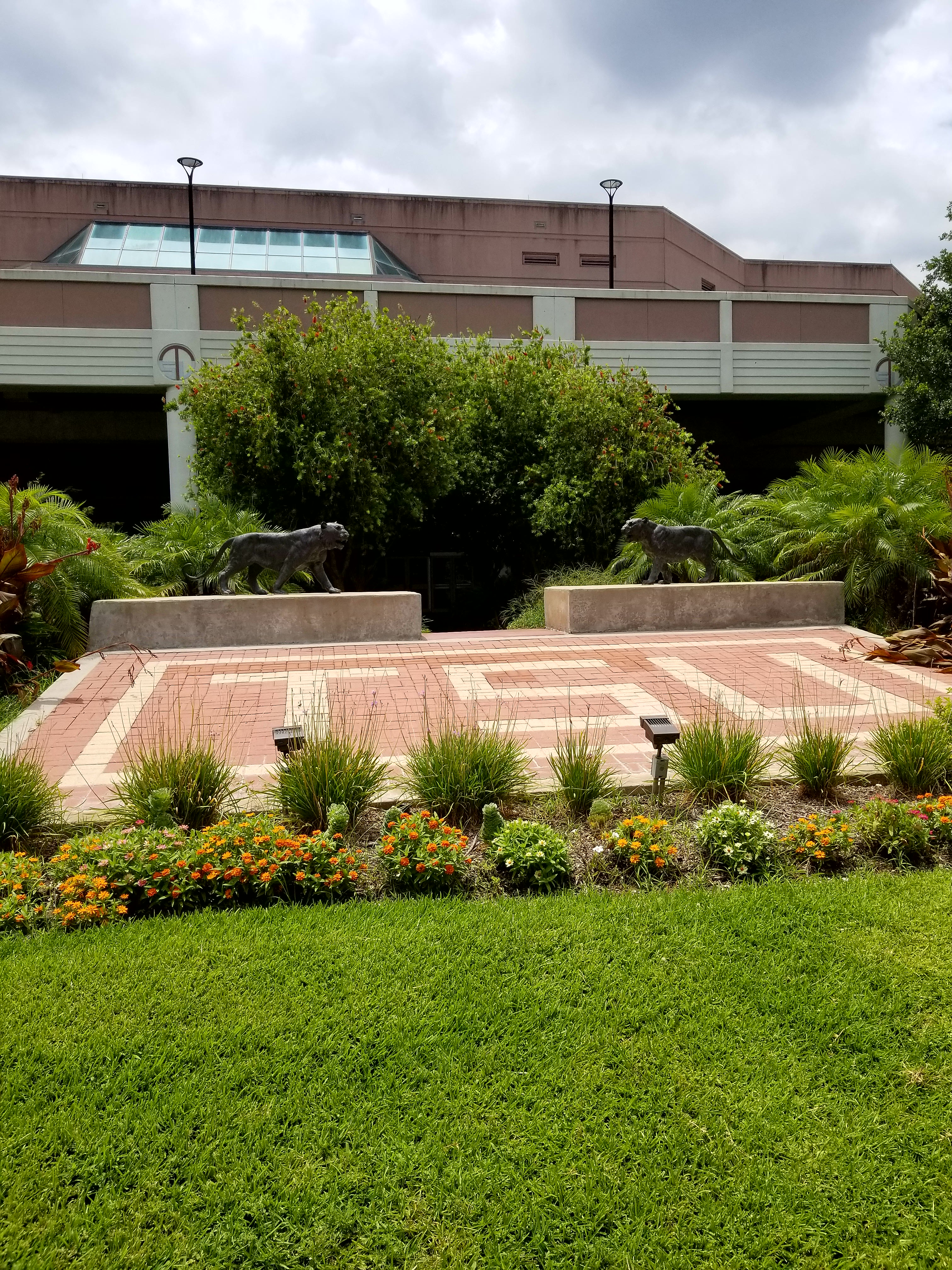
Texas Southern University

Texas Southern University is one the largest historically Black colleges (HBCUs) in the U.S. and the only HBCU fully based in Houston. Prairie View A&M University based in Prairie View, Texas (immediately northwest of Houston) is also one of the largest HBCUs in the U.S. and the second oldest public university in the state.

Historically black high schools (schools reserved for black students prior to desegregation in the 1960s) in Houston include:

- Booker T. Washington High School
- Wheatley High School
- Yates High School
- Worthing High School

Historically black middle schools include:

- Ryan Middle School (closed 2013)

The Imani School is marketed towards African-American families.

Opinions varied on whether the North Forest Independent School District (NFISD), which closed in 2013, was a "historically black" district, and therefore also the largest historically black district in the state to be closed; Kimberly Reeves of the Houston Press noted that the district had not been predominately African-American in the segregation era and remained so since desegregation, into the 1970s.

=== History of primary and secondary education ===
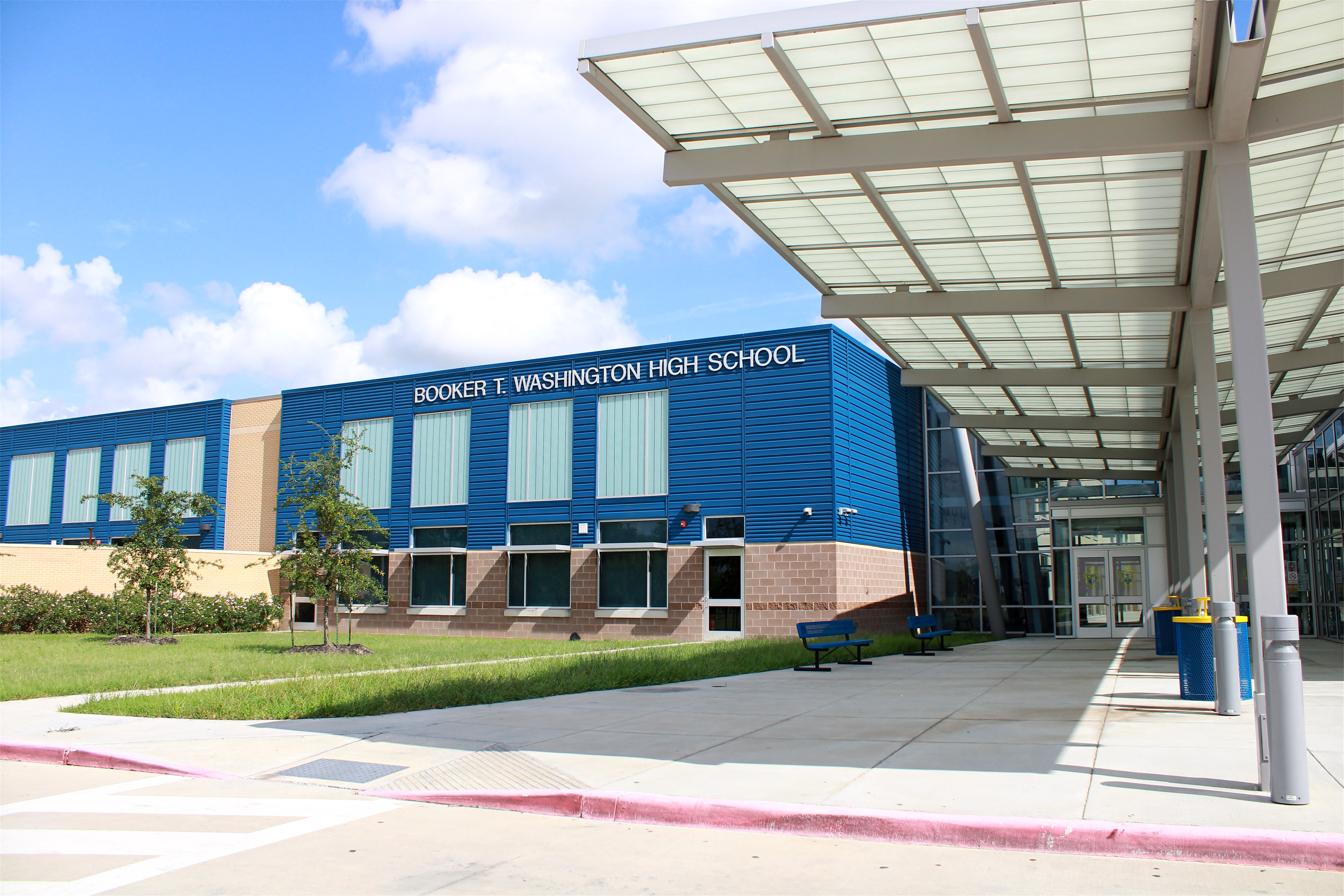
Booker T. Washington High School (current 2018 campus shown) was the first high school for blacks in Houston.

After the U.S. Civil War Freedmen's schools served black children. Later a private school in the Fourth Ward, the Gregory Institute, opened and began serving the children.

In 1892 Colored High School, the first high school for black students, opened. There were 8,293 students in Houston's schools for black students in the 1924–1925 school year. In 1925 the Houston school board announced that a new high school would open in the Third Ward, in light of the large increase in the black population. The Houston Informer stated that the schools needed to be named after prominent black people from the city and/or other successful black persons.

With the construction of the former Jack Yates High School (later Ryan Middle School), Wheatley High School, and other schools, the capacity of Houston's secondary schools for black children increased by three times from 1924 to 1929. The original secondary school for blacks, Colored High School, became Booker T. Washington High School. At the time all three secondary schools had junior high and senior high levels. There were 12,217 students in the black schools in the 1929–1930 school year. William Henry Kellar, author of Make Haste Slowly: Moderates, Conservatives, and School Desegregation in Houston, wrote that conditions in black schools "improved dramatically" in the 1920s.

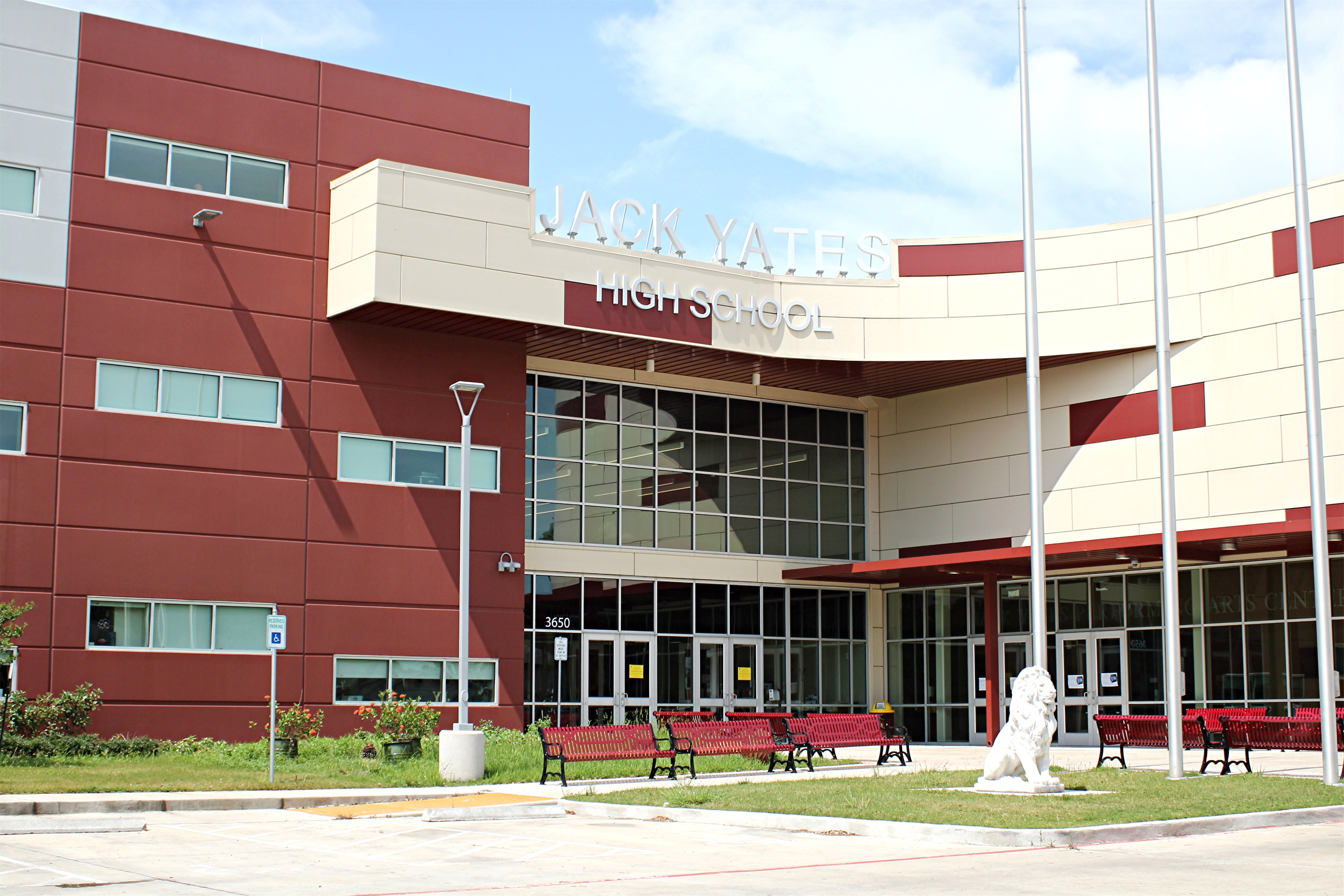
Yates High School (new campus), Houston's second black high school.

On January 27, 1958, Worthing High School opened, relieving Yates. Yates moved to its current location in September 1958. Yates's former site became Ryan Colored Junior High School (now Ryan Middle School), named after the first principal of Yates. Booker T. Washington moved to its present-day location in Independence Heights in 1959.

In Fort Bend Independent School District (FBISD), M.R. Wood School served as one of three schools for black students, including the sole black senior high school, until the district desegregated in 1965. In the Conroe Independent School District, Booker T. Washington High School was the black high school in the pre-desegregation era. Montgomery Colored School and Lincoln High School (originally Lawson High School) were the pre-desegregation schools for black students in Montgomery.

Racial desegregation of the Houston Independent School District (HISD), resulting from the Civil Rights Movement in the 1950s and 1960s, occurred in the 1970s. Yates High School began to lose upper and middle class students due to flight to the suburbs, and the establishment of magnet schools in HISD. As a result of the losses, Yates began to deteriorate. Wheatley lost its upper and middle class students due to the same factors, and in 1979 its principal, Charles Herald, stated that integration caused the best students and teachers to leave the school.

=== History of tertiary education ===
In 1927 the Yates building began housing Houston Colored Junior College, later Houston College for Negroes. The institution was later renamed Texas State University for Negroes and then Texas State University in 1951.

Former colleges for black students in the pre-desegregation era included Conroe Normal and Industrial College and Royal College.

=== Public libraries ===
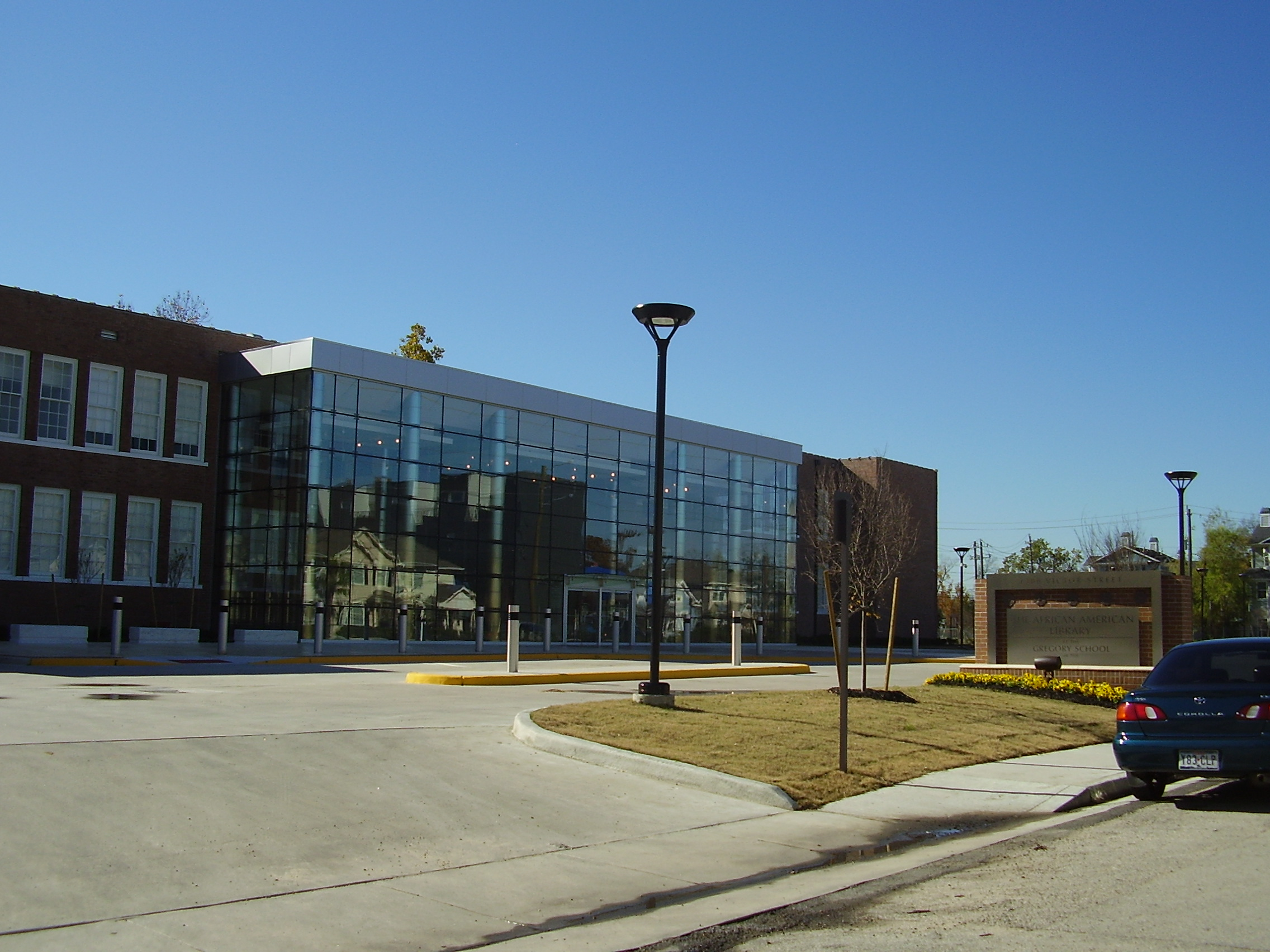
African American Library at the Gregory School

The Houston Public Library operates the African American Library at the Gregory School. The library preserves historical information about the African-American community in Houston. It is the city's first library to focus on African-American history and culture.

W.L.D. Johnson Neighborhood Library is the successor of the former Carnegie Library.

== Culture and recreation ==
=== Ensemble Theatre ===
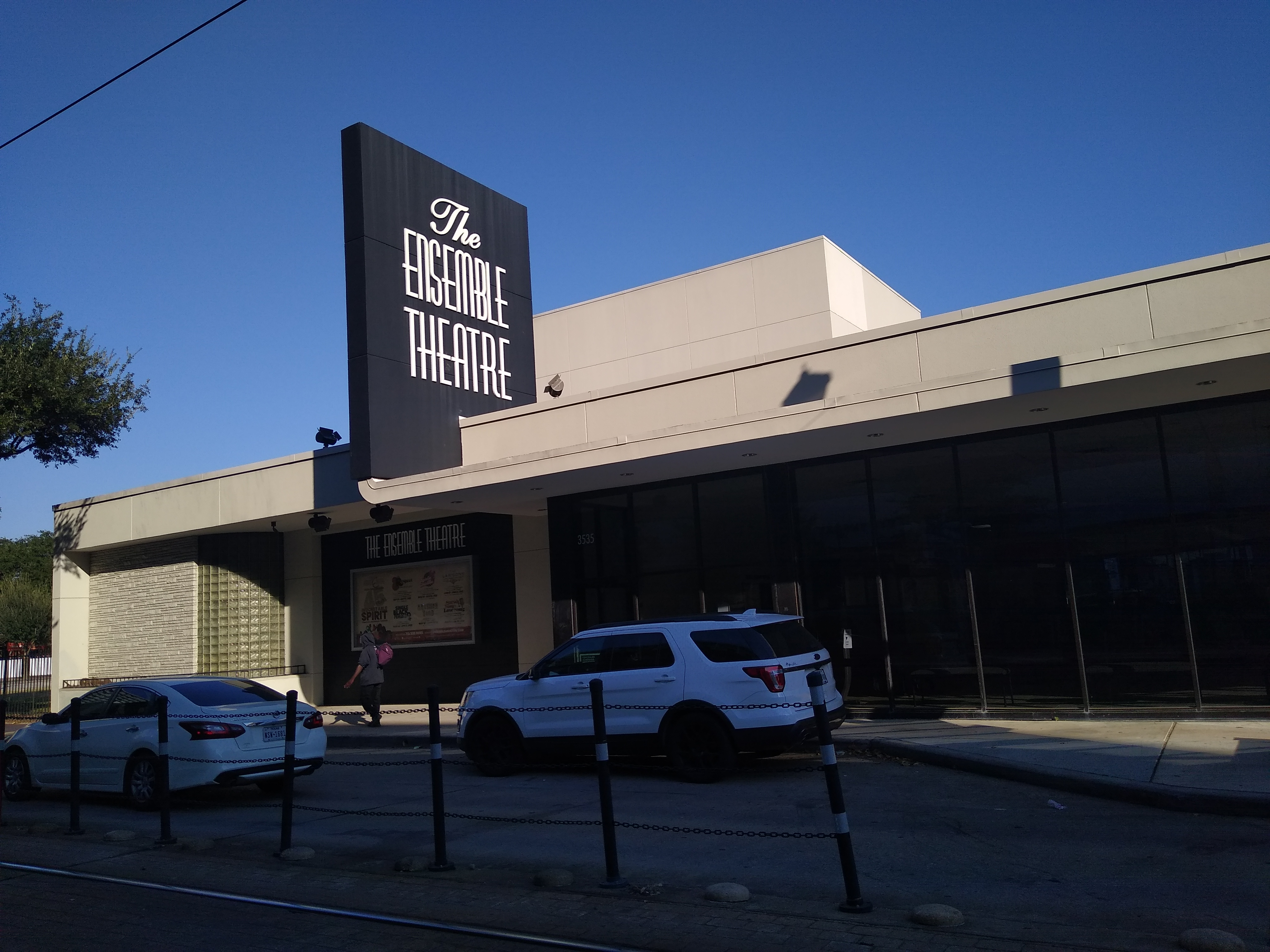
The Ensemble Theatre

The Ensemble Theatre, an African-American theater company, has its studio in Midtown. The theater, founded by George Hawkins in 1976, is the largest African-American theater company in the United States.

=== Juneteenth ===
Juneteenth is an annual celebration recognizing the emancipation of black slaves in Texas. President Lincoln signed the Emancipation Proclamation and published it on January 1, 1863, but it did not reach Galveston, Texas until June 19, 1865. Over the next few years, African-American populations across Texas collected money to buy property dedicated to Juneteenth celebrations. In Houston, the effort was led by the Reverend Jack Yates, a Baptist minister and former slave. His church, Antioch Baptist, and Trinity Methodist Episcopal Church formed the Colored People's Festival and Emancipation Park Association. In 1872, they pooled $800 to put down on ten acres of open land as home for their Juneteenth celebration. In honor of their freedom, they named it Emancipation Park.

There are several events throughout Houston commemorating this occasion. The Friends of Emancipation Park (FEP), a non-profit group of volunteers, was founded in 2007 by Dorris Ellis and Lonal Robinson to preserve and protect the interest and legacy of Emancipation Park. The FEP picked up the parade and keeps it going along with other exemplary programs. The FEP led the $33,000,000 renovation campaign to restore Emancipation Park and this campaign serves as an anchor to revitalize the Third Ward community and thwart the onslaught of gentrification. Emancipation Park, with a space of 500,000 square feet (46,000 m^{2}), is located in the Third Ward and is a popular destination for annual Juneteenth celebrations.

The State of Texas made Juneteenth a holiday at the state level after Al Edwards, a member of the Texas House of Representatives from Houston, proposed it as a bill.

=== 504 Day in Houston ===
504 Day in Houston is an annual event that celebrates New Orleans black culture.

=== Martin Luther King Day ===
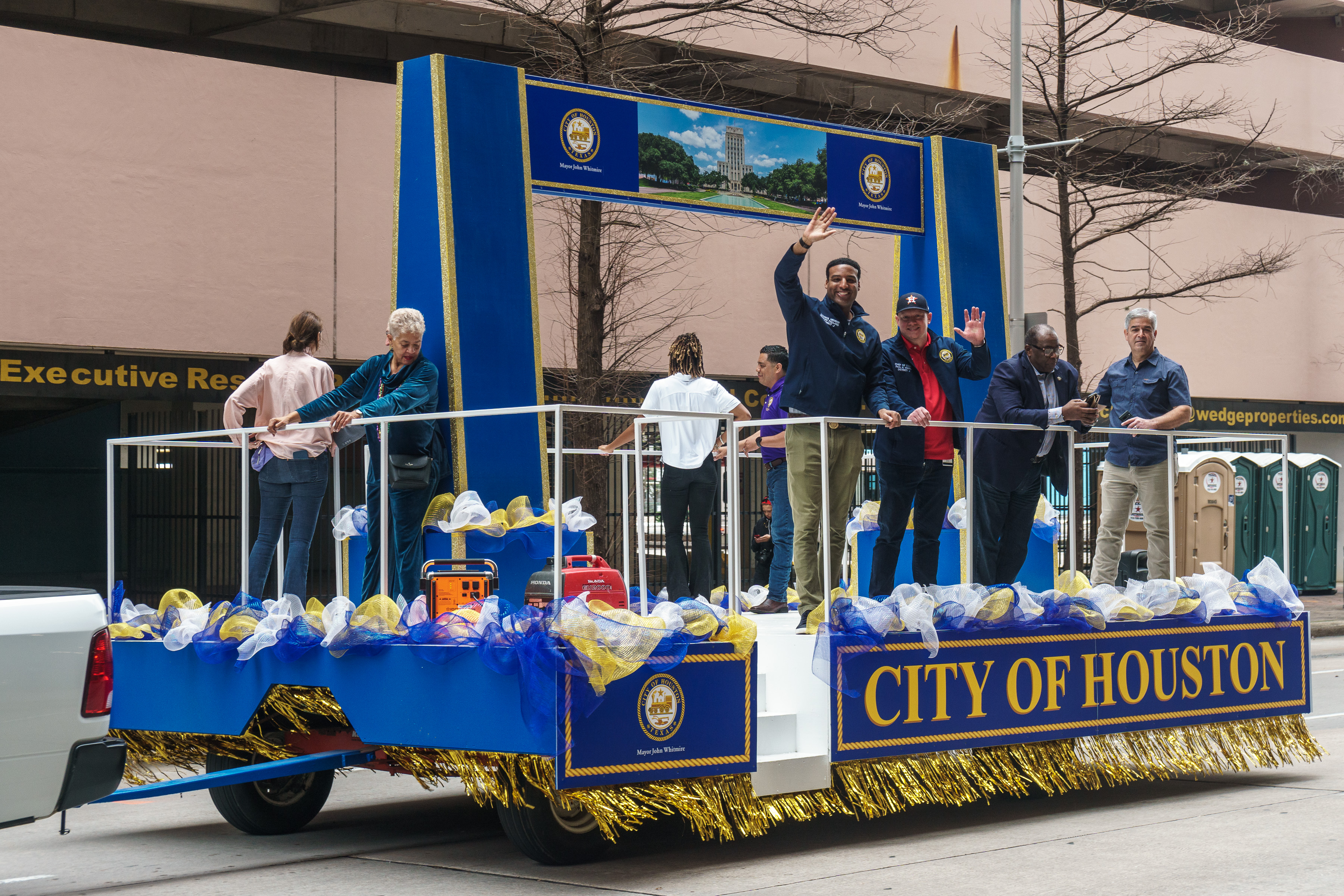
2024's "Original" MLK Birthday Parade was postponed till February 10 due to freezing weather in January

There are two rival Martin Luther King Day parades held every year. The MLK Grande Parade is held by the MLK Parade Foundation, and the other, the Original MLK Birthday Parade, is held by the Black Heritage Society. As of 2007 Ovide Duncantell was the executive director of the Black Heritage Society and Charles Stamps is the CEO of the MLK Parade Foundation.

Previously there was one MLK day parade held annually, and Stamps was a part of Duncantell's organization. In 1995, Stamps left and formed a separate parade. The two parades began competing for the favored times and days to hold their events. By 2007 the City of Houston had regulations stating that one parade can be held in Downtown Houston on a particular day. The Black Heritage Society and Duncantell sued the city in 2007 after Duncantell did not get the permit, arguing that several provisions of the ordinance enforcing the one parade per day in Downtown rule were unconstitutional. In 2007 Lee Rosenthal, a U.S. district judge, on January 10, 2007, ordered the city government to allow both parades to hold their events in Downtown Houston. By 2008 the one parade per day rule, with the prized parade day decided by a coin toss, was again in place.

The Houston Press ranked the 2006 MLK day parade, when the two rival parades joined, as the "Best Parade Houston 2006".

Service projects and voter registration drives also occur on MLK Day in Houston.

=== Black Heritage Day at Houston Rodeo ===
Every spring, the Houston Livestock Show and Rodeo dedicates a day of the festival to acknowledge and celebrate black culture. A different popular black music artist headlines and performs at the event each year.

=== Houston hip hop ===
The Houston hip hop scene is influential and recognized worldwide. Notable hip hop artists from Houston include Travis Scott, Megan Thee Stallion, Maxo Kream, Sauce Walka, Chamillionaire, Z-Ro, Big Hawk, Big Moe, Big Mello, C-Note, Devin The Dude, E.S.G., Fat Pat, Kirko Bangz, Lil' Keke, Lil' Flip, Lil' O, Lil' Troy, Mike D, Mike Jones, Slim Thug, Trae Tha Truth, Scarface and groups such as Boss Hogg Outlawz, DJ Screw, Botany Boyz, Geto Boys, and Screwed Up Click.

=== Texas Southern–Prairie View rivalry ===
The Texas Southern University versus Prairie View A&M University athletic events are a major draw for blacks in the Houston area, particularly for black alumni of these institutions. The Labor Day Classic is the only HBCU football classic in the Houston area. The basketball games in the winter always draw large crowds and interest on both campuses.

=== National Battle of the Bands ===
Since 2019, Houston has been home to one of the largest collegiate marching band events in the nation. Annually over 40,000 fans and spectators show up to the NRG Stadium to see several HBCU band programs perform and help raise money for them.

=== Houston Black Restaurant Week ===
Houston is renowned for its restaurants and cuisines. For two weeks every year, many black-owned restaurants and black culinary professionals participate in this event that highlights their contributions to the city's food scene.

=== Houston Black brunch and nightlife culture ===
Houston's Black brunch and nightlife culture have grown to become highly prominent in the United States. Social media has played a major role in brunch and nightlife in the city becoming a top destination for Black adults around the world (especially Nigerians). Unlike most cities, Houston offers many popular restaurants, bars, lounges, clubs, and events that culturally caters to Black adults.

=== Black LGBT pride ===
Houston is home to one of the largest black LGBT communities in the nation. Houston's black LGBT community annually celebrate its presence during a special event called "Splash", which organizes gay and lesbian events in order to improve the cultural, environmental, medical and social health of gay men, lesbian and transgender people of African descent. It is the oldest black gay event in Texas beginning in 1988.

== Cemeteries ==
Humble Negro Cemetery is in the suburb of Humble. Evergreen Negro Cemetery is located in Fifth Ward. Olivewood Cemetery is in White Oak Bayou.

== Gentrification ==
Gentrification has notably changed most of Houston's historically black neighborhoods, especially those within Loop 610 and near Downtown Houston. Rising housing costs coupled with a housing shortage have displaced some black residents and deterred some new black residents from moving in. A high number of blacks have moved to suburban cities or outside Loop 610 of Houston seeking a more affordable cost of living or lower crime. For example, Third Ward went from 71% black in 2010 to 45% black in 2020. The white population in Third Ward grew 170% from 2010 to 2020. The median home price in Third Ward in 2010 was $124,500, by 2023 it increased to nearly $400,000. Also Third Ward's average rent price increased notably since 2010. The Houston Housing Authority is actively working to provide more affordable housing to help those with low-to-moderate incomes desiring to live near the city's largest business district.

== Notable people ==
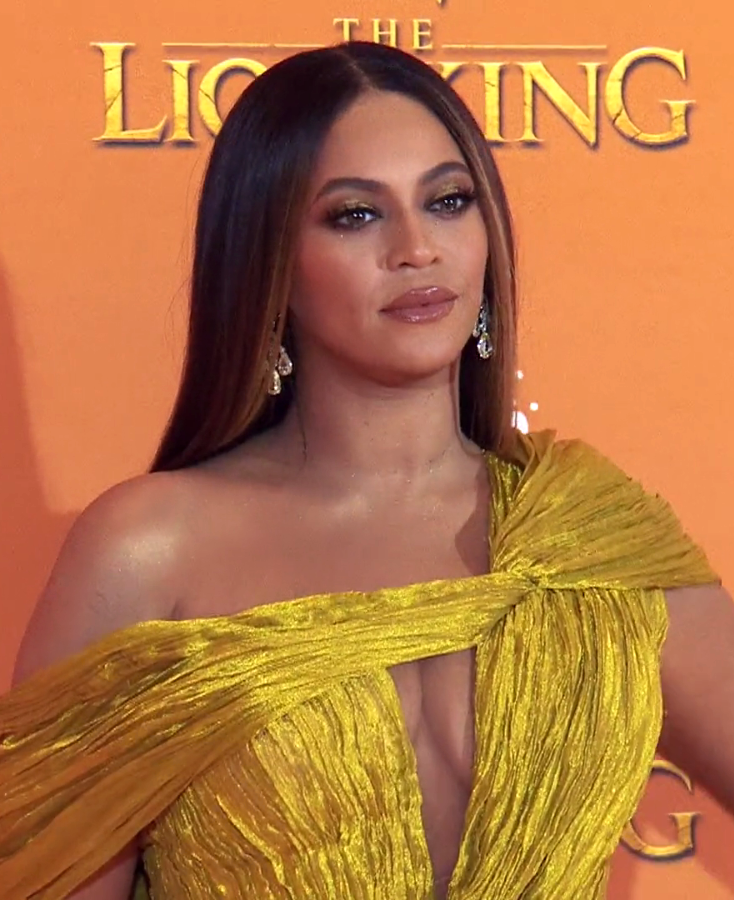
Beyoncé

- Phylicia Rashad, actress
- Quanell X (Quanell Ralph Evans), leader and national chairman of the New Black Panther Nation
- Debbie Allen, actress
- Beyoncé (Beyoncé Giselle Knowles-Carter), singer and songwriter, entrepreneur and actress
- Kelly (Kelendria Trene Rowland-Witherspoon), singer and songwriter, entrepreneur and actress
- Travis Scott, rapper
- Solange, singer and songwriter, entrepreneur and actress
- Mathew Knowles, music mogul, entrepreneur and educator
- LeToya Luckett, singer and songwriter, entrepreneur and actress
- Megan Thee Stallion, rapper
- Don Toliver, singer and rapper
- Lizzo, singer and rapper
- Trae tha Truth, rapper
- Scarface, rapper
- Arizona Fleming, activist
- H-town, R&B group
- Ideal, R&B group
- Isiah Washington, actor
- Simone Biles, gymnast
- Brittney Griner, basketball player
- Michael Strahan, athlete and TV personality
- Yolanda Adams, singer
- Christia Adair, civil rights activist
- Richard Allen, politician
- Michael Arceneaux (author of I Can't Date Jesus)
- Slim Thug, rapper and entrepreneur
- Mike Jones, rapper and entrepreneur
- Kirko Bangz, rapper
- Lee P. Brown, former mayor of Houston
- Robert D. Bullard, sociologist
- Kirbyjon Caldwell, pastor of the Windsor Village United Methodist Church
- Chamillionaire (Hakeem Seriki), rapper
- Percy Creuzot, founder of Frenchy's Chicken
- Ruth Simmons, academic
- Normani, singer, dancer
- Loretta Devine, actress
- J. E. Franklin, playwright
- Jennifer Holliday, actress, singer
- Rodney Ellis, prominent political official and businessman
- Fat Tony (Anthony Obi), rapper
- George Foreman, Olympic Gold medalist, two-time Heavyweight Champion, entrepreneur
- Van G. Garrett, poet
- Lightnin' Hopkins, singer-songwriter, pianist, and guitarist
- Lenwood Johnson, activist
- Vince Young, former NFL player
- Rashard Lewis, former NBA player
- Barbara Jordan, congresswoman
- Elwyn Lee, University of Houston administrator
- Sheila Jackson Lee, congresswoman
- Mickey Leland, congressman
- Thaddeus S. Lott Sr., school principal in Houston ISD
- Rod Paige, former Houston ISD superintendent and U.S. Secretary of Education
- Dr. Anthony B. Pinn, professor, Rice University
- James Prince - music executive, promoter and manager, CEO of Rap-a-Lot Records
- Monica Roberts, writer and transgender rights advocate
- Sylvester Turner, mayor of Houston 2016–2024
- Bun B, Rapper and entrepreneur
- Jack Yates, Baptist minister
- John Brown Bell, 19th-century businessman, real estate investor and civic leader
- Roland S. Martin, journalist
- George Floyd, police murder victim and former rapper

== See also ==
- Riverside Terrace
- Emancipation Park
- History of the African Americans in Texas
  - History of African Americans in Dallas-Ft. Worth
  - History of African Americans in San Antonio
  - History of African Americans in Austin
- Ethnic groups in Houston
- Demographics of Texas
- Down in Houston
- Black Dixie
- Changing Perspectives
- Black cowboys
- Afro-Mexicans
- History of Mexican Americans in Houston
- History of Central Americans in Houston
- Hispanics and Latinos in Houston
- Demographics of Houston
- History of Pakistani Americans in Houston
- History of Vietnamese Americans in Houston
- History of the Jews in Houston
- History of the Japanese in Houston
- History of the Korean Americans in Houston
- History of Chinese Americans in Houston
- Asian Americans in Houston

== Bibliography ==
- Beeth, Howard and Cary D. Wintz (editors). Black Dixie: Afro-Texan History and Culture in Houston (Volume 41 of Centennial Series of the Association of Series). Texas A&M University Press, June 1, 2000. ISBN 0890969760, 9780890969762.
- Kellar, William Henry. Make Haste Slowly: Moderates, Conservatives, and School Desegregation in Houston. Texas A&M University Press, 1999. ISBN 1603447180, 9781603447188.
- Pruitt, Bernadette. The Other Great Migration: The Movement of Rural African Americans to Houston, 1900-1941 (Sam Rayburn Series on Rural Life, sponsored by Texas A&M University-Commerce). Texas A&M University Press, October 24, 2013. ISBN 1603449485, 9781603449489.
- Steptoe, Tyina Leaneice (University of Wisconsin–Madison). Dixie West: Race, Migration, and the Color Lines in Jim Crow Houston (PhD thesis for a history degree). ProQuest, 2008. ISBN 0549635874, 9780549635871.
- Steptoe, Tyina L. Houston Bound: Culture and Color in a Jim Crow City (Volume 41 of American Crossroads). University of California Press, November 3, 2015. ISBN 0520958535, 9780520958531. p. 117.
- Changing Perspectives
