= Lorenzo Greene =

American historian

Lorenzo Johnston Greene (1899–1988) was an American educator who taught history at Lincoln University in Jefferson City, Missouri from 1933 to 1972. His book, Missouri's Black Heritage, co-authored by Antonio Holland and Gary Kremer, was a pioneering work on the African-American experience in Missouri. He co-authored several works and his historical diaries and notes have been used in other historical texts, such as Selling Black History for Carter G. Woodson. He worked with Carter Woodson, who was known as the "Father of Black History".

Excerpts of his diary appeared in Black Dixie, a book about African-Americans in Houston.

== Timeline ==
- 1899, Nov.16 Born, Ansonia, Connecticut
- 1924 B.A., Howard University, Washington, D.C.
- 1926 M.A. in history, Columbia University, New York, N.Y.
- 1928 – 1933 Field representative and research assistant to Carter G. Woodson, director, Association for the Study of Negro Life and History, Washington, D.C.
- 1930 Published with Carter G. Woodson The Negro Wage Earner Washington, D.C.: Associated Publishers. 388 pp.)
- 1931 Published with Myra C. Callis The Employment of Negroes in the District of Columbia (Washington, D.C.: Associated Publishers. 89 pp.)
- 1933 – 1972 Instructor and professor of history, Lincoln University, Jefferson City, Mo.
- 1942 PhD in history, Columbia University, New York, N.Y. Published The Negro in Colonial New England, 1620–1776 (New York: Columbia University Press. 404 pp.) Married Thomasina Talley
- 1955 Chairman, program committee, Association for the Study of Negro Life and History annual meeting, Los Angeles, Calif.
- 1947 – 1956 Editor, Midwest Journal, Lincoln University, Jefferson City, Mo.
- 1964 Chairman, program committee, Association for the Study of Negro Life and History annual meeting, Detroit, Mich.
- 1959 – 1961 Chairman, SubCommittee on Education, Missouri Advisory Committee to the United States Commission on Civil Rights
- 1965 – 1966 President, Association for the Study of Negro Life and History
- 1971 Honorary LH.D., University of Missouri, Columbia, Mo.
- 1971 – 1972 Director, Institute for Drop-Out Prevention and Teacher Orientation, Jefferson City, Mo.
- 1972 – 1974 Director, Institute to Facilitate Desegregation in Kansas City Public Schools, Kansas City, Mo.
- 1980 Published with Antonio F. Holland and Gary Kremer Missouri's Black Heritage (St. Louis: Forum Press. 195 pp.)
- 1988, Jan. 24 Died, Jefferson City, Missouri
- 1988 Posthumous publication of Working with Carter G. Woodson, the Father of Black History, a Diary, 1928–30 (Baton Rouge: Louisiana State University Press. 487 pp.)

== See also ==
- African American history
