= Working with Carter G. Woodson, the Father of Black History =

Diary written by Lorenzo Greene

- Title page for Working with Carter G. Woodson, the Father of Black History: A Diary, 1928–1930 (1989)
- Editor: Arvarh E. Stickland
- Author: Lorenzo Greene
- Publisher: Louisiana State University Press
- Publication date: 1989

Working with Carter G. Woodson, the Father of Black History: A Diary, 1928–1930 is a diary written by Lorenzo Greene published in 1989 by the Louisiana State University Press and edited by Arvarh E. Strickland. Robert L. Harris of Cornell University described it as "one of the few documents that provide insight into the early growth of the field of Afro-American history and the life of Woodson".

== Background ==
Greene, at the time a graduate student at Columbia University, worked for the Association for the Study of Negro Life and History (ASNLH), established by Carter G. Woodson.

Greene began preparing his diary for publication prior to his death in 1988.

A portion of his diary was also published in Black Dixie (1992).

Woodson did not leave an autobiography of his own. This contributed to Greene's decision to have these memoirs published.

At the time of the publication of this book, Greene's descendants had then-unpublished diary segments that took place before and after the time of this work.

== Contents ==
Strickland wrote an introduction to the book that contains biographies of Woodson and Greene. Claudine Ferrell of Mary Washington College wrote that Strickland's introduction, along with this editing and the introductory comments from Greene himself, "are invaluable in setting the stage for a work that helps fill, to a small degree, the huge gap in the information on Woodson's tireless and influential work and on black life in the 1920s." Merton L. Dillon of Ohio State University wrote that the introduction was "graceful".

Greene began writing in his diary on March 15, 1928, the first day of the job; he was hired at age 28, in March 1928. Originally he believed that Woodson's goal in documenting African-American history was fruitless and that he should have been teaching at an elite university. The book has information on Greene, Woodson, and Charles H. Wesley. Greene wrote in his diary every night during his day work at the ANSLH, recording his observations of the black community of Washington, D.C., and Baltimore prior to the Great Depression. Amy Worden in Washington History stated that it was "written mostly in a staccato fashion".

In particular it discusses the middle strata of the DC black community, along with the daily routine of blacks in not only DC but also Virginia and Baltimore. He had conducted interviews in Baltimore and Washington, DC. The diary discusses his life in Washington, DC as well as his organization of his research. He also recorded his time during an unfinished assignment to survey black churches. In addition it discusses the academic rivalry between Woodson and Wesley, Greene's conflicting feelings as an African-American, and his personal conflicts with W.E.B. DuBois. Greene's final entry, which documented a Negro Week event, was on February 10, 1930. After that entry Woodson fired Greene. By the end of the book Greene came to believe in Woodson's mission. Greene credited Wesley for the book being published.

Dillon wrote that Greene was not sympathetic towards religion and had conservative beliefs and skeptical feelings towards religious preachers, and therefore the diary was filtered through this mindset. The diary also includes some statements made by Woodson.

Bruce Collins of the University of Buckingham stated that according to the diary, the people in Greene's generation were opposed to black churches and therefore were unable to make much progress in their communities at the time; Collins also stated that "The diary offers ample testimony to a belief in the need to establish a full and true history of American blacks."

== Reception ==
Ferrell wrote that the book was a discussion of current events, attitudes, and problems in the contemporary African-American community in addition to, as Greene had described it, "a melange of happenings and opinions" about "a potpourri of the economic, social, and political conditions under which Negroes lived in their communities"; Ferrell argued that the book met Greene's definition and that its value resides in that.

== Sources ==
- Collins, Bruce (University of Buckingham) (1991). "Review of Working with Carter G. Woodson, the Father of Black History: A Diary 1928–1930". History. 76 (248): 457–458. ISSN 0018-2648. JSTOR 24421413.
- Dillon, Merton L. (Ohio State University) (1990). "Review of Working with Carter G. Woodson, the Father of Black History: A Diary, 1928–1930". The Register of the Kentucky Historical Society. 88 (3): 362–363. ISSN 0023-0243. JSTOR 23381755.
- Ferrell, Claudine L. (Mary Washington College) (1991). "Review of Working with Carter G. Woodson, the Father of Black History: A Diary, 1928–1930". The Journal of Southern History. 57 (2): 350–351. doi:10.2307/2210455. ISSN 0022-4642. JSTOR 2210455.
- Harris, Robert L. (Cornell University) (1991). "Review of Working with Carter G. Woodson, the Father of Black History: A Diary, 1928–1930". The Journal of American History. 77 (4): 1400–1401. doi:10.2307/2078364. ISSN 0021-8723. JSTOR 2078364.
- McMillen, Neil R. (University of Southern Mississippi) (1990). "Review of Working With Carter G. Woodson, the Father of Black History: A Diary, 19281930". The Georgia Historical Quarterly. 74 (3): 541–543. ISSN 0016-8297. JSTOR 40582214.
- McMurry, Linda O. (North Carolina State University) (1990). "Review of Working with Carter G. Woodson, the Father of Black History: A Diary, 1928–1930". The North Carolina Historical Review. 67 (2): 278–279. ISSN 0029-2494. JSTOR 23521282.
- Worden, Amy (1992). "Review of Working with Carter G. Woodson, the Father of Black History: A Diary 1928–1930". Washington History. 4 (2): 81–82. ISSN 1042-9719. JSTOR 40073076.
