= Houston Forward Times =

Newspaper in Houston, Texas, US

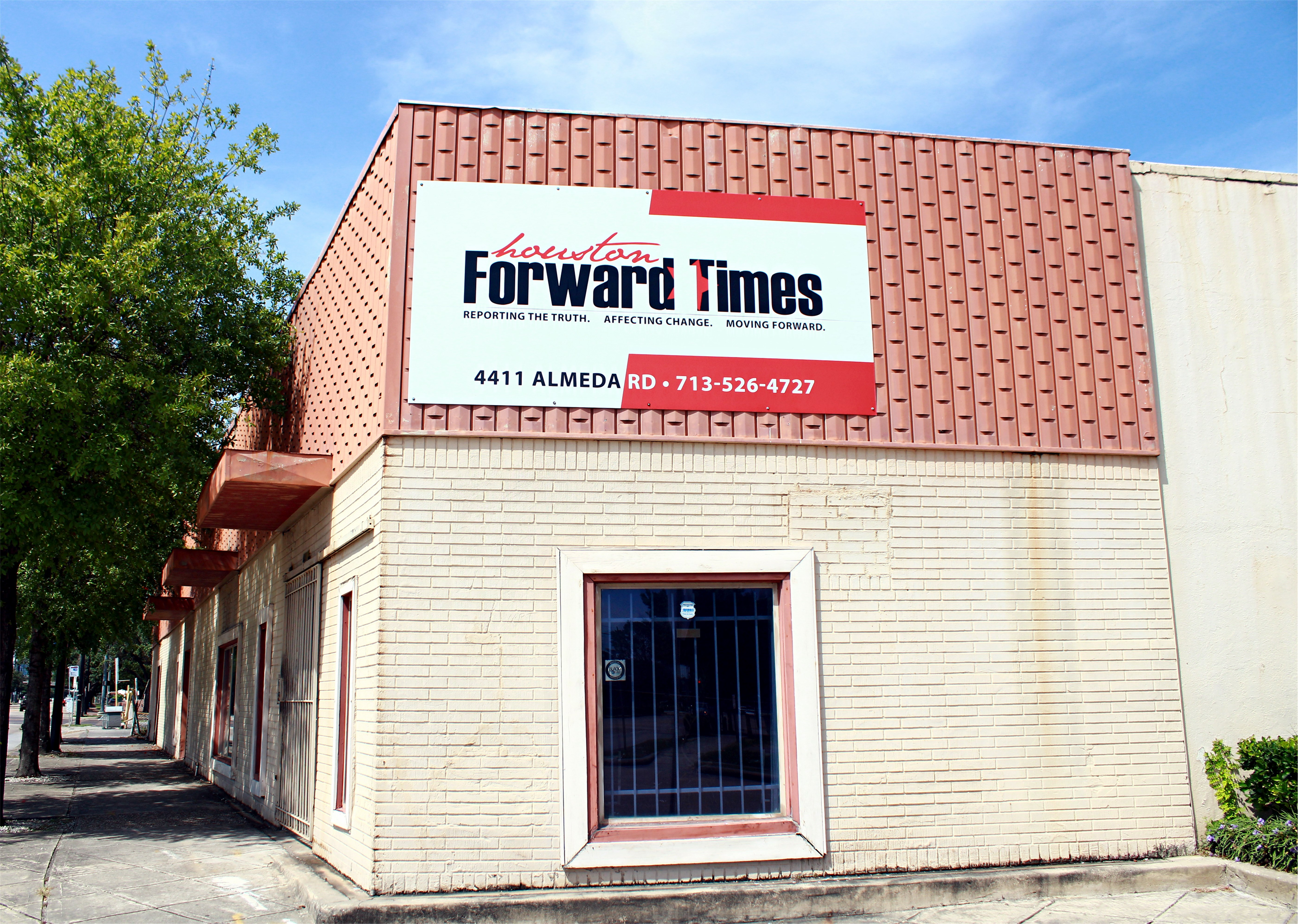
- Headquarters
- Type: Weekly newspaper
- Format: Broadsheet
- Owner: Forward Times Publishing Company
- Publisher: Julius Carter; Lenora Carter; Karen Carter Richards
- Founded: 1960; 66 years ago
- Headquarters: Houston, Texas, United States
- Circulation: 17,970 in the 1990s
- Website: forwardtimes.com

The Houston Forward Times (FT) is a weekly newspaper headquartered in Houston, Texas. It is one of the largest black-owned newspapers in the city. It is published by the Forward Times Publishing Company, which also publishes other publications such as the Daily Cougar. As of 2014, the FT is one of the few remaining self-printing black newspapers.

Julius Carter started the newspaper, which opened in 1960:

Julius wanted the Forward Times to be a cutting-edge paper, providing the Black community with news that was relevant to them, as opposed to simply sharing generic national stories or promoting social and church events. Most of the issues and stories that were important to the Black community were either ignored or not picked up by the mainstream White press. This made the Forward Times even more relevant, because it became a primary source of getting information out to the Black community about stories and issues affecting them.

Carter died in 1971 and his wife, Lenora Carter, took over the operations of the newspaper. The Forward Times Publishing Company began publishing it in 1977. She continued to publish and edit the newspaper, and was continuing to do so in the 1990s.

The circulation was 17,970 in the 1990s.

Lenora Carter died on April 10, 2010. Karen Carter Richards, daughter of Julius and Lenora Carter, continues as the CEO and Publisher of the Forward Times. In September 2010 the Julius and Lenora Carter Scholarship and Youth Foundation was established, which publicly benefits low- and/or medium-income graduating seniors and college students of private and public schools within the Greater Houston Metropolitan area, and also interns students through the Forward Times Publishing Company.

On October 2, 2015, the Forward Times celebrated 55 years of being in print, "reporting the truth, and giving back to the community" with a cover feature and a benefit concert, with the proceeds going to the Julius and Lenora Carter Scholarship and Youth Foundation.

== See also ==
- African-American News and Issues
- Houston Defender
- History of African Americans in Houston
