= Humble Negro Cemetery =

African-American cemetery in Harris County, Texas

Details
- Abandoned: 1965
- Location: Humble, Harris, Texas
- Country: United States
- Coordinates: 30°0′23″N 95°15′43″W
- Type: Private
- Owned by: Unknown
- No. of graves: 55
- Find a Grave: Humble Negro Cemetery

The Humble Negro Cemetery is located in Harris County, Texas, just north of the City of Humble. It is located about 200 yards north of the FM 1960 by-pass which runs along the north side of Humble and east of the railroad tracks and U.S. Highway 59.

== History ==
Humble was incorporated as a city in 1933. At that time, by vote of the City Council, racial segregation was invoked to make the town "lily white". The black population was forced to relocate their families as well as the graves of their dead to another location, outside the city limits. Starting in 1933, blacks began to move out of Humble and by 1935, almost all had.

A sawmill north of Humble was owned by Mr. Bender, one of the founders of Humble. Blacks migrated from Gladysville, Cleveland, Splendora and Fostoria to work there.

Also, Mr. Borders had a sawmill west of Humble. He reportedly gave the African Americans who worked for him some property to live on. The area was known as Bordersville after the name of the owner of the sawmill. When they were made to live outside the "border" of incorporated Humble, many of them moved to the Bordersville area.

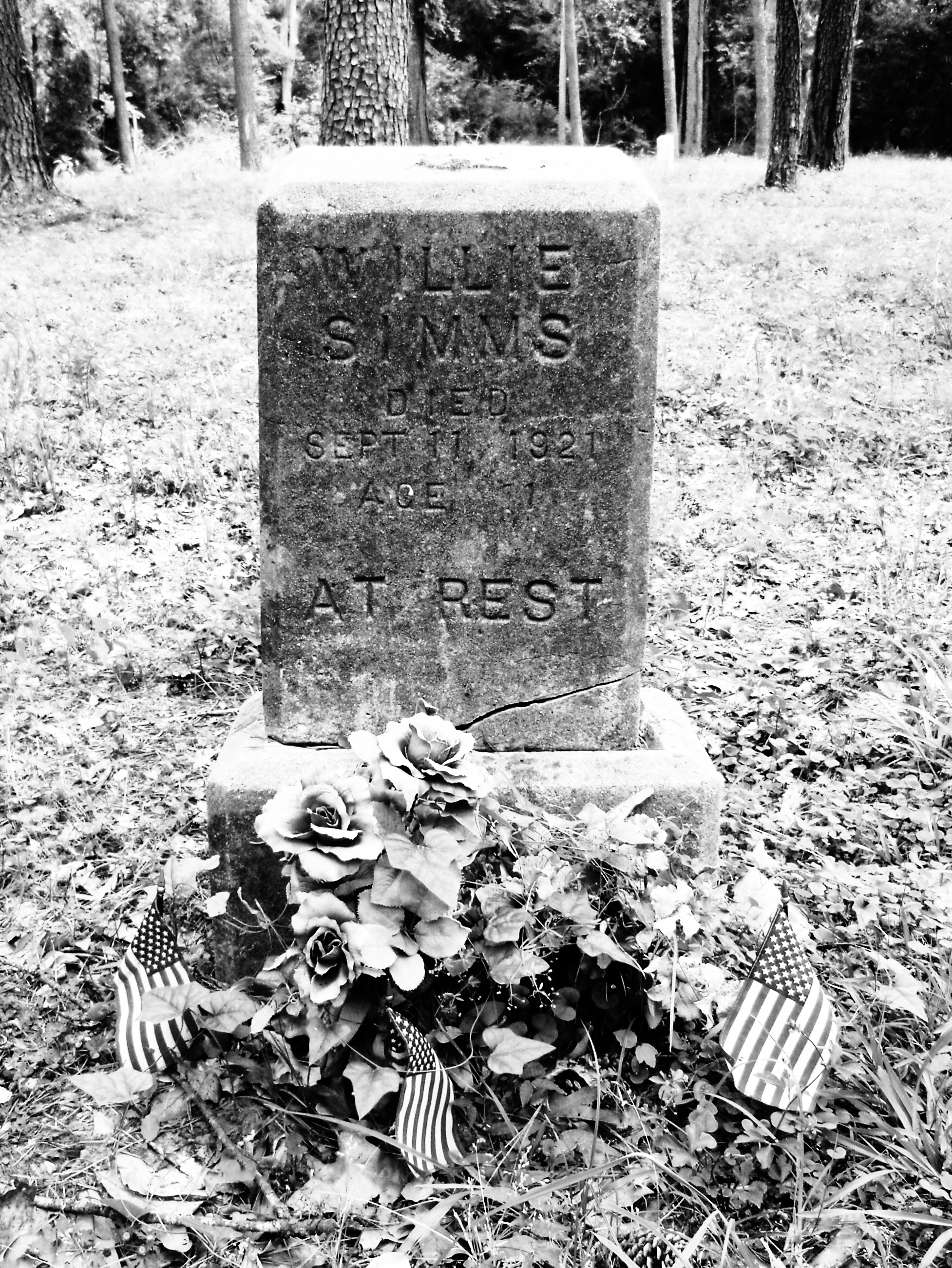
Gravestone of a boy named Willie Simms who died September 11, 1921, at the age of 11, and was buried in the Humble Negro Cemetery, otherwise known as the "Pipe Yard Cemetery"

Over the years, the cemetery was abandoned and became overgrown. In 2005, the members of Grace Church, a multicultural church located in Humble, sought permission from the owners of the land to clean and restore it, something they had hoped and tried to do for a long time. After receiving clearance from the City of Humble and the Texas Department of Transportation, Grace Church spent many thousands of dollars putting in a road, clearing hundreds of trees, and working with local historians to restore the cemetery. To honor the war veterans who are buried there, the church also installed a flagpole and U.S. flag station. In 2013, the church was working to have a historical marker placed at the site. While hoping to return the cemetery to the loved ones of the deceased, the church committed to cover all maintenance and upkeep.

In 2008, there was an incident that involved disturbing one of the graves and desecrating one of the bodies interred there. This incident brought the cemetery back into the public eye. The pastors of Grace Church oversaw the re-interment of the body.

== Recent work ==
The gravesites are not arranged in rows or plots and only a few stones remain. They are randomly placed. Many of the graves are unmarked, or the stones have been removed. Very few if any records were kept and several people have since desecrated the graveyard by reducing the graves themselves to a pile of rubble.

== See also ==
- History of the African Americans in Houston
