= Thomasina Talley Greene =

African-American concert pianist and educator

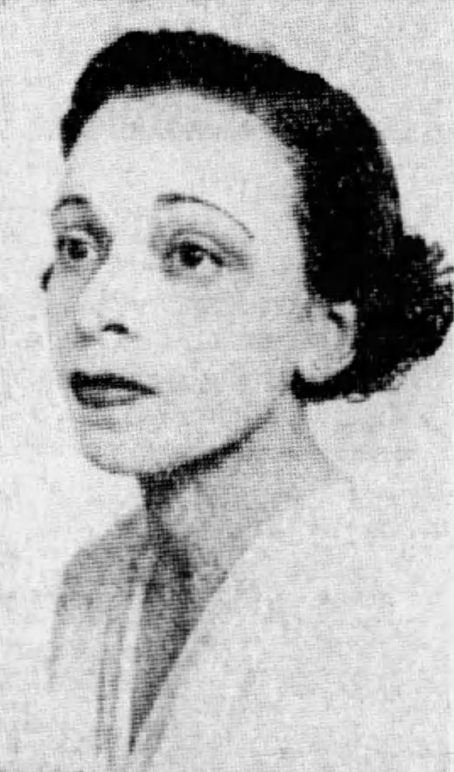
- Thomasina Talley, c. 1942
- Born: Thomasina Talley; 29 June 1913; Nashville, Tennessee, US
- Died: 1 June 2003 (aged 89); Jefferson City, Missouri, US
- Occupations: concert pianist and music educator

Thomasina Talley Greene (1913–2003) was an African-American concert pianist and music educator who opened a music studio in 1942 in Jefferson City, Missouri. She was honored as a 1963 Missouri Woman of Achievement for her outstanding contribution to the arts, including a memorable recital at Lincoln University.

== Biography ==
Born on 29 June 1913 in Nashville, Tennessee, Thomasina Talley was the daughter of Thomas Washington Talley (1870–1952) and Ellen Eunice née Roberts. She was the family's second child, following Sonoma Talley (born 1900), who was also a music teacher. Their interest in music was no doubt encouraged by their father, who was not only head of the chemistry department at Fisk University but took a keen interest in American music and conducted the Fisk choir.

Thomasina Talley was taught to play the piano from the age of five. She graduated from Fisk University in 1929 and went on to study piano at . New York's Juilliard School, receiving a diploma in 1932. After teaching for a period at the high school in Columbia, Missouri, she moved first to Texas and then to North Carolina. In 1939, thanks to a Rockefeller fellowship, she was able her to complete her studies at Columbia University in 1942. She was a member of Alpha Kappa Alpha sorority.

While at Columbia, Talley fell in love with the historian Lorenzo Greene (1899–1988). The couple moved to Jefferson City where Thomasina opened a music studio and taught on occasion at Lincoln University. They married on 19 December 1942 and had one child, Lorenzo Thomas (born 1952).

In 1969, Greene was professionally recognized as a teacher of applied music for piano in any state in the union by the Certification Board of the Music Teachers National Association. From 1966 to 1977, she was associated with the television music station KRCG, which aired programming prepared by the Rhapsodic Junior Music Club, which Greene directed.

Thomasina Talley Green died in Jefferson City on 1 June 2003.
