= Down in Houston =

2003 book by Roger Wood

Down in Houston: Bayou City Blues
- Author: Roger Wood
- Language: English
- Series: Jack and Doris Smothers Series in Texas History, Life, and Culture
- Release number: 8
- Genre: Non-fiction
- Publisher: University of Texas Press
- Publication date: 2003
- Publication place: United States

Down in Houston: Bayou City Blues is a 2003 book written by Roger Wood, with photographs from James Fraher, published by the University of Texas Press; it is No. 8 of the Jack and Doris Smothers Series in Texas History, Life, and Culture. Down in Houston discusses the African-American musical culture that was established in Houston, Texas, particularly that of the Third Ward and Fifth Ward. Larry Willoughby of Austin Community College described the book as "an oral history, a socio-cultural study, a beautifully photographed pictorial, and a musicologist's primary source bonanza."

== Development ==
Wood, who taught English classes at Houston Community College (HCC) Central College since his relocation to Houston in the early 1980s, decided to study blues music when he decided that, in his words, "formed the primal headwaters of a cultural river that I had been swimming in for years" (page 5). His interest was piqued when he read a 1982 Houston Chronicle article about the death of musician Lightning Hopkins and realized that the church which held the funeral was in proximity to his workplace. Therefore the time from the conception of the idea to publication of the book was about twenty years.

The work on the book itself took around ten years, Wood began partnering with Fraher in 1995. There were about 150 hours worth of interviews used in researching the book.

== Contents ==
The book, printed on glossy paper, uses a large page format and has photographs of various Houston musicians and musical venues; there are over 100 photographs, many of them black-and-white, and some of them period pieces. The book does not have footnotes.

It chronicles how different kinds of Blues music resulted from class differences, and the book discusses blues performers of both genders. Houston natives and people from other cities who moved to Houston and developed their music there are described in the book.

There are a total of seven chapters. The opening of the book discusses Lightnin' Hopkins, and other artists such as Bobby "Blue" Bland, Gatemouth Brown, Albert Collins, Johnny Copeland, Clifton Chenier, Miss LaVelle, and Katie Webster are discussed. It also tracks the evolution of Houston blues and the national prominence of the Duke-Peacock recording company and head Don Robey; the book argued that Robey's abilities to record and sell blues music helped establish rock and roll music in the United States.

Bill Cunningham of Texas Books in Review stated that "the most entertaining portion" of Down in Houston was the discussion of contemporary blues musicians, even though blues music had declined in Houston and throughout the U.S. by then.

== Reception ==
Howard Beeth of Texas Southern University concluded that the "richly textured" Down in Houston "is in the tradition of valuable documentary work pioneered by John A. Lomax" and that the book "is a substantial addition to the good, hard work" done on the Southern cultural history and music of African-Americans in Texas.

Willoughby wrote that the book doubles as a "fun and rewarding" work for people who enjoy music and also "a valuable cultural study as a neighborhood, its people, and its music survived and flourished from Jim Crow through the Civil Rights Movement."

Ruth Sullivan of Texas State University-San Marcos gave a positive review, and praised the "wonderful photographs".

== See also ==
- Culture of Houston
- History of the African Americans in Houston

Other books about African-Americans in Houston:

- Black Dixie
- Make Haste Slowly
