= Houston Defender =

African-American newspaper established in 1930

- Type: Weekly Newspaper
- Format: Tabloid
- Founder: C.F. Richardson Sr.
- Publisher: Sonceria Messiah-Jiles
- Editor: ReShonda Tate
- Associate editor: Aswad Walker
- Founded: 11 October 1930 (95 years ago)
- Language: English
- Headquarters: 12401 South Post Oak; Houston, Texas 77045
- Country: United States
- Sister newspapers: Campus Defender
- OCLC number: 14393467
- Website: defendernetwork.com

The Houston Defender is an African-American newspaper published weekly in Houston, Texas. The newspaper was established October 11, 1930 by C. F. Richardson Sr., who was also publisher of the Houston Informer. The Defender served as a community advocate in the pre-Civil Rights era with a focus on equal rights, improved high school curricula and anti-lynching laws.

Richardson died in 1939, and his son, C. F. Richardson Jr., took over the newspaper. Sonceria Messiah-Jiles purchased the newspaper in 1981. The 2008 readership was 60,000.

In 1993 the bi-monthly Campus Defender was created for a younger audience; its contributors are middle and high school students. The publication moved online in 2008.

== See also ==
- Houston Forward Times
- African-American News and Issues
- History of the African-Americans in Houston
