= African-American News and Issues =

American newspaper published in Houston, Texas

- Type: Weekly newspaper
- Founder(s): Roy and Sherly Malonson
- Founded: 1996
- Language: English
- City: Houston, Texas
- Website: aframnews.com

African-American News and Issues (AANI) is a weekly African-American newspaper published in Houston, Texas. The newspaper is distributed to zip codes that have the largest concentrations of African Americans within the state of Texas. Circulation is estimated at 312,818. It has been described as "Texas' widest circulated and read newspaper with a Black perspective." It was established as a newspaper serving Acres Homes in 1996.

== See also ==
- Houston Forward Times
- Houston Defender
- History of the African Americans in Houston
