= Yale Building =

Apartment building in Chicago, Illinois

- The Yale
- U.S. National Register of Historic Places
- Chicago Landmark
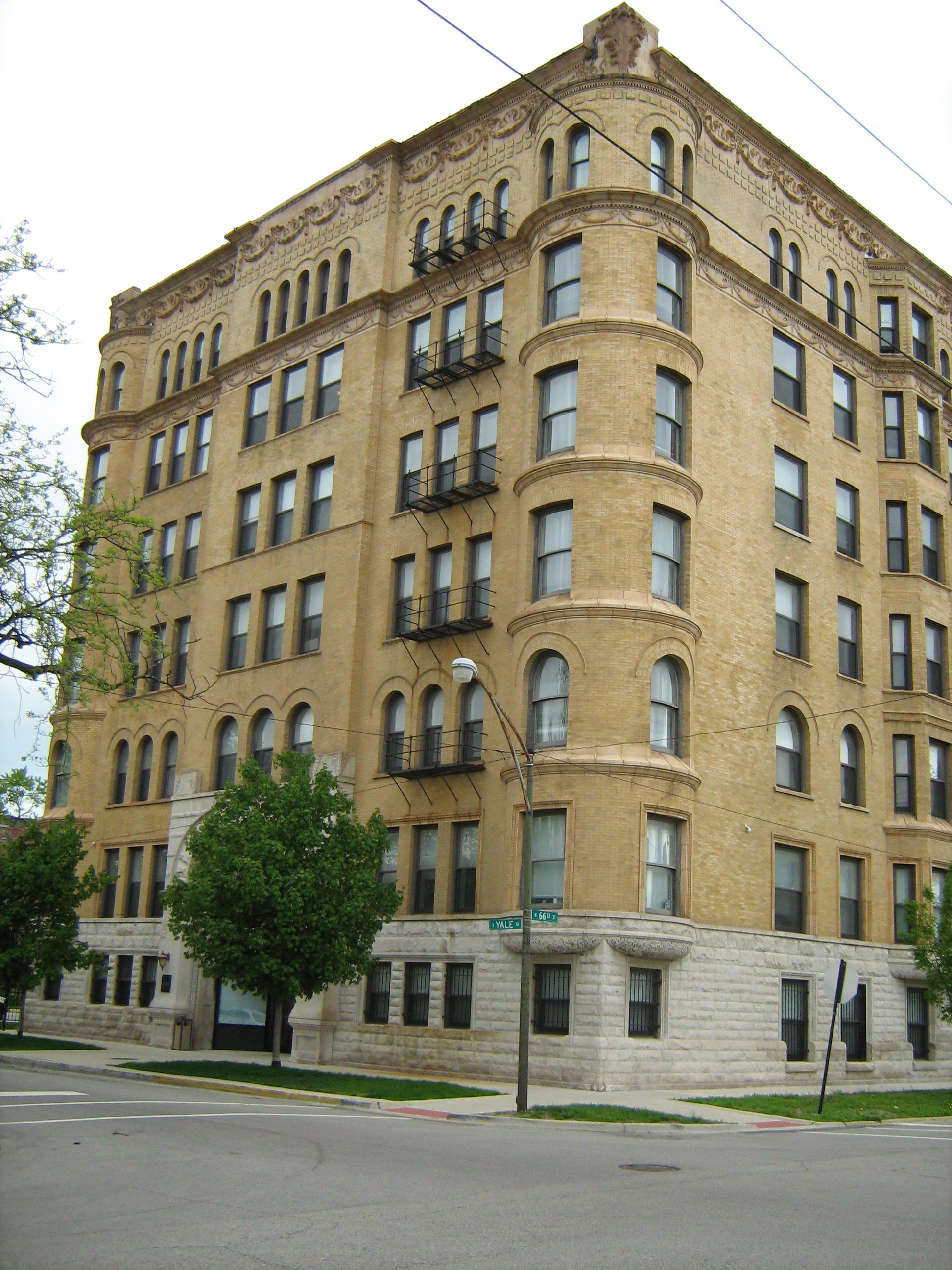
- The Yale Building

- Location within Chicago metropolitan area Location within Illinois Location within the United States
- Location: 6565 South Yale Avenue, Chicago, IL
- Coordinates: 41°46′28.06″N 87°37′53.39″W
- Built: 1892
- Architect: John T. Long
- Architectural style: Romanesque
- NRHP reference No.: 98000178

Significant dates
- Added to NRHP: March 5, 1998
- Designated CHICL: April 9, 2003

The Yale Building, also known as The Yale, is a seven-story building located in the Englewood neighborhood of Chicago, Illinois. It is an important "first generation" residential high-rise, a building type made possible by advances in building structure and technology, and reflects the great growth in real estate development which typified the city in the 1890s. The building is a large-scale example of Romanesque Revival architecture style popularized by the buildings of Henry H. Richardson, and exhibits excellent craftsmanship in both materials and detailing. It was built in 1892 as accommodation for the upcoming World's Columbian Exposition. The Yale Apartments also possesses a rare interior atrium, ringed with galleries and topped by a glass-and-metal skylight. It has been described as one of Chicagos "best-kept secrets" after being featured during the 2016 Open House Chicago.

The building was listed on the National Register of Historic Places on March 5, 1998, and later designated a Chicago Landmark on April 9, 2003.

The Yale was originally built as luxury apartments for the Chicago Exposition. In the late 1930s/early 1940s, the empty building was purchased and the interior gutted and converted to studio, 1 and 2 bedroom apartments. One top floor apartment had the addition of a staircase up to a rooftop room referred to as the penthouse. It was renovated in 2003 and now features 69 apartments for low-income senior citizens.

== In popular culture ==
- The building appears in S1E5 of the TV show ER.
- The building appears in S8E8 of the TV Show Shameless (American TV series)
