= Black Dixie =

Black Dixie: Afro-Texan History and Culture in Houston
- Paperback edition
- Editor: Howard Beeth, Cary D. Wintz
- Genre: Essay Collection
- Publisher: Texas A&M University Press
- Publication date: 1992

Black Dixie: Afro-Texan History and Culture in Houston is a 1992 book edited by Howard Beeth and Cary D. Wintz and published by Texas A&M University Press. It is a collection of thirteen essays about the history of African-Americans in Houston. It was the first scholarly book to provide a comprehensive history of Houston's black community, and the book's dust jacket referred to it as the first such book of any city in the Southern United States.

== Background ==
The two editors were members of the Texas Southern University history department.

== Contents ==
The book is divided into four sections, with the introduction being the first section and the others containing essays; the three essay sections are organized by theme.

There are a total of thirteen essays, which cover the 19th century and 20th century. They were not written specifically to be included in the book. Most of the essays were previously unpublished; while four were reprinted from academic journals, with three from the Houston Review of the Houston Public Library Houston Metropolitan Research Center; and two were primary sources. In total, two primary sources and seven articles were first published in this book. Of the essays not made by first-hand observers, eight were written by historians and three were written by sociologists. Howard Beeth wrote the opening section, and the editors provide introductions and commentary in the other sections.

The commentaries in the introductions of each article address social history, religion, and fraternal organizations, things not discussed in the essays themselves. Joseph A. Tomberlin of the Mississippi Quarterly wrote that "Linking the sections through the introductions gives the volume greater unity than one might expect in such a collaborative enterprise."

=== First section ===
Beeth's opening section, "Historians, Houston, and History," discusses the state of scholarship in the newly emerging field of urban studies; he stated that academics previously had biases against urban history and local history, there were very few such studies in previous eras, and there had been a lack of preservation of sources prior to the 1970s. In addition Houston's post-secondary institutions had not yet fully developed, and he added that there had previously been a lack of interest in the history of Houston, but research interest in local history began to increase at area universities and Houston's changing character also attracted interest in its history.

=== Second section ===
The first collection of essays focuses on the 19th century.

Tamara Myner Haygood in "Use and Distribution of Slave Labor in Harris County, Texas, 1836–60" described the role of slaves in Houston as well as surrounding parts of Harris County. Haygood argued that slavery was important in developing Harris County as the economic patterns established during slavery continued to exist.

Barry A. Crouch in "Seeking Equality: Houston Black Women during Reconstruction" describes the role of women in trying to gain civil rights during the Reconstruction Era; much of the research originated from the archives of the Freedmen's Bureau.

"Richard Allen: The Chequered Career of Houston's First Black State Legislator" by Merline Pitre was originally printed in an academic journal. Pitre argued that the origins of the black middle class, which she characterized as "articulate, talented, and manipulative", may be explained by studying politicians like Allen. Alwyn Barr of Texas Tech University stated that Pitre described Allen as being "able but ambitious". Since Allen never left any personal papers behind, Joseph A. Tomberlin of the Mississippi Quarterly stated that Pitre had to use "less satisfactory sources"; he argued that while the situation was not her fault, the lack of sources related directly to Allen affected the quality of her essay.

=== Third section ===
The second collection discusses the late 19th Century and early 20th Century.

In "The Emergence of Black Business in Houston Texas: A Study of Race and Ideology, 1919–45," James M. SoRelle wrote about African-American businesses and how they, in order to attract black investors and customers, appealed to racial solidarity and pride as well the idea of "self-help" within the black community. SoRelle criticized Black Bourgeoisie by E. Franklin Frazier, which had argued that the black middle class was greedy, since the book had rejected the concept of black leaders needing to respond to Jim Crow and how these leaders were committed to their race too easily. SoRelle also argued that boosterism from African-American organizations became an important part of Houston's "business progressivism".

Frances Dressman, in "Yes, We Have No Jitneys!': Transportation Issues in Houston's Black Community, 1914–1924," wrote about the rise and fall of black jitney services, which initially competed with trolley lines until the city government began shutting several of them down; this essay was originally published elsewhere. In particular it discusses the San Felipe Jitney Line.

One primary source article is a diary entry written by Lorenzo J. Greene, a Connecticut man educated at Columbia University, and an associate of Carter G. Woodson, who visited the city during a two-week period in September 1930 where he sold books for the Association for the Study of Negro Life and History, in order to generate income for the institution. Greene later chaired the history department of Lincoln University. The essay documents his impression of Houston. Historian Quintard Taylor described it as "a fascinating glimpse into the internal dynamics of the black community and a detailed description of the impact of the economic depression on black workers in Houston." S. Charles Bolton of the University of Arkansas at Little Rock stated that this was a "cheerful account" despite the lack of funds held by Greene and his organization. Ralph A. Wooster of Lamar University described Greene's article as "a revealing and not always flattering picture" of the leadership of the city's African-American community. Louis J. Marchiafava of the Houston Public Library wrote that Greene has an "outsider's perspective". Lorenzo Hirsch of the University of New Orleans wrote that "Certainly Greene's positive impression of black education in Houston contrasts sharply with James M. SoRelle's analysis in a later piece."

The other primary source article is "Houston's Colored Citizens: Activities and Conditions among the Negro Population in the 1920s," a 1928 article written by that was published by Clifton F. Richardson in a Houston area publication, the liberal white magazine Civics. Richardson was an NAACP chapter president and the founder of the Houston Informer. This article discusses the elite of the city's black community. John H. Haley of the University of North Carolina at Wilmington stated that it was "a glowing assessment of black citizens of "Heavenly Houston," using a term employed by people promoting the city.

Taylor characterizes the two primary source articles as "two of the most impressive entries". Alwyn Barr of Texas Tech University described the Greene and Richardson sources as "slightly more optimistic descriptions of business and social leaders and institutions in the period."

=== Fourth section ===
The final collection discusses 20th century efforts to end discrimination against black people. SoRelle discusses the discrimination in public schools, accommodations, transportation, and other publicly used facilities; as well as police and Ku Klux Klan-related violence, between World War I and World War II, arguing that conditions were more severe than, in the words of Barr, "Houston's popular image of the period suggested."

Robert V. Haynes, in "Black Houstonians and the White Democratic Primary, 1920–45," described the effort to end an all-white primary in the Democratic Party in the period 1920–1940, which culminated in Smith v. Allwright and the disestablishment of the said primary; this essay was originally published elsewhere.

F. Kenneth Jensen wrote about 1960 and 1961 sit-ins by Houston students, from Texas Southern University, at lunch counters at a Weingartens shop. According to Jensen, this resulted in the end of several discriminatory practices. Jensen argued that the urbanization of blacks augmented their resistance against discriminatory laws. Haley describes the conclusion as "somewhat doubtful".

Cecile E. Harrison and Alice K. Lain's piece discusses the rise and fall of Operation Breadbasket from 1966 through 1974.

Robert A. Bullard wrote about contemporary issues facing black people in the working class, stating that housing difficulties were occurring with low and moderate income individuals; at the time the conditions of housing of many blacks were poor, and most blacks lived in black neighborhoods. Bullard had previously published his own book and this essay is a further explanation of his previous point.

The final chapter was written by Robert Fisher, who documented the city government's resistance against government programs and the effects of privatization; the author believes that many of the city's problems resulted from excess privatization. Haley stated that Fisher perceived as Houston "as the epitome of the privatized city". Hirsch stated that the chapter has "some theoretical applications".

== Reception ==
The book won the September 1993 Ottis Lock Award for the Best Book on East Texas History.

=== Book reviews ===
Barr wrote that the book "is a valuable contribution that adds diversity to a general sense of the African- American and southern urban experience" and that "the chapters generally reflect sound research and thoughtful analysis" even though "some conclusions may stir debate".

Bolton wrote that the book "is an excellent example of African-American history, of urban history, and of collaborative effort."

Haley argued that the book demonstrated that "the black experience in Houston was quite similar to that in other places in the South"; he criticized how the book primarily used the viewpoint of elites, documented "only facets of the black experiences", and neglected the "experience of the black masses". He believed the introductions and essays "are imbalanced and often too narrowly focused." In addition he stated the book "hardly touched upon" the issue of African-American and Hispanic and Latino relations.

Hirsch concluded that while the book is "a helpful initial reconnaissance" that has "interesting bits of information and insights scattered throughout", the book does not provide any comparisons nor does it give "a clear overall conception" of the black community in Houston, and therefore there is still "the need for a broader, deeper, and more focused treatment."

Marchiafava concluded that even though it "is not intended to be the final word on African Americans in Houston, the book is a major contribution for its effort to fill in a major gap in the city's history."

Taylor praised several of the articles, saying that the ones about Slavery and the post-U.S. Civil War Reconstruction Era "are among the strongest in the book". Taylor argued that while the book did discuss failed attempts to establish a black elite in Houston, the book had not covered adequate ground on describing relations between blacks and Hispanics and Latinos, the roles of socio-civic groups such as the NAACP, churches, fraternal orders, nor the overall economic structure of black Houston.

Wooster wrote that the book has "well written" essays that are "based upon solid research in primary and secondary materials" and that the book "is a major contribution to our understanding of urban black culture in the South." He argued the book should have included ethnic composition maps and a chapter about the last quarter of the 19th century.

== See also ==
Other books about African-Americans in Houston:

- Down in Houston
- Make Haste Slowly
