= Buffalo Soldiers National Museum =

Military museum in Houston, Texas, US

Coordinates: 29.7360°N 95.3781°W

Buffalo Soldiers National Museum

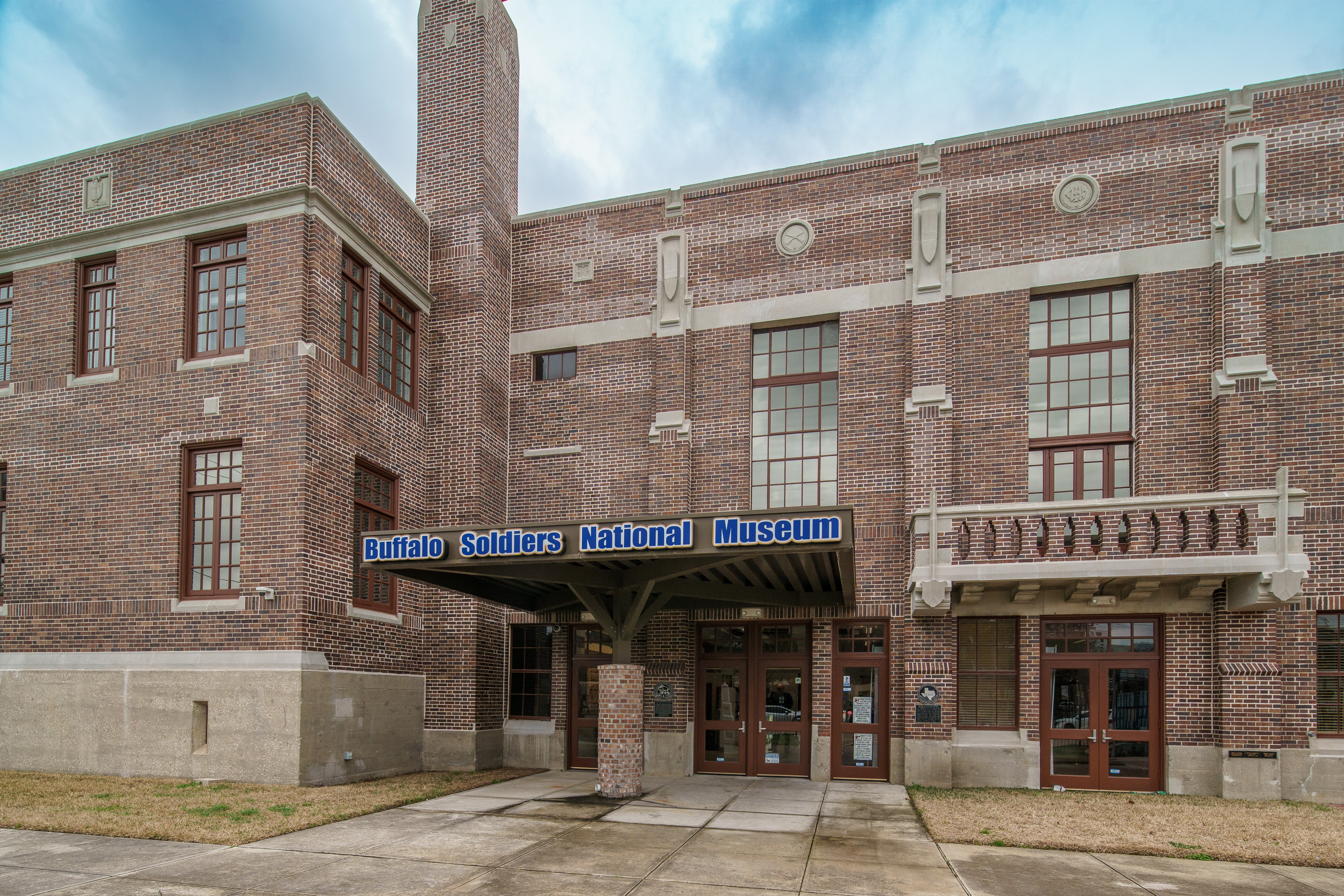
Entrance in the rear of the Houston Light Guard building

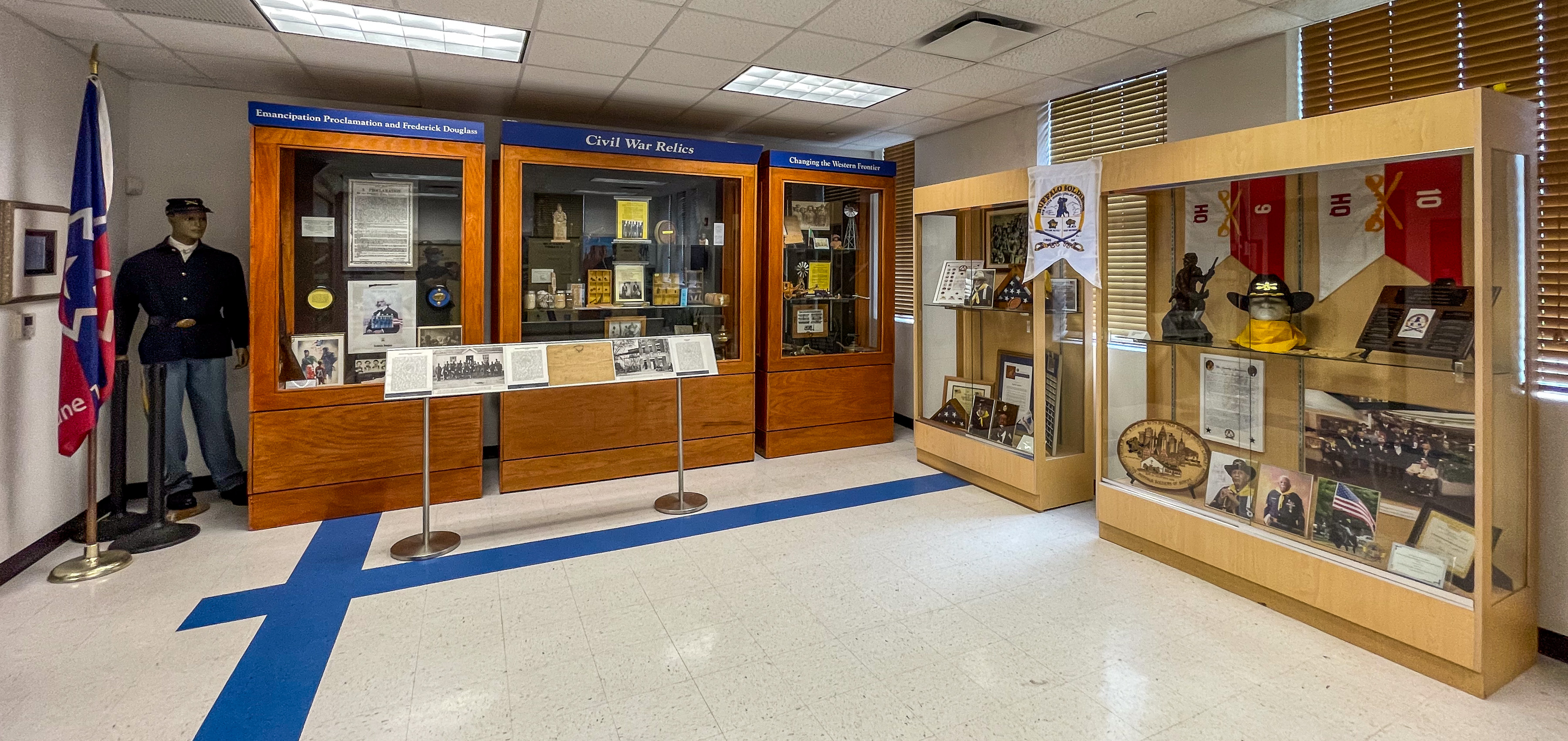
Inside

The Buffalo Soldiers National Museum, located in Houston, Texas, is a museum dedicated to the history and achievements of Buffalo Soldiers and African American soldiers from all of the branches of the United States Military.

== Founding ==
The museum was founded in 2001 by Vietnam veteran and military historian, Captain Paul Matthews.

== Collection and programs ==
Captain Matthews collected African American military memorabilia for thirty years prior to opening the museum. Many of the items in the museum's collection were donated by Matthews.

The museum is open to the public for tours and events.

== Building ==
The museum moved from 1834 Southmore Blvd to 3816 Caroline Street in 2012. The new location, a building originally built in 1925, was the former headquarters the Houston Light Guards.

In 2022, the museum received a grant from the National Trust for Historic Preservation's African American Cultural Heritage Action Fund to be used for building repairs.
