= Make Haste Slowly =

1999 book by William Henry Kellar

- Author: William Henry Kellar
- Publisher: Texas A&M University Press
- Publication date: 1999
- Pages: 226
- ISBN: 9780890968185

Make Haste Slowly: Moderates, Conservatives, and School Desegregation in Houston is a 1999 book by William Henry Kellar, published by Texas A&M Press, which discusses school desegregation in Houston, Texas, involving the Houston Independent School District. The book's main focus is 1954–1960.

The book's title originates from a statement from a member of the HISD board of education, who asked the district to "make haste slowly" in response to a court order stating that schools should be integrated "with all deliberate speed".

In 2003 Benjamin H. Johnson of Southern Methodist University wrote in Texas Books in Review that "The battles over desegregation so vividly described by William Kellar are really the middle chapters of a still-unfinished story", citing magnet schools causing tension regards related to de facto segregation as well as the decline of HISD infrastructure and the decrease of HISD's tax base.

== Background ==
Sources used by the author included testimonies from minutes from HISD school board meetings, newspaper archives, and oral histories.

== Content ==
The initial portions of the book discuss pre-World War II Houston's race relations and segregation. Chapters 4–7 discuss the debates and disputes within the HISD school board in regard to how it should handle its upcoming desegregation. The final chapter of the book includes material about a failed secessionist movement from a predominantly White community wishing to avoid desegregation, the demographic changes and white flight from HISD, and an assessment of Brown v. Board of Education.

Thomas R. Cole of the University of Texas Medical Branch described chapters 4–7 as the "real contribution" of the book.

== Reception ==
Cole concluded that the book has "useful comparisons" to school district desegregation in other Southern cities and new information regarding Houston's desegregation. Cole criticized the "wobbly narrative structure", arguing that the author failed to "bring new insight" to the participants of Houston's school desegregation and that the book did not "bring the story to life" because the book only relied on printed sources with some oral history interviews. The book did not state whether television footage of the school board meetings existed and/or whether Keller had attempted to locate it. In addition Cole stated that Keller had provided "little evidence" for the argument that the business community had caused the peaceful desegregation, even though the claim was plausible.

Michael Fultz of the University of Wisconsin-Madison wrote that the book, a "more or less readable account", presents anti-desegregation efforts "convincingly and depicted in their true ugly light." Fultz stated that the book had some editorial issues: duplicate phrasing, and disparate quotes. Fultz wrote that some of Kellar's arguments were "somewhat plausible" but should have been backed up by more documentation.

Merline Pitre of Texas Southern University wrote that the book is "well-researched and well-organized", and she recommended the book for undergraduate and graduate students as well as historians, including professionals and non-professionals. She added that "Kellar is best when he deals with the period of desegregation and not background information".

Amilcar Shabazz of the University of Alabama wrote that the book "is a useful case study of Houston and school desegregation." He argued that the book should have included socioeconomic structure theory in regard to the business community's handling of the desegregation issue, and that the book was in a "bind" by mentioning the resegregation in the Houston area schools and yet also championing the "success" of desegregation in Houston.

Raymond Wolters of the University of Delaware described the book as "a competent but narrowly focused" and "valuable account of the school board debates and demographic trends of Houston". Wolters argued that information on changes during desegregation, including academic achievement, changes in behavior, and curricula, would have improved the book.

== See also ==
Other books about African-Americans in Houston:

- Black Dixie
- Down in Houston
