= History of Koreans in Houston =

As of the 2010 U.S. Census there were 11,813 ethnic Koreans in Harris County, Texas, in the Houston area, making up 4.2% of the county's Asian population. In 2015 Haejin E. Koh, author of "Korean Americans in Houston: Building Bridges across Cultures and Generations," wrote in regards to the census figure that "community leaders believe the number is twice as large."

== History ==
In 1970 the official census figure for people of Korean origins in the entire state was 2,090. Bruce Glasrud, a historian, stated that the real figure may be higher as some previous Korean immigrants were counted as Japanese, as Korea was then under the Empire of Japan. Kristopher "Kris" Ahn, who immigrated to Houston in 1975, recalled that, at that time, there was one travel agency and grocery store each operated by ethnic Koreans in Houston and that a cohesive Korean ethnic community had not yet formed. Gigi Lee, another immigrant in that era, stated that her family went to a store owned by ethnic Japanese people to get ethnic Korean products, and that the ethnic Korean community at the time numbered about 500. Dr. Sam Jae Cho also stated that in the early 1980s that a Korean community had not yet solidified, and that a Korean church had a relatively small meeting area.

As of 1983 there were about 10,000 ethnic Korean people in Houston. In 1990 there were 6,571 ethnic Koreans, making up 6% of the county's Asian population. In 2000 this figure had increased to 8,764, making up 4.5% of the county's Asian population. The number of Koreans increased by 35% from 2000 to 2010. In 2008 the estimated number of ethnic Koreans, which were about 5% of all persons of Asian origin in the area, was about 15,000. The heads of area ethnic Korean organizations estimated that the population was around 30,000.

In 2018 older ethnic Koreans protested against plans to include North Korea in Olympic ceremonies.

== Geography ==
Spring Branch has a large ethnic Korean population, and therefore it houses multiple Korean businesses and institutions.

== Economy ==
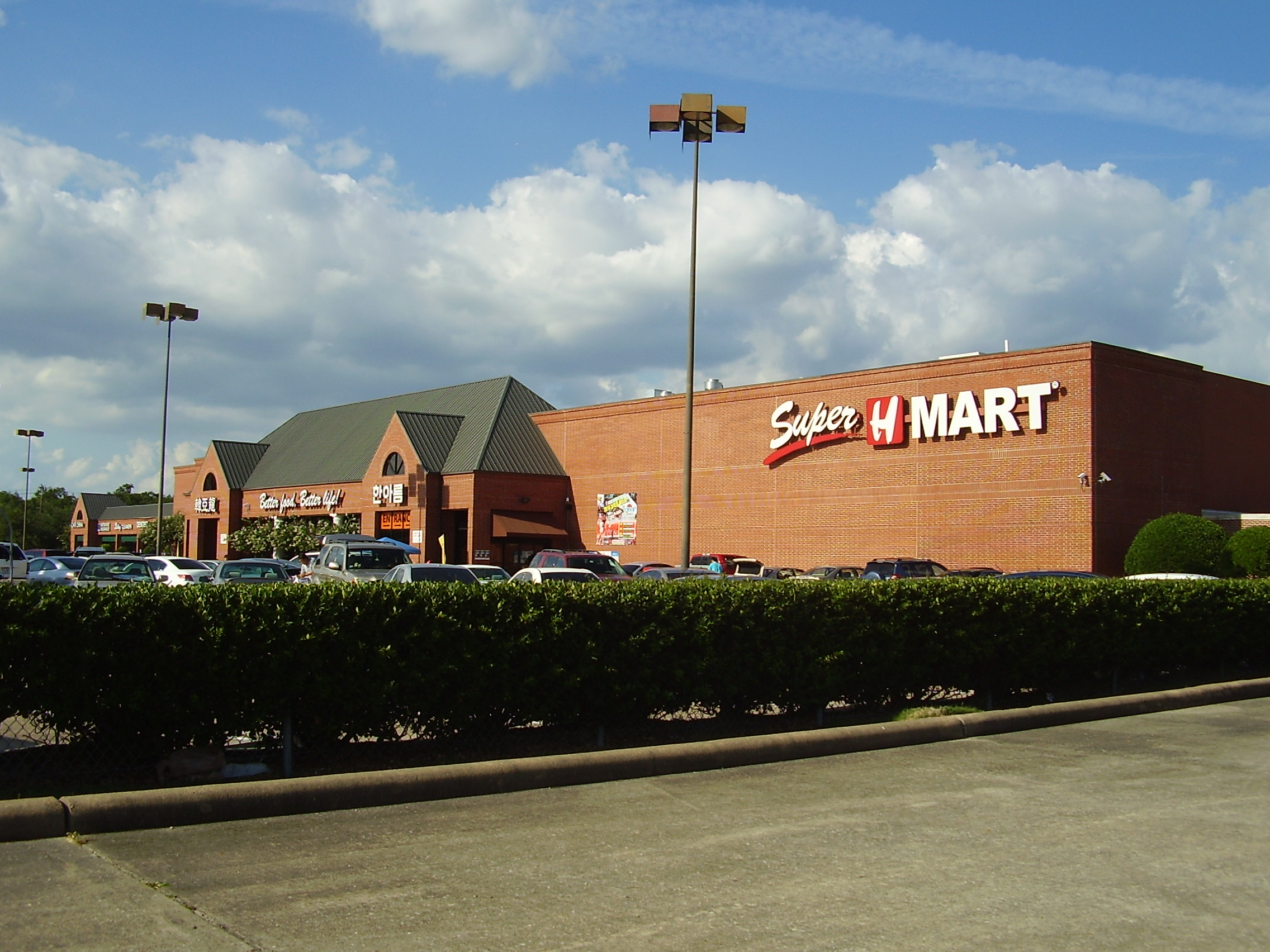
Super H Mart in Spring Branch, Houston, Texas

By 2008 a Super H Mart supermarket, a part of a Korean American chain, opened in Spring Branch. Purva Patel of the Houston Chronicle wrote that this supermarket attracted development to the area.

== Organizations and institutions ==
Circa 2011 there are about twenty ethnic Korean organizations in the Houston area. They include Korean American Society of Houston (KASH), the Korean American Association of Houston (KAAH), the Korean American Chamber of Commerce (KAAC), the Korean Student Associations (KSA) at the University of Houston (UH), and the Korean-American Energy Exploration and Production Society. The Korean-American Scientists and Engineers Association also maintains a chapter for South Texas.

The KAAH uses Korean as its primary medium on its website and in operations as most of its members are first generation immigrants. The predecessor of KASH, Korean American Young Professionals Association (KAYPA), was established in 1985 with John H. Kim (born 1959 in Austin, Texas) as the first president. The KAAC, established in 1974, originally was Korean-medium. Kris Ahn, who became the KACC president in 1995, perceived it and another organization as cannibalizing one another's purposes. Haejin Koh, wrote that "sustaining both organizations would be difficult and perhaps unnecessary." Kris Ahn made English the primary medium of the KAAC, and Haejin Koh wrote that "In 2006 the two organizations came to serve separate constituencies and flourished."

The Korean Community Center of Houston (KCCH), which occupies a 16,000-square-foot (1,500 m^{2}) two story building in Spring Branch formerly used for medical offices, held its formal opening ceremony on March 12, 2011. $500,000 was spent for acquisition and $900,000 for renovation, and the government of South Korea, the City of Houston, and ethnic fundraising provided money for this purpose. Prior to the opening of the center, a house in Spring Branch was used as a community center. The ethnic fundraising for such a center began around 1976 and in 2009 area Korean organizations made a drive to have the center established. The building was put up for sale after Hurricane Ike had damaged it. The storm damage increased the necessary costs of renovation. The Korean School, Seoul Baptist Church of Houston, local fundraising, ethnic Koreans in other countries, and seed money made up $100,000, $120,000, $200,000, $200,000, and $300,000, respectively. A U.S. Department of Housing and Urban Development grant worth $500,000 also supported the building. The Korean Cultural Center, the Korean School, and the KAAH offices are in the building.

Hyunja Norman created a political advocacy organization for Korean Americans, Woori Juntos, which was in existence by 2020. The name includes the Korean and Spanish names for the English word "we".

There is also a Korean Senior Center.

== Education ==
The Houston Korean School (휴스턴한인학교), located in the community center, provides supplementary Korean education. In 2011 it was the first and largest tenant in the community center, and it had 175 students that year. The Korean school previously held classes at a church. There the Houston Community College (HCC) also has a facility, where it holds English as a second language (ESL) classes. As of 2011 an after school program was planned.

As of 2011 about 200 students at HCC were South Korean citizens.

== Recreation ==
KASH organizes the Korean Festival (K-Fest), held every year at Discovery Green in Downtown Houston. It originated as the "Kimchi Fest", spearheaded by the KACC, in 2007. It received its current name in 2009 and expanded its scope. K-Fest includes K-Pop, Korean dance, Korean food, American-Korean fusion food, taekwondo, and other Korean cultural performances.

== Politics ==
In 2018 Harris County did not offer Korean translations of election ballots. The office of the Harris County Clerk chose not to allow volunteer Korean translators inside polling places, citing state law, although they were allowed in the parking lot.

In 2021 the Texas Legislature redrew U.S. House of Representatives boundaries so that the Korean community in Spring Branch was divided between two different districts, reducing their political representation.

== Religion ==
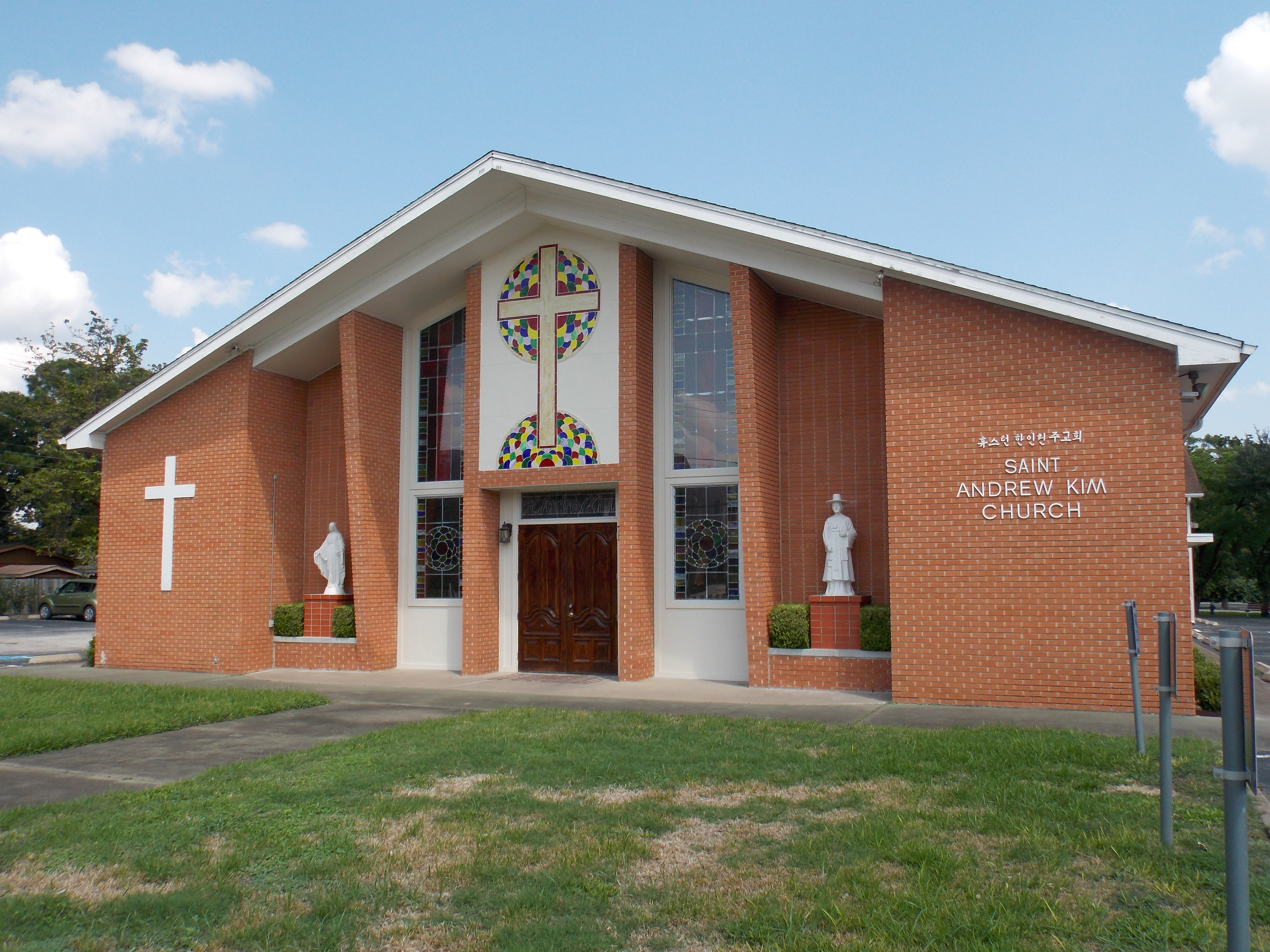
St. Andrew Kim Catholic Church (Korean: 휴스턴한인천주교회) in Spring Branch

As of 2008 the oldest ethnic Korean church is the Korean Christian Church of Houston. In September 2007 Chul Chung, the senior pastor, returned to South Korea after he resigned. In 2008 there was discord among factions in the church and around 100 people were expelled from the church. The members who were suspended or expelled instead attended services at the Korean Senior Center.

In 1999 the Houston area had over 1,000 Korean Catholics. The Korean Catholic church is St. Andrew Kim Catholic Church in Spring Branch, named after Andrew Kim Taegon. Seoul Baptist Church of Houston is an ethnic Baptist church in the area.

On December 25, 2001, the Korean Community Church in The Woodlands, with Presbyterian Korean-language services and non-denominational English services, opened. It opened to serve ethnic Koreans in The Woodlands, Conroe, Huntsville, Kingwood, and Spring.

== Transportation ==
In May 2014 Korean Air started a flight from Incheon International Airport near Seoul to George Bush Intercontinental Airport. The KACC supported this effort. The airline canceled the service in 2017, stating that there was not enough demand for the flight.
