= HHA =

HHA may refer to:

- HHA Services, an American service company
- Haji Husein Alireza & Co. Ltd., a Saudi Arabian trading company
- Hallische Händel-Ausgabe, a collection of the works of George Frideric Handel
- Hamburger Hochbahn, a transit operator in Hamburg, Germany
- Hans Henrik Andreasen, Danish footballer and manager with the nickname HHA
- Harrisburg Housing Authority, the operator of public housing in Harrisburg, Pennsylvania
- Herbert Henry Asquith, former Prime Minister of the United Kingdom
- Historic Hotels of America, an American hotel affiliation group
- Historic Houses Association, a British organisation that represents privately owned historic properties
- Hoboken Housing Authority, the operator of public housing in Hoboken, New Jersey
- Holyoke Housing Authority, the operator of public housing in Holyoke, Massachusetts
- Houston Housing Authority, the operator of public housing in Houston, Texas
