= Naomi Polk =

African American artist

Naomi Polk (1892 – May 1, 1984) was an American artist.

== Early life and family history ==
Naomi Polk (née Howard) was born in 1892 in Houston, Texas, to Woodson and Josephine (née Walton) Howard. She descended from Cherokees on her father's side and from enslaved people in the United States of African descent on her mother's side. She went to the Gregory School and the Booker T Washington School in Houston before dropping out to help raise her young cousins. She grew up in the Fourth Ward and in Acres Homes, then a suburb of Houston.

== Personal life ==
Polk married Bill Myers, with whom she had three children before he was killed in 1933 by a Dallas policeman.

== Career ==
Polk moved to Acres Homes, in the 1950s when it was still a suburb of Houston. Her lost her life's work of art and writing when her house there burned in 1961. She worked for many years attempting to recreate the paintings and poetry lost in the fire. She also painted a series of watercolors called Lonesome Road. She did not exhibit her art work during her lifetime.

== Death and legacy ==
Polk died in Houston on May 1, 1984.

Retrospective exhibitions of her work emerged after her death. Diverse Works and the Leslie Muth Gallery in Houston exhibited her work. The traveling exhibit "Handmade and Heartfelt: Folk Art in Texas" displayed her art in 1987. Her papers are archived at the Houston Metropolitan Research Center.
