= Christia Adair =

American activist and civil rights worker (1893–1989)

- Born: October 22, 1893; Victoria, Texas
- Died: December 31, 1989 (aged 96); Houston, Texas
- Education: Samuel Huston College; Prairie View State Normal and Industrial College
- Occupations: Teacher, Executive Secretary, Houston NAACP, Co-founder, Harris County Democrats
- Spouse: Elbert H. Adair (m. 1918; died 1943)
- Honours: Texas Women's Hall of Fame, 1984

Christia V. Daniels Adair (October 22, 1893 – December 31, 1989) was an African-American suffragist and civil rights worker based in Texas. There is a mural in Texas about her life, displayed in a county park which is named for her.

== Early life and education ==
Christia V. Daniels was born October 22, 1893, in Victoria, Texas, and grew up in Edna, Texas, the daughter of Ada Crosby Daniels, a laundress, and Hardy Daniels, who had a hauling business. She had an older half-sister whom her mother had legally adopted, and two younger brothers. Her early life was heavily influenced by her Christian religion, which she professed at 11, and her involvement with the Methodist Church. She attended Samuel Huston College, which her godfather co-founded and trained to teach at the Prairie View State Normal and Industrial College, graduating in 1915.

== Career ==
Christia Daniels taught at public schools in Edna for three years and then left teaching in 1918 after she married Elbert H. Adair, a brakeman for the Missouri-Pacific Railroad, and moved to Kingsville, Texas. Here, she joined a women's group and fought against gambling establishments and organized petition drives for women's suffrage. Despite the success of the women's suffrage movement, she was prevented from voting in Texas and turned away from a polling place due to state decreeing that black Americans could not vote in primaries, even though she was allowed to register to vote. This incident prompted Adair to begin working with the civil rights movement. Her work in the community increased when the trends of racial discrimination at the time became more prevalent.

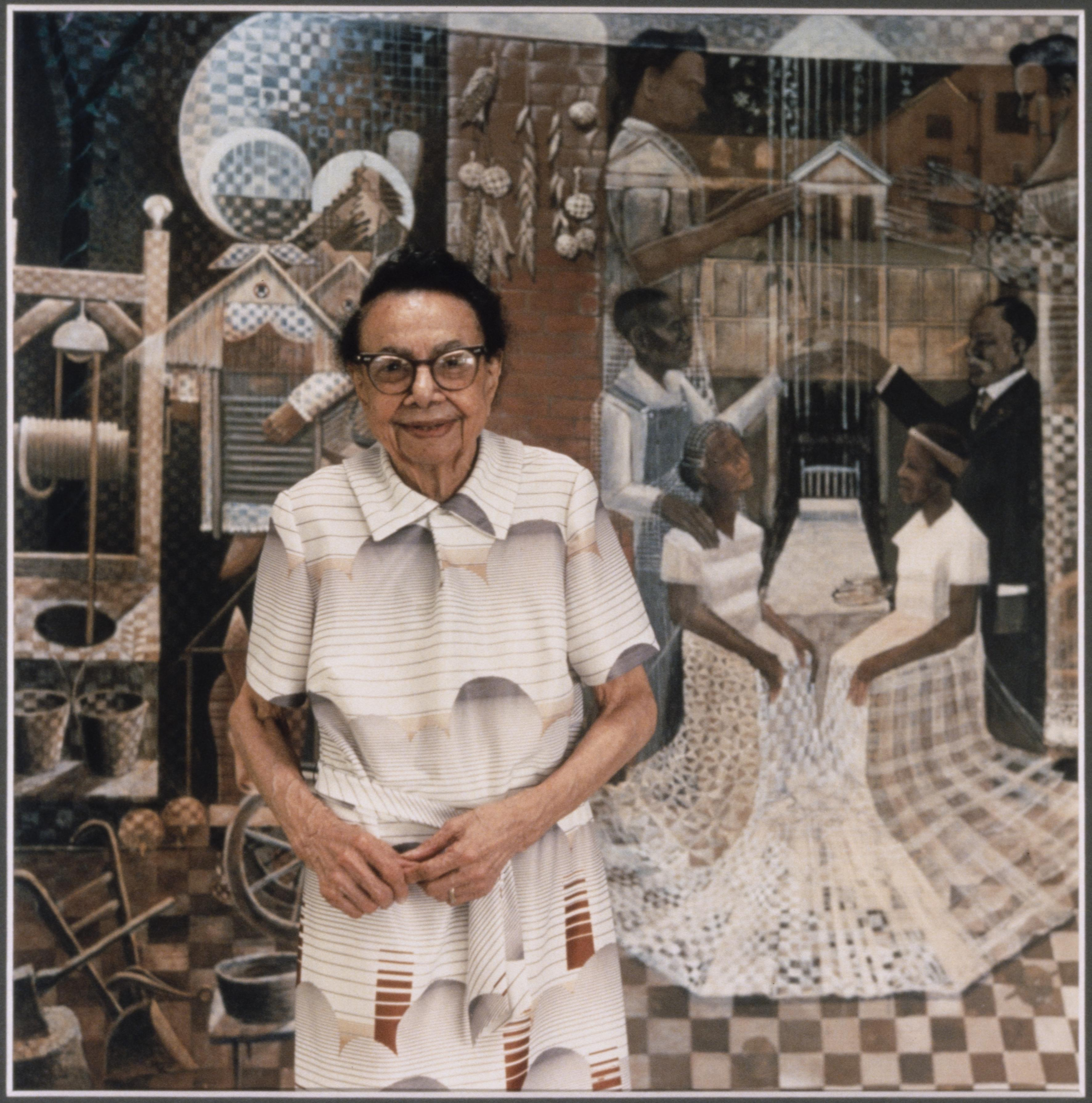

She moved to Houston in 1925, and joined the city's chapter of the NAACP in 1943. She served the chapter as executive secretary from 1949 or 1950 to 1959, through the period of the landmark Smith v. Allwright case. After the case was decided in favor of Smith, the Houston chapter of the NAACP became a popular target for bomb threats. She refused to divulge the group's membership rolls to police due to the belief that the Houston police were trying to procure the list in order to break up the chapter, under the guise of claims of barratry. She was one of the chapter members who testified during the trial regarding the attempted seizure of the chapter's records.

Adair worked on desegregation of the Houston Public Library, airport, hospital, and public transit facilities, as well as department store dressing rooms. She was part of the effort to make black Texans eligible to serve on juries, and to be hired for county jobs. Adair co-founded the Harris County Democrats, an integrated organization, and in 1966 was the first African-American woman elected to the state's Democratic Executive Committee (though she refused her seat on the committee in protest). She was also active in the Methodist Episcopal Church from childhood, and was the first woman on the denomination's general board.

Adair was honored during her lifetime, as the namesake of a county park and community center in Houston, which includes a John T. Biggers mural about her life; and in 1984 when she was inducted into the Texas Women's Hall of Fame. She also gave an interview in 1977 to the Black Women Oral History Project at Harvard's Schlesinger Library on the History of Women in America.

== Personal life and legacy ==
Christia Daniels was widowed in 1943 and died in 1989 at 96.

Her papers are archived in the collection of the Houston Public Library, within the African American Library at the Gregory School in the Fourth Ward.

== See also ==
- History of the African Americans in Houston
