= ABM Industries =

United States facility management provider

ABM Industries Inc.
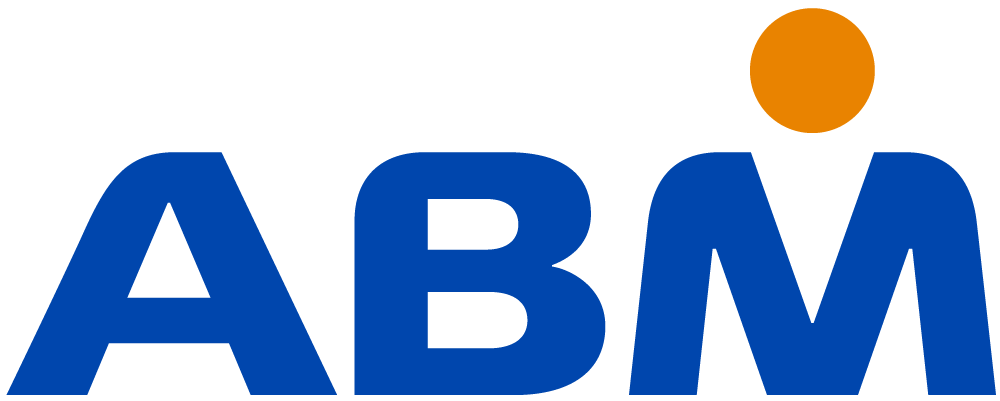
- Type: Public
- Traded as: NYSE: ABM; S&P 600 component
- Industry: Facility services
- Founded: 1909; 117 years ago
- Founder: Morris Rosenberg
- Headquarters: One Liberty Plaza, 7th FL, New York, NY 10006, U.S.
- Area served: United States, Canada, Puerto Rico, United Kingdom, Ireland
- Key people: Sudhakar Kesavan (chairman); Scott Salmirs (CEO & president); David Orr (CFO)
- Products: Integrated facility services
- Services: Electrical; Energy; Facilities Engineering; HVAC and Mechanical; Integrated Facility Solutions; Janitorial; Landscape and Grounds; Parking and Transportation
- Revenue: ▲US$8.7 billion (FY2025)
- Net income: ▲US$162 million (FY2025)
- Number of employees: 140,000 (2019)
- Website: ABM.com

ABM Industries Inc. is a American facility management provider in the United States founded in 1909 by Morris Rosenberg in San Francisco, California. ABM provides facility services in areas such as electrical, lighting, energy, facility engineering, electrification, heating, ventilation, air conditioning, mechanical, janitorial services, landscape, grounds, parking, and transportation.

== History ==
ABM was founded as a single-person window washing business. As of 2013, the company has over 130,000 employees, over 350 offices, and various international locations.

=== 1909–1944 ===
In 1909, Morris Rosenberg, the company's founder, began cleaning shopkeepers' windows in San Francisco, CA. The company took the name American Building Maintenance in 1913 and acquired Easterday Janitorial Supply Company in 1927.

In the 1920s and 1930s, ABM grew its business on the West Coast by offering annual cleaning contracts to businesses. In 1921, ABM became the first janitorial contractor in America to clean a major college campus after contracting to clean Stanford University.

When Rosenberg died in 1935, his oldest son, Theodore "Ted" Rosenberg, became president and his younger son Sydney joined the company in 1937. Ted purchased an electrical company in that same year and ABM cleaned Navy ships and installed wiring on Water Buffalo amphibious vehicles during World War II. By the end of the war, ABM had grown to 17 offices in the U.S. and Canada.

=== 1945–1999 ===
ABM's growth continued throughout the post-war years and the company went public in 1962 in the over-the-counter market with Ted serving as chairman and Sydney as CEO. Ted remained involved with ABM until his death in 2010 serving on the board of directors and the late Sydney retired as a director in December 1997.

In 1965, ABM went from the over-the-counter stock market, to being listed on the NYSE American. In the late 1960s, ABM acquired the companies later known as Ampco System Parking, CommAir Mechanical, Amtech Elevator Services and Amtech Lighting Services. In 1971, ABM made its debut on the New York Stock Exchange under the ticker symbol ABM. ABM Engineering was established in the early 1990s and received ISO 9002 certification in 1999. By the end of 1999, ABM employed over 55,000 people and reported annual sales revenue over $1.6 billion.

=== 2000–2015 ===
Henrik Slipsager became the president and chief executive officer of ABM Industries in November 2000. Divestitures were made, including selling Amtech Elevator in 2003 and CommAir Mechanical in 2005. ABM acquired Lakeside Building Maintenance in 2002; Security Services of America in 2004; and four janitorial companies—Colin Service Systems in the Northeast; Initial Cleaning Services' janitorial operations in Maryland; HGO in Philadelphia; and Brandywine Building Services in the Delaware, southeast Pennsylvania and south New Jersey area.

17 ABM employees were killed at the World Trade Center during the September 11 attacks. Among those killed was Roko Camaj who was on the 105th floor of the South Tower when it was struck by United Airlines Flight 175. He managed to call his wife, Katrina, but was unable to escape before the tower collapsed. Camaj has come to be known as the "patron saint of window washers". A window washer that was working for ABM managed to use his squeegee to open an elevator door, saving six people.

In 2007, ABM acquired the assets of HealthCare Parking Systems of America, Inc. (HPSA), a provider of healthcare-related parking services based in Tampa, Florida with annual revenues of approximately $26 million.

Also in 2007, ABM completed the acquisition of OneSource Services Inc. (London AIM: OSS) for $365 million in cash. OneSource is a provider of outsourced facility services, including janitorial, landscaping, general repair and maintenance, and other specialized services for more than 10,000 commercial, industrial, institutional and retail accounts in the U.S.

In 2010, ABM acquired The Linc Group, LLC, also known as TLG, for $300 million. Also in 2010, ABM acquired select parking assets from the L&R Group of Companies and also all of the assets of three parking companies: Five Star Parking, Network Parking Company Ltd., and System Parking, Inc.

In November 2012, ABM acquired Atlanta-based AirServ Corp. for $158 million in cash, it also acquired HHA Services, a food and facility service provider to hospitals, healthcare systems, long-term care facilities and retirement communities.

=== 2015 – present ===
In 2015, the company named Scott Salmirs as its 7th CEO in ABM's 106-year history.^{[34]} ABM also appointed Anthony Scaglione as CFO in April 2015.

ABM sold its security business to a division of Universal Services of America in October 2015 for $131 million. In June 2017, ABM sold its government services business to Valiant Integrated Services for $35 million.

ABM also acquired Westway Services Holdings, a technical engineering company for U.K. customers, in December 2015.^{[37]}

In June 2016, it was announced that ABM Industries had joined the Fortune 500 for the first time.^{[38]}

In September 2017, ABM Industries purchased GCA Services Group for $1.25 billion, the largest acquisition in the company's history.

In October 2021, ABM Industries finalized the acquisition of Able Services, which was headquartered in San Francisco. At the time of the acquisition, Able Services was the largest family owned facility services company in the United States.

When AMB was contracted to work in the Ann Arbor Public Schools in 2014, they ceased custodial recycling without explanation or notice to the community.

== See also ==
- List of S&P 600 companies
