= Historic Oaks of Allen Parkway Village =

Public housing development located in Houston, Texas, United States

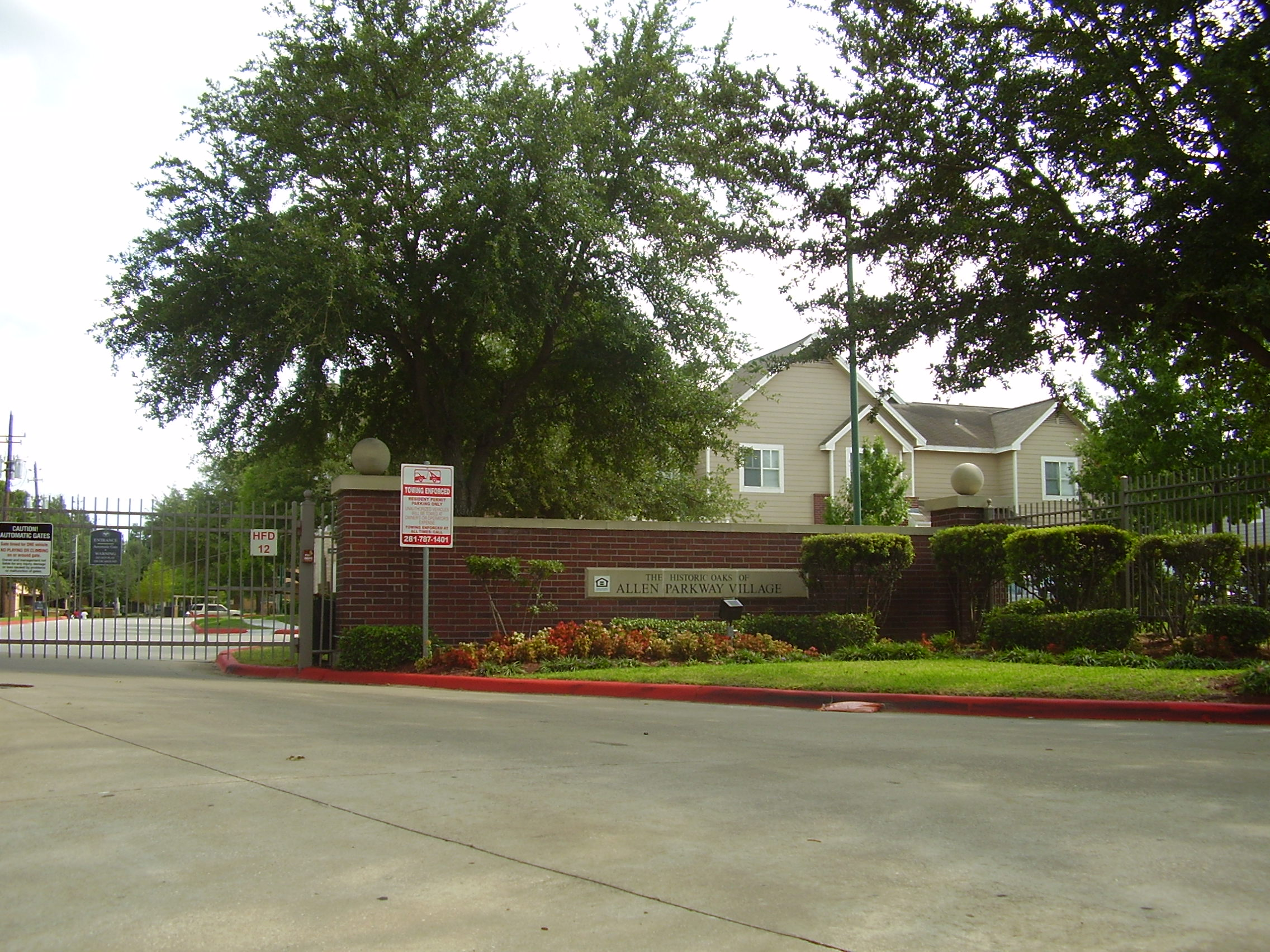
Historic Oaks of Allen Parkway Village

Historic Oaks of Allen Parkway Village, formerly Allen Parkway Village (APV) and San Felipe Courts Apartments, is a public housing complex in the northern Fourth Ward, Houston, Texas, operated by the Houston Housing Authority (HHA). Allen Parkway Village occupies 37 acres (15 ha) of land.

At one time the headquarters of the HHA, previously known as the Housing Authority of the City of Houston (HACH), were at APV. In 1988 it was the largest HACH facility.

== History ==
=== Opening and initial history ===
The construction of Allen Parkway Village, originally known as San Felipe Courts Apartments, was completed in 1944, with 963 units built. A group of architectural firms with MacKie & Kamrath being the leader completed the facility. As part of the development process, about 900 bodies were moved from the former New City Cemetery, a cemetery that was operated beginning in 1880 and ending in 1920, to Brookside Cemetery. However the effort missed around 355 bodies.

Allen Parkway Village, which was built over the site of a former red light district, "The Reservation", was designed to beautify Allen Parkway. It was originally reserved for White people. Mike Snyder of the Houston Chronicle said that local historians indicated the development of the complex as a factor that lead to the decline of the Fourth Ward. It was renamed "Allen Parkway Village" in 1964. In 1968 African-Americans were permitted to move to APV.

Circa 1976 most of the residents were African-Americans who wished to be near Downtown Houston and the Fourth Ward, and the occupancy rate was over 95%. Brian Wallstin of the Houston Press stated that at the time APV "was considered the best of the city's public housing complexes."

In December 1984 about 2,000 people lived in APV, which was almost 50% of the total number of people residing in HACH properties.

=== Demolition struggle ===
Starting in the 1970s the HACH wanted to demolish Allen Parkway Village while residents fought to have the entire structure remain. In 1977 Robert Wood, the director of the Housing Authority of the City of Houston, wrote a letter proposing that Allen Parkway Village be demolished. In 1979 the United States Department of Housing and Urban Development (HUD) authorized $10 million for modernizing APV, but HACH only spent below $50,000 for this purpose, and instead left around 500 units vacant. The city officials had proposed building other low income housing elsewhere in the city. Public housing officials and private developers were in favor of demolishing the housing, while preservationists and residents were in favor of keeping the housing. The private developers hoped to have higher income housing and commercial use. The HACH, during this time, moved its headquarters into a building in River Oaks. Jim Sherman of the Houston Press stated in 1993 that in addition to the practical desire for redevelopment, much of the impetus was a determination of the politically connected to get the complex demolished after initially running into roadblocks against the goal. Sherman stated that the population loss and decline of APV were "by design".

HACH officials asserted that the agency filed the first demolition permit in 1984. According to press reports, HACH had sent secret requests for razing the complex in 1977, which employees of the federal housing authority at the time disapproved of, and in 1981.

Beginning in the 1970s thousands of Vietnamese refugees moved to Allen Parkway Village, along with those from Cambodia. HACH had deliberately placed them there, according to Wallstin, "in an attempt to pave the political pitfalls to its then-secret demolition plans". A report prepared for HACH stated the agency's belief that the Asians would, compared to other racial groups, not put up as much resistance to agency moves to eliminate APV. The existence of the report was later revealed by lawyers representing ethnic Vietnamese clients. At APV Asians encountered crime and tensions with existing black residents. Some families doubled up, sharing the same apartment units.

The Handbook of Texas said "In the 1980s and 1990s the continued future of the Fourth Ward as a black community came under serious attack" due to plans to demolish Allen Parkway Village and replace the complex with housing for high income people and office buildings. In a Handbook of Texas entry the citizen opposition and "more importantly" the mid-1980s economic decline delayed those plans. The Handbook of Texas said that the neglect of the housing units and the resulting disappearance of those units, the reluctance of investors to invest capital into the Fourth Ward, and "future of the neighborhood" all "undermined" "[t]he viability" of the Fourth Ward. The HACH made a unanimous vote to demolish Allen Parkway Village. The official demolition permission application and sale request were made in 1984 and 1985, respectively.

However activist Lenwood Johnson began campaigning against the demolition of the complex. Former HACH spokesperson Esther De Ipolyi stated that the agency employees were surprised at the level of resistance they received towards their plans, and that such resistance was unprecedented in Houston. She described Johnson as "one lone ranger who essentially stopped the process." University of Houston sociology professor Bill Simon described Johnson as "The only person among the residents who had any legal standing" to bring a challenge to its demolition. Johnson went into conflict with two HACH executive directors, at first an African-American named Earl Phillips, and later with Joy Fitzgerald. Local filmmaker Christine Felton stated that she "was surprised at how personal the fight between Lenwood and Joy became."

Johnson first opposed an attempted eviction of 125 Southeast Asian families, who he said had been extorted by HACH employees, until 1986. HACH had filed another demolition petition in 1984, but Houston City Council withdrew it in 1989. Johnson pressured Mickey Leland, a Congressperson, into supporting an amendment that would prohibit HACH from funding APV's demolition with money from the federal government; Johnson stated that Leland initially balked at the request. In 1988 Allen Parkway Village was listed on the National Register of Historic Places. Johnson personally went to Washington, DC and met Henry Cisneros, the head of the U.S. Department of Housing and Urban Development (HUD). For a period Simon advised Johnson; Simon stated that Johnson "after a while was constantly tripping over his own ego." Wallstin stated that Johnson eventually became consumed with the fight as he wished to maintain his role as the savior of APV rather than maintaining residences for the disadvantaged, and that Johnson, "as even his supporters acknowledged, made the mistake of buying into his own shtick." By 1989 there were 130 families residing in the complex, a decline from the previous amount. Marvin Krislov of the Yale Law Journal noted that HUD had not at the time certified the removal of the housing property, but the population had declined anyway, reflecting how HACH was deliberately causing APV to deteriorate.

In August 1990 Felton began recording footage of events related to APV, including protests and meetings that were open to the public and conducted behind closed doors. She initially worked with Johnson, but the two had a conflict as Felton believed his group was trying to get creative control of her film. Simon stated that Felton's footage had major historical significance as she had recorded exclusive footage of key events, such as the meeting between Johnson and Cisneros.

The legal campaign reached the 5th U.S. Circuit Court of Appeals. In 1995 Allen Parkway Village's housing made up 24% of the public housing units in Houston. At the time, 21 of its apartments were occupied.

Cisneros was no longer the head of the oversight community of the HUD after the 1994 United States midterm elections, as people of the Republican Party occupied most of the Congressional seats from that point forward. This contributed to the settlement that resolved the Allen Parkway Village issue, at the cost of removing many of its units.

=== Resolution and aftermath ===
In 1996 Cisneros signed an agreement to allow the City of Houston to demolish 677 of the community's 963 units as long as the site was still used for low income housing. The older units were brick buildings, while David Ellison of the Houston Chronicle said that the newer units "look like any other apartments in Houston". The federal government spent $57 million in redeveloping Allen Parkway Village and improving the surrounding area. The remaining old units were placed on the National Register of Historic Places and were not demolished.

In 1998 the gravesites that were not discovered in the 1940s grave location were uncovered by excavation movements to create utility services for the new APV development. The HHA did not initially announce this to the public, and spokesperson Robert Reyna stated this was to keep the dignity of the deceased. After the discovery was disclosed, the HHA wished to move these bodies to Brookside while some area residents argued that the bodies should remain where they were. A prayer service for the bodies, reburied in the northeast corner of the facility, was held on March 26, 2001; the HHA moved them to another location to satisfy the demands of those residents wishing for the bodies to remain in their resting places while ensuring the APV project could be completed.

By 1999 remaining portions of APV were renamed to The Historic Oaks of Allen Parkway and had around 500 residential units. 16 residential buildings, a community center building, and an administrative building were retained. Of the 500 units 280 were existing units and 220 were newly constructed with $30 million federal funding. The first new group of tenants consisted of 156 low income elderly individuals. Allen Parkway Village lost none of its land area. David Ellison of the Houston Chronicle argued that the quest to preserve Allen Parkway Village was "quixotic." Johnson said "The myth is that the people of Allen Parkway Village lost after a 15- or 20-year fight. That's not true. Would you believe they didn't get one inch of Allen Parkway soil?" In 2000 the Houston Press ranked the opening of the new units as the "Best Event That No One Thought Would Ever Happen."

In November 2010 members of the Gregory Library Watch, a group started in January 2010, accused the Gregory African-American Library in the Fourth Ward of deliberately not archiving certain historical documents. Johnson, who became a member of the organization, stated that the library refused to archive documents about an effort to prevent the closing of the Allen Parkway Village, and Timothy O'Brien, another member of the group, said "They don't want to hear the low-income black history because it indicts the African-American politicians." O'Brien had written articles about the APV redevelopment controversy while he was a master's degree student.

== Education ==
Area students attend schools in the Houston Independent School District, including Gregory-Lincoln Education Center for K-8 and Heights High School (formerly Reagan High School).

Prior to 1980, Gregory Elementary School (now used as the African American Library at the Gregory School) was a K-8 school separate from what was initially Lincoln Junior-Senior High School, and children living in the complex attended both schools. The latter was later simply Lincoln Junior High School. In a period before 1980, there were approximately 175 APV residents who were students at Lincoln and about 512 who were students at Gregory; about 37.6% of the Gregory School students were APV residents. Around that period some residents attended Reagan, Yates, and other high schools. Gregory School was consolidated into Lincoln School in 1980.

== Healthcare ==
The Harris County Hospital District Jeff Davis Hospital was adjacent to APV. As of 2019 Ben Taub Hospital in the Texas Medical Center is the nearest public hospital.
