= Kelly Village (Houston) =

Public housing project located in Houston, Texas, United States

Kelly Village also known as "Kelly Court," is a 500-unit public housing projects located in the historic Fifth Ward neighborhood of Houston. It is a part of the Houston Housing Authority.

It is Houston's second housing project built for African Americans, opening after World War II. In the 1950s 80% of Kelly Court where low income black families, many descended from rural areas in Louisiana and Mississippi. By the 1970s many buildings where severely run-down and overran by drug dealers, pimps and criminals. Violent crimes such as robberies and assaults in Kelly court hit an all-time high in the early 1980s forcing police to set a curfew. Although the curfew was successful drugs still remained a problem in the project. In 1997 Kelly Court undergone several renovations and a full modernization which was completed by 1999. After modernization it was named Kelly Village and now open to mixed income families. In 2012 HUD granted a quarter-million dollar to Kelly Court for security renovation. The renovation installed surveillance cameras for law enforcement to reduce crime activity. In June 2013 the Housing Authority demolished the last original 63 units which were damaged by Hurricane Ike.

== Education ==
Residents are in the Houston Independent School District, and are zoned to Bruce Elementary School, Fleming Middle School, and Wheatley High School.

Kelly Village was previously zoned to E.O. Smith Education Center's middle school. By Spring 2011 Atherton and E.O. Smith were to be consolidated.
