= Edgar M. Gregory =

American Union Army officer (1804-1871)

Edgar Mantlebert Gregory
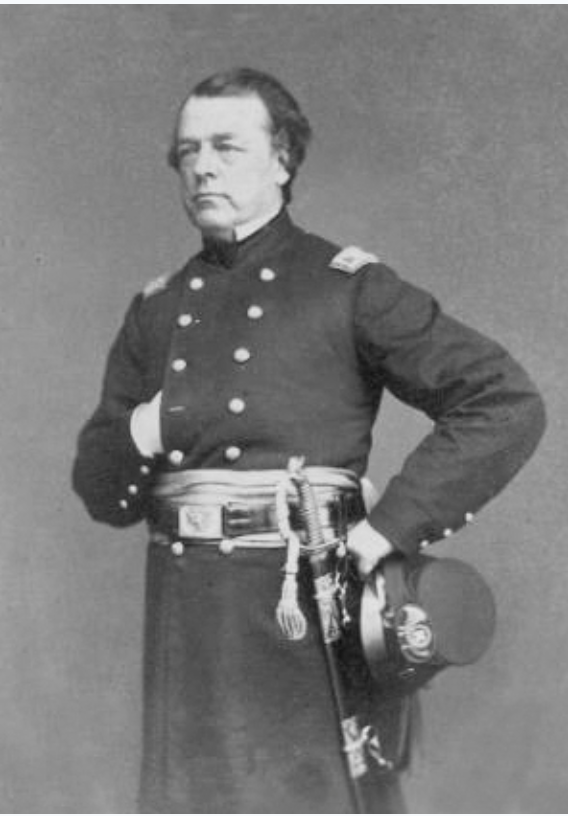
- Edgar M. Gregory during the American Civil War
- Born: January 1, 1804; Sand Lake, New York, U.S.
- Died: November 7, 1871 (aged 67); Philadelphia, Pennsylvania, U.S.
- Burial place: Laurel Hill Cemetery, Philadelphia
- Military career
- Allegiance: United States (Union)
- Branch: Union Army
- Service years: 1861–1867
- Rank: Colonel; Brevet Major General
- Commands: 91st Pennsylvania Infantry Regiment; 2nd Brigade, 1st Division, V Corps; Assistant Commissioner, Freedmen's Bureau Texas; Assistant Commissioner, Freedmen's Bureau Maryland
- Conflicts: American Civil War: Battle of Antietam; Battle of Fredericksburg; Battle of Chancellorsville; Battle of Gettysburg; Bristoe Campaign; Mine Run Campaign; Overland Campaign; Battle of Cold Harbor; Siege of Petersburg; Battle of Globe Tavern; Battle of Peebles' Farm; Appomattox Campaign; Battle of Five Forks; Battle of Appomattox Court House
- Other work: U.S. Marshal, businessman, pastor

Edgar Mantlebert Gregory (January 1, 1804 – November 7, 1871) was a Union Army officer during the American Civil War, Freedmen's Bureau official, and abolitionist. Prior to the war, he worked in lumber, banking, and railroad businesses in Cincinnati, where he also helped people escape slavery. During the war he rose to the rank of Brevet major general for his "gallant and distinguished service".

At the close of the war, he was made assistant commissioner of the Freedmen's Bureau responsible in the state of Texas. Planters and others, concerned about the cotton crops, continued to treat blacks as slaves with harsh, cruel treatment and forcing them to remain in Texas. Gregory, a firm abolitionist, recommended the use of labor contracts to set the terms of employment and payment for rendered services. He was promoted to inspector general and left his position due to whites, like David Burnet, who found him too concerned about the rights of African Americans. He was appointed to the position of United States Marshal for the Eastern District of Pennsylvania in May 1869 by Ulysses S. Grant and was in service when he died.

== Early life ==
Edgar Mantlebert Gregory was born on January 1, 1804, at the town of Sand Lake, New York in Rensselaer County, New York and grew up in Pennsylvania. His father was Rev. Justus or Julius Gregory and his mother was Clarissa Downs, the daughter of David and Sarah Downs. The Gregorys descended from pioneers of Norwalk, Connecticut and before that ancestors from Nottingham, England.

He had brothers Henry M. and David as well as older sisters. He lived in Deposit, New York.

== Pre-war career ==
Gregory lived for a number of years in Deposit, New York. In 1832, he and his partners established the Deposit Bridge Company. He then moved to Cincinnati, Ohio and was in the railroad, lumber, and banking businesses. He helped former slaves in their flight to Canada. By 1844, he was the treasurer on the executive committee of the American Home Missionary Society. He was the president of the Cincinnati Young Men's Auxiliary of the American Bible Society in 1846. He moved to Philadelphia, Pennsylvania, where he was a preacher. He established the Home Guards, local militia, in Philadelphia.

== Civil War ==
Gregory was a solemn, serious man, but he always spoke to us in kind, gentle tones, and we all liked him. He was a fighter in battle, but in camp he used to have prayer meetings and all that sort of thing, and I am afraid that the wicked boys about division headquarters used to make ribald and sometimes blasphemous comments on "Parson Gregory", whom, despite his kindness to us, we used to call with great irreverence the "Bible-banging Brigadier!"

— Story of a Cannoneer

During the American Civil War, Gregory was a Union Army officer. Two sons also enlisted in the army and both served until the end of the war. On August 2, 1861, Gregory joined the Union Army and was made colonel of the 91st Pennsylvania Infantry Regiment. The regiment fought in 21 battles. Gregory was wounded in the leg on March 3, 1863, at Chancellorsville, Virginia. He and his troops were attacked at Little Round Top at the Battle of Gettysburg. He led during the Richmond campaign (Second Battle of Deep Bottom and/or Operations against the Weldon Railroad) in August 1864. He was brevetted brigadier general on September 30 or October 17, 1864 at the Battle of Poplar Springs Church for "gallant and distinguished service."

Gregory and his regiment were present at the Battle of Appomattox Court House and the resulting surrender of the Army of Northern Virginia. There he took command of the Second Brigade, New York Volunteers, 1st Division, 5th Corps. On June 23, 1865, during the conclusion of the American Civil War, Gregory issued a general order: "People of color . . . the same personal liberty that other citizens and inhabitants enjoy." The order was endorsed by General Oliver Otis Howard.

His regiment mustered out in July 1865. He was brevetted major general on August 9, 1865 or August 9, 1866, for "gallant conduct" at the Battle of Five Forks. He was mustered out by the Secretary of War on November 30, 1867.

== Freedmen's Bureau ==
=== Background ===
General Gordon Granger issued a proclamation in Texas that slavery had come to an end, but that the "freed are advised to remain at their present homes, and work for wages." In Washington County, an Army official advised African Americans not to take a day or two to celebrate their freedom. Blacks in Texas faced violence by gangs of white gunmen or desperadoes if they tried to leave the state or to prevent them from leaving. There were also blacks were forcibly taken to Texas to work the crops, and there were committees that were formed to prevent blacks from returning to their families in other states. Other African Americans stayed in Texas on the promise of cotton plantation owners that they would be paid a share of the crop at the end of the year. Freed people were also kidnapped to be sold in slave countries Brazil or Cuba.

=== Texas ===
Gregory's greatest sin was trying to make the ex-slave free in fact, not just on paper.

— William L. Richter, author of The Army and the Negro During Texas Reconstruction, 1865-1870

He was appointed to a position with the Freemen's Bureau after the war. He was made assistant commissioner responsible for the state of Texas. In September 1865, he took over operation of the Galveston custom house. A staunch abolitionist, and due to the state being in "great peril" he was chosen for his fearlessness. He toured plantations in eastern Texas to assess the treatment of blacks. He found that blacks were treated the same as they had been under slavery. He found incidents "ranging from downright murder, savage beatings, merciless whippings, hunting men with bloodhound, through all the lesser degrees of cruelly and crime." He was the only assistant commissioner in Texas who was a radical abolitionist and many whites were angry about his proclivities towards blacks, who Gregory saw as respectable people, with good morals, and deserved the right to live free. He also saw himself as superior to African Americans.

Gregory spoke to white and black people about post-war emancipation, which white Texans thought arbitrary and unlawful, and reconstruction in the evenings, after the end of the work day. He and another assistant commissioner stated that African Americans "must show by their industry and perseverance that they were worthy of freedom." They dispelled rumors by stating that blacks would not receive land from slaveholders or the government to work their own farms. He handed out sample labor contracts to black and white people.

He managed the labor problem by establishing labor contracts between freedmen and their former slave owners, including making the contract a lien on the crops worked by the freedmen, and he appointed local agents to manage disagreements. He oversaw labor contracts, relief work, and relevant litigation. He had Army troops patrol near plantations and enforce the contractual agreements.

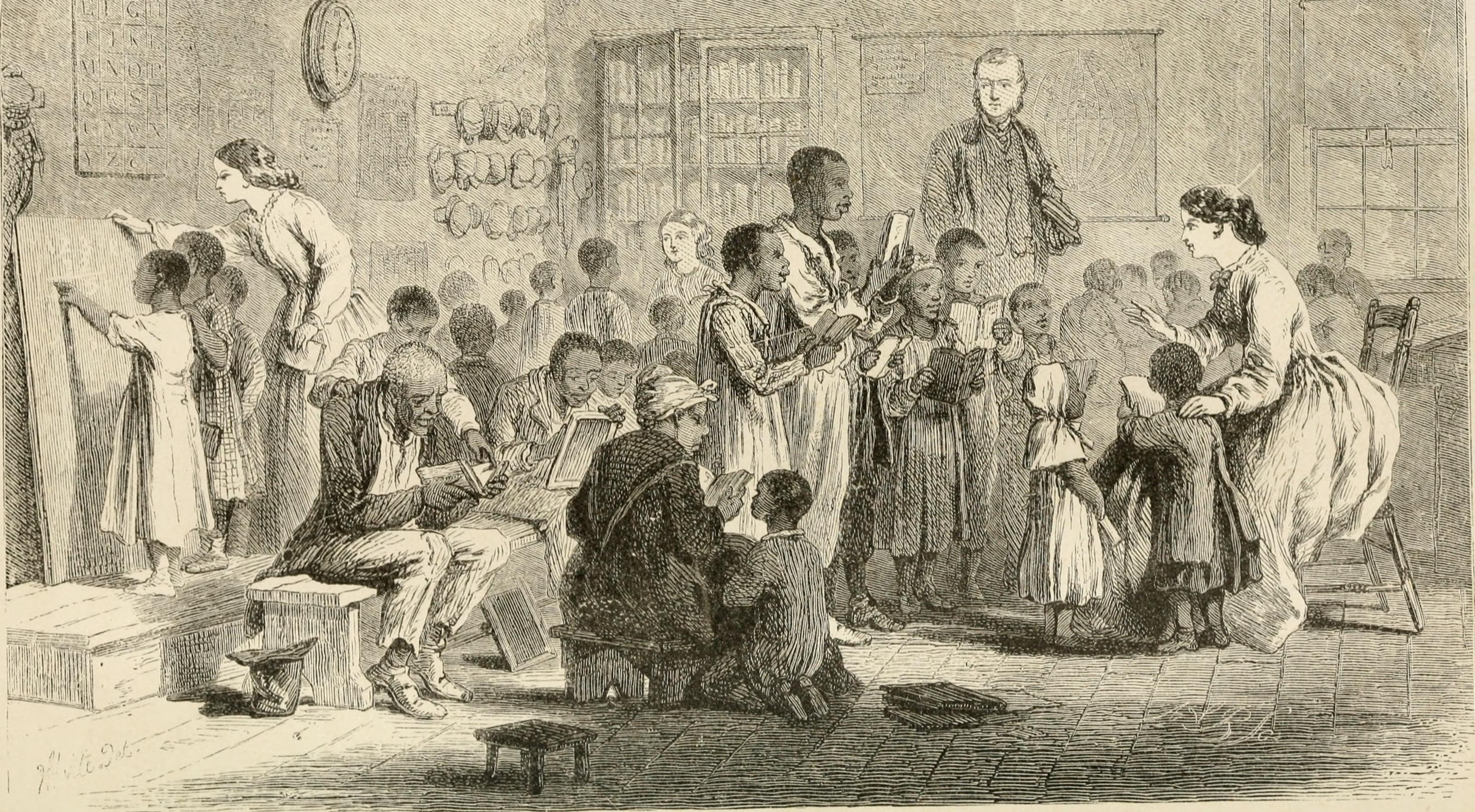
John Townsend Trowbridge, Picture of the desolated states; and the work of restoration. 1865-1868, 1868. An image that portrays establishing educational opportunities in the Reconstruction era

He oversaw the construction of numerous schools and churches. Gregory was removed from his position in January 1866, based upon attacks by David G. Burnet that Gregory was inciting anger of the freedmen for their employers. Gregory received a commendation for his service, was promoted to inspector general, after which he left his position on April 13, 1866. Major General Joseph Kiddoo, who "conducts matters on the white man principal", replaced Gregory.

=== Maryland ===
He was the commissioner of Maryland in 1867, the year in which illegal apprentices, where children were bonded to previous masters, were coming to an end. Apprenticeship arrangements made it difficult to enforce civil rights and emancipation for bonded children. It also made it difficult to ensure that black children were obtaining an education; former masters wanted the children in the fields. It was estimated that as many as 10,000 children were held under apprenticeships between 1864 and 1867. Under Gregory's leadership, apprenticeship was effectively destroyed in Maryland by 1868. The Bureau provided funding for construction and repair of buildings for schools, as well as educational materials, for black children. Teachers were provided by religious and civic organizations.

== Marshal ==
President Ulysses S. Grant appointed Gregory to the position of United States Marshal for the Eastern District of Pennsylvania on May 11, 1869.

== Personal life ==
Gregory married Ellen Young, daughter of Henry Young of Deposit, New York. Ellen was born on March 4, likely in 1807. She died on November 25, 1868. Their children are: Frances Henry (born 1828 or 1829), Justus Abram, and Sarah Augustus (born 1834 in Deposit, New York, died in 1890).

He was a member of the Republican County and a Mason. He was a Presbyterian. His health weakened due to the leg injury he sustained during the Civil War. He died at 68 years of age on November 7, 1871. A private funeral was held November 13, 1871 at his home in Philadelphia and with a military escort, that also included men who served under Gregory, of his hearse to the Oxford Presbyterian Church. Elements from President Abraham Lincoln's view at Independence Hall were used for Gregory's public service in the church. His funeral was attended by a number of clergy, judges, and military and former military. He and his wife were buried at the South Laurel Hill Cemetery.

== Legacy ==
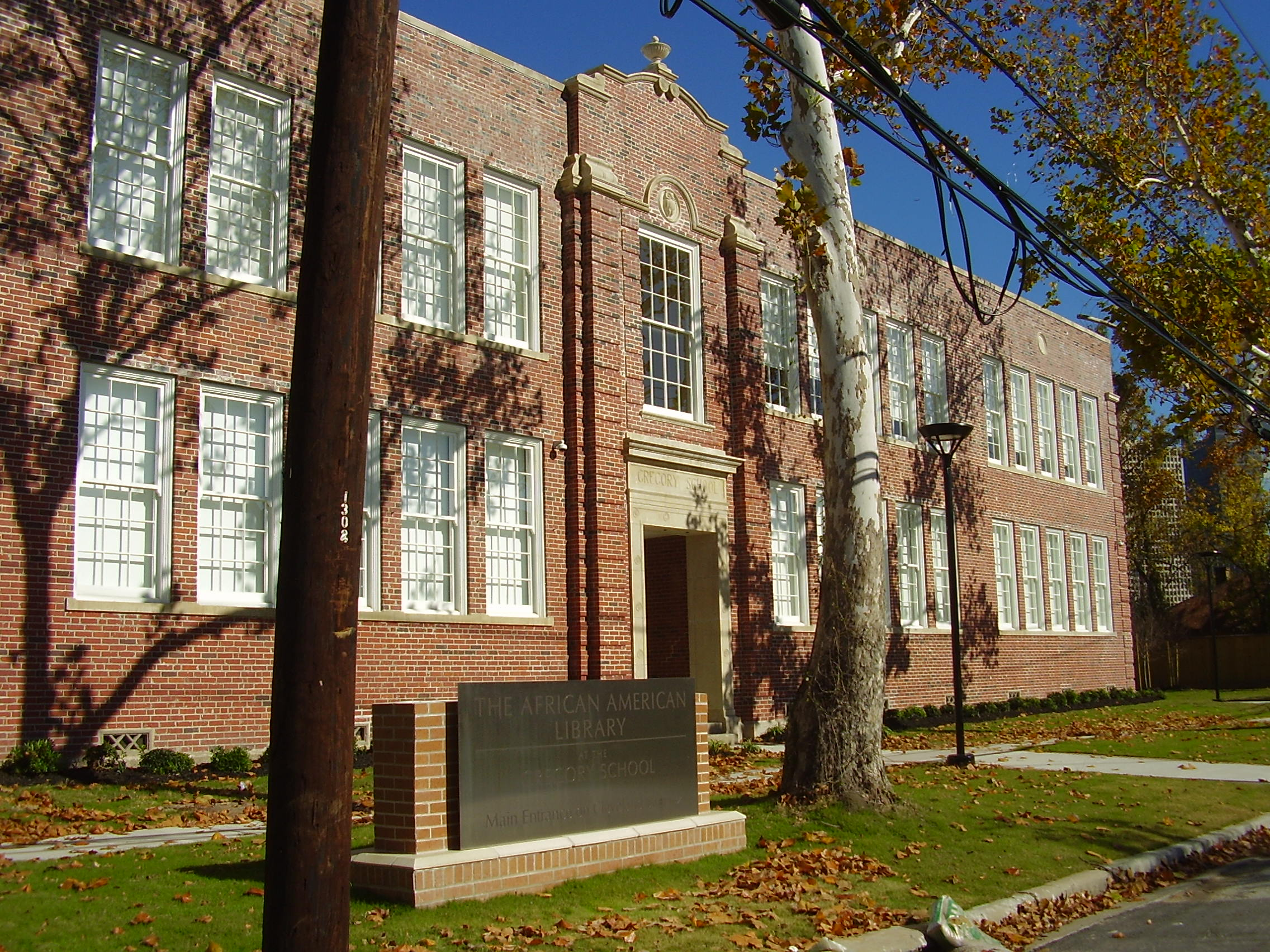
The former Edgar M. Gregory School, now the African American Library at the Gregory School

Named for him, Edgar M. Gregory School, is the first school for African American children in Houston. It is now the African American Library at the Gregory School, one of the few black libraries. It is located in the Freedmen's Town National Historic District in the Fourth Ward, Houston.

== See also ==
- List of American Civil War brevet generals (Union)
