= Lenwood Johnson =

American activist (died 2018)

Lenwood E. Johnson (died May 2018) was an activist who fought for public housing and African-American rights in Houston, Texas. He campaigned to prevent the demolition of Allen Parkway Village (APV), a public housing complex in the Fourth Ward, managed by the Housing Authority of the City of Houston (HACH), now known as Houston Housing Authority (HHA). By the 2010s he became an activist seeking to preserve the history of the Fourth Ward itself.

In 1995 Brian Wallstin of the Houston Press wrote that "For better or worse, whether heroic or just stubbornly obstructionist, the 15-year standoff between a single black man and powerful real-estate developers -- and the government bureaucrats who, as well, long for the coveted land on which APV sits -- will likely be remembered as legendary."

== Early life ==
Johnson originated from a rural area near Brenham, where his father worked as a sharecropper, and graduated from Pickard High School. He intended to go to St. Mary's College in San Antonio but instead majored in physics at Prairie View A&M University when his family lost their land value because of flooding and drought. Johnson attended for three years but dropped out because he was fired from a work-study program for protesting its conditions and therefore could no longer afford to attend.

He moved to Houston in the 1970s, and worked as a research technician in a laboratory. Johnson became a single parent after he and his wife divorced. He had developed illnesses in the course of his work, and was no longer able to work as a research technician. He had little money as he, along with his son, moved to APV in 1980.

== Activism ==
From the beginning, into the 1990s Johnson campaigned to prevent the complex from being sold to developers. In 1983, residents voted him into being the head of the APV Village Council, and he stated his opposition to political and business leaders seeking to raze APV. A former spokesperson for the HACH, Esther De Ipolyi, stated that the agency was surprised about the resistance it was facing against the demolition, and that "Lenwood's very effective. He's one lone ranger who essentially stopped the process." University of Houston sociology professor Bill Simon described Johnson as "The only person among the residents who had any legal standing" to bring a challenge to its demolition. Johnson went into conflict with two HACH heads, Earl Phillips, and Joy Fitzgerald; local filmmaker Christine Felton stated that she "was surprised at how personal the fight between Lenwood and Joy became." Johnson personally went to Washington, DC and met Henry Cisneros, the head of the U.S. Department of Housing and Urban Development (HUD). He used donated supplies and equipment during his activism work, and sometimes relied on bartering and donations from supporters.

Led by Johnson, the APV Resident Council worked with UH Urban Sociologist Dr. Nia Becnel to design the APV Community Campus Concepts to make public housing sustainable (www.campusplan.org). This team passed these national innovations as federal legislation through Congress under the HOPE VI HUD reforms, where HUD Secretary Cisneros and Congresswoman Sheila Jackson Lee co-signed with Johnson on the APV Guiding Principles in May of 1994. However, the democratically elected tenant council under Johnson became overrun by competing interests at HACH to appease city and corporate developers.

For a period Simon advised Johnson; Simon stated that Johnson "after a while was constantly tripping over his own ego." Brian Wallstin of the Houston Press stated that Johnson eventually became consumed with the fight as he wished to maintain his role as the savior of APV rather than maintaining residences for the disadvantaged, and that Johnson, "as even his supporters acknowledged, made the mistake of buying into his own shtick." Felton, who was creating a documentary about the APV battle, worked with Johnson, but the two had a conflict as Felton believed his group was trying to get creative control of her film.

Beginning in 1996, Allen Parkway Village was redeveloped in a way that reduced its capacity. As a result, Johnson moved to Irvington Village, an HACH complex in Northside. By 2001 the HHA was trying to evict him, stating he owed $4,000 for the operation of utilities. In 2001, after the HHA agreed to provide a moving service, Johnson agreed to vacate. He later moved into a rental unit operated by a private party. Johnson still appealed against his eviction, but the HACH board affirmed it on January 14, 2002.

After the end of the APV conflict, Johnson sought to preserve the bricks used on the roads of the Fourth Ward, which had been made by newly freed slaves, as well as the Fourth Ward in general. In November 2010 members of the Gregory Library Watch, a group started in January 2010, accused the Gregory African-American Library in the Fourth Ward of deliberately not archiving certain historical documents. Lenwood Johnson, now a member of the organization, stated that the library refused to archive documents about an effort to prevent the closing of the Allen Parkway Village. Johnson worked with activist Timothy O'Brien in his efforts to preserve the Fourth Ward. Johnson also criticized Mayor of Houston Annise Parker for seeking to preserve the original Rufus Cage Elementary School in the Eastwood while not doing enough to preserve the Fourth Ward.

== Death ==
From September 2017 to the end of his life, Johnson lived with a friend. Johnson developed respiratory problems and, when experiencing breathing issues, was taken to St. Joseph Medical Center in Downtown Houston on the evening of May 10, 2018. He died that month, at age 75. His funeral was to be held in Brenham.

== See also ==
- African-Americans in Houston
