= African American History Research Center =

Branch of the Houston Public Library in Texas, US

African American Library at the Gregory School
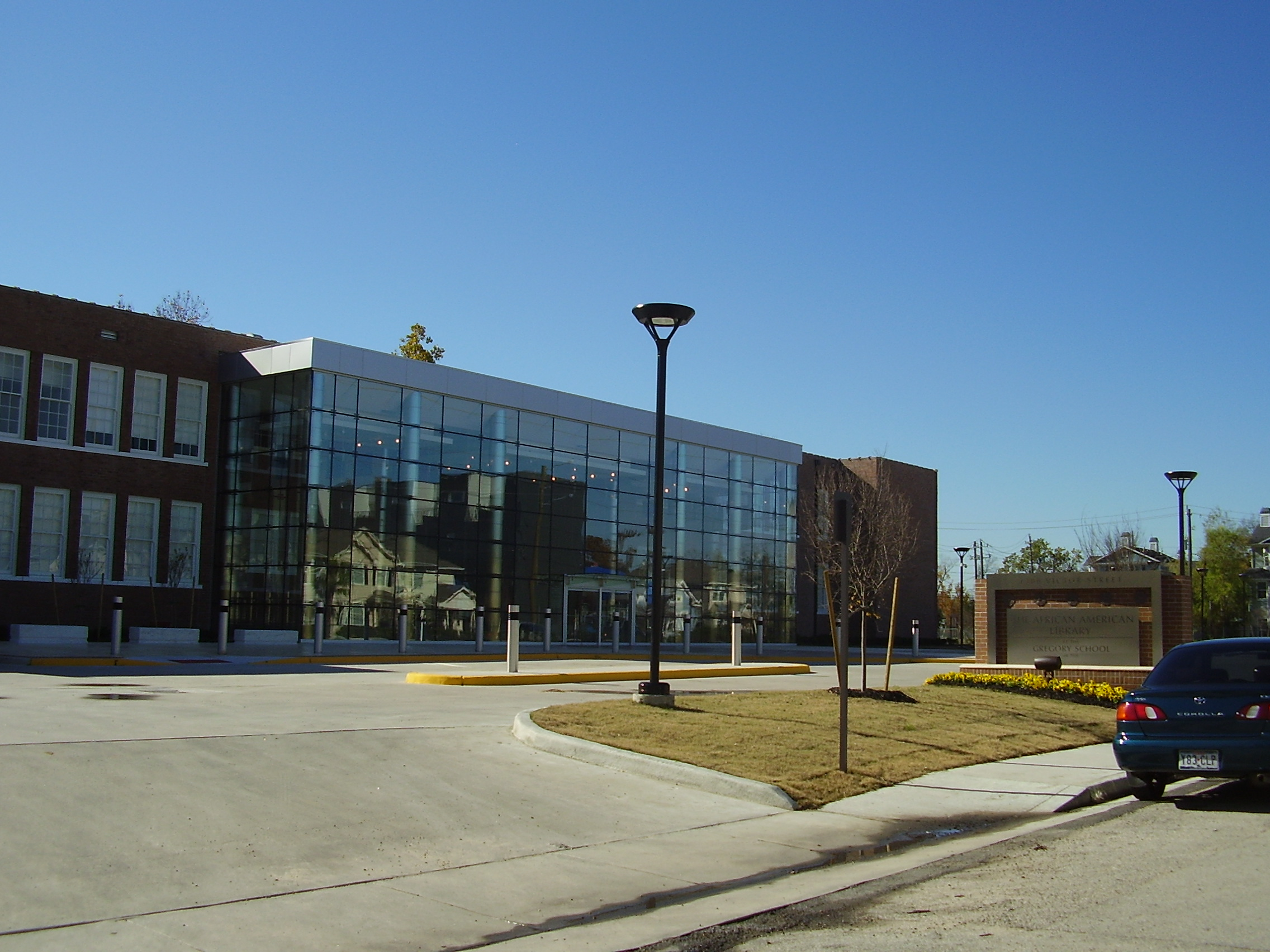
- African American Library at the Gregory School
- 29.754254454462064°N 95.38009117748142°W
- Location: Houston, Texas, United States

The African American History Research Center is a branch of the Houston Public Library (HPL) in the Fourth Ward, Houston. It was known as the African American Library at the Gregory School until 2022. The library preserves historical information about the African American community in Houston and the surrounding regions. It is the city's first library to focus on African American history and culture. The library features galleries, an oral history recording room, and reading rooms. $11 million from federal community development block grants and construction funds from Houston Public Library and the City of Houston financed the renovation of the Gregory facility. The building was initially used as the Edgar M. Gregory School, a K-8 school of the Houston Independent School District (HISD). The library was renamed to the African American History Research Center in the fall 2022.

== History ==
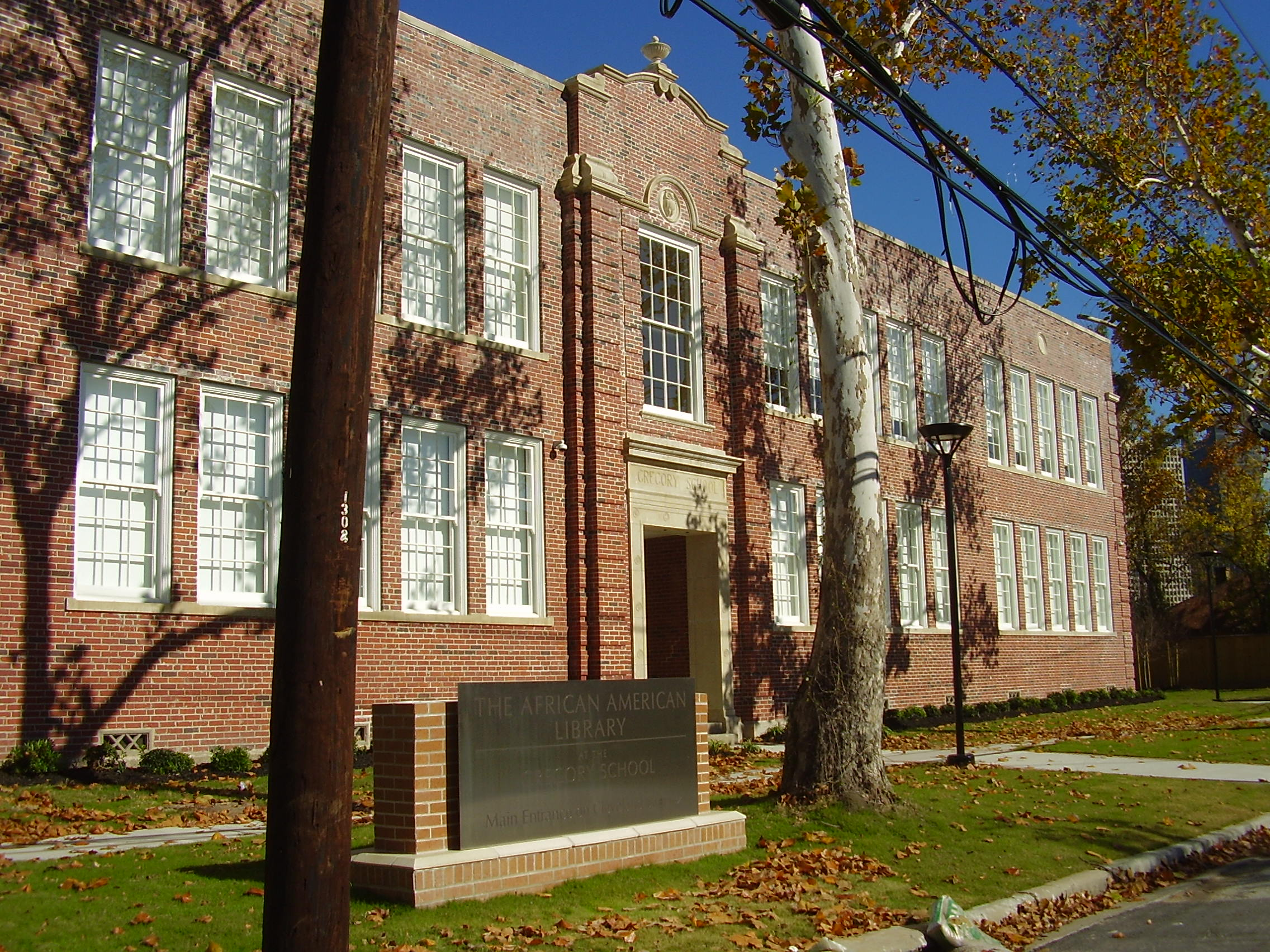
The library occupies the former Gregory School

The Freedmen's Bureau opened schools for children in the area after the establishment of Freedmen's Town. The Texas Legislature authorized the creation of public schools for Freedmen's Town by 1870. By 1872 most of the students and teachers who were at the bureau schools, which were closing, left them to attend the state-managed Gregory Institute, named after Edgar M. Gregory, an officer in the Union army in the U.S. Civil War and the assistant commissioner of the Texas area's Freedmen's Bureau. The school, which first opened in 1872, was the first school for freed people in Houston. Mike Snyder of the Houston Chronicle said that it was "perhaps" the first school for freed people in the State of Texas. By 1876 the school became a part of the Houston public school system. A document quoted in a U.S. Congressional report stated that as it was first established on land that was a donation from African-Americans, "Gregory Elementary had a special link to black life in the neighborhood."

In its history the Gregory School occupied three different buildings: the first two were a brick building and a wood-frame building with two stories; the second was ruined by a fire, prompting the construction of the third, named Edgar M. Gregory School, a 20,000-square-foot (1,900 m^{2}) facility opening in 1926, made of white brick.

Circa the 1920s the school was adjacent to the lake, and the area often flooded, with students and staff needing to pass through watery corridors. The presence of water allowed for various diseases to afflict both parties, and a Houston Informer story stated that "More teachers have died out of Gregory School than any public school in Houston."

In the period before its closure, it was a K-8 school separate from what was initially Lincoln Junior-Senior High School. It was one of two schools enrolling zoned residents of the Housing Authority of the City of Houston or HACH (now Houston Housing Authority) public housing complex Allen Parkway Village. In the 1979–1980 school year, the school had 882 elementary students, with 553 (62.7%) being black, 184 (20.9%) being Hispanic, 137 (15.5%) being Asian, and eight (0.9%) being white. In a period before 1980, there were approximately 512 APV residents who were students at Gregory, making up about 37.6% of the total school enrollment.

In 1980 the Gregory School merged with Abraham Lincoln Junior High School, now Gregory-Lincoln Education Center. The building was vacant from 1980 until its re-purposing as a library. When it was vacant, it had broken windows, a leaky roof that allowed rain to pour into the facility, and pigeons living in there.

Ultimately the facility was re-purposed as a research library. Renovation of the Gregory School began in 2008. In February 2009 the developers of the library asked local residents for memorabilia that the library can use in its exhibits. The library was scheduled to open on November 14, 2009. Renovations took about one and one half years. As part of the renovation process, the school's windows were removed, restored, and reinstalled, and the brick on the east, south, and west sides of the building was cleaned and preserved. The north side received a set of matching bricks. The library's appearance is intended to match its original 1926 appearance. The library opened by December 2009. The library system digitized some of the materials it received so the material would be available online as well as in person. In November 2010 members of the Gregory Library Watch, a group started in January 2010, accused the library of deliberately not archiving certain historical documents. Lenwood Johnson, an organization member, stated that the library refused to archive documents about an effort to prevent the closing of Allen Parkway Village, and Timothy O'Brien, a member of the group, said "They don't want to hear the low-income black history because it indicts the African-American politicians."

== Collections ==
- Christia Adair

== See also ==
- History of the African Americans in Houston
- List of Houston Independent School District schools
- Moorland–Spingarn Research Center
- Auburn Avenue Research Library on African American Culture and History
- Schomburg Center for Research in Black Culture
- Amistad Research Center
