= Haji Husein Alireza & Co. Ltd. =

Saudi conglomerate

Haji Husein Alireza & Co. Ltd. (HHA) الحاج حسين علي رضا وشركاه المحدودة
- Type: Private
- Founded: 1906
- Headquarters: Jeddah, Saudi Arabia
- Key people: Amin Abulhassan (Chairman) Ali Hussain Alireza (CEO)
- Number of employees: 5123
- Website: http://www.hha.com.sa

Haji Husein Alireza & Co. Ltd. (HHA) is a Saudi-based conglomerate. It was established as a general trading company in 1906 with diverse interests, including automobiles, foodstuffs, building materials, and jewelry. It is Saudi Arabia's second oldest company.

== History ==
Formed in 1906 as an offshoot of the House of Alireza & Abulhassan.

Haji Husein Alireza & Co. acquired NATCOM, a Saudi IT and hardware company established in 1978.

Haji Hussein Alireza & Company is consistently ranked among the top 100 companies in Saudi Arabia.

== Automobiles ==
Although HHA's business has been relatively diversified throughout the years, the automotive field remained the main area of the company's activities. In 1926, HHA became the first company to import and distribute automobiles on a commercial basis in the Arabian Peninsula.

The Haji Hussein Alireza & Company is one of the largest distributors of automobiles in Saudi Arabia. The company is the exclusive distributor of Aston Martin, Mazda and MAN Commercial Vehicles in Saudi Arabia. In 2011, the company gained distribution rights for Geely and Peugeot in Saudi Arabia.

Since 1968, HHA has represented Mazda in Saudi Arabia, and became its exclusive distributor. In the first 10 months of 1978, out of the 212,000 vehicles that were imported in Saudi Arabia, HHA accounted of importing 35,000 vehicles (%90 of which was the four-door sedan Mazda 929). In the same year, HHA was selling an average of 3,500 cars a month.

In 2011 the company signed a deal with Geely to import and distribute Geely cars in Saudi Arabia. In 2016 became the exclusive distributor in the kingdom.

Peugeot and HHA ended their partnership as of January 2018.

== See also ==
- House of Alireza
