= Housing Alliance HTX =

Public housing authority in Houston, Texas, United States

Housing Alliance HTX, formerly Houston Housing Authority (HHA) and Housing Authority of the City of Houston (HACH), is the public housing authority in Houston, Texas.

The Mayor of Houston appoints the board of directors of the HHA, but it itself is not a department of the city government. Most of its funding originates from the Federal Government of the United States. In 2002 Mike Snyder of the Houston Chronicle wrote that the HHA had "considerable autonomy" and often operated at a "distance" from the city authorities, making it "far more independent" from municipal authority than the actual City of Houston Department of Housing and Community Development.

== History ==
One year after the passage of the Housing Act of 1937 from the federal government, Houston City Council established the HHA, and in the following year its first public housing properties opened.

At one time William McClellan served as the executive director of HACH. Beginning in 1977 its finances were no longer balanced. In 1982 Mayor Kathy Whitmire appointed an African-American named Earl Phillips as the executive director. Later Joy Fitzgerald served as executive director.

There was considerable controversy involving the 1996 redevelopment of Allen Parkway Village in the Fourth Ward into Historic Oaks of Allen Parkway Village, which halved the capacity of the complex.

In April 2017 budget cuts in the federal government occurred, leading the HHA to terminate some of the housing choice vouchers it had already given away and stop issuing new ones; this freeze was to be in effect until around the end of the year.

In 2026 the organization changed its operating name to "Housing Alliance HTX".

== Properties ==
=== Family housing ===
All properties are in the City of Houston. With two exceptions (as of 2019), each property is within the Houston Independent School District (HISD).

- Clayton Homes - Second Ward
- Cuney Homes - Third Ward
- Ewing Apartments
  - Zoned schools: Poe Elementary School, Cullen Middle School, and Lamar High School.
- Forest Green Townhomes
  - Zoned schools: Thurgood Marshall Elementary School, Forest Brook Middle School, and North Forest High School.
- Fulton Village - Northside
  - Zoned schools: Clemente Martinez Elementary School, Marshall Middle School, and Northside High School (formerly Jefferson Davis High School).
- Heatherbrook Apartments - Northside
  - Zoned schools: Garcia Elementary School, Henry Middle School, and Sam Houston Math, Science, and Technology Center (High School).
- Historic Oaks of Allen Parkway Village - Fourth Ward
- Historical Rental Initiative - Fourth Ward
  - This is the management of thirty single-family houses in the Fourth Ward designated for HHA tenants. Residents of the Fourth Ward are zoned to Gregory-Lincoln Education Center for K-8 and Heights High School (formerly John H. Reagan High School).
- Irvington Village - Northside
  - Lenwood Johnson, an activist who spearheaded a campaign against the destruction of Allen Parkway Village, lived in Irvington Village after APV's redevelopment. By 2001 the HHA was trying to evict him, stating he owed $4,000 for the operation of utilities. In 2001, after the HHA agreed to provide a moving service, Johnson agreed to vacate.
  - Zoned schools: C. Martinez Elementary School, Marshall Middle School, and Northside High School.
- Kelly Village - Fifth Ward
- Kennedy Place - Fifth Ward
  - Kennedy Place first opened as a 60 unit development in 1982. The HHA used $7.8 million, including some federal stimulus funds, to redevelop the housing. The demolition of the old Kennedy Place began on December 28, 2009. In January 2011 the new Kennedy Place opened, with 108 units (20 one bedroom, 58 two bedroom, 23 three bedroom, and 4 four bedroom).
  - Zoned schools: Bruce Elementary School, McReynolds Middle School, and Wheatley High School.
- Lincoln Park
  - Zoned schools: Wesley Elementary School, Williams Middle School, and Booker T. Washington High School.
- Long Drive Townhomes
  - Zoned schools: Juan Seguin Elementary School, Hartman Middle School, and Sterling High School
- Mansions at Turkey Creek
  - The complex is within the Aldine Independent School District, and has the following zoned schools: Magrill Early Childhood/Pre-Kindergarten/Kindergarten School, Ogden Elementary School, Teague Middle School, Nimitz Ninth Grade School, and Nimitz High School.
- Oxford Place
  - Zoned schools: Burbank Elementary School, Burbank Middle School, and Houston MSTC.
- Peninsula Park/The Peninsula
  - Zoned schools: Billy Reagan K-8 School, and Madison High School.
- Sweetwater Point
  - Zoned schools are: Mitchell Elementary School, Thomas Middle School, and Sterling High School.
- Uvalde Ranch Apartments
  - Zoned schools are: Oates Elementary School, Holland Middle School, and Furr High School.
- Victory Place - Fourth Ward
  - Zoned schools are: Gregory-Lincoln for K-8 and Heights High.
- Willow Park Apartments
  - It is within the Fort Bend Independent School District (FBISD), and is zoned to E. A. Jones Elementary School, Missouri City Middle School, and Thurgood Marshall High School.

=== Senior housing ===
Senior housing:

- 2100 Memorial Drive Apartments
  - This is a high-rise facility. As of 2017 it had 185 residents. In 2017 Hurricane Harvey caused flooding but not any power outages. The HHA began removing residents, but Harris County Civil District Judge Daryl L. Moore gave an injunction. In 2019 the HHA announced plans to rebuild the complex, but stated that for now residents need to move to other accommodations.
- Bellerive
- Lyerly
- The Pinnacle at Wilcrest
- Telephone Rd.
- Villas on Winkler

== Headquarters ==
It is headquartered in western Houston.

At one time the agency had its headquarters at Allen Parkway Village, and therefore did not have to pay rent to house its administrative facilities. As conditions at APV deteriorated, the agency moved its headquarters to 2640 Fountain View, Houston, Texas.

== See also ==
- Harris County Housing Authority
