= HHA Services =

Health facilities management company

- Industry: Healthcare Support Services Management
- Founded: 1974
- Headquarters: St. Clair Shores, MI, United States
- Key people: Paul Fayad, CEO; Dan Bowen, President
- Services: Foodservice, Facility Management
- Website: HHAServices.com

HHA Services is a privately held, American-owned company, providing food and facilities management services for hospitals and long-term care communities in the United States. It is headquartered in St. Clair Shores, Michigan.

== History ==
HHA Services, originally Hospital Housekeepers of America, was founded in 1974 by Daniel W. Bowen Jr. in Detroit, MI. The company diversified in 1982 and founded Consolidated Building Services to provide janitorial service to medical office buildings, clinics and commercial buildings.

In 1983, Medical Pest Control was founded to provide pest control services to healthcare clients. Bowen Educational Systems was developed to provide training programs that were sold throughout the country.

By 1985, HHA Services had become one of the largest building service contractors in South East Michigan.

In 1987, Paul Fayad developed Envirocor software for use in Housekeeping applications.

In 1990, expanded to become a national healthcare contract management company, and subsequently Consolidated Building and Medical Pest Control were sold. The firm was renamed HHA Services to better reflect our diversity of services. Dan Bowen Jr. retired and Paul Fayad was appointed President/CEO. Dan Bowen, III became Executive Vice President.

2000, Paul Fayad and Dr. Allen May form Video Artists and begins development of custom training videos for HHA Services' employees. The first Customer Service video is produced.

2003, has a three-part Customer Service Series for healthcare service departments and continues to make new videos each year.

2005, launched its Food & Nutrition Division.

2008, partnered with the University of Michigan Ross School of Business to conduct in-depth studies on proactivity.

2009, achieves 35th year of service. Placed 3rd in their category as A Cool Place to Work in Tough Times by Detroit Crain's Magazine and the American Society of Employers.

2010, named one of America's Top 100 Best Places to Work in Healthcare by Modern Healthcare magazine, ranking 21st overall and 4th in the small business category.

== Services ==
HHA Services offers support service management in the areas of Plant Operations/Maintenance, Housekeeping, Laundry, Patient Transportation, Security and Food Services including Patient Dining, Senior Dining, Clinical Nutrition, Retail Food Service and Consulting.
