= Fourth Ward, Houston =

Historic district in Houston, Texas, United States of America

Coordinates: 29.756°N 95.381°W

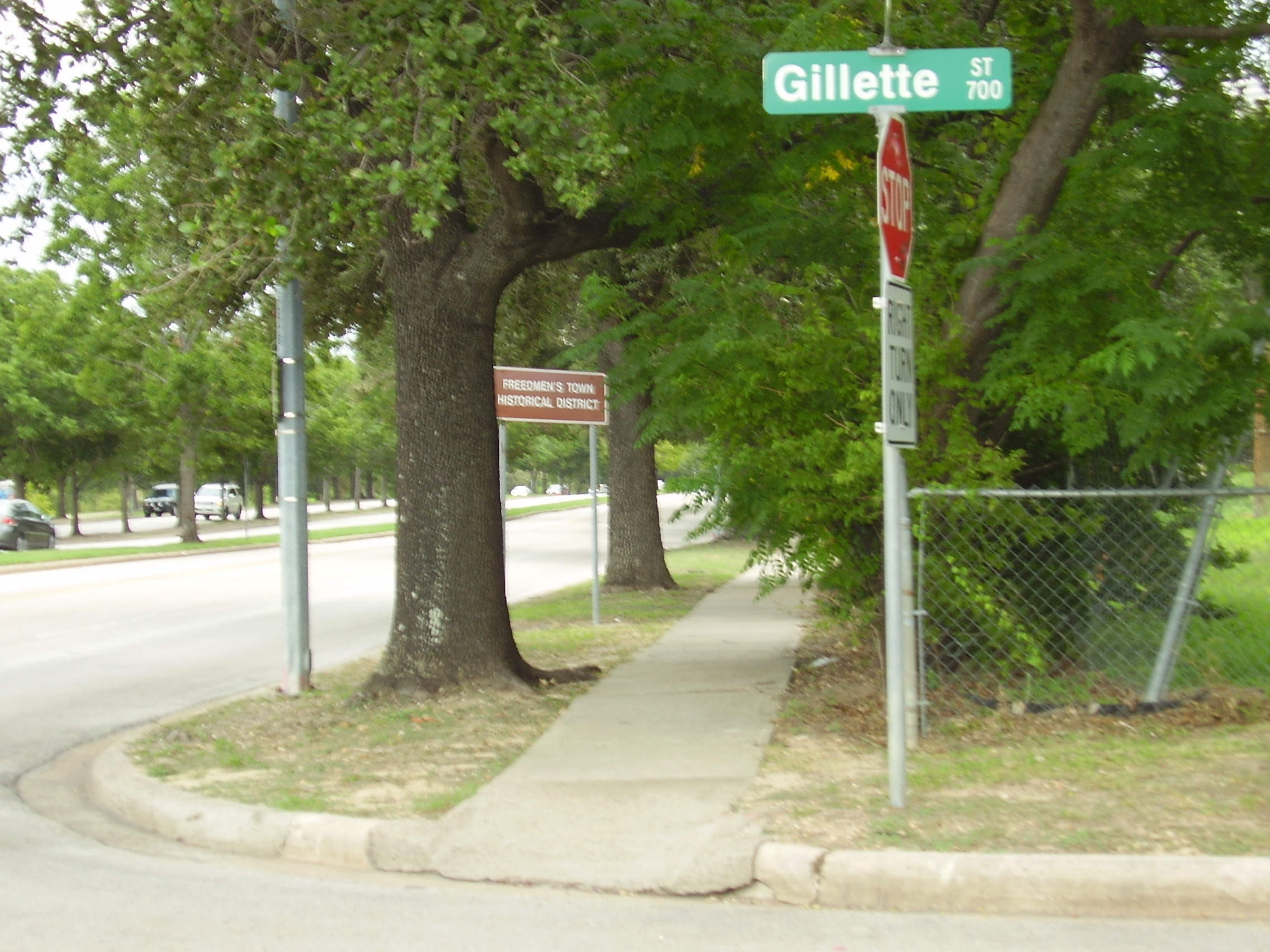
Freedmen's Town Historic District

Fourth Ward is one of the historic six wards of Houston, Texas, United States. The Fourth Ward is located inside the 610 Loop directly west of and adjacent to Downtown Houston. The Fourth Ward is the site of Freedmen's Town, which was a post-U.S. Civil War community of African-Americans.

== History ==
=== Early history ===
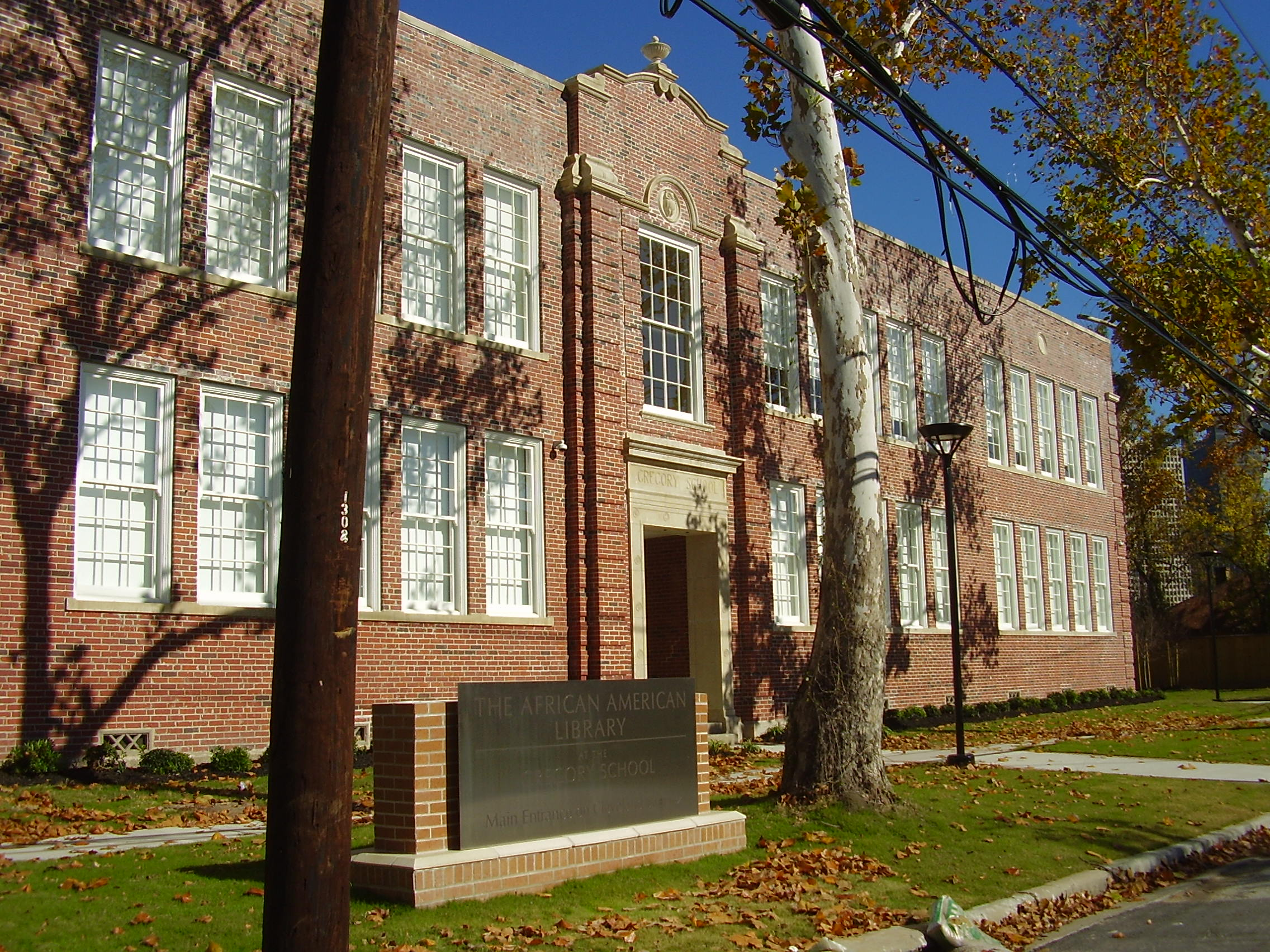
The former Edgar M. Gregory School, now the African American Library at the Gregory School

The Fourth Ward was established as one of four wards by the City of Houston in 1839. By 1906 it included much of what is, as of 2008, Downtown and Neartown; at that point the city stopped using the ward system.

The area was the site of Freedman's Town, composed of recently freed slaves. The first freed slaves departed the Brazos River cotton plantations in 1866 and entered Houston via San Felipe Road (now named West Dallas in the portion from Downtown Houston to Shepherd Drive). The slaves settled on the Buffalo Bayou's southern edge, constructing small shanties as houses. Brush arbors along the bayou and borrowed churches were used as houses of worship. Several more ex-slaves leaving plantations arrived in Freedmen's Town. One brush arbor ultimately became the Antioch Missionary Baptist Church, the church where Jack Yates served as pastor. Yates and his son, Rutherford Yates, became major community leaders in the early days of the Fourth Ward. The neighborhood became the center of Houston's African-American community in the late 19th century and early 20th century.

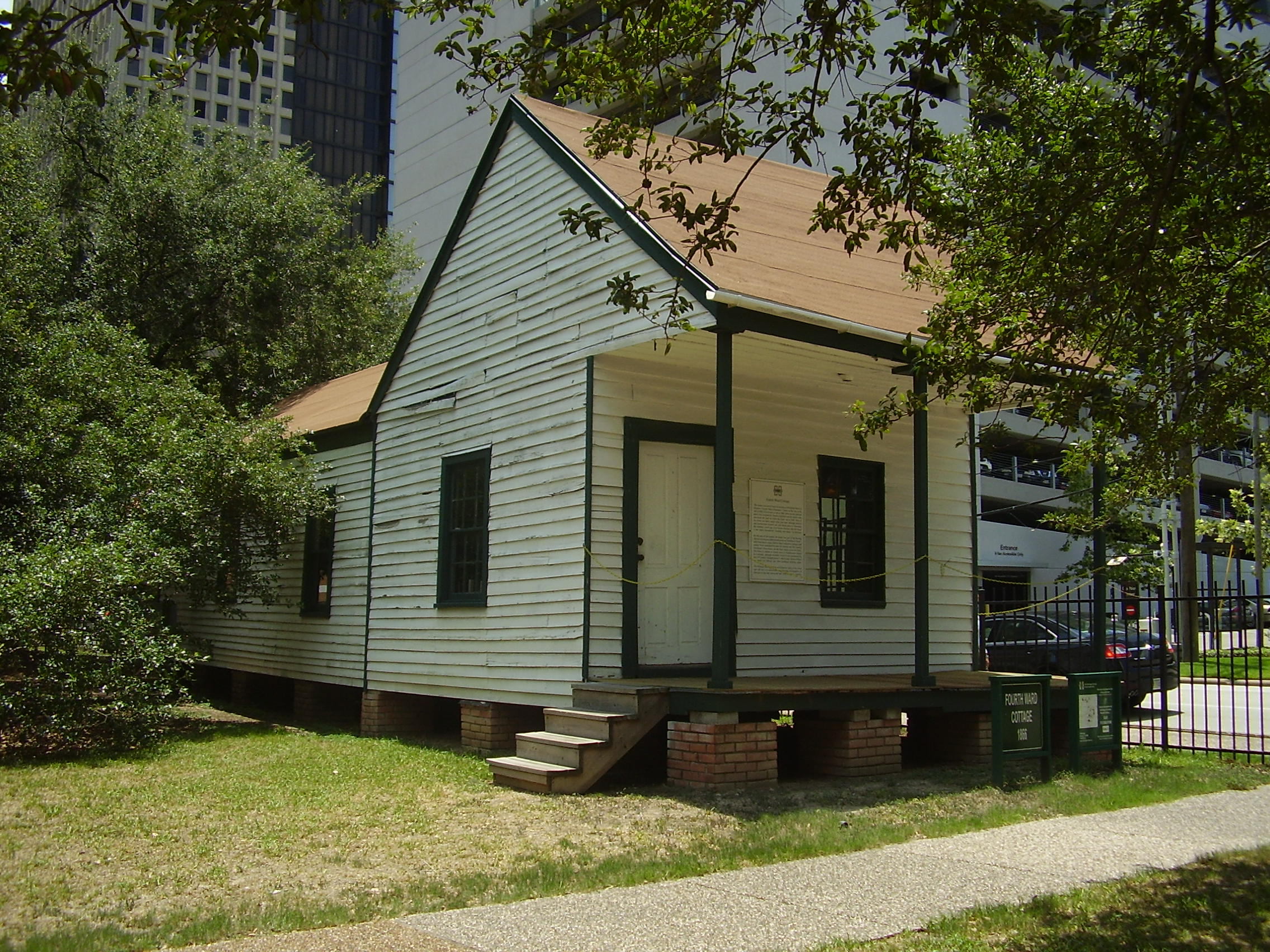
The "Fourth Ward Cottage" - A cottage dating back to at least 1866 that is now in Sam Houston Park in Downtown Houston

The 1,000 freed slaves who settled the community selected the site along the southern edge of the Buffalo Bayou since the land was inexpensive and because White Americans did not want to settle on the land, which was swampy and prone to flooding. The settlers of Freedmen's Town paved the streets with bricks that they hand-made themselves. An oral tradition said that in the early 20th century, members of the congregation of the Reverend Jeremiah Smith paved Andrew Street with the first bricks after the City of Houston refused to pave it. Yates, Smith, and Ned P. Pullum were three of the major Fourth Ward area ministers. The residents provided their own services and utilities. Residents included blacksmiths, brickmakers, doctors, haberdashers, lawyers, and teachers.

From 1905 through the 1940s, the Freedman's Town area included what was Houston's largest baseball venue through 1927, West End Park. It was home to the city's Minor League baseball team, the Houston Buffaloes, and it was the city's first venue for Negro Major League games.

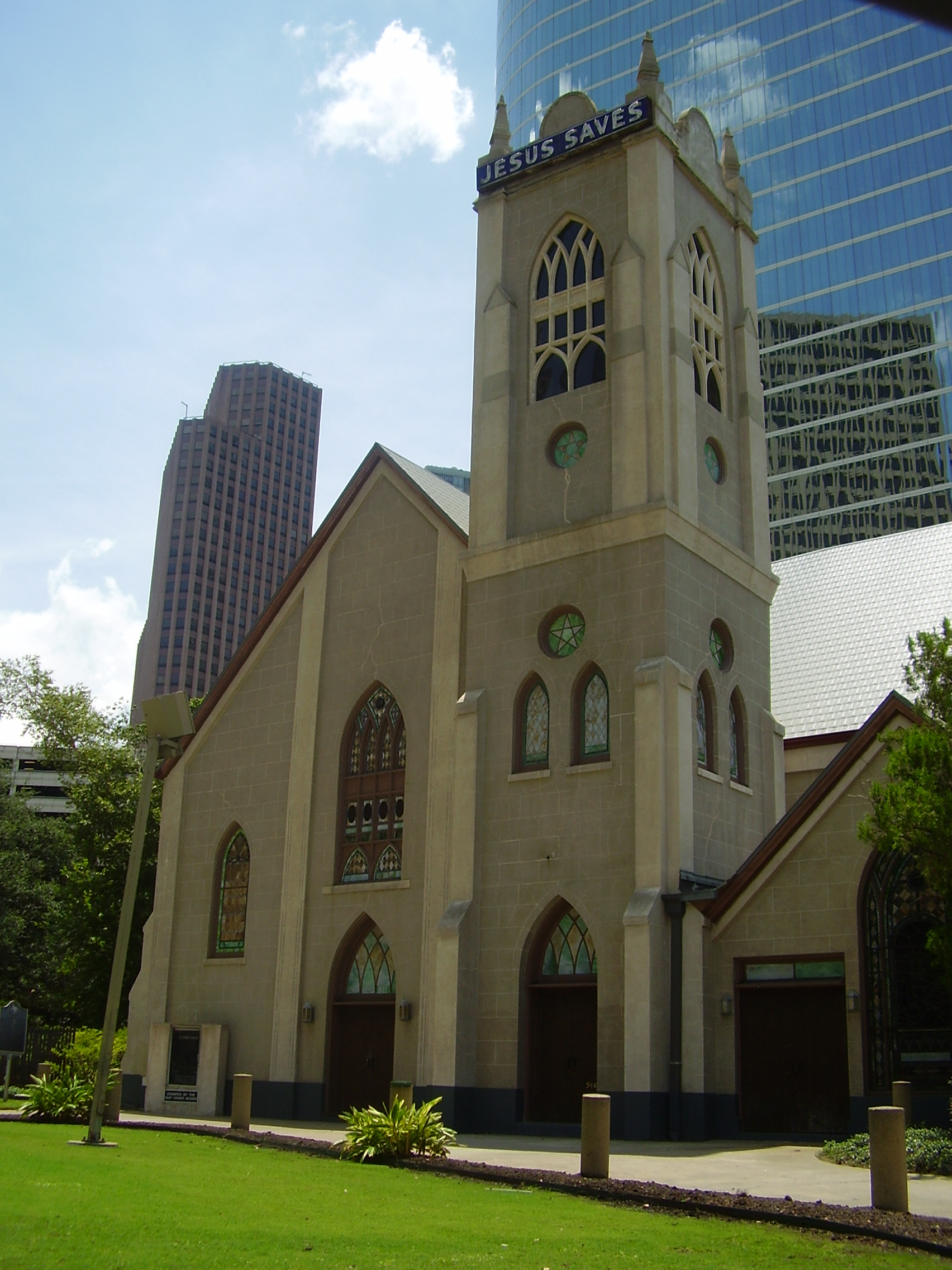
Antioch Missionary Baptist Church, now in Downtown Houston

At the turn of the century, black ministers established businesses and churches and remained as community leaders. During the same period, Italian Americans moved into the Fourth Ward, including Freedmen's Town. The Italian Americans opened small businesses and, over a period of time, acquired more and more Fourth Ward property. Many had extended mercantile credit to customers, and seized property from the customers after they failed to pay off their debts. Their descendants, as of the year 2000, continued to be the owners of many residences in the Fourth Ward.

In 1909, African Americans organized a library at Booker T. Washington High School. They were prohibited from accessing Houston's Lyceum and public library. In 1912 the Carnegie Colored Library of Houston was dedicated. It was demolished in 1962 when Interstate 45 was constructed through the Fourth Ward.

As more and more families moved in, the neighborhood increasingly became crowded. A narrative that accompanied the 1984 application of the Fourth Ward to become listed in the National Register of Historic Places, based on various historical documents and deed records, said that the crowded conditions and high rent prices may have led to a riot in 1917 when African-American soldiers stationed in the area attacked White people. By the 1920s and 1930s the population density of Freedmen's Town was almost six times that of the average of the entire City of Houston.

In the 1920s the Third Ward surpassed the Fourth Ward as the center of Houston's African-American community.

=== Decline ===
The Fourth Ward lost prominence due to its inability to expand geographically, as other developments hemmed in the area. Mike Snyder of the Houston Chronicle said that local historians traced the earliest signs of decline to 1940, and that it was influenced by many factors, including the opening of Interstate 45 and the construction of Allen Parkway Village, a public housing complex of the Housing Authority of the City of Houston or HACH (now Houston Housing Authority) that opened in the 1940s. Located on the north side of the Fourth Ward, it originally was an all-White development that had the name San Felipe Courts.

The opening of Interstate 45 in the 1950s separated an eastern portion of the Fourth Ward area from the community; that portion became the Allen Center business and hotel complex and is now considered to be a part of Downtown Houston. The freeway also severed the community's connection with Downtown itself. After the civil rights reforms of the 1960s, black homeowners began leaving the Fourth Ward, leading to further decline.

The freeway construction and urban renewal programs led to the loss of portions of the community.

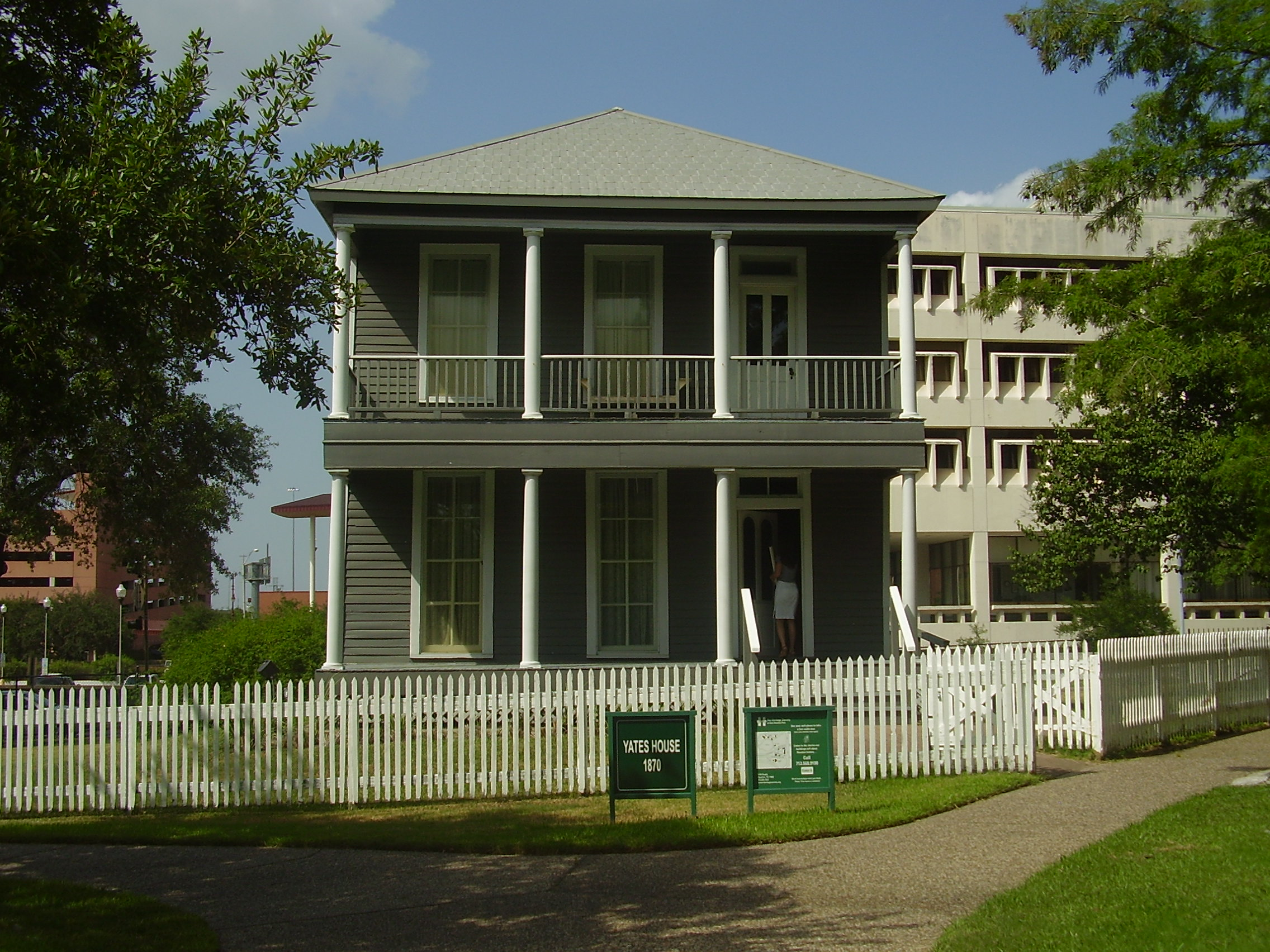
The Jack Yates House, originally in the Fourth Ward and now at Sam Houston Park

=== Redevelopment ===
By the 1970s many of the original Fourth Ward residents left to go to other communities. Crime and the prevalence of crack cocaine became issues affecting the community. Starting in the 1970s the City of Houston wanted to demolish Allen Parkway Village while residents fought to have the entire structure remain. Plans to replace the Fourth Ward with condominiums and a park date to that decade. John Nova Lomax of the Houston Press said that the Fourth Ward had been "embattled" due to its proximity to Downtown Houston and that "Developers have long seen the area's brick streets and ramshackle, century-old shotgun shacks as an inexcusable, poverty-stricken, drug- and crime-infested blot on the landscape of otherwise prosperous Westside, Inner Loop Houston."

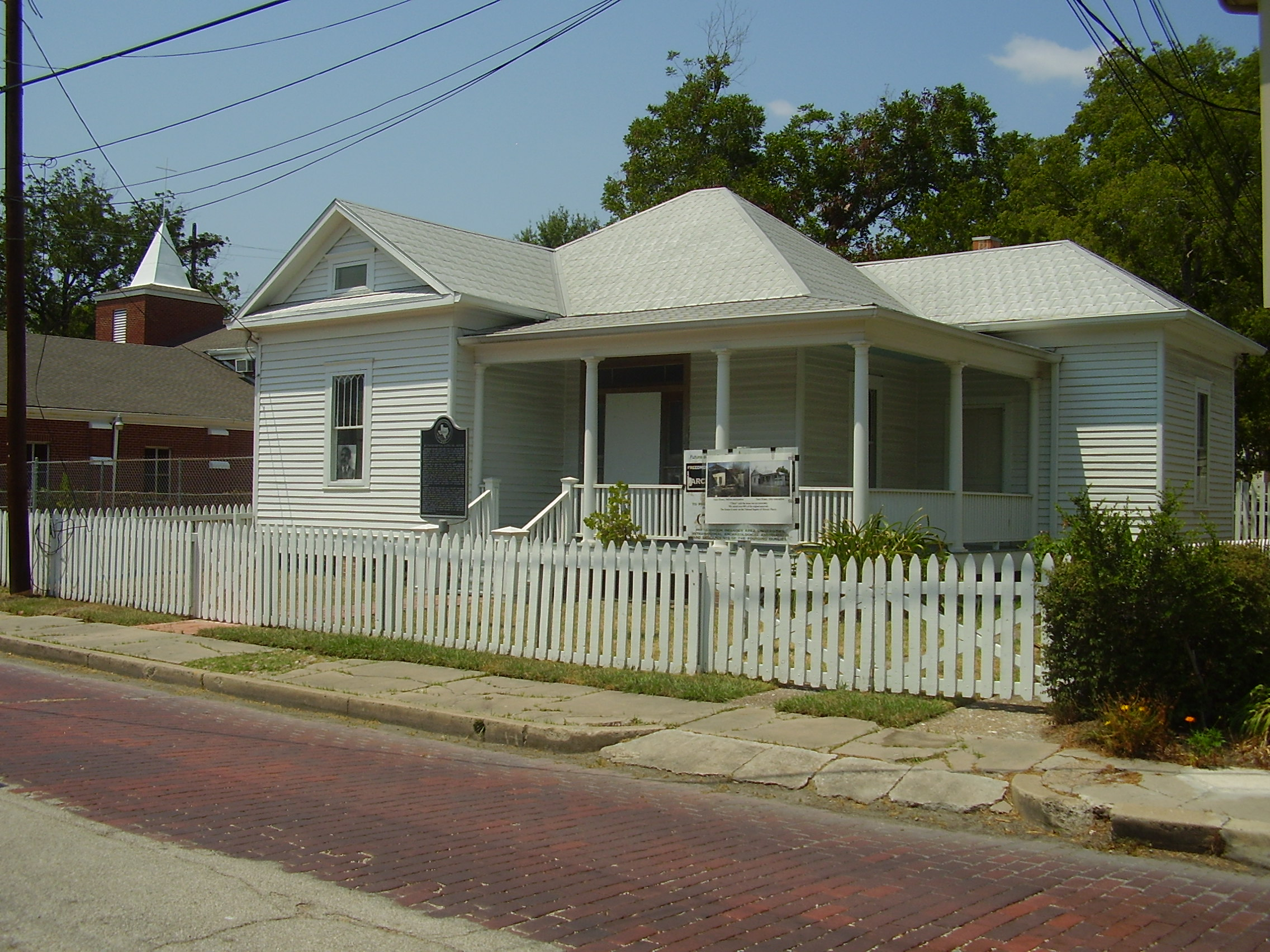
The Rutherford B. H. Yates House

The Handbook of Texas said "In the 1980s and 1990s the continued future of the Fourth Ward as a black community came under serious attack" due to plans to demolish Allen Parkway Village and replace the complex with housing for high income people and office buildings. The Handbook of Texas said that citizen opposition and "more importantly" the mid-1980s economic decline delayed those plans. The Handbook of Texas said that the neglect of the housing units and the resulting disappearance of those units, the reluctance of investors to invest capital into the Fourth Ward, and "future of the neighborhood" all "undermined" "[t]he viability" of the Fourth Ward. On January 17, 1985, Freedmen's Town was added to the National Register of Historic Places list. Because it was placed on the register, federal redevelopment funds could no longer be used to demolish structures.

On Tuesday May 21, 1991 several residents attending a community meeting told Dennis Storemski, then Deputy Chief of the Houston Police Department, that police officers routinely harassed community residents. The people attending the meeting accused police of extorting drug dealers, harassing and stealing from young people, and treating Fourth Ward residents with disrespect. In the summer of 1991, beginning in May several fires occurred in the Fourth Ward, with three buildings affected in each 30-day interval. By August 1991 nine houses, all previously run-down, had been affected by the fires. Gladys House, former head of the Fourth Ward Freedmen's Town Association, and other area activists expressed a belief that the fires were arson intended to allow the owners of the houses to collect insurance money and facilitate redevelopment of the Fourth Ward. Similar fires that occurred during the previous winter were originally believed to have been started by vagrants trying to stay warm, but House said that suspicion increased when fires began occurring in the spring and summer. H.G. Torres, the assistant chief of the arson bureau of the Houston Fire Department, said that the timings of the fires made the bureau suspect arson. The association offered a $1,000 reward for information that resulted in the arrest of any suspect.

In the 1990s a former city planning commission member founded Houston Renaissance, a nonprofit private charity sustained by federal and municipal funds. The charity bought large portions of the community and announced plans to redevelop the parcels into affordable housing. Instead the charity defaulted and the Houston Housing Finance Corp. took control of the lands. The city divided the parcels to the east and the west. The city sold the parcels closest to Downtown Houston to private developers. The city used the acquired funds to develop the remaining parcels into subsidized houses, with each priced around $110,000.

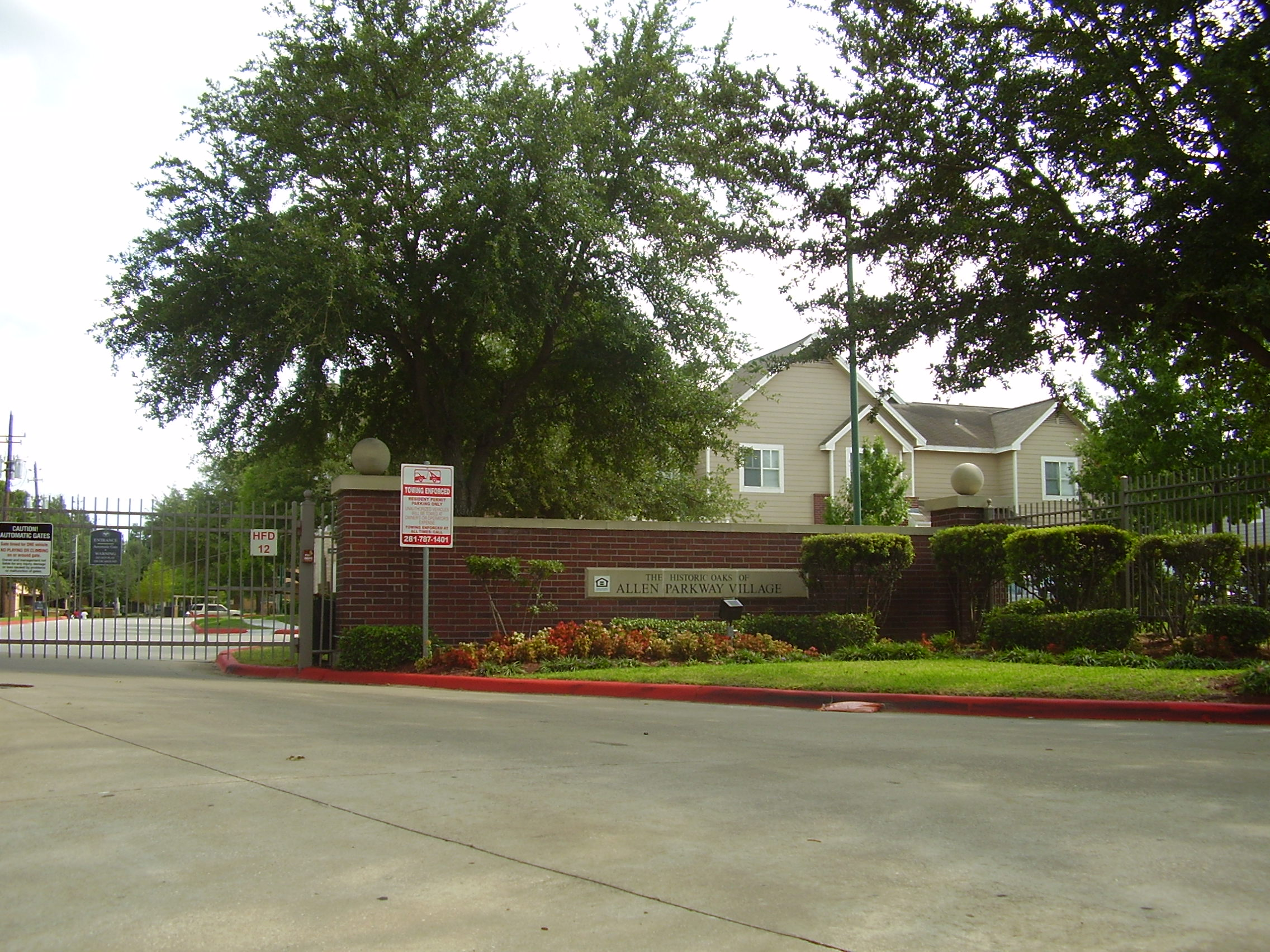
Historic Oaks of Allen Parkway Village

The Houston Housing Authority (HHA), then known as Housing Authority of the City of Houston (HACH), made a unanimous vote to demolish Allen Parkway Village. This caused residents to begin a campaign to rescue the complex, including activist Lenwood Johnson. The legal campaign reached the 5th U.S. Circuit Court of Appeals. In 1996 Henry Cisneros, the head of the U.S. Department of Housing and Urban Development, signed an agreement to allow the City of Houston to demolish 677 of the community's 963 units as long as the site was still used for low income housing. The remaining units have been placed on the National Register of Historic Places.

In the late 1990s and 2000s, the area underwent gentrification, and many new mid-rise apartment complexes and upscale townhomes were built. Beginning in the mid-1990s, the shotgun shacks were torn down, with townhouses replacing them. Many long-time residents, mostly renters, have moved out because they were unable to afford the increasing rent due to rising property values, and when low income renters moved out of the neighborhood, wealthy homeowners moved in. During the late 1990s the Fourth Ward Redevelopment Corporation was founded in order to preserve historical aspects of the community.

By 1999 the remaining 500 residential units of the Allen Parkway Village were renamed to The Historic Oaks of Allen Parkway. Of the 500 units 280 were existing units and 220 were newly constructed with $30 million federal funding. The first new group of tenants consisted of 156 low income elderly individuals.

By 2004, portions of what was the Fourth Ward became a part of the Midtown community. Apartments, restaurants, and townhouses replaced many of the former Fourth Ward historical landmarks. During that year Jeannie Kever of the Houston Chronicle said "many people claim it is too late" to salvage the historical aspects of the community. Marcia Johnson, the chairperson of the Fourth Ward Redevelopment Corp., said "So much has been destroyed." Patricia Smith Prather, the executive director of the Texas Trailblazer Preservation Association, said in 2004 "The developers have literally stolen the Fourth Ward. It's gone. There's no high school there. There's no library there." Garnet Coleman, a Texas state representative of the Third Ward, said in 2009 that the Fourth Ward cannot recapture the sense of community that it used to have. Coleman added "the residents got pushed to the suburbs, and the businesses got wiped away." The Houston Chronicle said that the re-development of the Fourth Ward reflected a general trend of city officials and city residents allowing the destruction of historic houses and that the Fourth Ward was becoming "a western extension of Midtown's condo and loft district." In 2011 Lisa Gray of the Houston Chronicle said "Hardly anyone calls it Freedman's Town or the Fourth Ward anymore. Now it's just Midtown."

In 2007 the municipal government offered to remove the historic bricks from some streets so the city can improve subterranean infrastructure; the city wanted to place the bricks back in place. Some residents and preservationists opposed the measure. The staff of the Houston Chronicle argued that the temporary moving of the bricks was a reasonable measure. In a March 2010 town hall meeting, some residents accused police officers in the area of racial profiling.

Due to areas like Midtown, Montrose, and the Heights becoming low on land for use, plus the Fourth Ward's close proximity to downtown Houston, many developers are now finding the area prime for apartments, office space, and retail developments. New apartment developments have arrived to the Fourth Ward at the intersections of Dallas and Gillette Streets, Saulnier and Crosby Streets, and West Gray and Bailey Streets. Houston-based DC Partners and Tianqing Real Estate Development LLC are in the process of developing The Allen, a multiple high-rise, mixed-use project off Allen Parkway and Gillette Street featuring a Thompson Hotel, condos, apartments, office spaces, and retail/restaurants. This project will connect to Buffalo Bayou Park with a skywalk over Allen Parkway.

== Demographics ==
The population of the Fourth Ward has also been steadily decreasing with each decade. According to the 2000 Census, of the "super neighborhoods" defined by the City of Houston, the Fourth Ward super neighborhood had the lowest population, with 590 households or a total population of 1,706. That year 54% of the residents were Hispanic, 37% were non-Hispanic black, 7% were non-Hispanic white, 2% were non-Hispanic Asians, and 1% were non-Hispanic others. In 2015 the super neighborhood had 4,085 residents. That year 46% of the residents were non-Hispanic whites, 27% were non-Hispanic black folk, 18% were Hispanics, and 9% were non-Hispanic Asians; the percentage of non-Hispanic Asians was zero.

In 1870 36% of the African-Americans in Houston lived in the Fourth Ward, while in 1910 27% lived in the Fourth Ward.

While the area around Freedman's town is traditionally black, Hispanics and non-Hispanic whites have moved to the area in recent years. There were 1,421 black people living in the Fourth Ward census tract in 1990; 635 remained in 2000. In 1990 750 Hispanics lived in the tract, while 875 lived there in 2000. 49 non-Hispanic Whites lived there in 1990, while 180 did in 2000. As of 2000 53.6% of the ward's inhabitants were Hispanic while only 40.7% are in fact black. Overall, Houston has a dissimilarity index of black as compared to whites of approximately 75% according to CensusScope's segregation breakdown of the city, which is higher than the United States national dissimilarity index of 65%.

In 1980, approximately half of the ward's residents were below the poverty line, while 95% of residents did not own their own homes. In the 1980s the Fourth Ward had the poorest African-American community in the city of Houston; the sole residential area had less than 4,400 residents. 50% of the residents were below the poverty level. From the 1980 U.S. Census to the 1990 Census, the Fourth Ward was the sole community in Houston that lost Asian-Americans as many Vietnamese-Americans left Allen Parkway Village. In 2000 J. Don Boney said that blacks owned less than 5% of the land in the Fourth Ward, and much of that land is owned by churches.

== Government ==
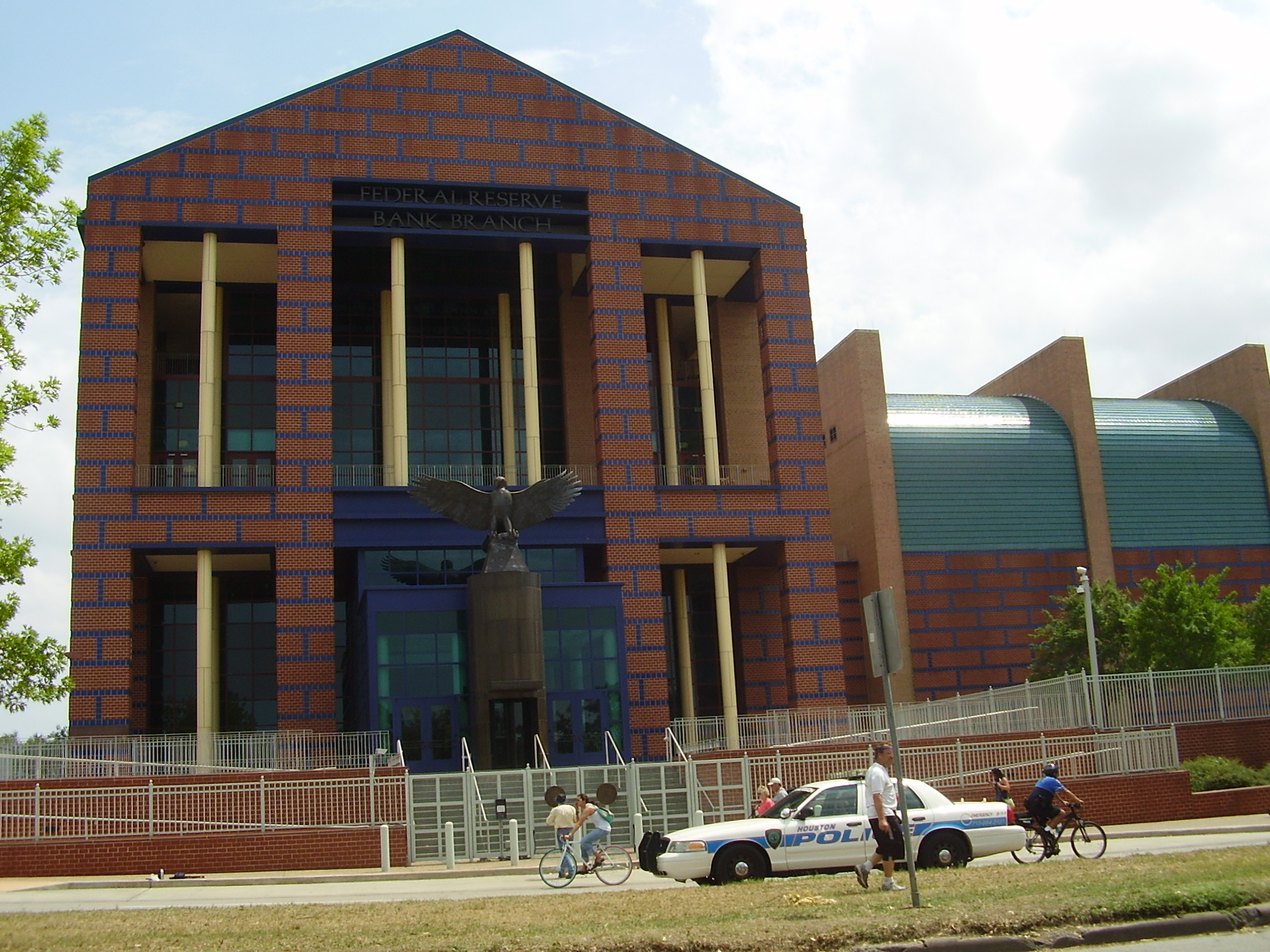
Federal Reserve Bank of Dallas Houston Branch

The community is served by the Houston Fire Department. Station 2 moved to the intersection of West Dallas and Bailey in the Fourth Ward from what is now Downtown Houston in 1965. The station closed in 1986.

The Fourth Ward is within Houston City Council District C. Prior to 2011 it was a part of council district I.

The community is within the Houston Police Department's Central Patrol Division, headquartered at 61 Riesner.

The following Houston Housing Authority public housing complexes are in the Fourth Ward: Historic Oaks of Allen Parkway Village, Historical Rental Initiative (30 single-family houses), and Victory Place.

The Fourth Ward is in Texas's 7th congressional district. As of 2021 Lizzie Fletcher represents the district.

The Federal Reserve Bank of Dallas Houston Branch is located in the Fourth Ward. It sits on the former location of the Jeff Davis Hospital.

Harris Health System (formerly Harris County Hospital District) designated Casa de Amigos Health Center in Northside for the ZIP code 77019. The nearest public hospital is Ben Taub General Hospital in the Texas Medical Center.

== Geography and cityscape ==
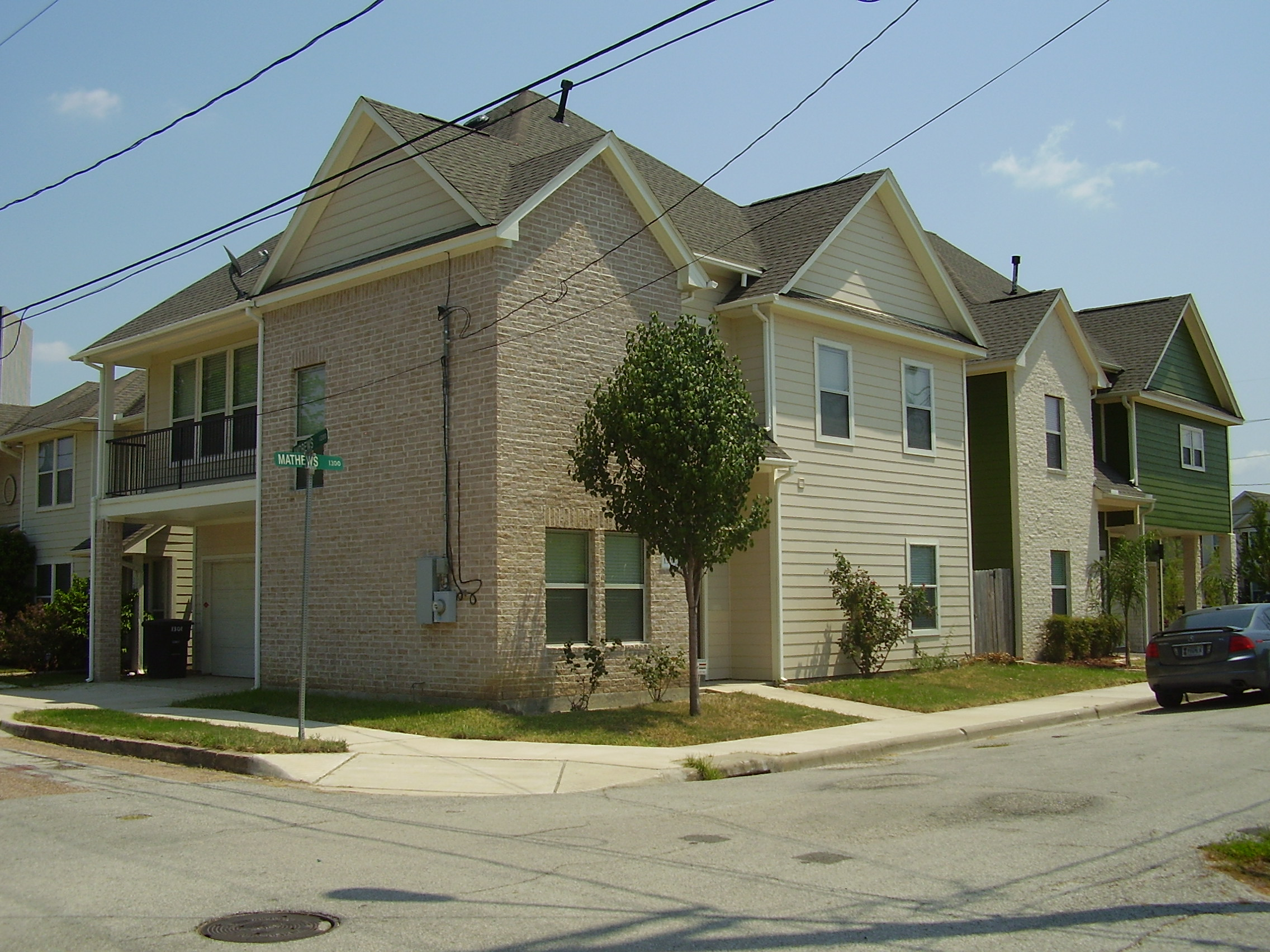
Newer houses in the Fourth Ward

The modern day area that is the Fourth Ward is west of Downtown Houston and extends roughly to Taft and Webster. The area consists of 40 city blocks. The modern day definition corresponds with U.S. Census tract 4101. The Downtown Houston skyline is less than 1 mile (1.6 km) from the Fourth Ward, and is the site of Houston's first city cemetery, which still stands today as Founders Memorial Cemetery. Allen Parkway Village occupies 37 acres (15 ha) of land. The former political district, when it was disestablished in 1906, extended south to Richmond Avenue and west to Montrose Boulevard, and included much of what is now Downtown today. Its boundaries included Congress Avenue to the north, Main Street to the East, and the Rice University area to the south.

Initially the community was made up of 28 blocks west of the center of Houston, north of San Felipe Road and south of the Buffalo Bayou. These appear in 1875 maps.

In 1984 the community had 563 surveyed historic structures. The community had 530 historic buildings on 64 acres (26 ha) of land when it was designated a site of the National Register of Historic Places on January 17, 1985. In 2007, David Ellison of the Houston Chronicle said that, according to Fourth Ward community leaders, 40 historic buildings remained, and that they were located in an area roughly bounded by Arthur, Gennessee, West Dallas, and West Gray. Since 1984 over 500 of the surveyed historic buildings were demolished. These buildings included businesses, churches, and houses. By 2012, 30 of the surveyed historic structures remained. Of the 13 surveyed churches, six still existed in 2012. Debbi Head, a spokesperson for the Texas Historical Commission, said "What's distinct about Freedmen's Town is not just a given building but the concentration of these buildings in their original setting on the relatively narrow streets. That gives you an indication of what life was really like." In the Jim Crow era Taft Street was one of the dividing lines between Blacks and Whites; Black families lived east of Taft, while White families lived west of Taft.

Beginning 1908 the area "The Reservation" served as a red light district, but it was demolished by 1944 to make way for Allen Parkway Village.

=== Housing ===
Houston is the largest city in the United States that does not have zoning laws. The traditional shotgun houses that were first built by freed slaves are now mixed with skyscrapers and parking lots. Sherry Thomas of the USA Today stated that the lack of regulation construction in Houston has taken away from the historical landscape of the Fourth Ward.

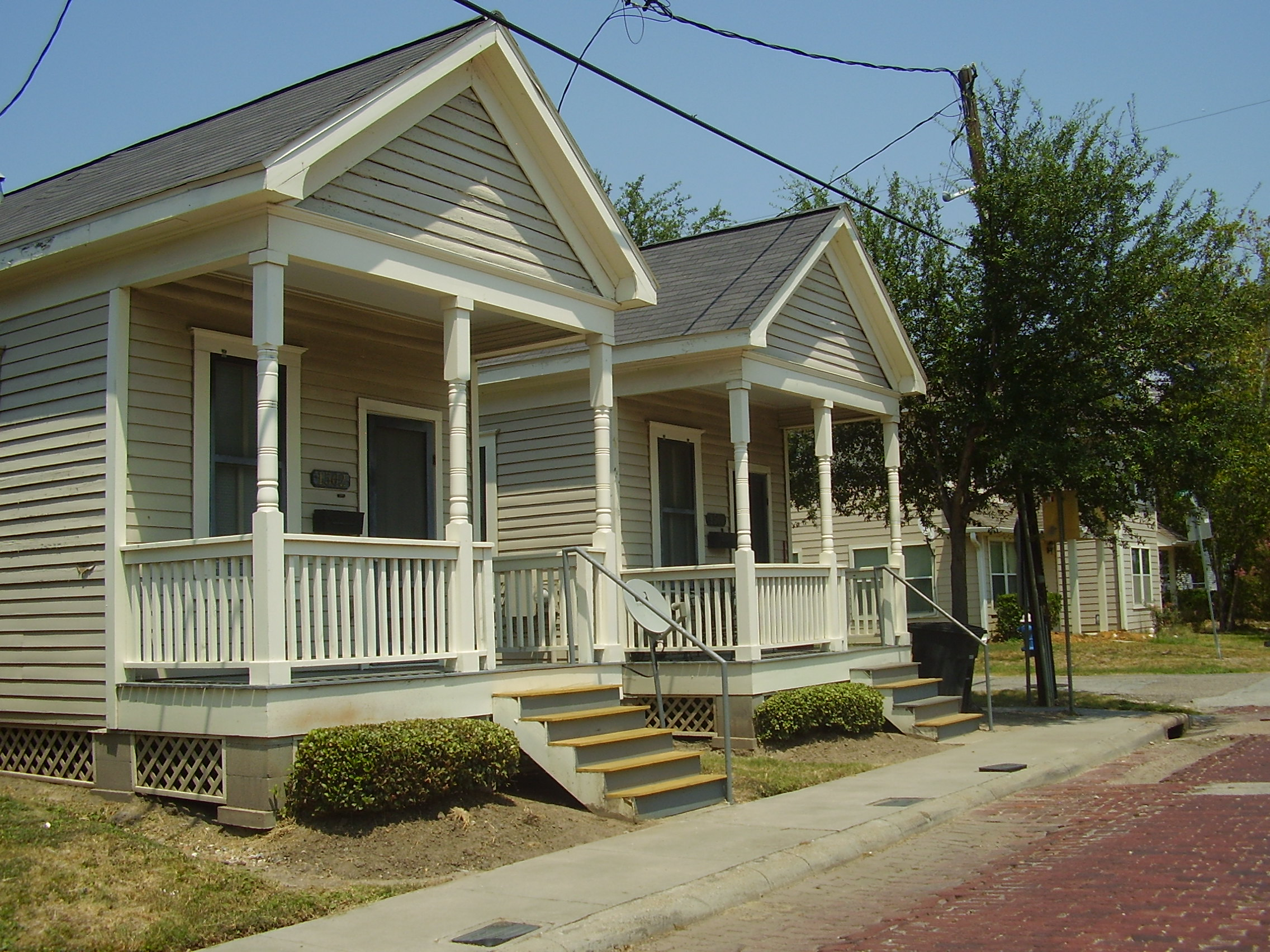
Shotgun shacks in the Fourth Ward

Originally most of the housing consisted of shotgun houses. The one-story houses were long and skinny, and used breezes to cool the interiors. Almost all of the shotgun houses had large front porches; the narrative accompanying the 1984 National Register of Historic Places application said that the porches allowed the houses to cool down, and also allowed residents to talk to neighbors and watch children, who only had the streets as a viable place to play. The narrative said "Significantly, the porch is usually the only element of the houses that exhibits any architectural pretension."

Due to redevelopment, the eastern portion of the Fourth Ward consists of postmodern townhouses built by developers. Many of the townhouses have corrugated metal, and Downtown Houston is visible from the properties. Many young urban professionals and empty nesters live in the townhouses. The area west of Buckner street has many two story suburban style houses on small lots, intended for lower income individuals. As of 2006 few shotgun houses remain in the Fourth Ward. As of 2007 the newer, subsidized market value houses each had a cost of $92,000; most of the shotgun houses were replaced by the market value houses. The townhouses each have a cost twice that of the subsidized houses. Many longtime African-American residents who had lived in the neighborhood for long periods of time were unable to afford to qualify to pay for loans to buy the newer subsidized houses or the townhouses.

==== 1500 block of Victor Street ====
As of 2007 the largest concentration of remaining older homes is on Victor Street, on the south side; the north side of Victor Street has an apartment complex owned by the Houston Housing Authority. Victor Street has the only all-older house cluster remaining in the Fourth Ward, with other clusters being mixes of older and newer homes and multifamily complexes. Lisa Gray of the Houston Chronicle said that the ten shotgun houses on 1501 to 1519 Victor Street, in one row, "were apparently built in two phases." Some were built in 1914, and others were built in a period from 1920 to 1922. She said that they had an identical appearance and were "a typical row of row houses, nothing fancy, nothing special" but "just by surviving, they became special." The houses were listed under the National Historic Register of Historic Places and the Houston Architectural Guide, but the City of Houston law did not protect the buildings from demolition under historic ordinances.

In April 2007 the owners of the houses asked the final residents to move out because the municipal government had cited some of the houses for violations of municipal code. The violations included a failure to maintain clean conditions and problems with the electrical systems. The final resident was scheduled to move out in June of that year. Jill Jewett, the assistant for cultural affairs of Mayor of Houston Bill White, said that the city government wants the community to preserve the 1500 block of Victor houses. Thuong Tran, a member of the family who owned the houses, said that she hoped to lease the property and the houses to a nonprofit that would repair the houses. She said that the family planned to restore the houses, but they were not sure if they would remain at that location, or if the family will sell the land and move the houses themselves to an area outside of the 610 Loop. In 2011 the Harris County Appraisal District stated that the houses were together worth fewer than $750 while the land they stood on was worth over $500,000 more than the house value. The district referred to the houses as an "economic misimprovement." That year, the owners of the ten houses, Kimsu and Kimberly Hoang, filed a demolition permit with the City of Houston.

== Culture ==
Mike Snyder of the Houston Chronicle said that "the politics of race have been a potent force in the Fourth Ward." In the 1920s African-American tenants said that they were paying very high rent for poorly maintained buildings owned by white landlords. After flooding occurred in the neighborhood in one period, an African-American newspaper said that neglect from the city government was responsible. Jesse Jackson toured the Fourth Ward during his 1988 presidential campaign; Jackson accused the city of neglecting the community.

In 2007 David Ellison of the Houston Chronicle wrote that "there is some friction between new and longtime residents, some of whom complain that the redevelopment benefits the newcomers, not them" and that "the two groups seem to lead separate lives, with many newer residents sticking to themselves and longtime people, such as those on Victor Street, trying to continue life as it was." The New Fourth Ward Homeowners Association represents the owners of the newer subsidized houses. Its president, Christine Diaz, said the organization is working to bridge the gap between the old and the new while Mayor of Houston Bill White said that he is trying to bring people together by making improvements to the Fourth Ward that most of its residents want.

== Education ==
=== Primary and secondary schools ===
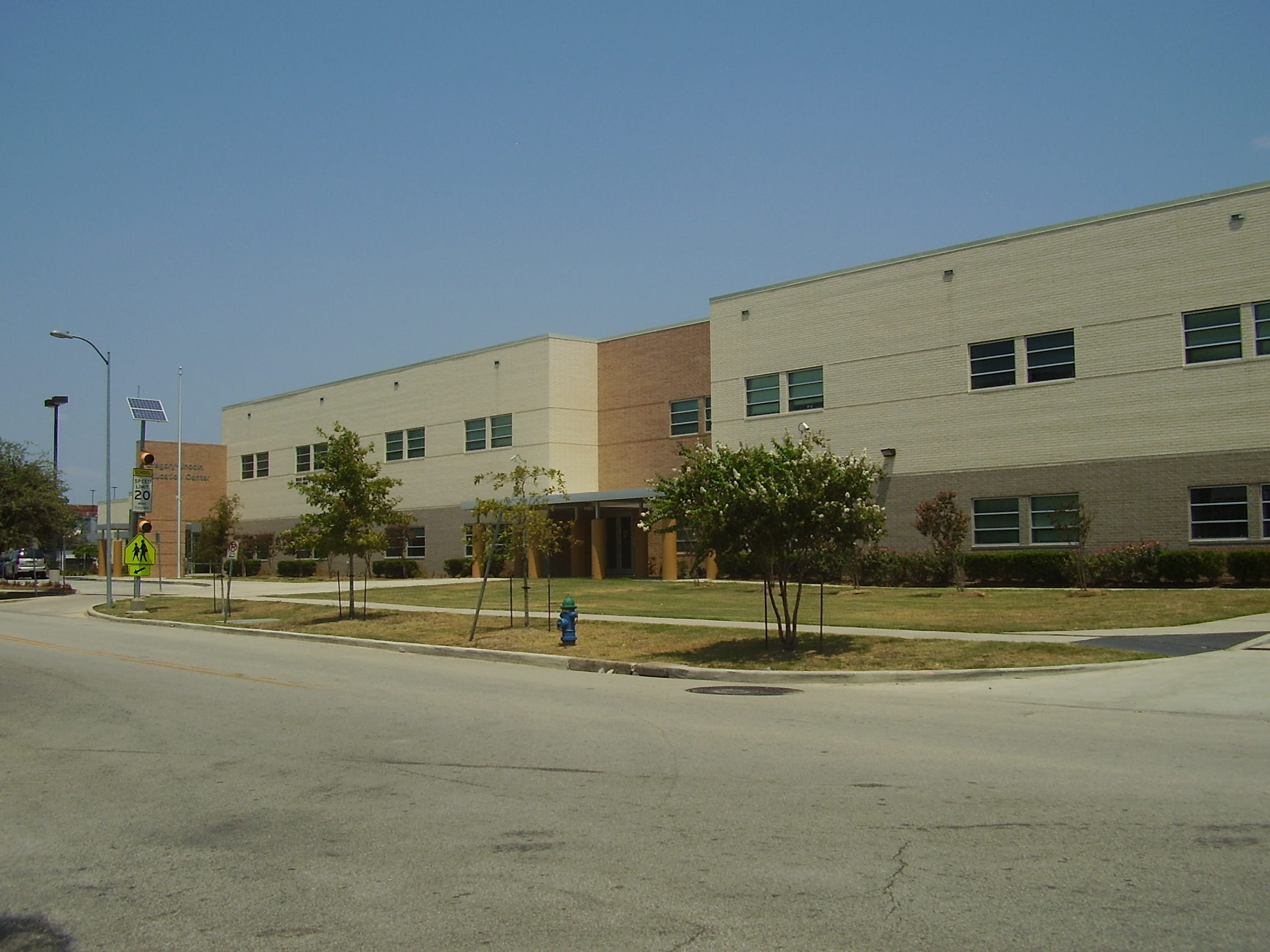
Gregory-Lincoln Education Center

Area students attend schools in the Houston Independent School District, including Gregory-Lincoln Education Center for K-8 and Heights High School (formerly Reagan High School). Carnegie Vanguard High School, a magnet high school, is in the Fourth Ward.

At Gregory Lincoln for the 2006-2007 school year, the student body was 68% African-American, 31% Hispanic, and less than 1% white. Also, 94% of the school's 211 students qualified for free or reduced-price lunch, while 78% of Gregory-Lincoln's attendants are classified as being “at risk." As part of the Houston Independent School District, schools like Gregory Lincoln have around the city average per pupil spending of $5,558 for the 2001-2002 school year, which is considerably lower than that of the state of Texas at $6,850 and the United States average of $7,548 for 2002.

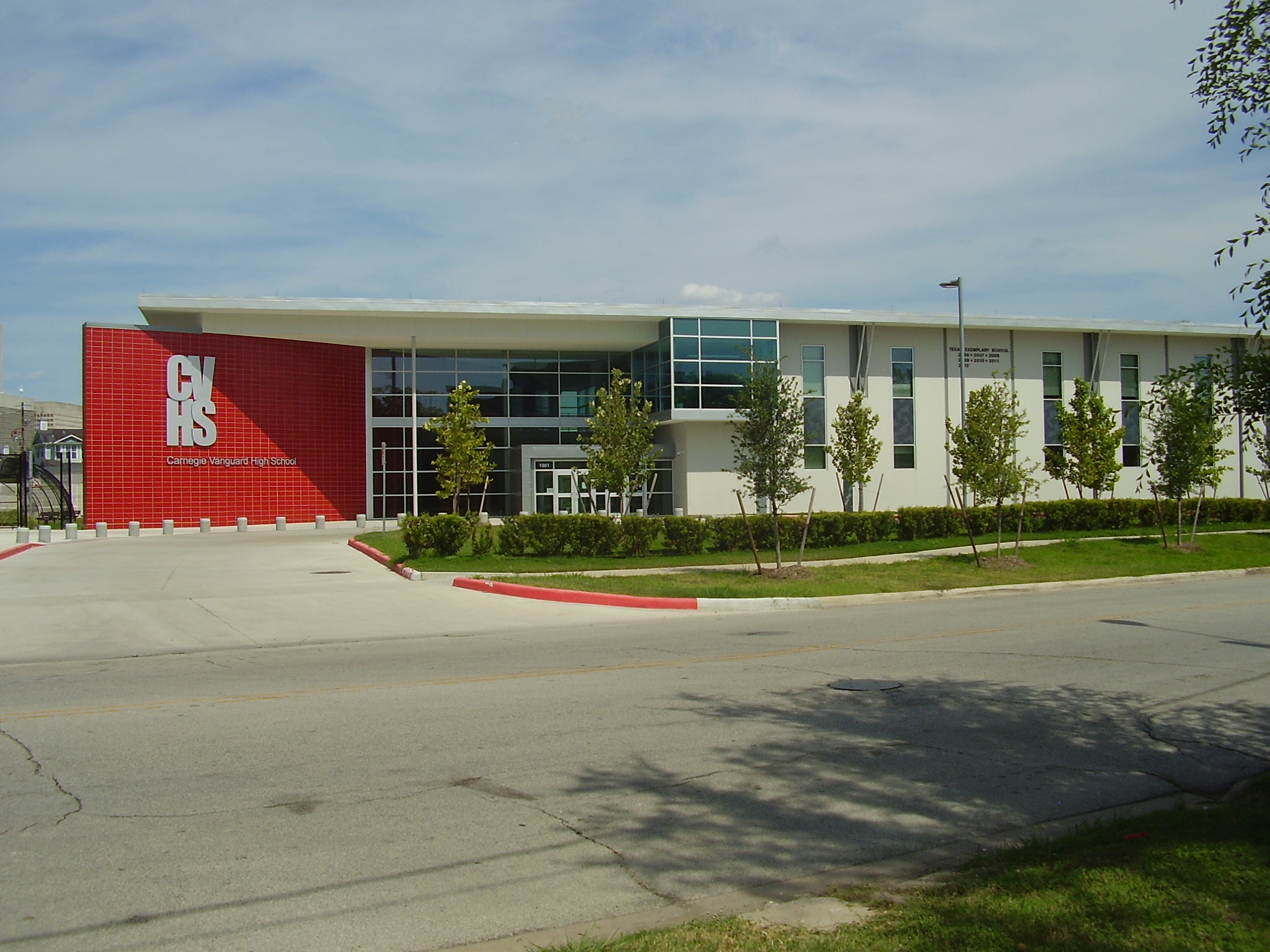
Carnegie Vanguard High School, a magnet school

The Freedmen's Bureau opened schools for children in the area after the establishment of Freedmen's Town. The Texas Legislature authorized the creation of public schools for Freedmen's Town by 1870. By 1872 most of the students and teachers who were at the bureau schools, which were closing, left them to attend the state-managed Gregory Institute, named after Edgar M. Gregory, an officer in the Union army in the U.S. Civil War and the assistant commissioner of the Texas area's Freedmen's Bureau. The school, which first opened in 1872, was the first school for freed slaves in Houston. Mike Snyder of the Houston Chronicle said that it was "perhaps" the first school for freed slaves in the State of Texas. By 1876 the school became a part of the Houston public school system.

The Edgar M. Gregory School, a 20,000-square-foot (1,900 m^{2}) elementary school building, opened in 1926. The community was also served by Lincoln Junior & Senior High School, which at a later point was solely Lincoln Junior High School. In 1980 the district closed the Gregory School and consolidated its students, including elementary ones, into Lincoln. The quoted document stated that area residents perceived the move as trying to destabilize the Fourth Ward and "The closing of Gregory and the shifting of its students to Lincoln was met with intense opposition from Fourth Ward residents." From that period the Gregory School was vacant until its re-purposing as a library. When it was vacant, it had broken windows, a leaky roof that allowed rain to pour into the facility, and pigeons living in the facility. In 2009 the facility was re-purposed as a research library.

On March 21, 2002 the HISD board voted 5-3 to acquire a six block tract of land bounded by Andrews, Genesee, Taft, and West Gray, adjacent to Gregory Lincoln, for construction of a new school. 70 families were to be evicted from their houses. Anthony Pizzitola, an owner of one of the houses and a resident of Braeswood, started a campaign against the acquisition, arguing that the district was trying to take valuable real estate rather than genuinely trying to build new schools. In 2009 the HISD administration proposed relocating Carnegie Vanguard High School from a location near the Sunnyside neighborhood to the Fourth Ward. District administrators favored the move because students come from across the school district, and the central location would make transportation easier. During that year the school board approved of the plan.

=== Public libraries ===
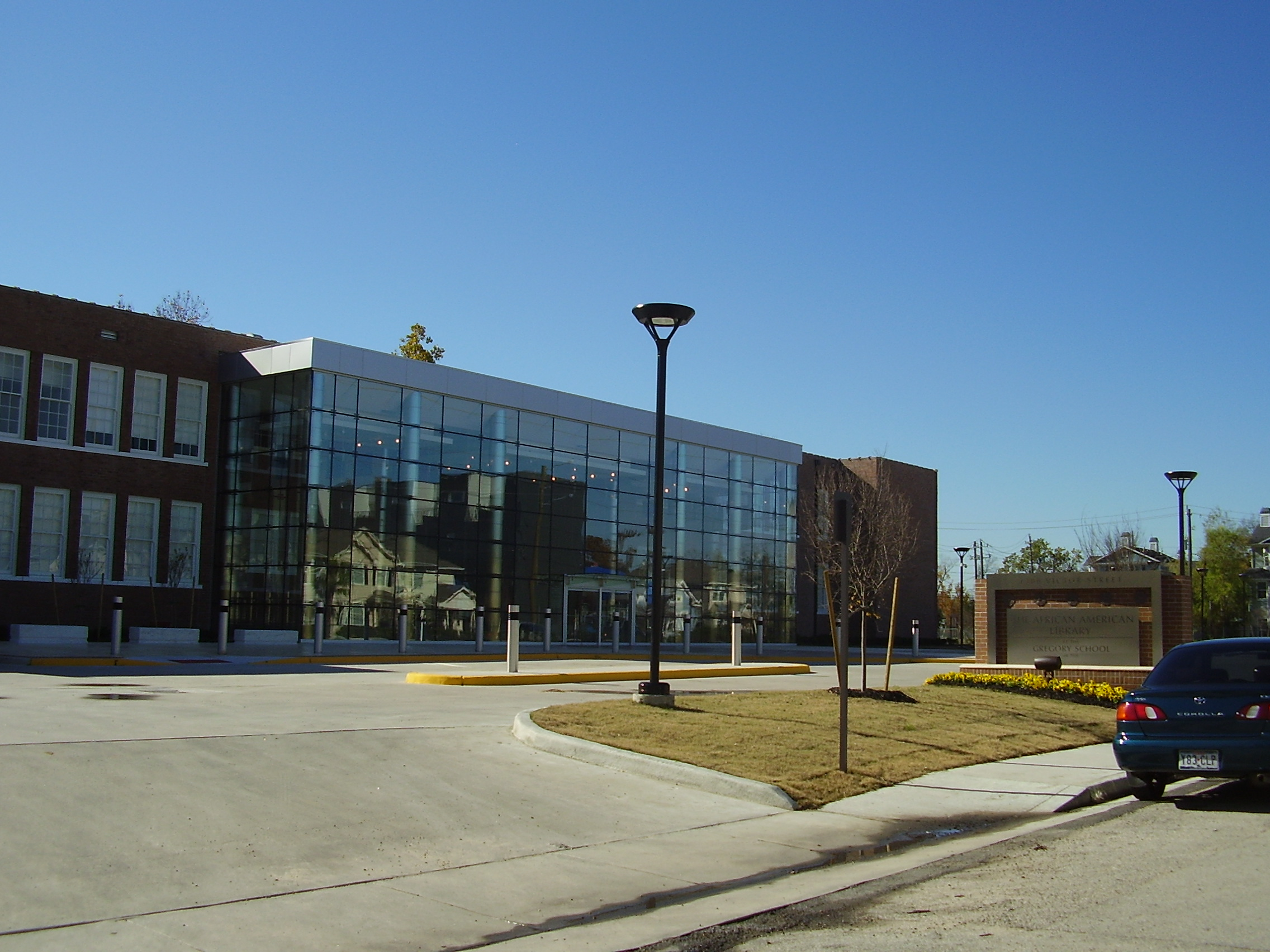
African American Library at the Gregory School

The Houston Public Library operates the African American Library at the Gregory School. The library preserves historical information about the African-American community in Houston. It is the city's first library to focus on African-American history and culture.

== Parks and recreation ==
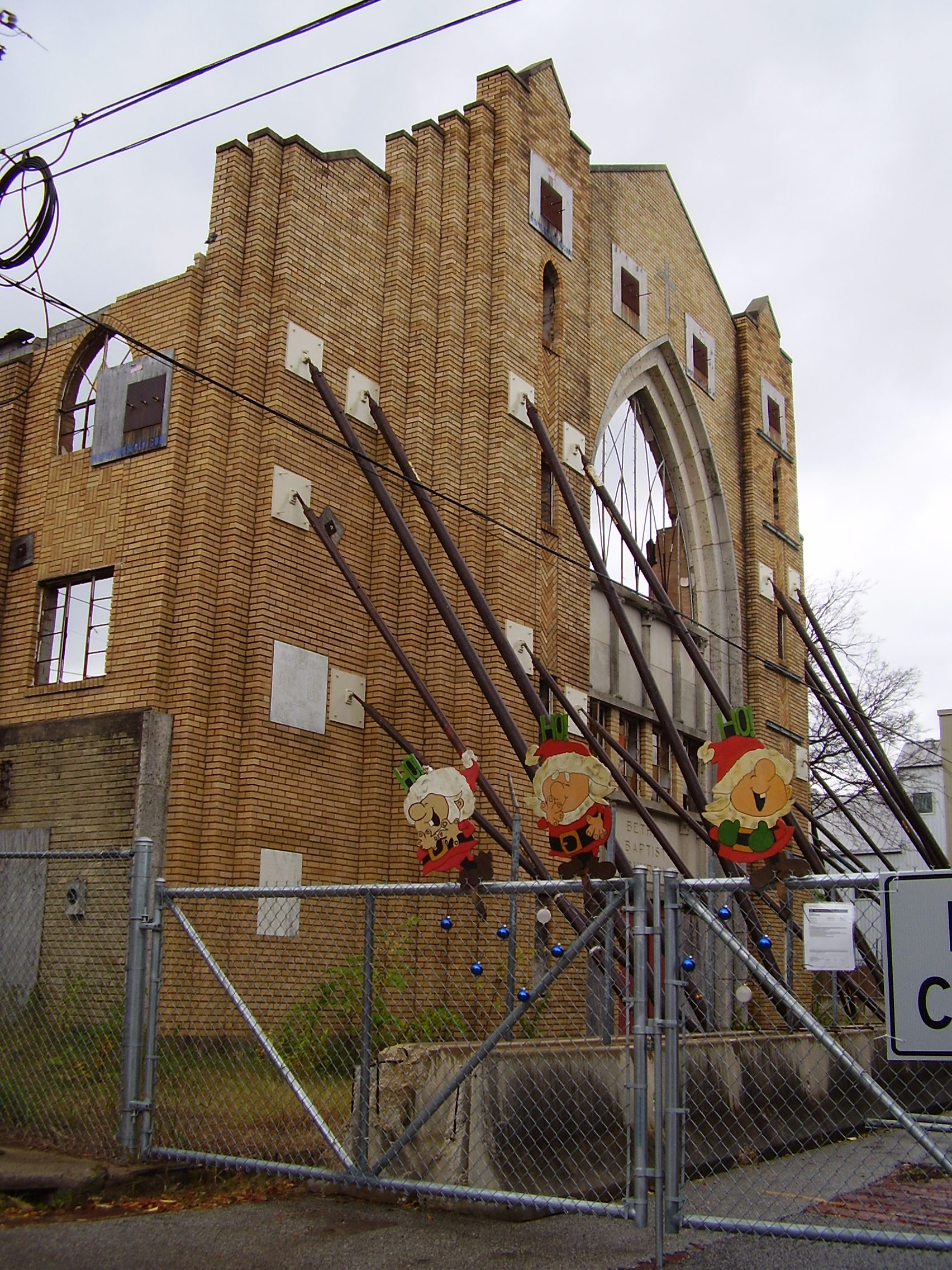
The remains of the Bethel Missionary Baptist Church

On Wednesday March 25, 2009 the City of Houston bought the remains of the Bethel Missionary Baptist Church, which received damage in a fire in 2005. The city plans to convert the church into a park. The city purchased the church, one of the oldest in Houston, for $350,000 of special tax increment re-investment zone money. The city planned for the restoration project to take two years. Prior to the city's purchase of the church, area residents feared that the church ruins would be demolished to make room for more townhouses. Since the fire occurred, the Bethel Missionary Baptist Church congregation relocated to a new building. Pastor Robert Robertson, the leader of the church, supported the city's purchase and restoration of the church facility. The church was founded by Jack Yates.

Rutherford B.H. Yates Museum Inc. owns six houses on ten lots as part of the Educational and Cultural Corridor Park. All of them are National Register of Historic Places houses, three have State Historic Land Marks, four are designated by the City of Houston as protected landmarks, and all properties have State Archaeological Trinomial registrations. The houses include the Rutherford B.H. Yates Sr. House, the former home of the son of Jack Yates, and currently the Yates Community Archaeology Lab and Yates Printing Museum. Most of the houses were designed by black architects and built by black contractors who were the freedmen or descendants of slaves. The J. Vance Lewis homestead at Andrews and Wilson includes the 1907 J. Vance Lewis House, named "Van Court," and built the house 1218 Wilson. Lewis, born c. 1860 became an attorney, named the house after himself. The Pauline Gray-Lewis, was his wife, a teacher and worked as a librarian at the Carnegie Colored Library. A relative, Isabella Sims lived at 1216 Wilson on the same homestead. The organization plans to turn the Lewis house into a Museum of Legal Professions & Educators. 1319 Andrews St., a house built in 1898 on the south side of Andrews Street, across from the Lewis homestead, was the residence of the Reverend Ned P. Pullum and Emma, his wife. Rev. Pullum founded a brick yard that was producing 20,000 bricks a day, three pharmacies, a shoe business, and donated to the building of a church and the first hospital for Blacks, the Union Hospital. The organization plans to convert it into a Health and Business museum. Antonio Tomasino Jr., a grocer, owned two buildings, built by black contractors, including the shotgun at 1514 Wilson and the workman's cottage at 1404 Victor. 1514 Wilson will become the site of the Archaeological Field School Lab. 1404 Victor, a workman's cottage built around 1900, will become a Barber/Beauty Shop museum.

== In media ==
A White American filmmaker named James Blue directed a 1978 film called "Who Killed Fourth Ward?", with most of the filming done in 1976, from July through September of that year. It was uploaded to YouTube.

== Notable residents ==
- Jack Yates - The house Yates occupied was originally in the Fourth Ward. It was later moved to Sam Houston Park and it was opened to the public on Wednesday December 11, 1996.
- Lenwood Johnson - An activist who campaigned to prevent the demolition of Allen Parkway Village and later to preserve the history of the Fourth Ward itself.

== See also ==
- African-American neighborhood
- History of the African-Americans in Houston
