= Emancipation Park (Houston) =

Park in Houston, Texas

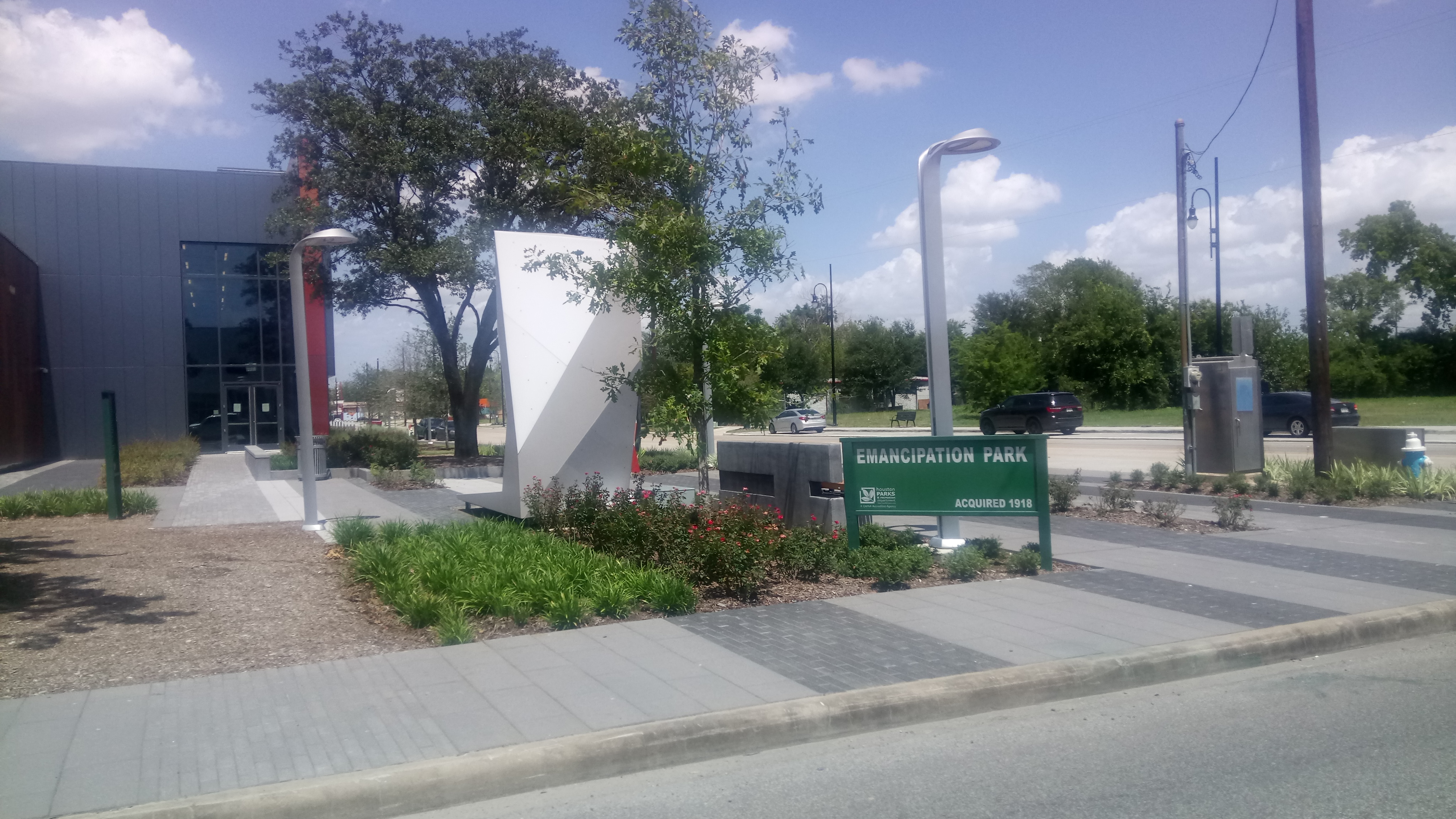
- Emancipation Park entrance and buildings
- Interactive map of Emancipation Park
- Type: Urban park
- Location: 3018 Emancipation Ave, Houston, Texas, USA
- Coordinates: 29.73578°N 95.36494°W
- Area: 11.71 acres (4.74 ha; 0.01830 mi^{2}; 0.0474 km^{2})
- Created: 1872
- Owner: Houston Parks and Recreation Department
- Manager: Emancipation Park Conservancy
- Historic Landmark
- Houston Protected Landmark
- HPLM No.: 07PL46
- Designated HPLM: 2007

Emancipation Park and Emancipation Community Center are located at 3018 Emancipation Ave in the Third Ward area of Houston. It is the oldest park in Houston, and the oldest in Texas. In portions of the Jim Crow period it was the sole public park in the area available to African-Americans.

== History ==
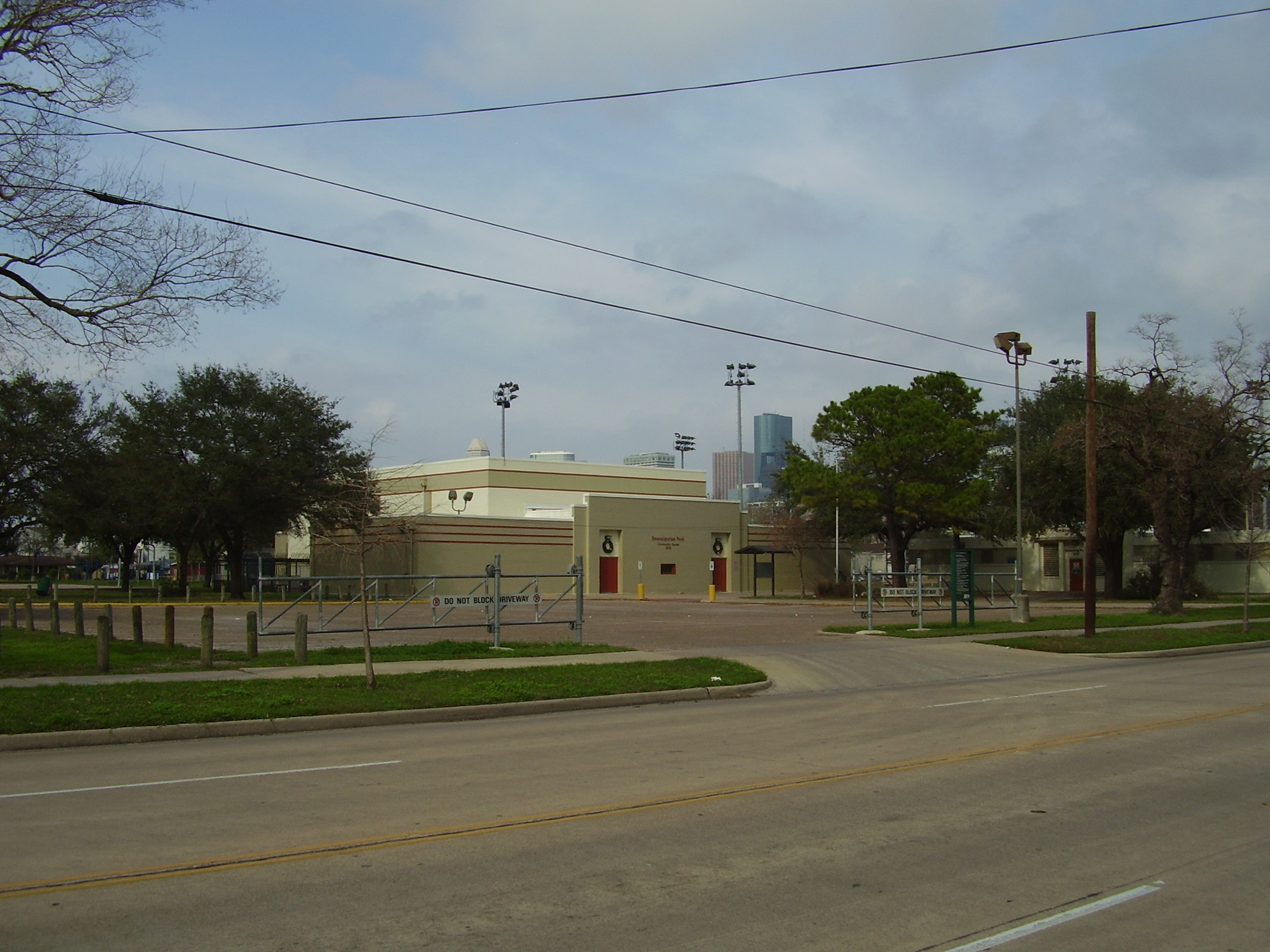
Emancipation Park (former buildings)

In 1872, Richard Allen, Richard Brock, Jack Yates, and Elias Dibble together bought 10 acres (4.0 ha) of parkland with US$800. The men, led by Yates, were members of the Antioch Missionary Baptist Church and the Trinity Methodist Episcopal Church. They did this to commemorate the end of slavery in the United States. As the owners lacked funds to keep the park open year-round, it was originally solely used for Juneteenth celebrations. The park received its current name in 1872.

The City of Houston received the park in 1916 as part of a donation; the city converted it into a municipal park in 1918. From 1922 to 1940 it was Houston's sole park for African-Americans, since the city government had declared its parks racially segregated in 1922. Many concerts, musical performances, and Juneteenth celebrations were held in Emancipation Park.

Mayor Ben Campbell appointed local real estate investor John Brown Bell as the city park manager for two years, which prompted more park development. During this period, the park constructed a recreation center, walk ways, restaurants, a swimming pool, and bathhouse, all designed by prominent Houston architect William Ward Watkin. The buildings have been used for after-school and summer programs for children, community meetings, and classes for youth and adults.

The park fell into disrepair in the 1970s after wealthier blacks left the Third Ward during the integration process. By 2007 it had stopped hosting Juneteenth celebrations.

In 2006, Carol Parrott Blue and Bill Milligan, natives of the Third Ward, formed "Friends of Emancipation Park" in order to revitalize the park. The board was established in March 2007. On November 7, 2007, the Houston City Council declared the park a historic landmark after it voted unanimously to do so. Carol Alvarado introduced the resolution.

In 2011, the city government planned to establish a capital campaign to install new facilities at the park. It spent $2 million in its own money and secured $4 million in funding from the local government corporation OST/Almeda Corridors Redevelopment Authority as well as $1 million in funding from the Texas Parks and Wildlife Department. In 2012, Mayor of Houston Annise Parker made requests for donations in order to secure additional funding. The renovation project had a cost of $33 million. Groundbreaking occurred on Saturday, October 26, 2013.

In 2014, the Emancipation Park Conservancy formed to restore, manage, and enhance Emancipation Park. In 2016, the group entered into a 30-year joint management agreement with the City of Houston to provide fundraising and maintenance for the park.

Also in 2016, the City of Houston Planning Commission passed a resolution to have Dowling Avenue, a street bordering Emancipation Park named after Confederate soldier Richard W. Dowling, renamed to Emancipation Avenue. In January 2017, Houston City Council voted unanimously to legally designate Emancipation Avenue.

In 2017, $33.6 million worth of renovations and new developments were completed to modernize the park. Also, Juneteenth and other black-centric celebrations were brought back to the park.

In 2019 it became a UNESCO Slave Route Project site.

== Composition ==
The community center includes an indoor gymnasium, a weight room, and meeting rooms. The park has an outdoor basketball pavilion, lighted sports fields, lighted tennis courts, a swimming pool, a playground, and picnic areas.

A swimming and recreation complex with an attached bathhouse was built in 1938 and 1939. William Ward Watkin designed the structure. The basketball court was added in the 1970s.

The 2010s renovated facilities were designed by a North Carolina black architect, Phil Freelon. Mimi Swartz of Texas Monthly described him as "arguably" the "most prominent" American black architect. The new facilities include a playground, a swimming pool, and a performance hall.

There is a historical marker that was dedicated in 2009.

== Note ==
- Some content is derived from Third Ward, Houston.
