= Christianity in Houston =

Most prevalent religion in the US city

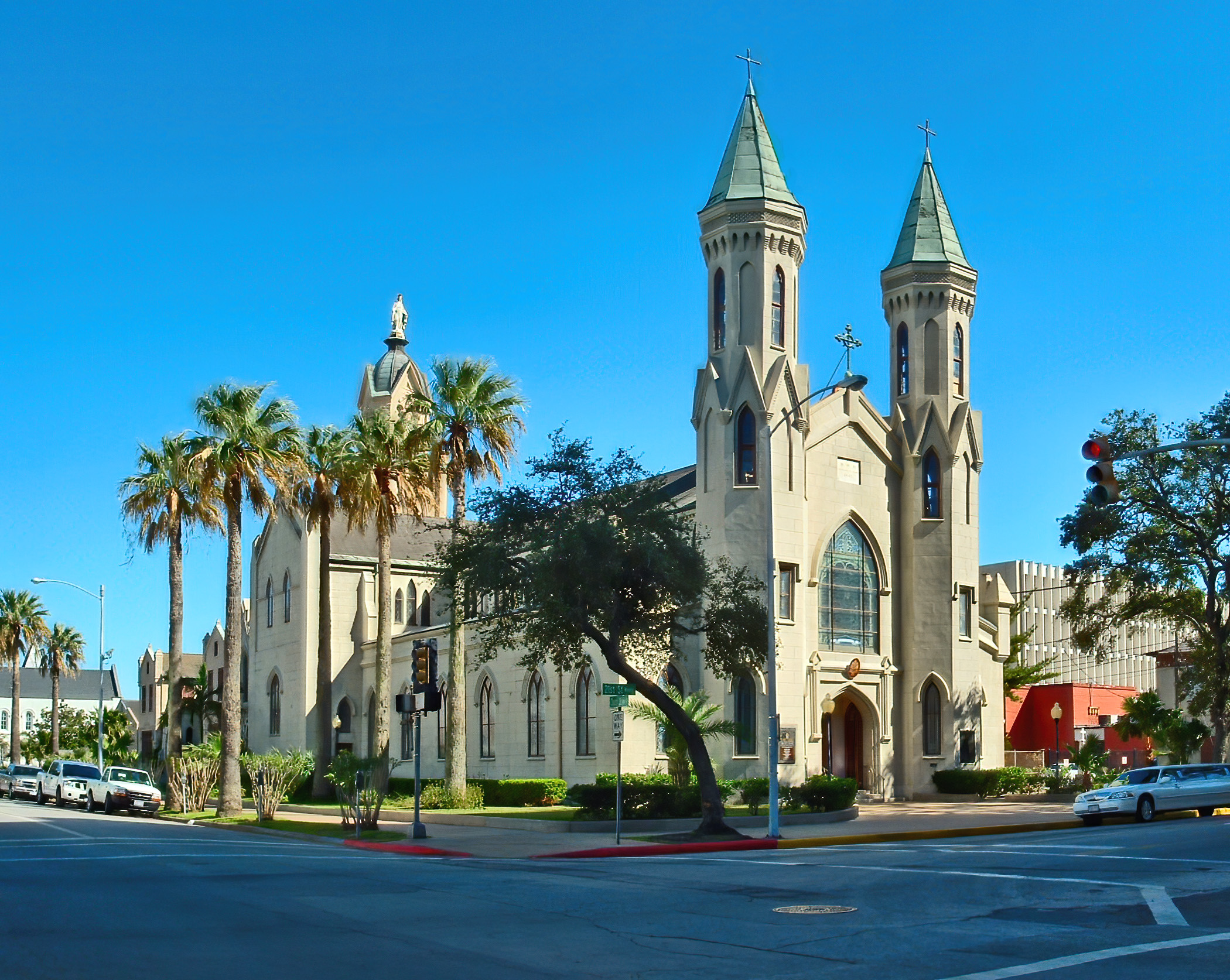
St. Mary's Cathedral Basilica, see of the Roman Catholic Archdiocese of Galveston-Houston

Christianity is the most widely practiced religion in the city of Houston, Texas. In 2012, Kate Shellnutt of the Houston Chronicle described Houston as a "heavily Christian city". Multiple Christian denominations originating from various countries are practiced in the city; among its Christian population, the majority are either Catholic, Baptist, or non/interdenominational.

Lakewood Church in Houston is the largest church in the United States. In 2010, it had 44,800 weekly attendees, while in 2000, it had 11,000 weekly attendees. In September 2010, Outreach Magazine published a list of the 100 largest Christian churches in the United States, and inside the list were the following Houston-area churches: Lakewood, Second Baptist Church Houston, Woodlands Church, Church Without Walls and First Baptist Church. According to the list, Houston and Dallas were tied as the second most popular city for megachurches.

== Catholicism ==
=== Roman Catholics ===
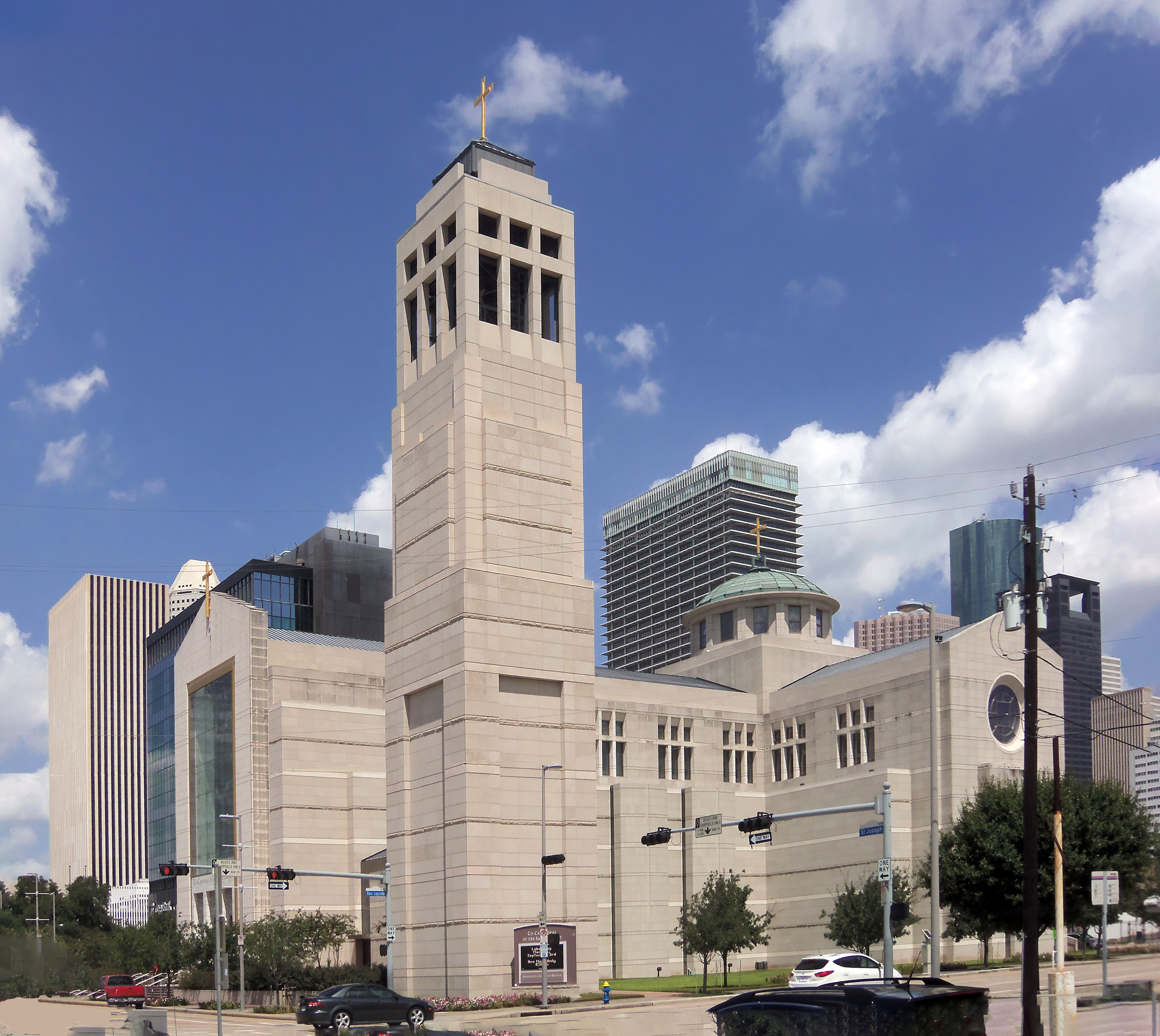
The Sacred Heart Co-Cathedral in Downtown Houston

The city's Roman Catholic diocese is the Roman Catholic Archdiocese of Galveston-Houston. The chancery of the archdiocese is located in Downtown Houston. The archdiocese's original cathedral church is St. Mary Cathedral Basilica in Galveston with a co-cathedral, the Co-Cathedral of the Sacred Heart, located in Downtown Houston.

The first Catholic church in Houston, St. Vincent's Church, opened in 1839. John Odin, a bishop arrived in 1841 to help establish it, and in the fall of 1842 the building, in the Second Ward, was fully built. This church converted into a parish catering to German Americans in 1871 when the larger Annunciation Church opened.

The city's first black Catholic church was St. Nicholas, located in the Third Ward.

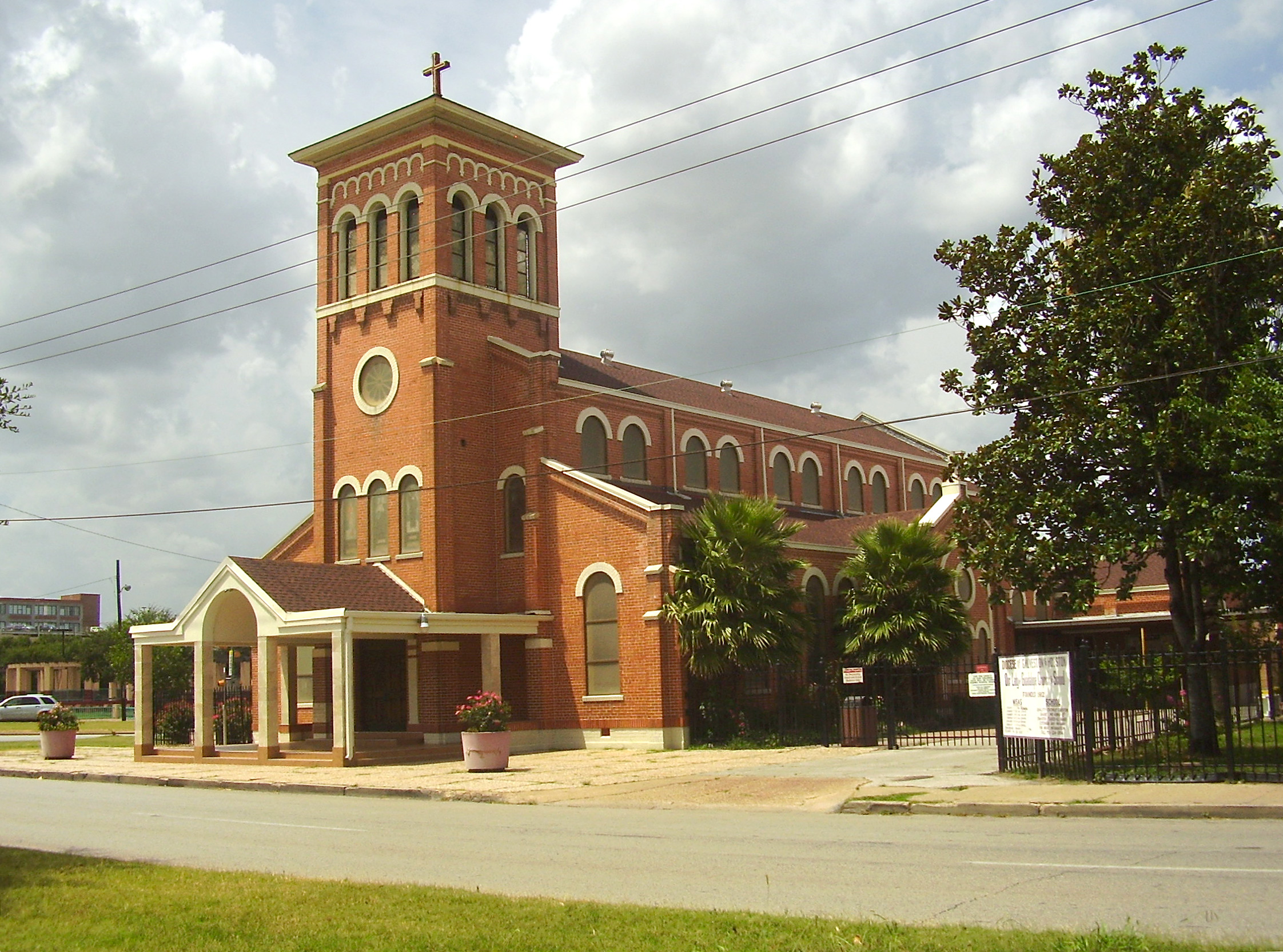
Our Lady of Guadalupe Catholic Church in the Second Ward

In 1910 there were no Mexican Catholic churches in Houston. Some Mexicans were excluded from attending English-speaking Catholic churches. Mexicans who did attend found themselves discriminated against. In 1911 the Roman Catholic Diocese of Galveston brought the Oblates of Mary Immaculate, a series of priests intended to minister to the Mexican population of Houston. In 1912 Our Lady of Guadalupe Catholic Church, the first Mexican Catholic church, opened. Due to an increase in demand in Catholic services, oblates established missions in various Mexican-American neighborhoods. The Roman Catholic Church established Our Lady of Guadalupe so that white people accustomed to segregation of races would not be offended by the presence of Mexican people in their churches. The second Mexican Catholic church, Immaculate Heart of Mary Catholic Church, opened in the 1920s. It originated as an oblate mission in Magnolia Park, on the second floor of the residence of Emilio Aranda. A permanent two-story building, funded by the community, opened in 1926.

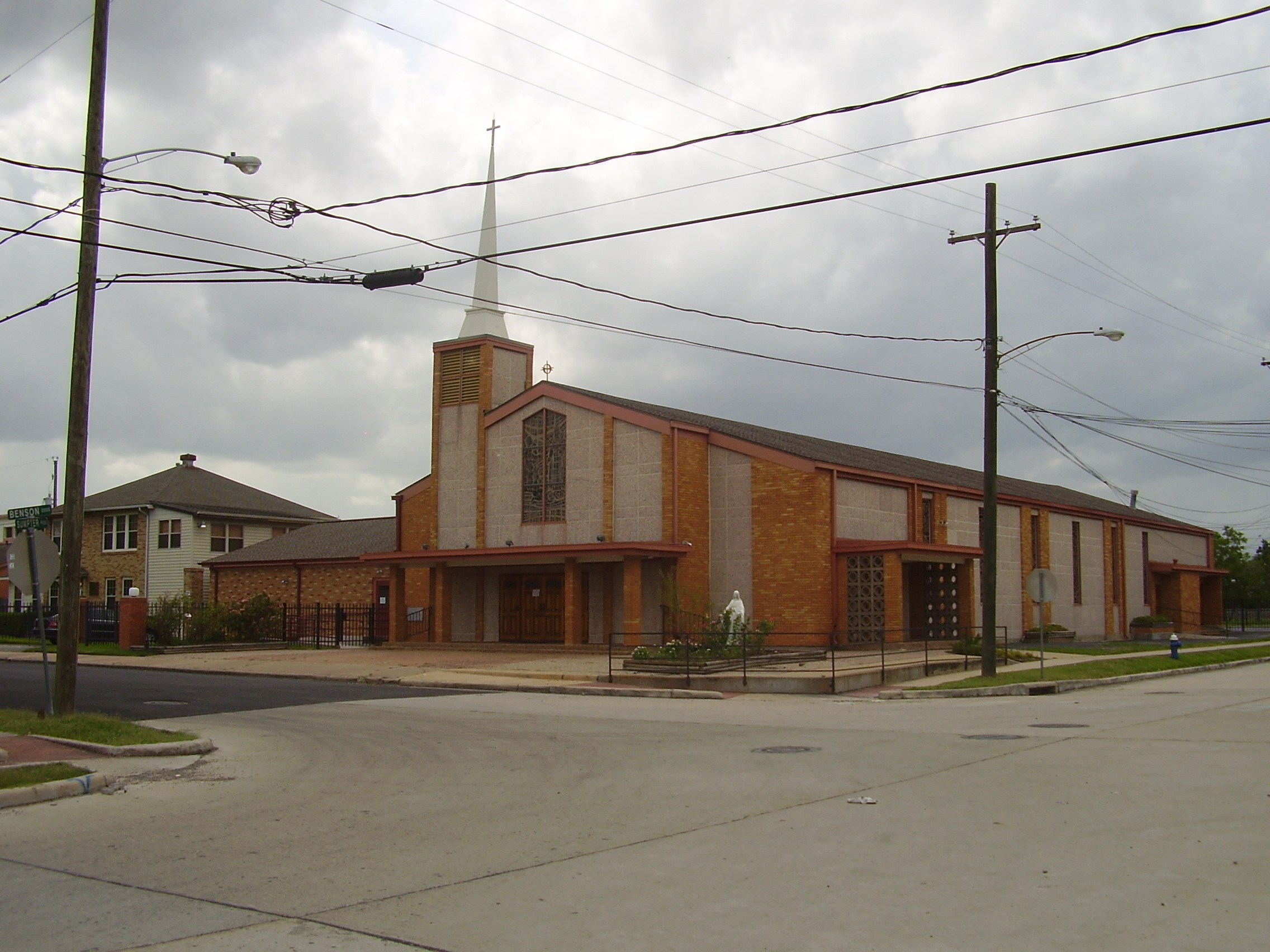
Our Mother of Mercy Catholic Church in the Fifth Ward

In the 1920s, a group of Louisiana Creole people attended the Hispanic Our Lady of Guadalupe Church because OLG was the closest church to the Frenchtown area of the Fifth Ward. Because the OLG church treated the Creole people in a discriminatory manner, by forcing them to confess and take communion after people of other races did so and after forcing them to take the back pews, the Creoles opted to build their own church. The Our Mother of Mercy Catholic Church in the Fifth Ward, Houston's second black Catholic church, was officially founded in June 1929.

The number of Black Catholics in Houston increased after the Great Mississippi Flood of 1927 affected rural areas in the Southern United States. Most of them moved to the Fifth Ward. Due to a perception of the Catholic Church being more favorable than Protestant churches to African-Americans, the Catholic Church in Houston increased in popularity with African-Americans in the 1930s. St. Anne de Beaupre in Sunset Heights, the third black Catholic church, named after the Basilica of Sainte-Anne-de-Beaupré in Sainte-Anne-de-Beaupré, Quebec, Canada, opened in 1938. By 2012 the church held Swahili masses due to it gaining African immigrant parishioners. In particular St. Nicholas has a group of Cameroonians in the congregation served by the Assumption Cameroonian Catholic Community, so it has services each month tailored to that group.

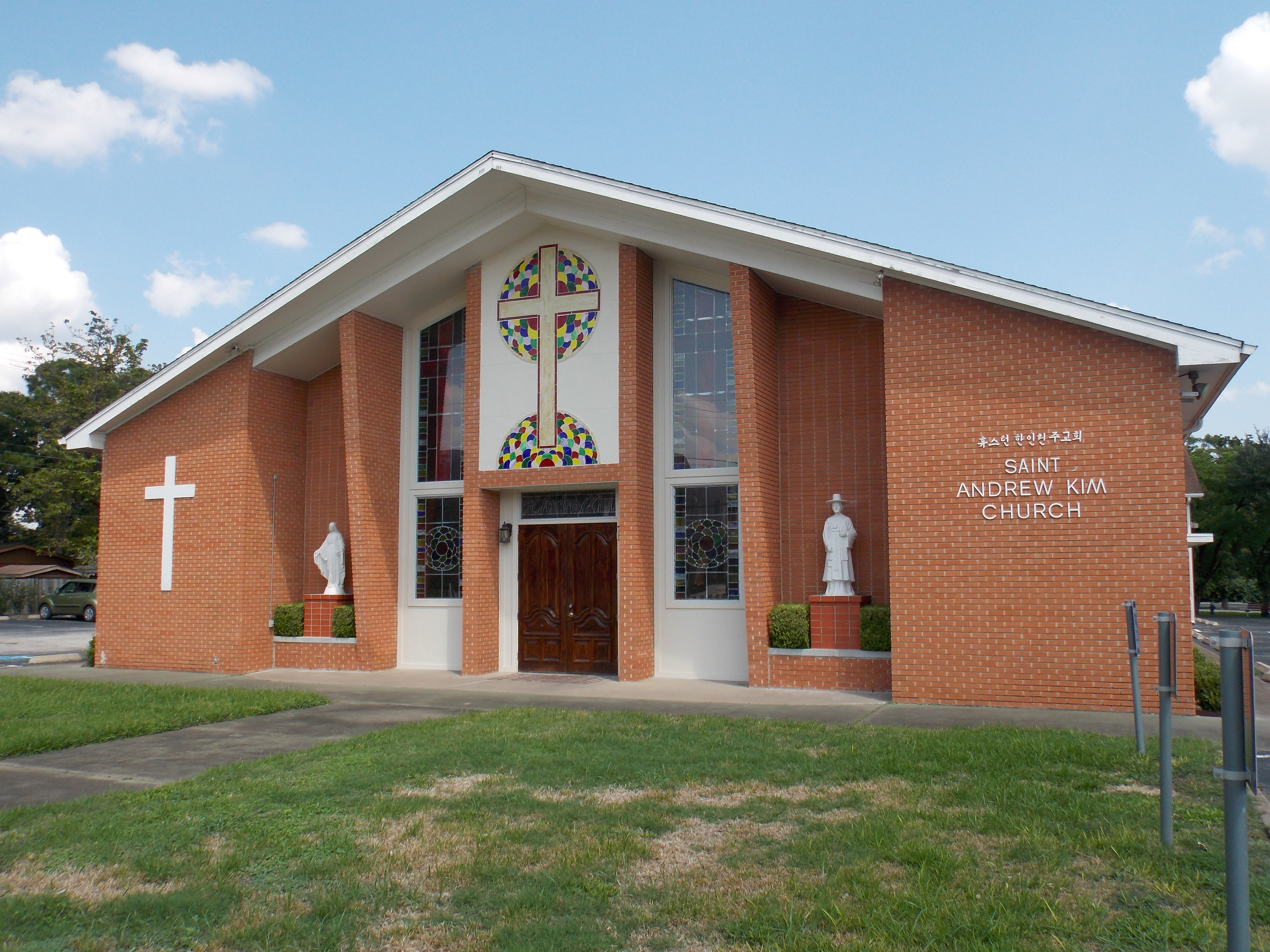
St. Andrew Kim Catholic Church (Korean: 휴스턴한인천주교회) in Spring Branch

In 1972 the Catholic church leaders and lay Hispanics in Houston participated in the Encuentro Hispano de Pastoral ("Pastoral Congress for the Spanish-speaking"). Robert R. Treviño, author of The Church in the Barrio: Mexican American Ethno-Catholicism in Houston, said that the event "stands as a watershed in the religious history of Mexican American Catholics in Houston". Treviño also said that Mexican-American Catholics "competed for cultural space not only with the Anglo majority, which included various groups of white Catholics, but also with a large black population and a Mexican protestant presence as well." St. Faustina Catholic Church, popular with Greater Katy's Venezuelan population, is in proximity to Cinco Ranch. It previously held its services at Joe Hubenak Elementary School, but in 2017 it moved into its own 1,600-seat building. It has worship services in Spanish.

The first wave of Vietnamese immigrants to Houston, occurring after the end of the Vietnam War, was mostly Catholic. In 1999 the Houston area had about 40,000 Filipino Catholics, about 30,000 ethnic Vietnamese Catholics, 350 Chinese Catholic families, over 1,000 Korean Catholics, and about 500 Indian Catholics. Vietnamese Catholic churches in the Houston area as of 2008 include Christ Incarnate Word Parish (Vietnamese: Giáo Xứ Đức Kito Ngôi Lời Nhập Thể), Holy Rosary Parish, Our Lady of Lavang (Giáo Xứ Đức Mẹ Lavang), Our Lady of Lourdes, and Vietnamese Martyrs (Giáo Xứ Các Thánh Tử Đạo Việt Nam). In 1999 there were four Vietnamese Catholic churches and five other churches with large numbers of Vietnamese people. In 1988 the Chinese Catholic church, Ascension Chinese Mission (美華天主堂), opened. The Korean Catholic church, St. Andrew Kim Catholic Church (Korean: 휴스턴한인천주교회), named after Andrew Kim Taegon, is in Spring Branch. There were no particular Filipino and Indian Catholic churches. On August 8, 2008, a bus with Vietnamese Catholics from the Houston area was traveling to a Missouri festival to honor the Virgin Mary and crashed near Sherman in North Texas. 17 people died.

The city has a Polish American church, Our Lady of Czestochowa Roman Catholic Parish in Spring Branch, established in the 1980s. At the time Polish immigrants who resisted Communist rule in that country arrived in Houston.

=== Maronite Catholics ===
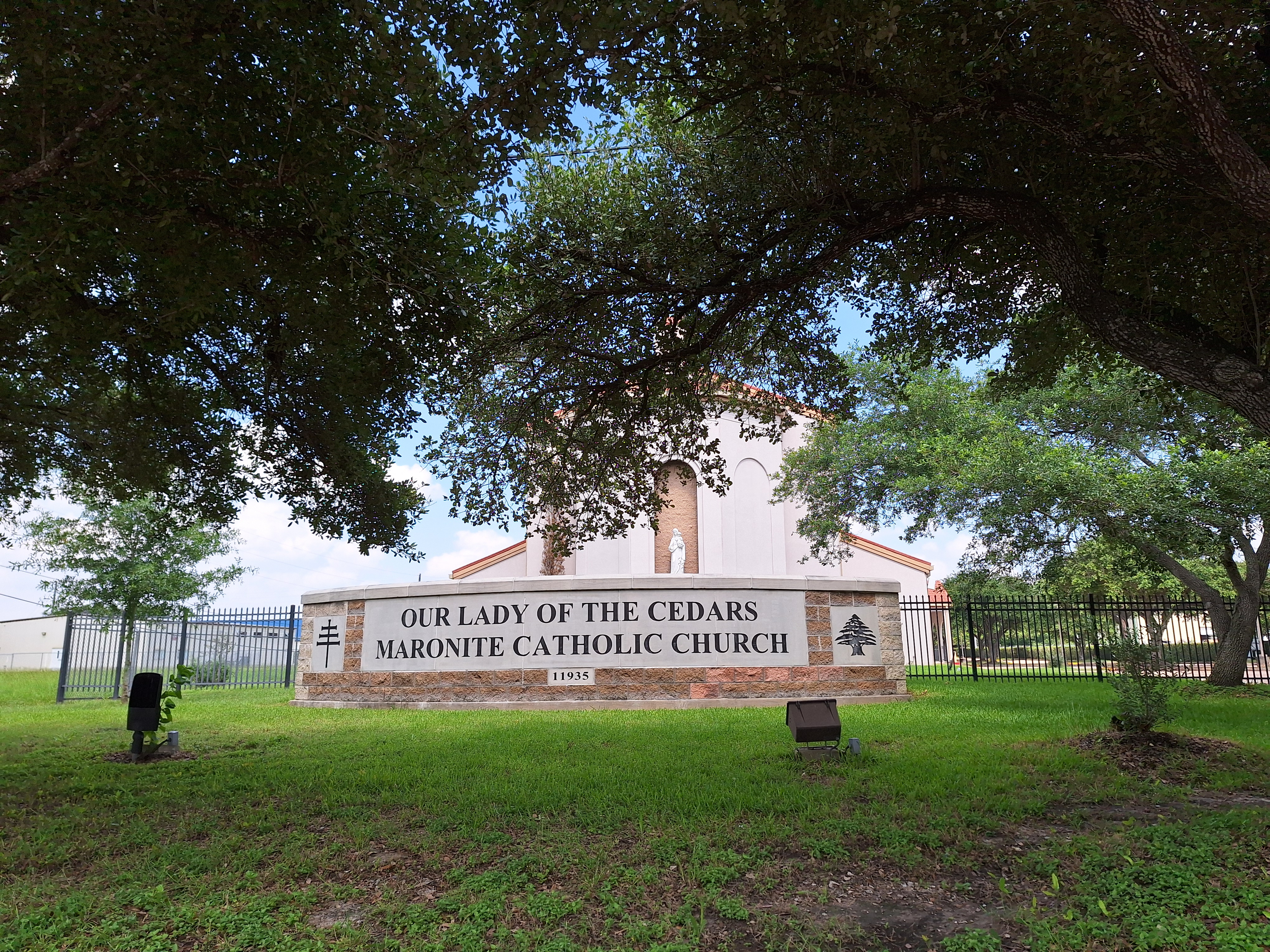
Our Lady of the Cedars Maronite Catholic Church

As of 2008 Our Lady of the Cedars Maronite Catholic Church has been Houston's only Maronite Church. That year, Christine Dow, a spokesperson for the church, stated that there were about 500 families who were members, and that the community, since the 1990s, had increased. Richard Vara of the Houston Chronicle wrote that in 1991 there had "only a handful of registered families" in the Houston Maronite church.

== Protestantism ==
=== Anglicans and Episcopalians ===
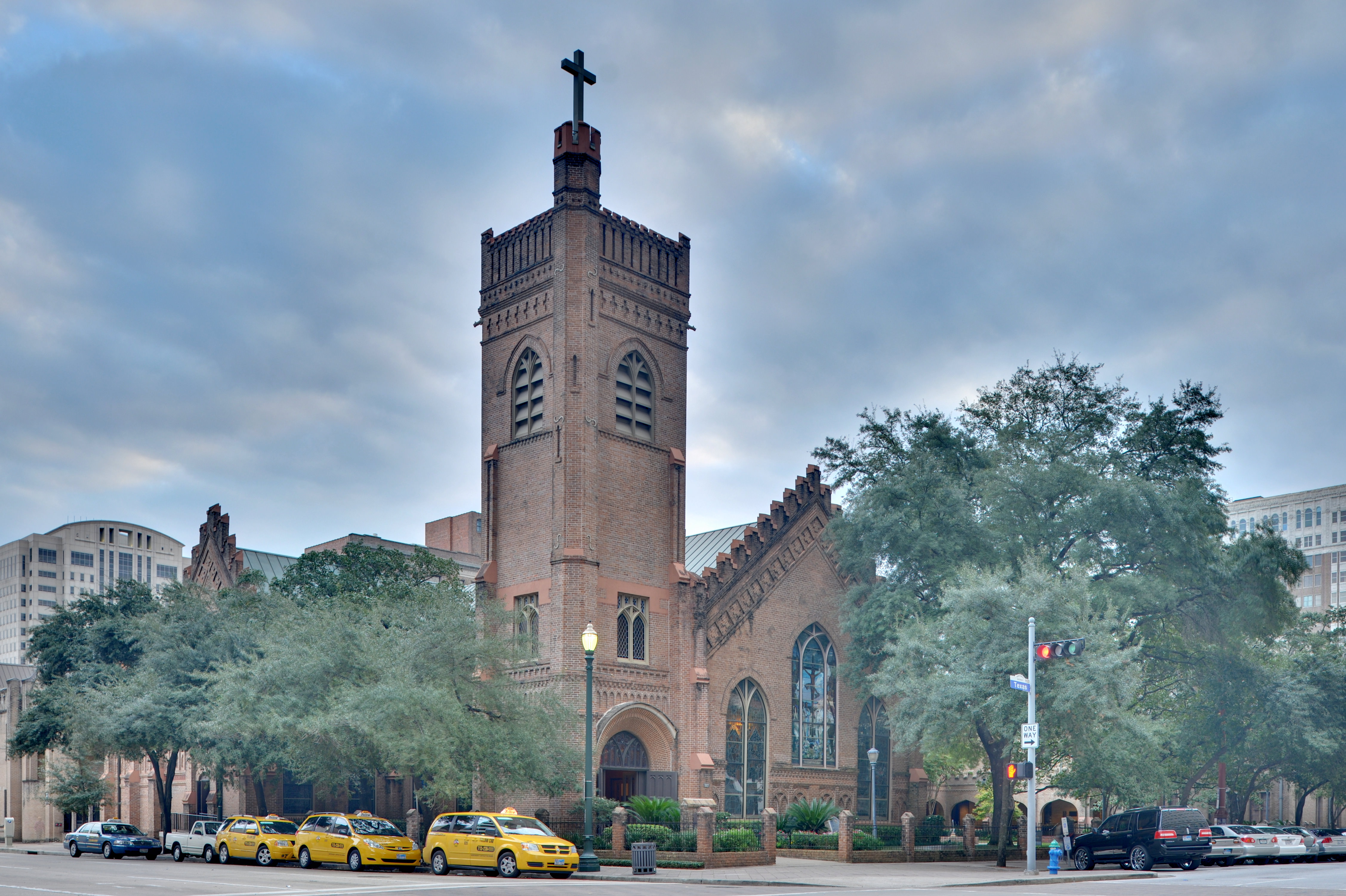
Christ Church Cathedral, see of the Episcopal Diocese of Texas

The Anglican-Episcopalian tradition is served by a multitude of communities affiliated with the Protestant Episcopal Church in the United States of America, and the Anglican Church in North America. Among them, the Episcopal Diocese of Texas within the Episcopal Church is the oldest Anglican or Episcopalian jurisdiction for the area. Within the Anglican Church in North America (ACNA), several parish churches of Greater Houston are part of the Anglican Diocese of the Western Gulf Coast.

Anglicans within the Anglican Diocese of the Western Gulf Coast of the Anglican Church in North America includes a number of parishes in metropolitan Houston. While The Episcopal Diocese of Texas is part of the world-wide Anglican Communion, the Anglican Church in North America is not.

St. Martin's Episcopal Church, founded in 1952, in the Tanglewood neighborhood in west Houston, is the largest Episcopal church in the United States with over 10,000 members. There are 36 Episcopal churches in Houston, including multiple Spanish-speaking and bilingual congregations.

=== Baptists ===
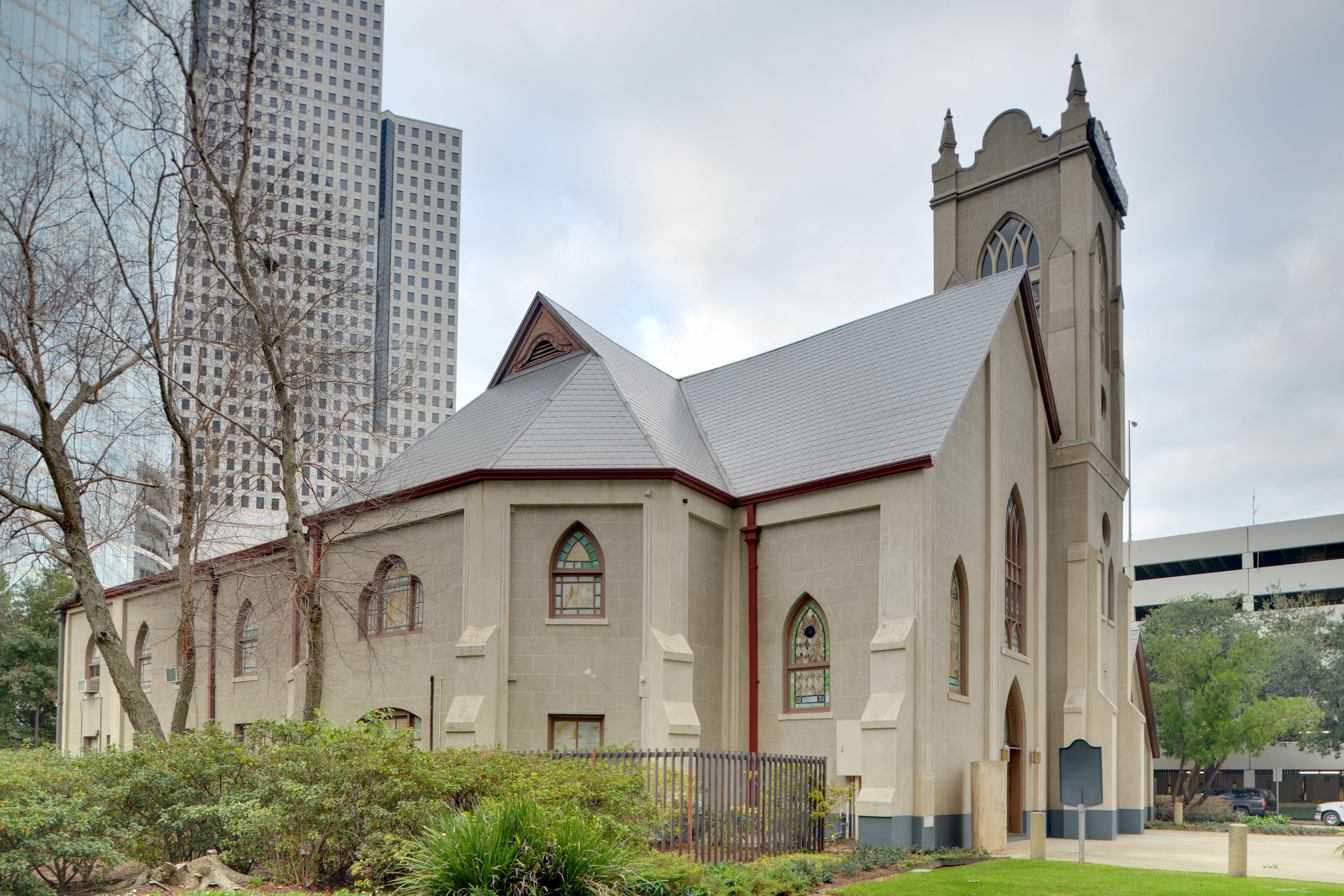
Antioch Missionary Baptist Church

Baptists are spread throughout numerous denominations for Greater Houston. Numbering 926,554 adherents as of 2020, the largest Baptist denominations operating in the city and metropolitan area are the Southern Baptist Convention through its Southern Baptists of Texas Convention and Baptist General Convention of Texas; the American Baptist Association, American Baptist Churches USA, Full Gospel Baptist Church Fellowship; National Baptist Convention USA and National Baptist Convention of America; and the National Missionary Baptist Convention.

The oldest predominantly African American Baptist church in Houston is the Antioch Missionary Baptist Church, historically a part of the Fourth Ward and now in Downtown Houston. Jack Yates once served as the pastor of this church. Good Hope Missionary Baptist Church, a black church, was originally established in the Fourth Ward in 1872 but moved to the Third Ward in 1981. In 2002 it had 1,500 members. Lonnie Smith was a leader in the congregation and filed the Smith v. Allwright case along with the church's pastor, A.A. Lucas, in the 1940s.

As of 2012 Second Baptist Church Houston, led by Homer Edwin "Ed" Young, is the largest Baptist church in the U.S.

=== Lutherans ===
The Texas-Louisiana Gulf Coast Synod of the Evangelical Lutheran Church in America serves Houston. Houston is also within the Texas District of the Lutheran Church–Missouri Synod. In 2001 Reverend Gerald B. Kieschnick, a native of Houston, began his role as the leader of the Missouri Synod Lutherans in the United States. In 2010 he lost his reelection bid. The 2010 election took place in Downtown Houston, at the triennial convention.

=== Methodists ===
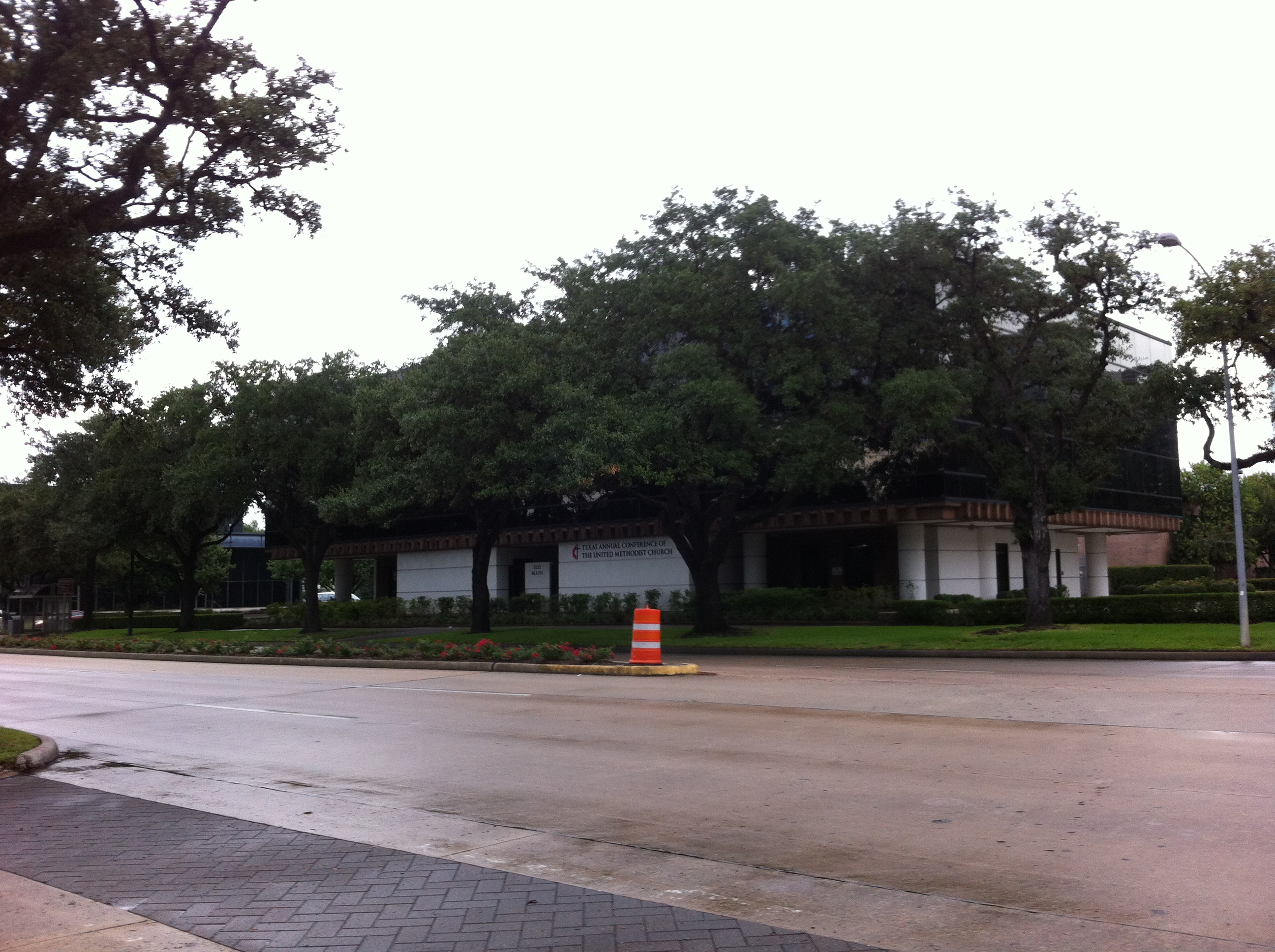
Texas Annual Conference of the United Methodist Church

Houston lies within the Texas Annual Conference of the United Methodist Church, which covers east and southeast Texas, although the African Methodist Episcopal Church and other Methodist denominations also maintain a significant presence within the area.

As of 2001 Windsor Village United Methodist Church is the largest Methodist church in the U.S.

=== Non/interdenominationals ===
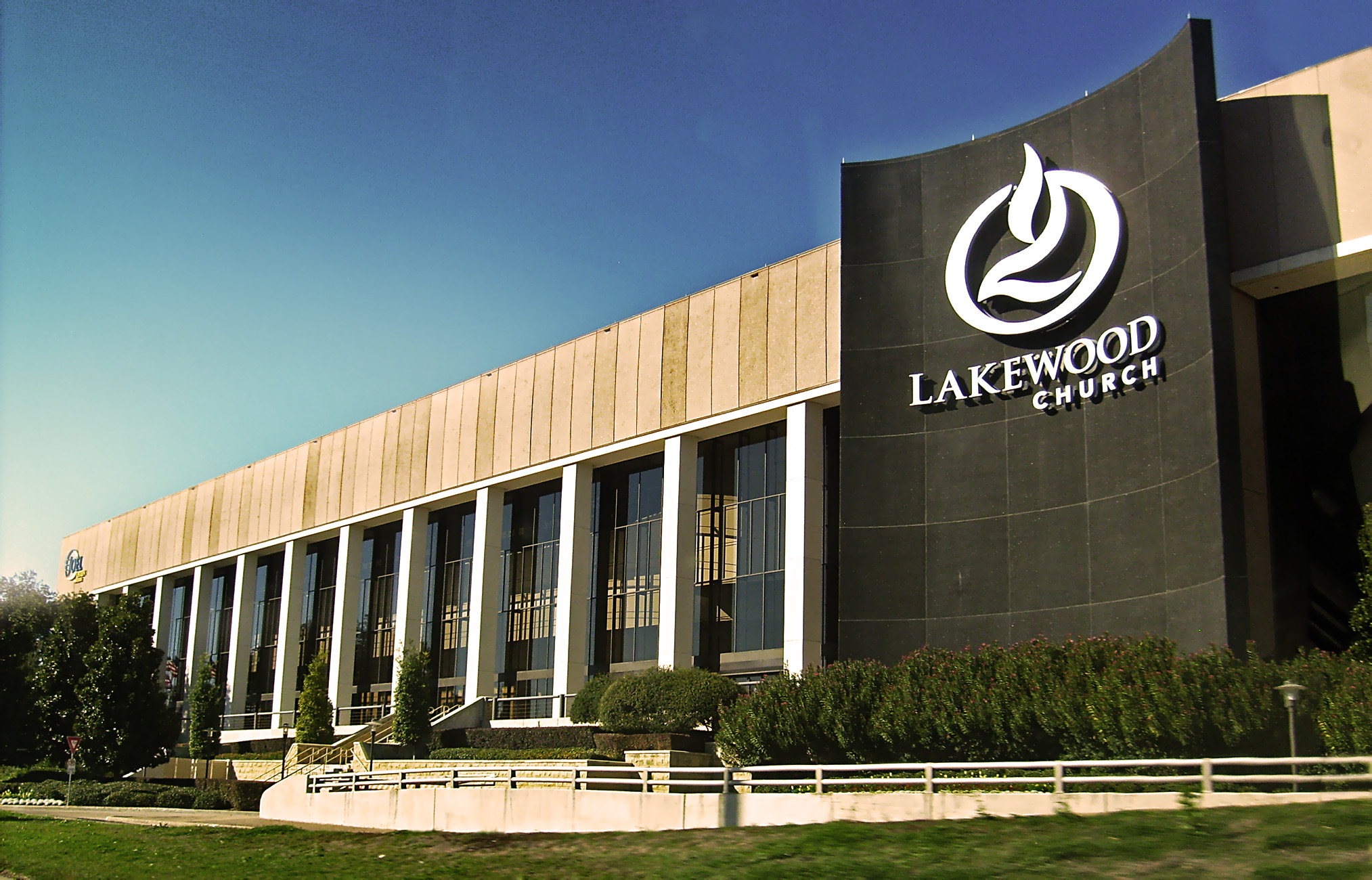
Lakewood Church

Non/interdenominational Christians are served by hundreds of churches, some formerly affiliated with denominational synods and conventions. Lakewood Church began as a Baptist church, but now identifies as non denominational. Woodlands Church is also nondenominational.

As of 2008 the oldest ethnic Korean church is the Korean Christian Church of Houston. In September 2007 Chul Chung, the senior pastor, returned to South Korea after he resigned. In 2008 there was discord among factions in the church and around 100 people were expelled from the church. The members who were suspended or expelled instead attended services at the Korean Senior Center.

=== Presbyterians ===
The Synod of the Sun of the Presbyterian Church USA serves Houston. The denomination's flagship First Presbyterian Church is a conservative congregation that disaffiliated from the larger body in 2016 and affiliated with ECO. The Presbyterian Church in America also has their own Houston Metro Presbytery, including the congregation of Christ the King Presbyterian Church Houston in east Spring Branch. Other Presbyterian denominations in Houston include the EPC, OPC, and, more recently, ECO.

Houston's three largest Presbyterian churches, Grace Presbyterian, Memorial Drive Presbyterian, and First Presbyterian Church are now members of ECO.

On December 25, 2001, the Korean Community Church in The Woodlands, with Presbyterian Korean-language services and non-denominational English services, opened. It opened to serve ethnic Koreans in The Woodlands, Conroe, Huntsville, Kingwood, and Spring.

== Church of Jesus Christ of Latter-day Saints ==
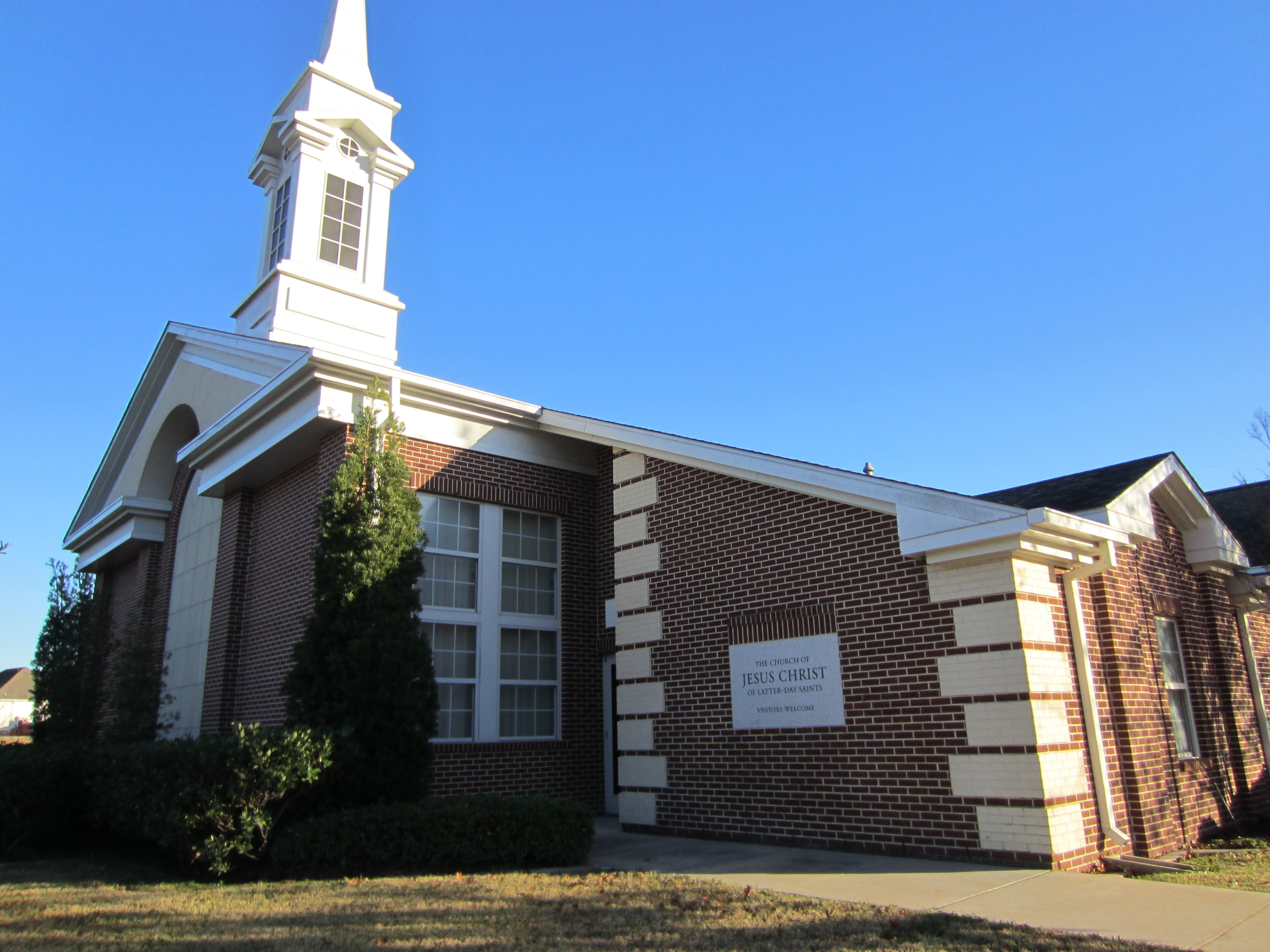
LDS church in northwest Houston

By 1918 members of the Church of Jesus Christ of Latter-day Saints (LDS Church), arrived in Houston. In 1921, the first formal congregation was established, and in 1933 the first meetinghouse was dedicated. The first meetinghouse built in Houston by the LDS Church was built on Calumet Street at San Jacinto in Midtown Houston in 1941. It is no longer owned by the church. The Houston area was originally part of the Texas-Louisiana Mission of the Church.

Today, there are 22 Stakes of the LDS Church that serve the Houston, Texas area. Stakes are geographical groupings of congregations comparable to, but smaller than, Catholic dioceses and typically include 6-12 congregations called "wards" or "branches", which meet in multi-congregational meetinghouses or chapels.

The church in Houston includes congregations that speak English, Spanish, Chinese, Vietnamese, and ASL. There are also congregations designated for single college-age adults (Young Single Adult) and for inmates (Correctional). One temple, the Houston Temple, lies outside the Houston area in unincorporated Harris County (with a Spring address), and serves the stakes in the area. It is the second temple built in Texas after the Dallas, Texas Temple, and one of the four currently operating in Texas today. It was dedicated on August 26, 2000, by President Gordon B. Hinckley. There are three missions of the LDS Church in the Houston area: the Texas Houston Mission, the Texas Houston East Mission, and the Texas Houston South Mission.

In 2011 Kate Shellnut of the Houston Chronicle stated that the LDS Church was increasing in size in the Houston area. On Saturday April 30, 2011 a new meeting house located on a 7-acre (2.8 ha) site in Sienna Plantation, was scheduled to open. The facility was scheduled to serve a 200-member English-speaking ward and a 200-member Spanish-speaking ward. Prior to the church's opening, Sienna Plantation-area church members attended congregations in the Sharpstown area of Houston and in Sugar Land.

As of 2016, according to church records, there were about 50,000 members of the church in the Houston area.

In 2018 church member Sam Young, from Sugar Land, advocated against bishops meeting one-on-one with children and asking them questions about sexual activity (the law of chastity). In response, an excommunication hearing for him was set up. Young stated that "Protecting children is more important than my membership in the church. I'm not going to shut up. That would be immoral on my part." He was excommunicated in September 2018.

== Eastern Orthodoxy ==
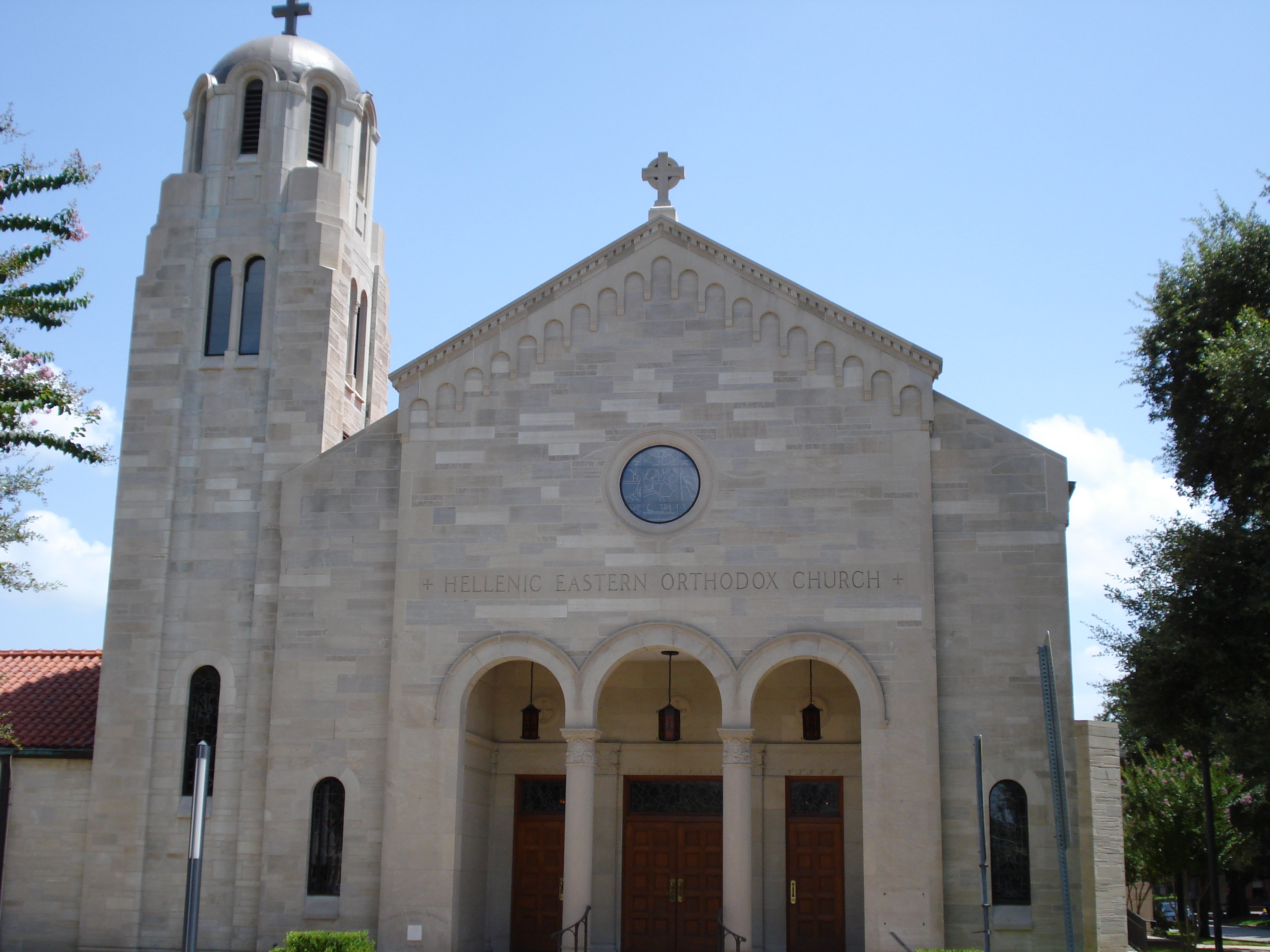
Annunciation Orthodox Church in Montrose, Houston

As of 2011, Eastern Orthodox churches in Houston are having growing memberships. Immigrants from Eastern Europe, the Middle East, and other countries have added to Houston's Orthodox population. As of 2011 in the entire State of Texas there were 32,000 people who actively attend Orthodox churches. In 2013 Father John Whiteford, the pastor of St. Jonah Orthodox Church near Spring, stated that there were about 6,000-9,000 Eastern Orthodox Christians in Houston.

As of 2013, the largest Orthodox congregations are Annunciation Cathedral Greek and St. George Antiochian. Orthodox parishes hold festivals such as the Greek Festival. Former District Attorney of Harris County Pat Lykos and the members of the Pappas family, operating Pappas Restaurants, are Greek Orthodox.

In 1861 the first Orthodox church in the Houston area, named after Saints Constantine and Helen, was in Galveston. The worshippers were in Galveston and, after 1911, in Houston, with the latter using the Galveston-Houston Inter-Urban Train. The priest, Father Theoclitos Triantafilides, was sent by Tsar Nicholas II of Russia. Nicholas II also sent funds to the church. Whiteford stated that those in Houston took the train to Galveston to attend services. Immigrants founded Orthodox congregations in Southeast Texas from 1908 to the turn of the 20th century. Immigrants came from the Arab world, Greece, Romania, Russia, Syria, and Antakya in Turkey.

=== Greek Orthodox ===
Houston is within the Greek Orthodox Archdiocese of America, Metropolis of Denver.

=== Russian Orthodox ===
As of 2010 St. Jonah Orthodox Church, located in an unincorporated area in Harris County with a Spring address, is the sole Anglophone Russian Orthodox church in the Houston area. The church began holding services in 1998. John Whiteford was the deacon and provided lay services. In 2001 Whiteford was ordained as an Orthodox priest and he became a reverend. Whiteford estimated that the church purchased its current property in 2006 and he stated that in order to purchase the construction of the new building, the church paid in cash. The ceremony to celebrate the completion of its current building was scheduled for Saturday and Sunday October 23–24, 2010. As of 2010 about 90 people attend this church.

Another church, St. Vladimir's Russian Orthodox Church, holds services in Slavonic.

== Oriental Orthodox ==
=== Armenians ===
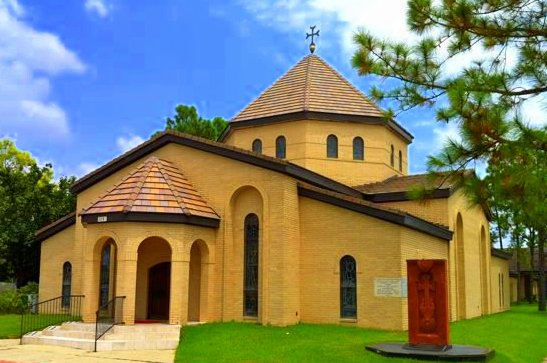
St. Kevork Armenian Church

St. Kevork Armenian Church, which was established around 1982, serves as the Armenian Apostolic Church facility in Houston. As of 2007 about 10% of the estimated 4,000-5,000 ethnic Armenians in Houston are active in this church.

=== Copts ===
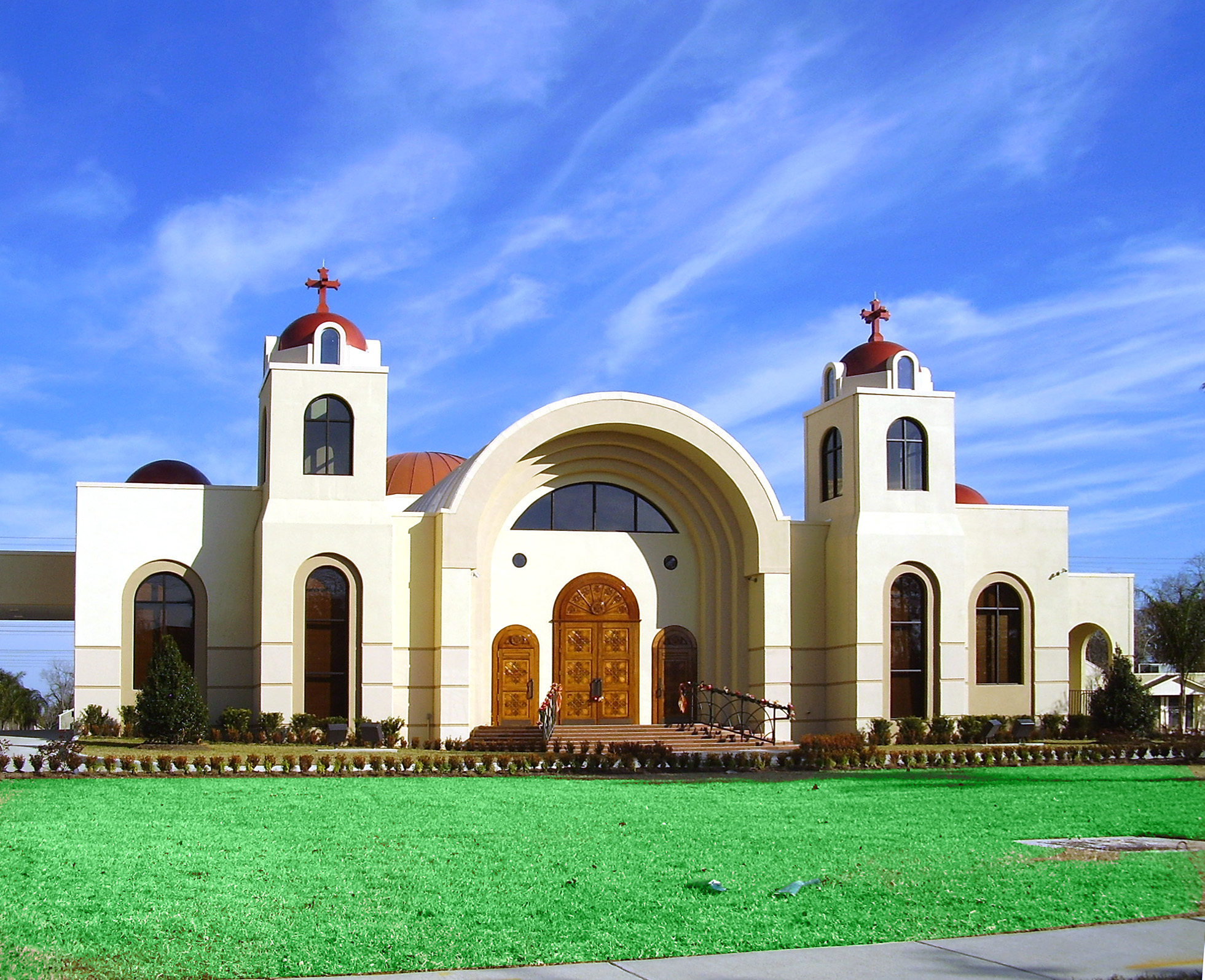
St. Mark Coptic Orthodox Church, Bellaire

Houston is within the Coptic Orthodox Diocese of the Southern United States.

As of 2004, there were three Coptic Orthodox churches in Houston: St. Mark Coptic Orthodox Church in Bellaire, the St. Mary and Archangel Michael Church in northwest Harris County, and the Archangel Raphael Coptic Orthodox Church in Clear Lake City. The St. Mary and Archangel Michael church began church services on July 25, 2004, had 200 families in August of that year, and had a cost of $2.5 million. The St. Mary and Archangel Michael church is the largest Copt church in the Houston area.

In the late 1960s there were far fewer Coptic families. Every month, a priest from Los Angeles flew to Houston and started a mass in a borrowed Orthodox church or in a private house. From 1968 to 2006 over 600 Copt families moved to Houston. Due to sectarian strife against Copts within Egypt, by 2006 the membership of Copt churches in Houston was growing.

In 2006 Gregory Katz of the Houston Chronicle stated that partly because many Copt church leaders are accustomed to anti-Copt attitudes in Egypt, those who come to Houston are not accustomed to speaking freely about their religious beliefs and therefore "do not mingle easily with the rest of the large Christian community in the Houston area".

After the 2011 Alexandria bombing, Houston Coptic churches cancelled their Coptic Christmas services.

=== Ethiopian Orthodox Tewahedo ===
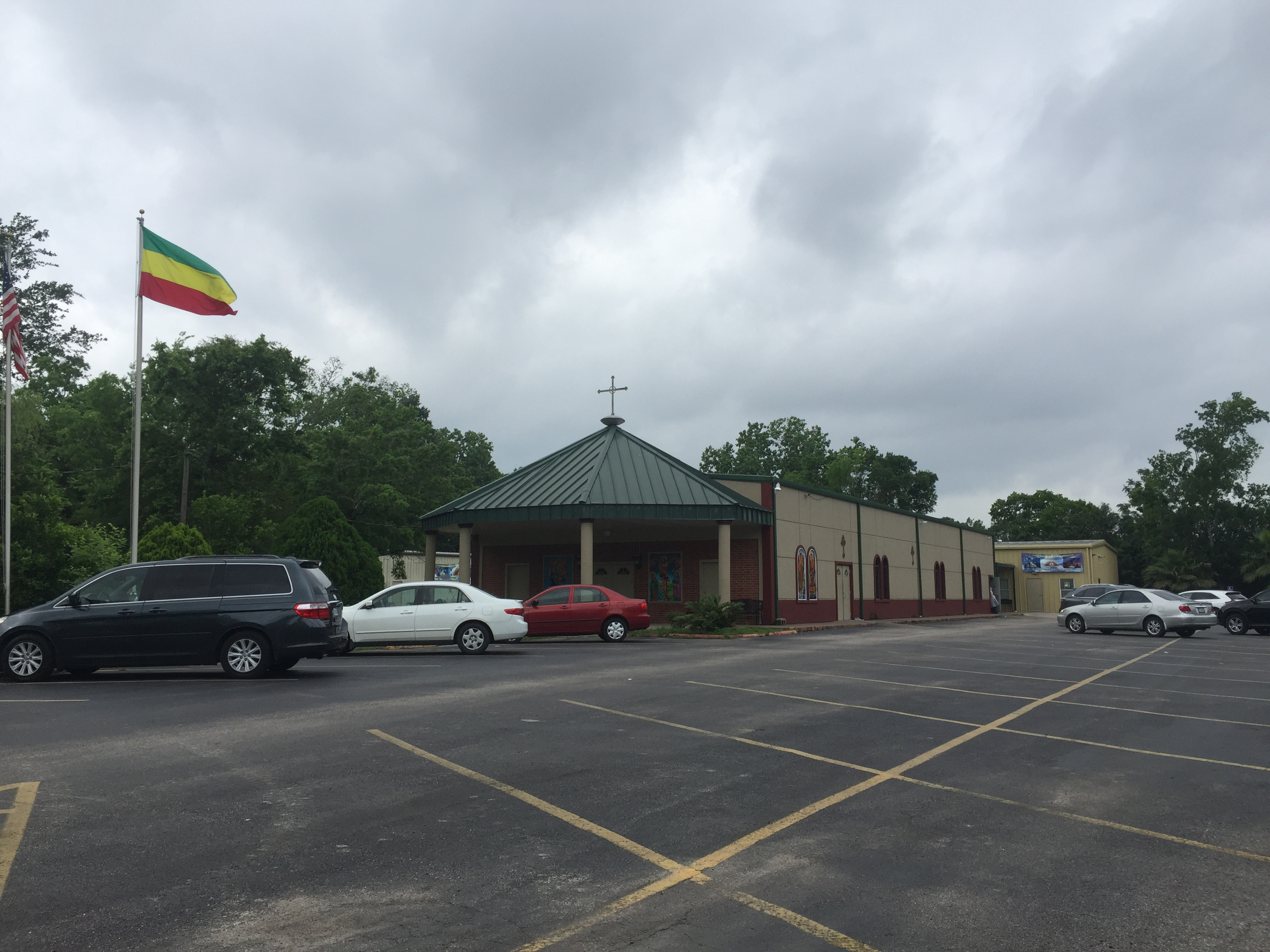
Debre Selam Medhanealem Ethiopian Orthodox Tewahdo Church in Fondren Southwest

Houston's Ethiopian Orthodox church is the Debre Selam Medhanealem Ethiopian Orthodox Tewahdo Church (Amharic: ደብረ ሰላም መድኃኔዓለም የኢትዮጵያ ኦርቶዶክስ ተዋሕዶ ቤተ ክርስቲያን Debre Selam MedhaneAlem YeItyopphya Ortodoks Tewahedo Bete Kristiyan; the name approximately means "Sanctuary of Peace and the Savior") in Fondren Southwest.

Prior to the construction of the church, those of the Ethiopian Orthodox faith worshiped at Coptic Orthodox churches. Mesfin Genanaw, a Houston Community College teacher who was one of the individuals who assisted with the building of the church, stated that in 1992 20 Ethiopian women who were attending a Coptic church planned the establishment of an Ethiopian church. In 1993 the group purchased a 2.5-acre (1.0 ha) site and a tent, and conducted church services in a tent. After fundraisers were held, in 1995 construction of the permanent church started, and the church later obtained an additional 5 acres (2.0 ha) of land. Genanaw stated in a 2003 Houston Chronicle article that there are an estimated 5,000 Ethiopians in Greater Houston.

=== Malankara Syrian Orthodox ===
The Malankara Orthodox Diocese of Southwest America is headquartered in Fort Bend County, Texas, near Beasley.

== Indian ==
In 2021, Fort Bend County had about 24 Indian churches.

== LGBT churches ==
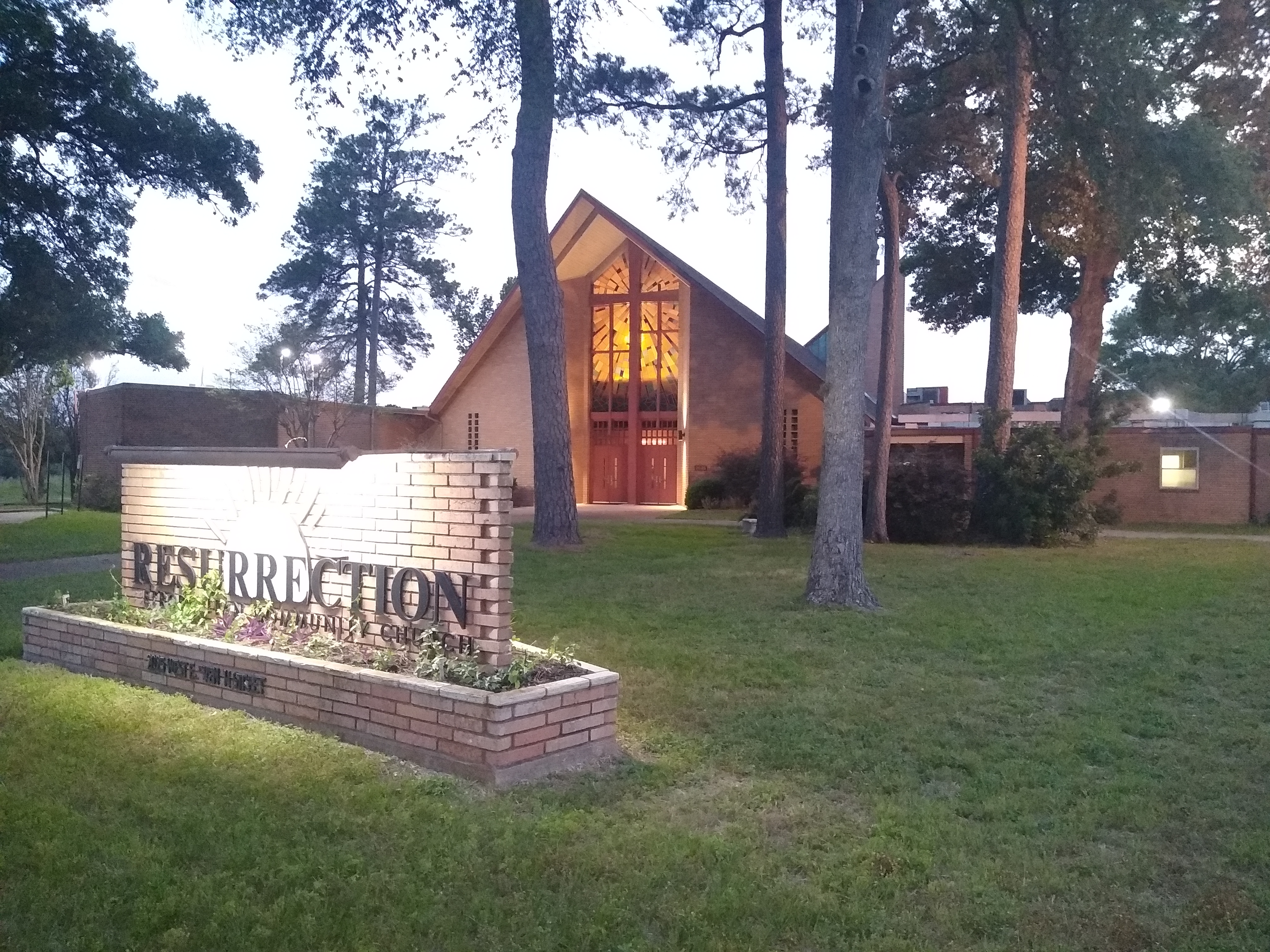
Resurrection Metropolitan Community Church

Some Christian churches accept members of the LGBT community. In 2008 Reverend Dwayne Johnson, the pastor of the Resurrection Metropolitan Community Church, a church in Timbergrove Manor, near the Houston Heights, stated that there were about 15-20 openly gay Christian clergy members in Houston.

Resurrection Metropolitan's main service group is the LGBT community. In 1980 the pastor was gay, and almost all of the congregation was LGBT. In December 2010 Reverend Harry Knox, a pro-LGBT activist, became the leader of the Resurrection Metropolitan. In 2011 Resurrection Metropolitan had 850 members.

In 1995, Grace Evangelical Lutheran Church began accepting LGBT members and became a "Reconciling in Christ" Lutheran church; it was founded in 1922. In 2008, Rene Garcia, a member of the Evangelical Lutheran Church in America (ELCA), stated that she estimated that 40% of the members identified themselves as LGBT, with many of them coming from other Christian denominations such as Missouri Synod Lutheranism and Roman Catholicism.

Over the years a number of Evangelical/Pentecostal LGBT affirming churches have also ministered to the Houston Community. Community Gospel Church began in the early 1980s and served the community until 2012, with about 150 members at its height. In 2012, Gateway of Hope Church was birthed as a Pentecostal/Word of Faith, Spirit Filled, Word Based, Jesus Centered fellowship meeting off of Dacoma Street and Hempstead Highway and is pastored by Pastor Sven Verbeet. Founded in 2010, Living Mosaic Christian Church pastored by Rev. Jason Wood meets at the Montrose Counseling Center.

In 2008, pro-LGBT activist Jay Bakker argued that Joel Osteen, pastor of Lakewood Church, should speak out in favor of the LGBT community, and invited him to join his group in a picnic.

There is one pro-LGBTQ church on the west side of the metropolitan area, First Christian Church (FCC) Katy.

== Religious leaders ==
- Kirbyjon Caldwell
- Daniel DiNardo
- Joseph Fiorenza
- Joel Osteen
- Jack Yates
- Homer Edwin Young

== Prominent adherents ==
- Michael Arceneaux (author of I Can't Date Jesus, which discusses his previous Catholic faith)
- Carol Vance (former District Attorney of Harris County)

== See also ==
- Religion in Houston
- Christianity in the United States
