= Bethel Baptist Church (Houston, Texas) =

Historic church in Texas, United States

- U.S. National Register of Historic Places
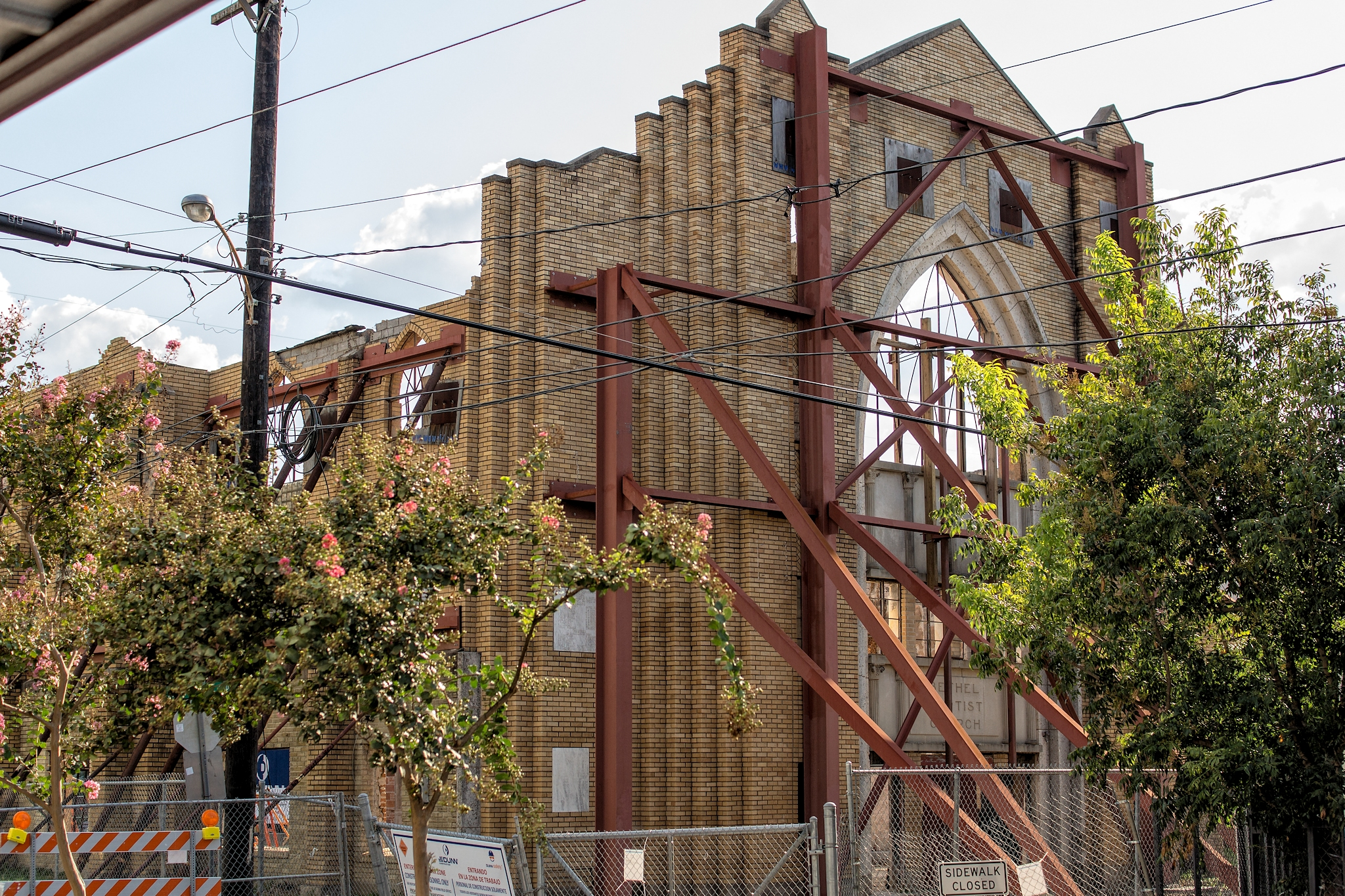

- Location within Texas Location within the United States
- Location: 801 Andrews, Houston, Texas
- Coordinates: 29°45′20″N 95°22′34″W
- Area: less than one acre
- Built: 1923
- Architect: Blount, John L.; Thomas, James M.
- Architectural style: Late Gothic Revival
- NRHP reference No.: 97001626
- Added to NRHP: January 16, 1998

Bethel Baptist Church is a historic Baptist church building at 801 Andrews in the Fourth Ward, Houston, Texas.

The Late Gothic Revival building was constructed in 1923 and added to the National Register of Historic Places in 1998.

== History ==
Bethel Baptist Church is home to one of Houston’s most significant and prominent African American congregations in Houston, Texas. The church is the second and last organized by the Reverend John (Jack) H. Yates (1828-1897), an early leader of Houston's African American community. Reverend Jack Yates pastored Antioch Baptist Church through about 1890 before the congregation divided. On October 16, 1891, Yates and a small number of parishioners left Antioch, and organized Bethel. The church was in Freedmen's Town, a post-Civil War Houston neighborhood founded by freed slaves, on 801 Andrews Street, Houston, Texas.

The original Bethel Church building was constructed in 1889 as a haven for former slaves and was entirely constructed of wood. Built by the Reverend Jack Yates, the plot was located in Houston's Freedmantown district. The original structure was destroyed in the Great Storm of 1900. Between 1900 and 1920, a second church structure was erected on top of the remains but it too was later destroyed. Twenty three years later, the church was reconstructed for a third and final time.

Pastors have included Reverend Ned P. Pullum (1862-1927), Reverend John Jason Blackshear (1897-1907), Reverend John Edward Knox (1877-1937), Reverend Christopher Columbus Harper (1884-1970), Reverend James R. Burdett (1878-1946), and Reverend Will Henry Dudley (1900-2001).

After the resignation of Dr. W. H. Dudley, Reverend Dr. Melrose Alpha Nimmo (1919-1999) became the 8th pastor of Bethel. In 1971, the church moved to 5530 Selinsky Road. The church paid off the mortgage in 1978 and began building a sanctuary and a gymnatorium. The church was renamed to Bethel Institutional Missionary Baptist Church in 1983.

In 1997, the last church service was held in the building, after which it was abandoned. On January 24, 2005, a fire destroyed the interior of the church, leaving only the exterior brickwork intact. In 2009, the church was sold to the City of Houston. Soon thereafter, the city erected steel supports and a concrete floor to preserve the building.

The city purchased the church, one of the oldest in Houston, for $350,000 of special tax increment re-investment zone money. The city planned for the restoration project to take two years. Prior to the city's purchase of the church, area residents feared that the church ruins would be demolished to make room for more townhouses. Since the fire occurred, the Bethel Missionary Baptist Church congregation relocated to a new building. Pastor Robert Robertson, the leader of the church, supported the city's purchase and restoration of the church facility.
