= Jack Yates =

American Baptist minister

- Born: John Henry Yates; July 11, 1828; Gloucester County, Virginia
- Died: December 22, 1897 (aged 69); Houston, Texas
- Occupation: Minister
- Known for: Antioch Baptist Church, Houston; Emancipation Park, Houston
- Notable work: Jack Yates House (Sam Houston Park, Houston)

John Henry "Jack" Yates (July 11, 1828 – December 22, 1897) was an American freedman, minister, and community leader. Born enslaved in Gloucester County, Virginia, on July 11, 1828, Yates was taught to read at an early age by his enslaver's child. He married Harriet Willis, who was enslaved on a neighboring farm. When her enslaver moved his plantation to Texas to avoid emancipation, Yates, then a free man, asked to be re-enslaved in order to stay with his family. He joined his family in Matagorda County, Texas, until their emancipation in 1865. The family then relocated to Houston, where he helped establish Freedman's Town, purchased property, and began ministering to the community. In 1868, Yates was named the first full-time preacher of the Antioch Missionary Baptist Church, Houston's first Black baptist church. As a community leader, Yates organized Houston Academy, now Booker T. Washington High School; Bethel Baptist Church; and Houston's Emancipation Park. He died in 1897. Yates' original Houston home, the Jack Yates House, was donated to Houston's Heritage Society and first opened to the public in 1996.

== Early life ==
Yates was born on July 11, 1828, in Gloucester County, Virginia to Robert and Rachel Yates, who were both enslaved. When Rachel became the caregiver to her enslaver's child, the child taught Yates to read. Yates would stash reading material when he went to work in the fields and would sneak out at night to read it. He also began attending religious gatherings of enslaved people.

Yates' enslaver brought Yates on business trips where Yates learned financial basics that later enabled him to purchase his own freedom. He met and married Harriet Willis, who was enslaved on a neighboring farm.

=== Relocation to Texas ===
Following the Emancipation Proclamation in 1863, Willis's enslaver moved his plantation to Matagorda County, Texas. Yates, a free man at the time, convinced Willis's enslaver to re-enslave him so that he would not be separated from his wife and three children.

Yates and his family relocated to Galveston, Texas, and were there on June 19, 1865, when General Gordon Granger issued General Order No. 3. Yates's enslavers presented the family with two options: Stay and work for free, or leave without resistance. Yates and his family chose to leave.

=== Freedom and move to Houston ===
They relocated to Houston, Texas, where Yates became a drayman. As one of the first Black freedmen in the city, he helped establish Freedman's Town, now Houston's Fourth Ward. In 1869, less than five years after his emancipation, Yates purchased property on Andrews Street where he built and designed the first two-story house in Black Houston.

== Ministry ==
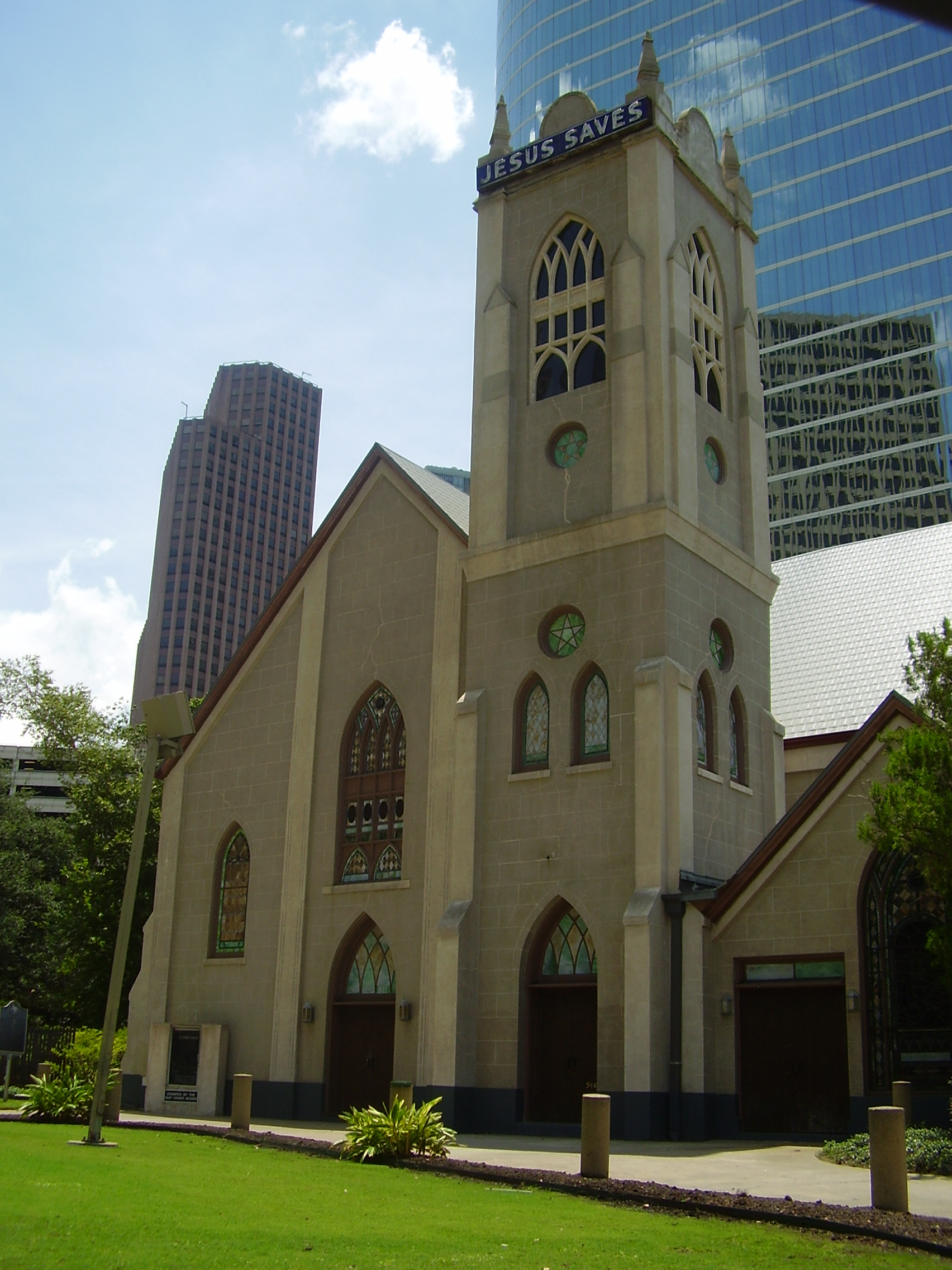
Antioch Missionary Baptist Church

On evenings and weekends, Yates preached throughout the community and conducted "horseback ministry" for Black communities within 100 miles of Houston. He began receiving attention from visiting missionaries for his literacy and ability to teach and preach.

In January 1866, a group of freedmen, with help from missionaries from the First Baptist and German Baptist churches, built a structure that would become the first worship space of the Antioch Missionary Baptist Church. Yates was ordained in 1868 and named the first full-time preacher of the church, which was Houston's first Black Baptist church. There, he taught community members about personal finances, literacy, carpentry and other skills.

Yates organized Houston Academy, now Booker T. Washington High School, in 1885 or 1886. He left Antioch in 1891 to establish the Bethel Baptist Church.

== Emancipation Park ==
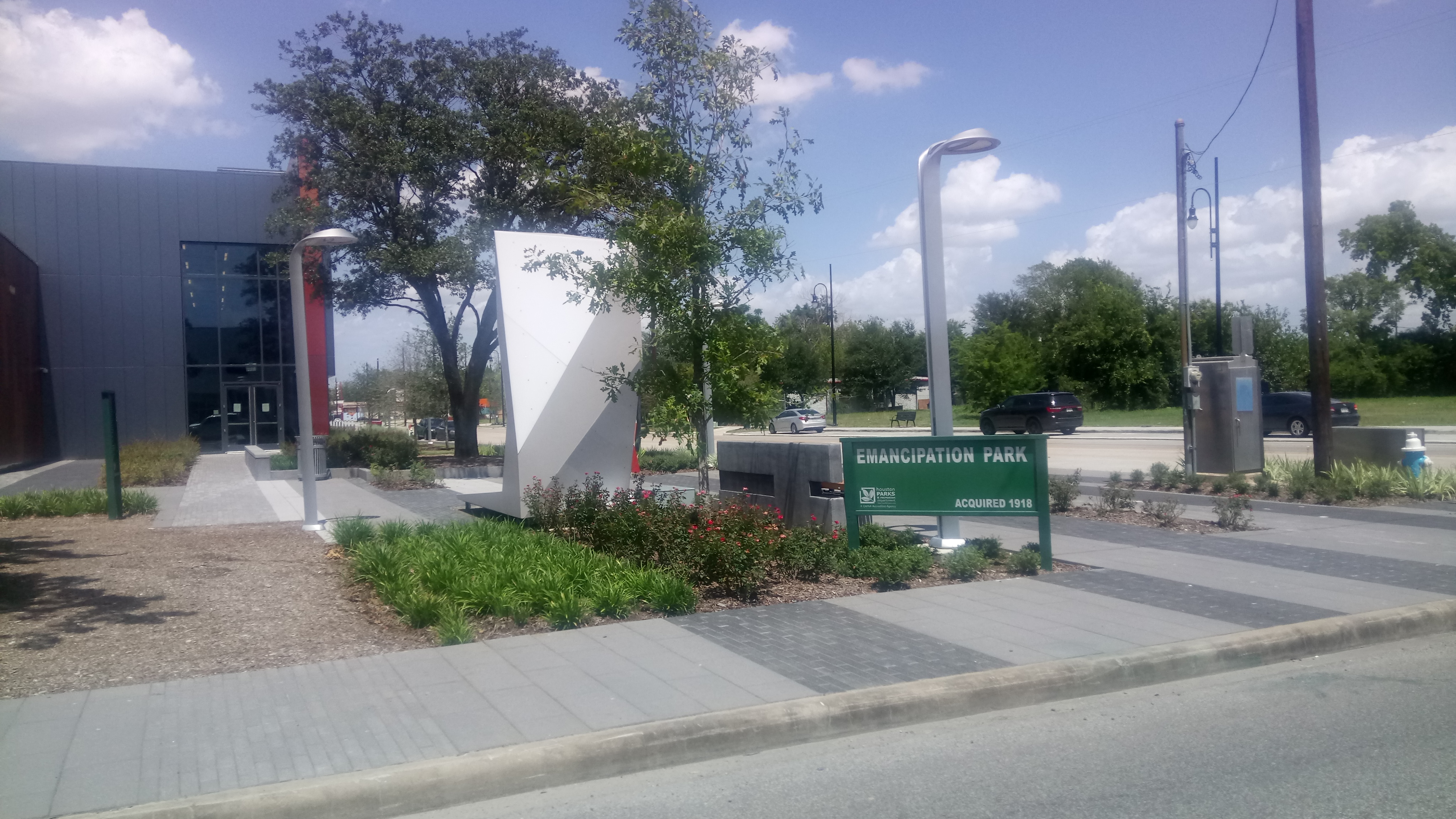
Emancipation Park in 2017

In 1872, while Yates was still at Antioch Missionary Baptist, the church partnered with Trinity Methodist Episcopal Church in Houston to purchase ten acres of land on Dowling Street. The intent was to provide a space for the Black community to celebrate Juneteenth. Located on what was formerly Dowling Street (now Emancipation Avenue), Emancipation Park was the first public park in Texas.

== Second marriage and death ==
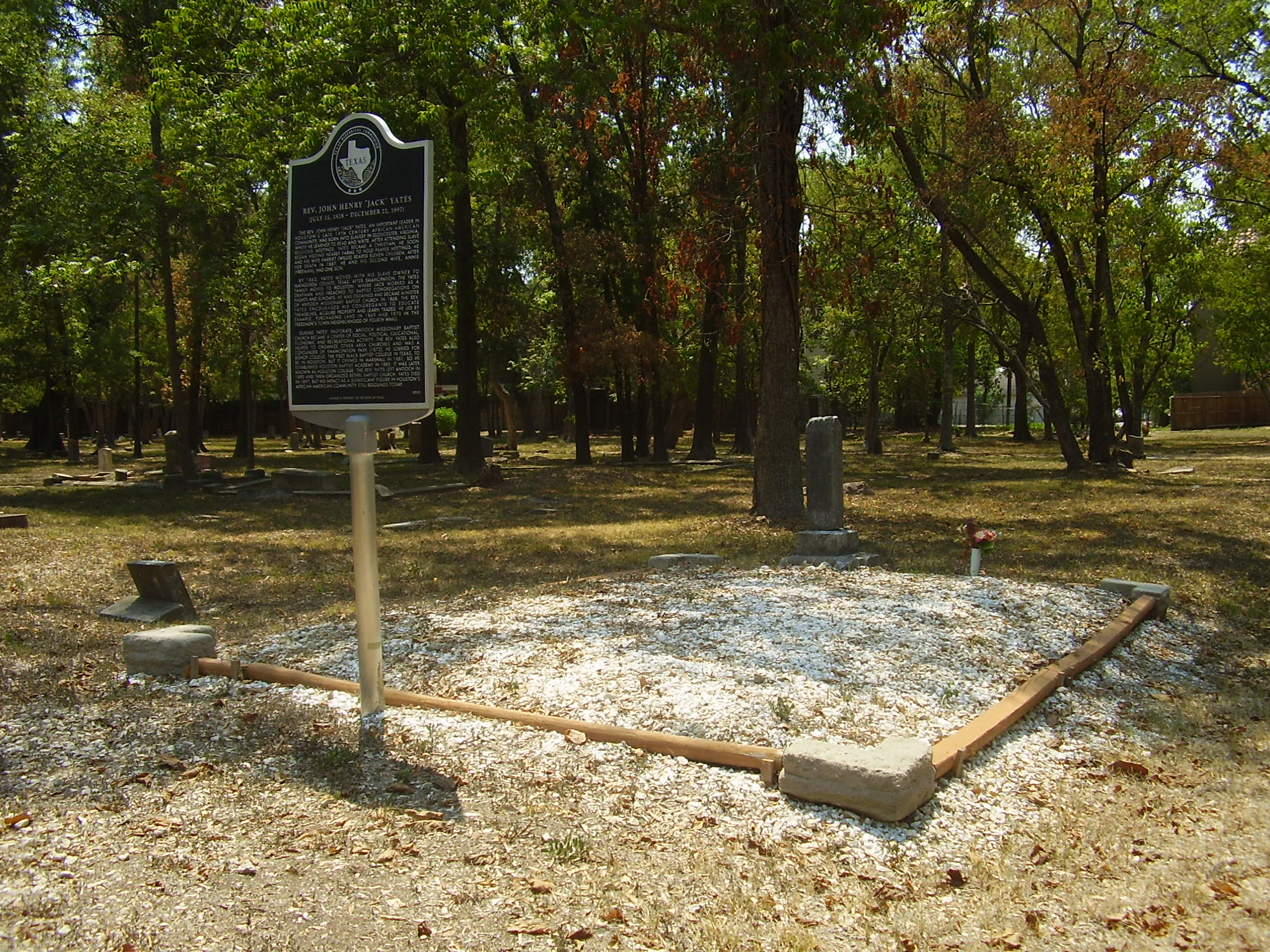
Grave of Jack Yates - College Memorial Park Cemetery

After Harriet Yates died, Yates married Annie Freeman, on October 13, 1888. They had one child. Jack Yates died on December 22, 1897, and was first buried at Olivewood Cemetery, but later reinterred at College Park Cemetery. Yates High School in Houston was named in Yates' honor in 1926.

== The Jack Yates House ==
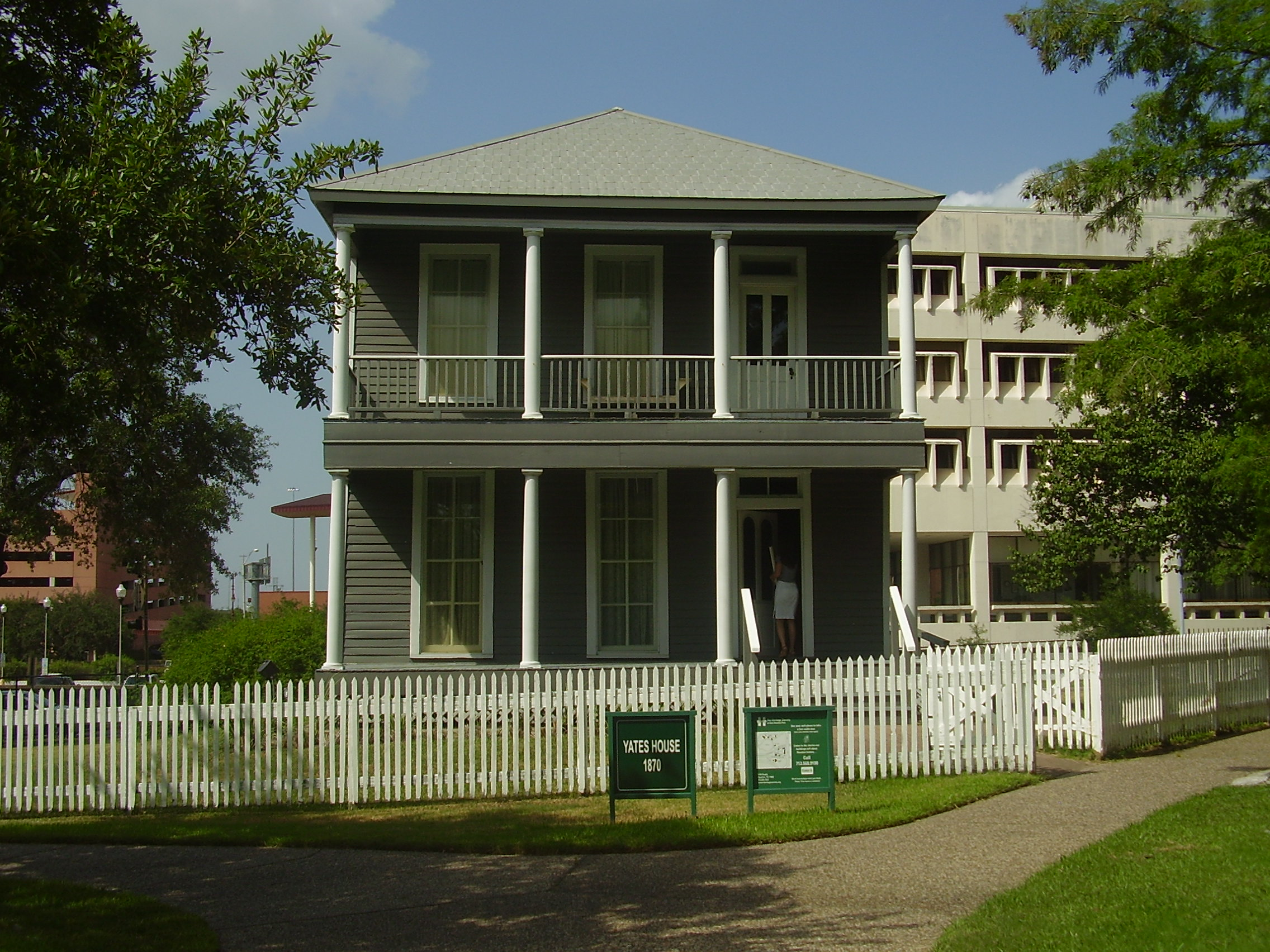
The Jack Yates House, originally in the Fourth Ward and now residing in Sam Houston Park

In 1994, Yates' home was moved from Andrews Street to Sam Houston Park in Houston and restored to its original 1870s configuration. The home was donated to Houston's Heritage Society by Yates' granddaughter, Martha Whiting. The Jack Yates House was first opened to the public in December 1996.

== See also ==
- History of the African-Americans in Houston
- Christianity in Houston
