= Annunciation Greek Orthodox Cathedral (Houston) =

Coordinates: 29°44′27″N 95°23′33″W

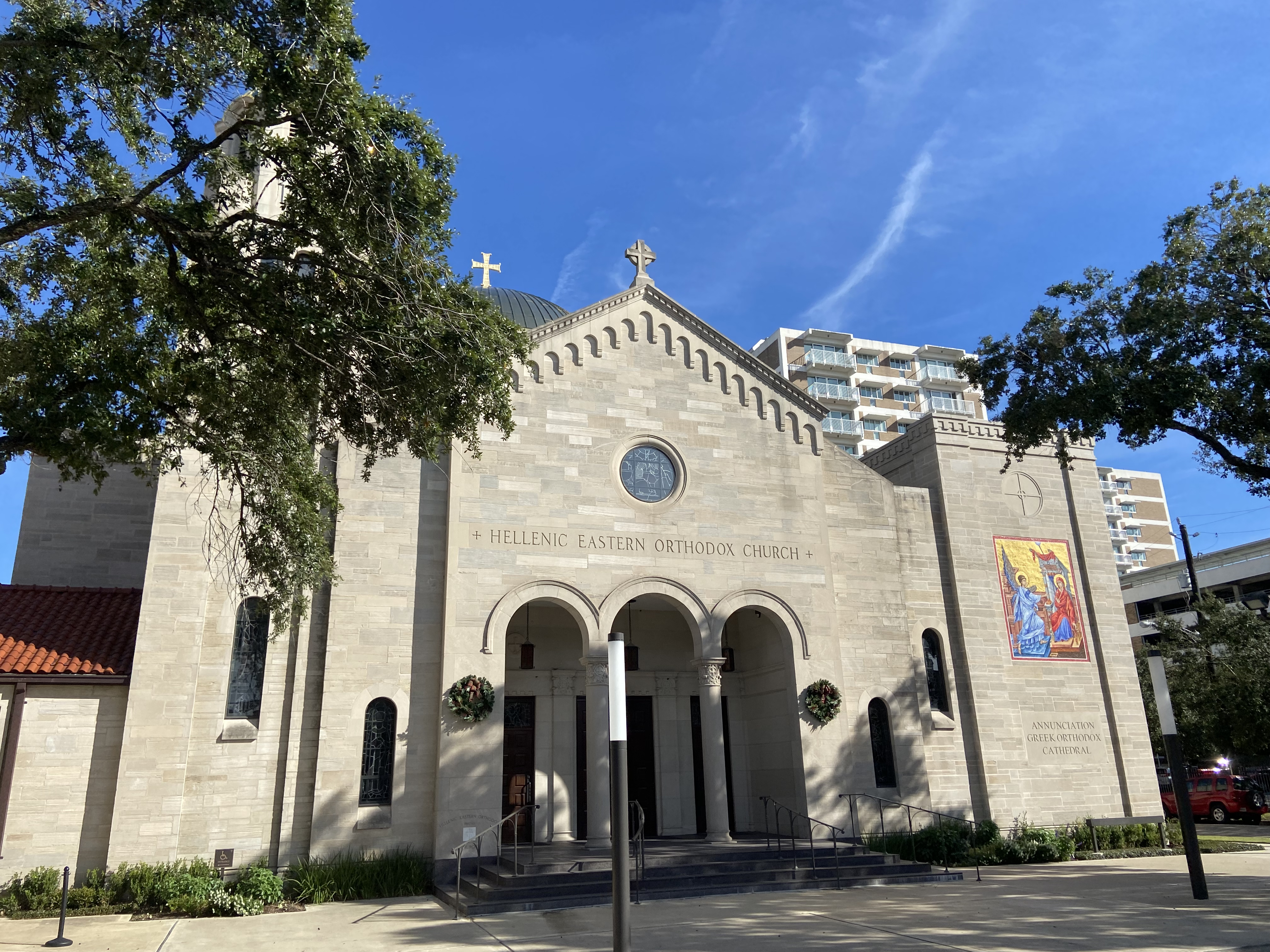
- Annunciation Greek Orthodox Cathedral
- Country: United States
- Denomination: Eastern Orthodoxy
- Website: www.agoc.org

Architecture
- Architectural type: Byzantine
- Years built: 1950-1952

Annunciation Greek Orthodox Cathedral is the spiritual home of the largest Eastern Orthodox parish in Houston, Texas. It is located in Montrose and Neartown.

The cathedral was built from 1950 to 1952 by the Greek community of Houston. From 1967 to 1974, the church was the seat of the Bishop of the 8th Diocesan District of the Greek Orthodox Archdiocese of North and South America. The church provides a variety of ministries and services as well as housing a number of organizations. It is named for the Annunciation of the Virgin Mary and celebrates its feast day on March 25. The church hosts services and also functions as part of the Annunciation Orthodox School.

It is within the Greek Orthodox Archdiocese of America, Metropolis of Denver.

== Architecture ==
The cathedral was designed in a Byzantine Revival style and is a single-aisle domed basilica with a transept. The iconostasis which divides the nave and the altar holds many of the icons from the original 1917 church. A 2018 remodel included installation of a 47' steel truss dome atop a new steel rigid frame of square plan. Constructed initially at ground level and bound at bottom by a steel tension ring, the dome was crane-lifted as a single piece (138,000 pounds) to its final elevation.

== History ==
The first Orthodox church in Houston was built in 1917 on Walker Street in what is now Downtown Houston. The original building was made of wood. Initially in its history, most of its worship services were held in Greek.

In 1950, the church had to move due to city construction and because the parish had outgrown its old building. A new church was built on Yoakum Street in the Neartown area. Its capacity was about 475. The church was completed in 1952. A community hall named for longtime parishioner S.P. Martel was built next door to the church and still serves the community.

In 1960, the Greek Orthodox Archdiocese of North and South America created archdiocesan districts to better serve the Greek Orthodox faithful throughout the country, and Houston was assigned to the 8th Archdiocesan District, which was served by a bishop in New Orleans, Louisiana. In 1967 the seat of the bishop for district 8 was moved to Houston, and Bishop Iakovos of Catania arrived in Houston and consecrated the Annuciation Church as his new cathedral. At that time, the diocese included most of the states in the Great Plains and Rocky Mountain region. Some of the larger parishes were in Dallas, Denver, Kansas City, New Orleans, Oklahoma City, Omaha, Salt Lake City, San Antonio, Shreveport and Tulsa. The dean of the cathedral was Fr. Nicholas Triantafilou, who served as priest in Houston from 1965–1991.

In 1967, to celebrate the 50th anniversary of the Church of the Annunciation, the community hosted a "Greek night." The following year saw the institution of an annual Greek Festival to celebrate Greek culture, food and Orthodox life. In 1970, the parish founded the Annunciation Orthodox School with classes for students from kindergarten through 8th grade.

In 1972, a new bishop was assigned to Houston: Bishop John of Thermon, who was consecrated a bishop in Houston. In 1974, Bishop John moved the see of the diocese to Denver, Colorado, where it has remained ever since. The church in Houston continues to be called a cathedral, however, consistent with the longstanding tradition of many denominations.

The current cathedral building, with a capacity of over 900, opened on September 30, 2018. The price tag of the expanded facility was $12,500,000.

An Icon of Christ above an exterior passageway at Annunciation Greek Orthodox Cathedral in Houston

== The parish today ==
There are two celebrations of the Divine Liturgy (one in English and the other in Greek and English) each Sunday morning, preceded by Orthros or Matins (morning prayers) and followed by a fellowship coffee hour, with Sunday Church School following the first Liturgy.

As of 2018 most services are in English.

The parish operates a Language & Cultural School which provides Greek language and cultural education for all ages every weekday afternoon and evening.

Annunciation Cathedral hosts a variety of ministries. These include the Ladies Philoptochos Society; the Cathedral Choir; GOYA (Greek Orthodox Youth of America); FAITH, HOPE and JOY groups (for young children); PAREA (young adults); AGOSS (singles group). A chapter of Sea-Scouts of the Boy Scouts of America is sponsored by the cathedral. Other ministries, which meet on a regular basis, include marriage preparation and a grief-support group. Through its Philoptochos Society and other organizations, the Cathedral contributes to charitable organizations in the Houston area and nationwide. These charities include both religious and non-religious agencies which help the poor, the sick and those who are in distress. In addition, volunteers from the cathedral assist by translating for Greek-speaking international patients in the Texas Medical Center, visiting with patients and preparing food for those who can't do that for themselves.

== Houston Greek Festival ==
Houston Greek Festival was started in 1967 by the members of Annunciation Greek Orthodox Cathedral as a "Greek Night", which was held on the church's 50th anniversary. The three-day festival is held annually on the first weekend in October (including Thursday) and features Greek food, live Greek music and Greek folk dances, as well as a gift shop and tours of the cathedral. The cathedral grounds on Yoakum Boulevard in the Neartown area of Houston are used to host this annual festival.

Proceeds from the Greek Festival are made to various charitable organizations, such as Children's Assessment Center, S.E.A.R.C.H., the Women's Home, Covenant House, Texas Emergency Aid Coalition (EAC), and the Star of Hope Mission.

The Annunciation congregation now bills its October festival as "The Original Greek Festival" to differentiate itself from other festivals in the Greater Houston Area.

== Annunciation Orthodox School ==
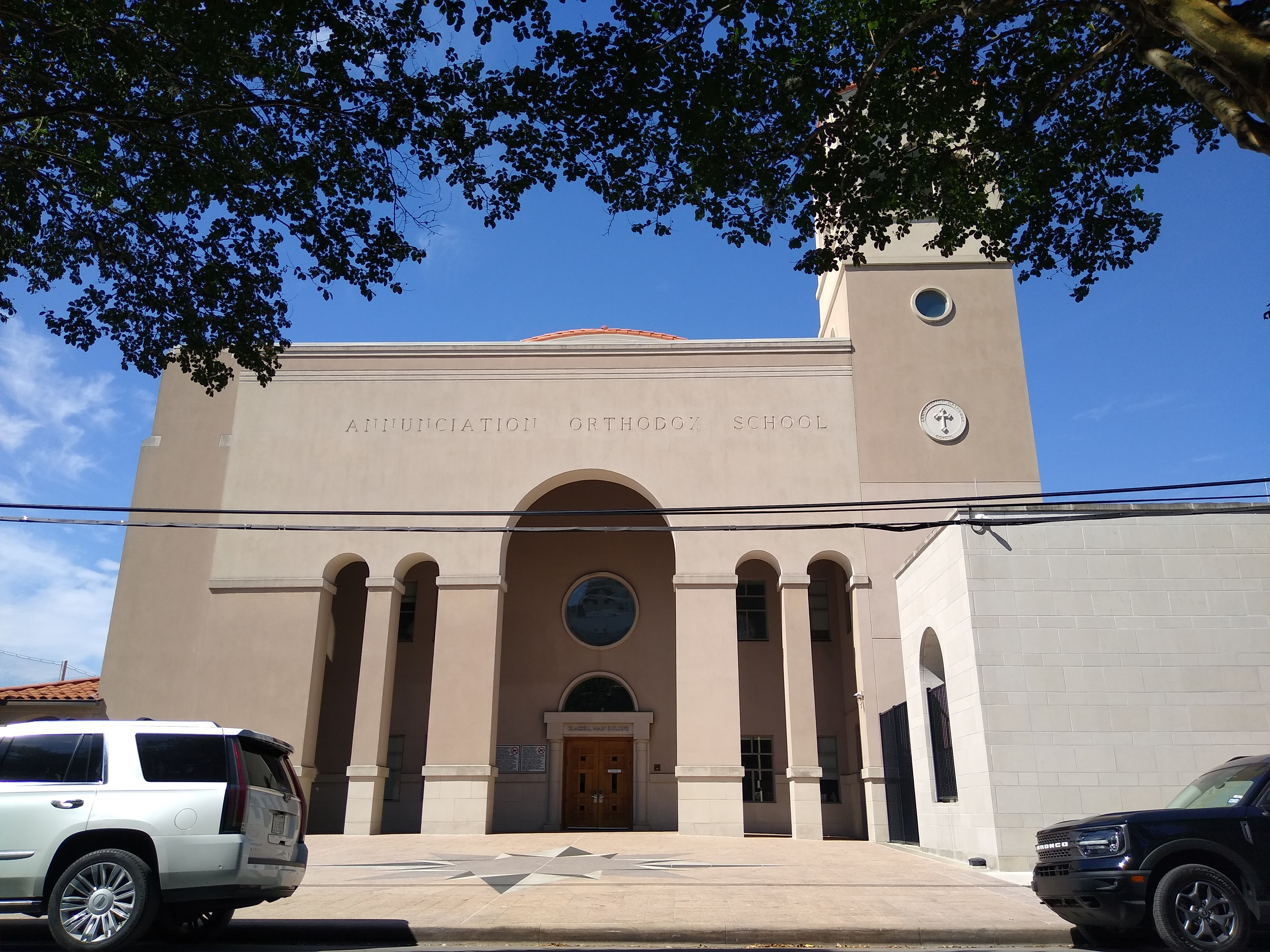
Annunciation Orthodox School, Glassell Main Building

Annunciation Orthodox School is a K-8 school on the church property. As of 2018 it has over 690 students. It is a ministry of the church.

The AOS School opened in 1970 and added one grade level for each year for a period. Its middle school began in 1992.

The main school building, with 64,000 square feet (5,900 m^{2}) of space, opened in 2002. The Katherine E. Veletsos Lower School building, which houses kindergarten through 4th grade, opened in 1993. The Jesse H. and Mary Gibbs Jones Early Childhood Development Center opened in 1988.

In the 1990s Houston City Council at large member Joe Roach, who had a son enrolled in the school, promoted having AOS build a new parking lot by buying a block of Marshall Street. Some area residents opposed on the basis that traffic would increase or that the neighborhood would be physically divided.

== See also ==
- Christianity in Houston
