= Carnegie High School =

Carnegie High School may refer to:

- Carnegie Vanguard High School, Houston, Texas
- Carnegie High School (Oklahoma), Carnegie, Oklahoma
