= Greek Orthodox Metropolis of Denver =

Metropolis of the Greek Orthodox Church

Greek Orthodox Metropolises
Metropolis of Denver

Personnel
Archbishop	Constantine (Moralis)
Cathedral	Assumption of the Theotokos Cathedral

Geography
Location	Texas, Oklahoma, New Mexico, Kansas, Colorado, North Dakota, South Dakota, Idaho, Wyoming, Utah, and Nebraska.

Vital Statistics
Total Parishes	52
- Website: atlmetropolis.org

The Greek Orthodox Metropolis of Denver is one of the Metropolises of the Greek Orthodox Archdiocese of America with 52 parishes.

== Parishes ==
- Annunciation Greek Orthodox Cathedral (Houston)
