= Antioch Missionary Baptist Church =

Historic Baptist church in Houston, Texas, U.S.

- U.S. National Register of Historic Places
- Recorded Texas Historic Landmark
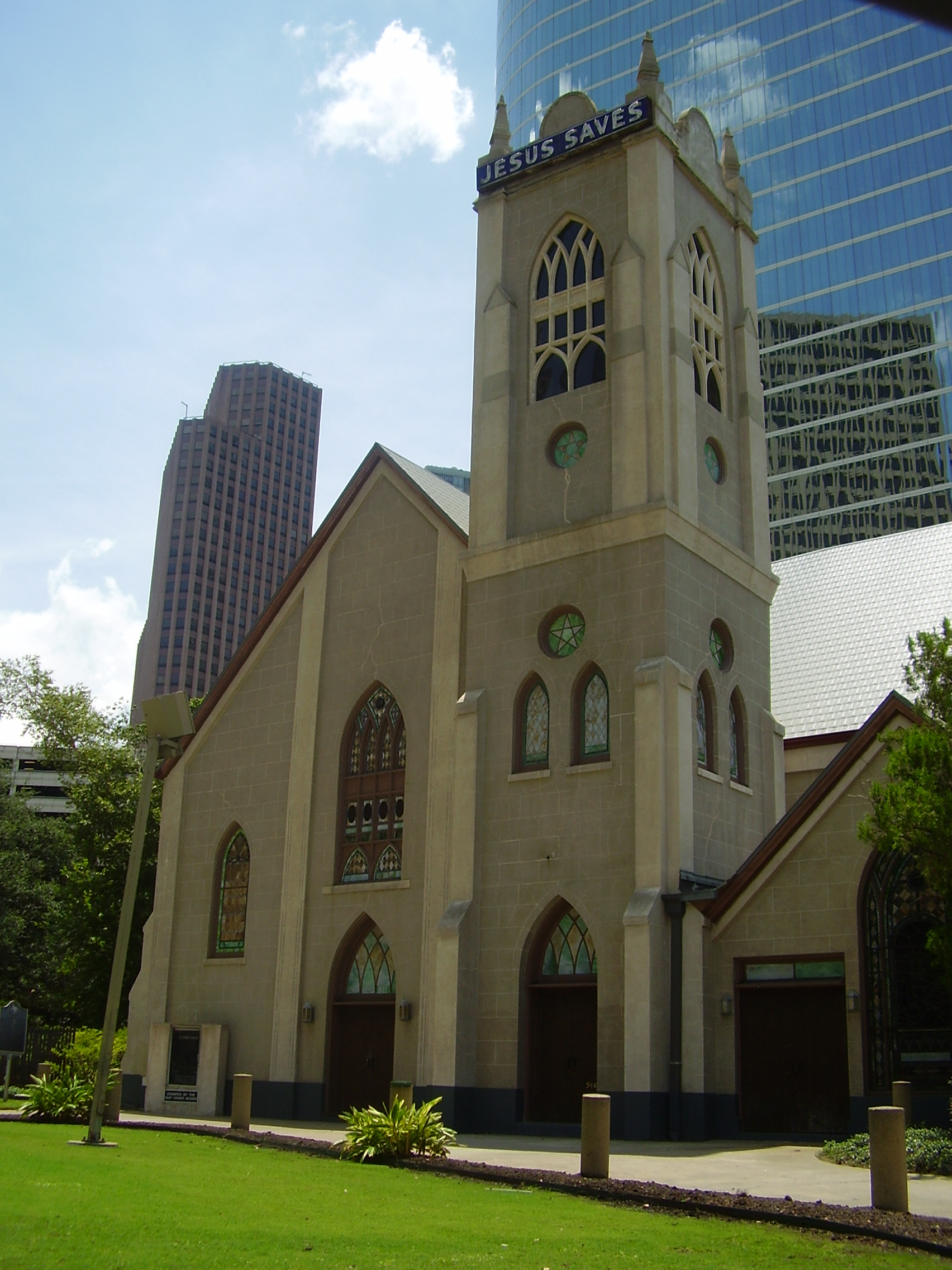
- The church's exterior
- Location: 500 Clay St. Houston, TX
- Area: less than one acre
- Built: 1866
- Architect: Richard Allen
- NRHP reference No.: 76002038
- RTHL No.: 10597

Significant dates
- Added to NRHP: December 22, 1976
- Designated RTHL: 1994

Antioch Missionary Baptist Church is a historic Baptist church at 500 Clay St in Downtown Houston, Texas. It was historically a part of the Fourth Ward. As of 2012 it was the only remaining piece of the original Fourth Ward east of Interstate 45.

Former slaves organized Houston's first African-American Baptist congregation in January 1866. They initially held services outdoors in the "Brush Arbor" along Buffalo Bayou. The congregation built its first sanctuary in 1867 at the corner of Bagby and Rusk.

It was built in 1875 and added to the National Register of Historic Places in 1976.

Jack Yates once served as the pastor of this church.

Antioch Baptist Church's location in a long-established African-American neighborhood faced the encroachment of the growing downtown business district by the 1950s. Some of the buildings going up nearby after mid-century include the Allen Center complex and the Hyatt Regency hotel. The church property is a mere two blocks from the freeway and from Sam Houston Park.

As of 2003 the church has a "Jesus Saves" sign. Rod Davis of the San Antonio Express-News said that the presence of the sign, which "still makes a footnote to the downtown skyscrapers," was "evidence that the oldest African American Baptist church (1875) in the city thrives as well as it did when the Rev. Jack Yates, a former slave, served as its first pastor."

According to the church, the original pews, made by hand, are still used.

In 2019 it became a UNESCO Slave Route Project site.

== See also ==
- Christianity in Houston
- History of the African-Americans in Houston
