= Ralph Tyler =

Ralph Tyler may refer to:

- Ralph W. Tyler (1902–1994), American educator
- Ralph Waldo Tyler (1860–1921), African-American journalist
- Ralph Tyler (long jumper), winner of the 1944 NCAA DI outdoor long jump championship
