= Robert Clay =

Robert Clay may refer to:

- Bob Clay (born 1946), British former Labour MP
- Robert E. Clay (1875–1961), African-American educator
