= Willard Allen =

Willard Allen may refer to:

- Willard Allen (politician) (born 1940), American politician
- Willard H. Allen (1893–1957), American state secretary of agriculture
- Willard Myron Allen (1904–1993), American gynecologist
- Willard W. Allen (1888–2007), director of the NAACP
