= John Brown Bell (businessman) =

American businessman (1858–1917)

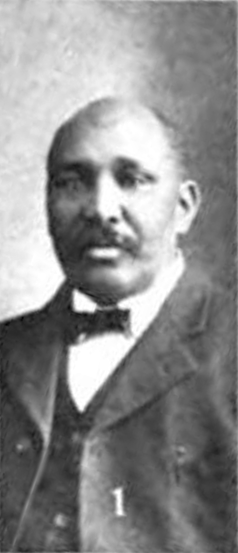
- Born: December 1858; Georgia, U.S.
- Died: November 4, 1917 (aged 58); Houston, Texas, U.S.
- Burial place: Olivewood Cemetery, Houston, Texas, U.S.
- Other names: John B. Bell, John Bell, J. B. Bell
- Occupations: Businessman, real estate investor, civil servant, civic leader
- Spouse: V. Nora Allen (m. 1900–1917; his death)
- Relatives: Richard Allen (father in-law)

John Brown Bell (December 1858 – November 4, 1917), also known as J. B. Bell, was an American businessman, real estate investor, civil servant, and civic leader in Houston, Texas. In his early life he was enslaved, and eventually owned a grocery store, which turned into real estate investments in rental houses. He leased the former home of Emmett Jay Scott in Houston, and as a form a charity he converted it in to a modern hospital and clinic for African Americans during the Jim Crow era.

== Early life ==
John Brown Bell was born enslaved on December 1858, in Georgia. There are varying sources on his exact date of birth and which county he was born. At the age of six months old, he was sold with his mother, and brought to Texas. His father stayed in Georgia.

He had three and half years of schooling before put to work at a grocery store, Rubin and Thorton's in Houston. After one year at the grocery store, the owner died and the widow offered to sell the business to Bell. He bought the grocery store for USD $315, and in order to purchase it Bell had taken a loan from another employer for USD $250. He was able to pay off his loan, and the grocery store was making a monthly profit of USD $200.

In 1900, Bell married V. Nora Allen (also spelled as Venora Allen), the daughter of Richard Allen.

== Career ==
Bell used the money from the grocery store to start buying up empty real estate lots in Houston, and got himself out of managing the grocery store. By 1919, Bell owned 49 rental properties estimated worth more than USD $100,000.

Bell served for 14 years on the board of trustees for Emancipation Park, a historically African American park in the Third Ward area of Houston. For two years, mayor Ben Campbell appointed Bell as a city park manager, during this time period new structures, walk ways, restaurants and bathrooms were built at the park.

Bell was instrumental in the building of the Carnegie Colored Library in Houston (precursor to the Houston Public Library). Bell heard about the project from Emmett Jay Scott and delegated the news of the library to mayor Horace Baldwin Rice, in order to secure annual city funds to upkeep the building. Bell was the chairman of the committee to secure funds to buy the real estate lot. After the library was built in 1913, Bell was made the treasurer of the Library Association.

In 1915, mayor Ben Cambell asked the committees related to the Carnegie Colored Library to aid the city in doing charity work for the African American population. Bell leased the former home of Emmett Jay Scott in Houston, and converted it in to a modern hospital and clinic for the Black population.

Bell was a Master of Solomon Lodge of the United Brothers of Friendship. He served as Chancellor Commander of the True Friends Lodge of the Knights of Pythias, and was a member of Masonic Magnolia Lodge No. 2.

Bell was a member and on the executive committee of Booker T. Washington's National Negro Business League, he also served as the Houston chapter president. He was the Deacon and former treasurer of the Antioch Baptist Church. He also commissioner U. B. F. and S. M. T. of Texas. Bell sat on the Carnegie Colored Library's board of trustees, and was president of the board of directors of Emancipation Park.

== Death ==
Bell died of apoplexy on November 4, 1917, in Houston, and is buried at Olivewood Cemetery in Houston.
