= John F. Harris (politician) =

American lawyer and politician

- Born: c. 1827-1831
- Died: August 20, 1913; Greenville, Mississippi
- Occupations: Lawyer and politician

John F. Harris (c. 1830 – August 20, 1913) was an African-American lawyer and politician from Greenville, Mississippi. In the mid- and late-1880s he was a member of the Greenville city council and in 1890 he was elected to the Mississippi House of Representatives. He was also a member of numerous local civic organizations. He is noted for an 1890 speech given to the state house in support of an appropriations bill for a monument to Confederate veterans of the American Civil War.

== Early life ==
John F. Harris was likely born sometime between 1827 and 1831. He was a slave until the end of the American Civil War (1861–1865), and was a member of the Confederate forces with his master at battles like Seven Pines and others around Richmond. As a slave, he worked as a carpenter. After achieving his freedom, he began to study law and was largely self-taught. Like fellow African American lawyer Nathan S. Taylor, studied law in the offices of Percy and Yerger, one of the most prominent firms in Greenville. Harris was said to "carry a saw under one arm and a Mississippi [Law] Code under the other and ... when he was not doing carpenter work he was reading the Code. Harris was admitted to the Greenville bar in December 1870. He continued to work as a carpenter even as he worked as a lawyer and public servant, once joking that he feared a return of slavery would force him back to his previous job, and besides, "law business is powerful dull".

There were few black lawyers in Mississippi at the time, and there was not always unity among them. In December 1873, Harris attempted to disbar fellow African American lawyer, John D. Werles. Harris became politically active in the late 1870s, running for Chancery Clerk in 1879. A Republican, he was politically aligned with Republican civil rights activists John R. Lynch and James L. Alcorn and was opposed by Democrats for being hostile to whites.

== Political career ==
He became a city councilman in Greenville by 1884, holding the position until 1889. In 1890 he was elected to the Mississippi House of Representatives. As a Representative, Harris opposed the 1890 constitutional convention. The 1890 convention considered provisions for the disenfranchisement of blacks as being the most important. Indeed, the implementation of these measures was the reason for the convention's very existence. In February 1890, Harris gave a speech in favor of an appropriations bill which gave $10,000 for the placement of a Confederate memorial monument. The speech was in part a reply to opposition to the monument led by white representative Ed S. Watson. This speech has been used as evidence that Harris was supportive of the Confederacy and what it stood for.

Harris' career was not uniformly successful. He was brought to court on charges of criminal activity at least twice. In 1888, he was accused of bribery and corruption. In 1903, he was acquitted of a crime, this time of receiving money for stolen property.

== Other activities and death ==
In 1905, Harris became a leader in the Mississippi state affiliate of the Booker T. Washington founded the National Negro Business League. He was also a member of the Knights and Daughters of Jacob, a fraternal organization which worked to raise money to support widows and orphans.

He died at his home in Greenville on the morning of August 20, 1913.
