= Robert H. Carter III =

American pharmacist (1847–1908)

Robert H. Carter III (January 12, 1847 - January 13, 1908) was an American pharmacist. He was the first African American certified pharmacist from Massachusetts. By 1871, Carter worked for druggist and chemist William P. S. Caldwell on 49 Purchase Street. He married hairdresser Parthenia M. Harris on July 8, 1869. They had six children. Between 1876 and 1907, he owned and managed pharmacies in Boston and New Bedford, Massachusetts. On January 5, 1896, he was certified as a registered pharmacist. He worked as a pharmacist for 37 years. He was a member of the National Negro Business League.

He died January 13, 1908, in Brighton, Boston of tuberculosis.
