= Gilbert C. Harris =

American businessperson (1853–1921)

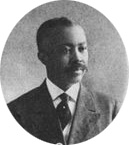
Gilbert C. Harris, C. 1900

Gilbert C. Harris (1853 – 1921) was an American businessperson, community leader and wig maker in Boston, Massachusetts. He served as treasurer of the National Negro Business League.

== Life and career ==
Gilbert C. Harris was born in c. 1853, in Petersburg, Virginia. He moved from Virginia to Boston in 1892. A 1918 book documented him as being "mulatto".

He acquired and continued to operate Frenchman M. Alphonse Gilbert's Gilbert & Co. wig business at 732 Washington Street. He supplied wigs to theater companies including via a mail order business. Henry Wilson Savage, Charlotte Cushman, and Henry Irving were among his clients.

He co-founded a Colored Odd Fellows Lodge in Boston.

== See also ==
- Mary L. Johnson, maker of the Johnson Hair Food pomade and a wig maker, scientific scalp specialist, and hair "culturist"
- L. C. Parrish, wig maker and hair weaver in Boston
- T. J. Jones (businessman), Boston manufacturer of Lusterine
