= Estella Crosby =

American businesswoman (1890–1978)

Estella Crosby (c. 1890–c. 1978) was an African-American businesswoman, beautician and community organizer. She ran a dry goods store on Hammond Street with her husband for 20 years.

== Early life ==
She was born in Alexandria, Virginia and moved to South End, Boston where she married Adrian Crosby and became active in local Republican politics. She bought a row house on 11 Greenwich Park with her husband in 1925.

== Public affairs ==
Crosby organized Boston's Neighborhood Scottsboro Defense Club in 1933 which supported the defense of the Scottsboro Boys, nine African-American boys who were on trial for the rape of two white women in Scottsboro, Alabama. The Scottsboro Defense Committee, founded by the American Communist Party and the National Association for the Advancement of Colored People, led marches across the country. The marches led to the formation of local clubs that supported the defense of the Scottsboro nine.

She co-founded the Boston unit of the National Housewives’ League of America with Geneva Arrington and E. Alice Taylor in the 1930s. Estella chaired the annual convention of the National Negro Business League in Boston in 1955. She was also an active member of the League of Women Voters, the International Institute, the Boston City Federation, the Boston Trade Association, the National Association of Colored Women's Clubs, founded by Harriet Tubman and Ida B. Wells among others, and the General Federation of Women’s Clubs of Massachusetts.

She was the vice president of the Council of Elders of Roxbury in her later years. She ran a women’s clothing store in South End until she died in 1978.

Her home is featured on the Boston Women’s Heritage Trail. In 2023, she was recognized as one of "Boston’s most admired, beloved, and successful Black Women leaders" by the Black Women Lead project.
