= Joseph Haygood Blodgett =

American architect (1858–1934)

- Born: February 8, 1858; Augusta, Georgia, U.S.
- Died: June 5, 1934 (aged 76); Jacksonville, Florida, U.S.
- Other name: J. H. Blodgett
- Occupations: Architect, contractor

Joseph Haygood Blodgett (1858–1934), usually referred to as J. H. Blodgett, was a contractor and architect, living and working in Jacksonville, Florida, during the early twentieth century. He was African American.

== Life and career ==
Blodgett was born into slavery in Augusta, Georgia on February 8, 1858. As a teenager, he left the farm and went to Summerville, South Carolina, where he initially worked as a laborer but eventually established his own businesses, including a drayage operation and a lumberyard, before turning to farming. After a bankruptcy he relocated to Jacksonville, working for the railroad before resuming some of his earlier business operations, including another lumberyard. In 1898, he went into the contracting business full-time and was responsible for much housing in the expanding city.

After Jacksonville's Great Fire of 1901, which wiped out much of the city proper, Blodgett joined the rapid rebuilding of the city. By 1919 it was estimated that his firm was responsible for more than 250 houses, a number of which he retained as an investment. Most of these were small houses built in predominantly African American neighborhoods of the city, though he was also responsible for a number of larger homes in the Craftsman and Colonial Revival styles, including his own, called "Blodgett Villa," formerly on West 8th Street in Jacksonville. He also was responsible for housing in Georgia, Massachusetts, North Carolina and Oklahoma. Due to declining health, he retired from business in the 1920s. At the time of his death, which occurred June 5, 1934, he was thought to be one of the wealthiest African Americans in Florida.

== Works ==
Many of Blodgett's buildings were destroyed as part of urban renewal efforts in Jacksonville's African American communities. However, some, chiefly residences, do survive:

- Mortuary for Lawton L. Pratt, 525 W Beaver St, Jacksonville, Florida (1915)
- Houses for Joseph H. Blodgett, 1241 and 1251 Hart St, Jacksonville, Florida (no date)
- Houses for Joseph H. Blodgett, 1441 and 1447 N Myrtle Ave, Jacksonville, Florida (no date)
- Houses for Joseph H. Blodgett, 1476 and 1480 N Myrtle Ave, Jacksonville, Florida (no date)

== Personal life and legacy ==
In addition to his business success, Blodgett was a community leader. After the 1901 fire, he was a director of a relief organization to coordinate relief within the African American community. Blodgett also supported the local chapter of the National Negro Business League, as well as Edward Waters College and his church.

Blodgett married Sallie A. Barnes of Bamberg, South Carolina in 1894.

Blodgett was the namesake of Blodgett Homes, a large 1942-built public housing project in Jacksonville, and also of its replacement, Blodgett Villas.
