= National Negro Business League =

American organization founded in Boston in 1900

- Type: Business group
- Founded: 1900
- Founder: Booker T. Washington
- Successor: National Business League
- Headquarters: Washington, D.C., United States
- Services: Promote the interests of Black-owned businesses

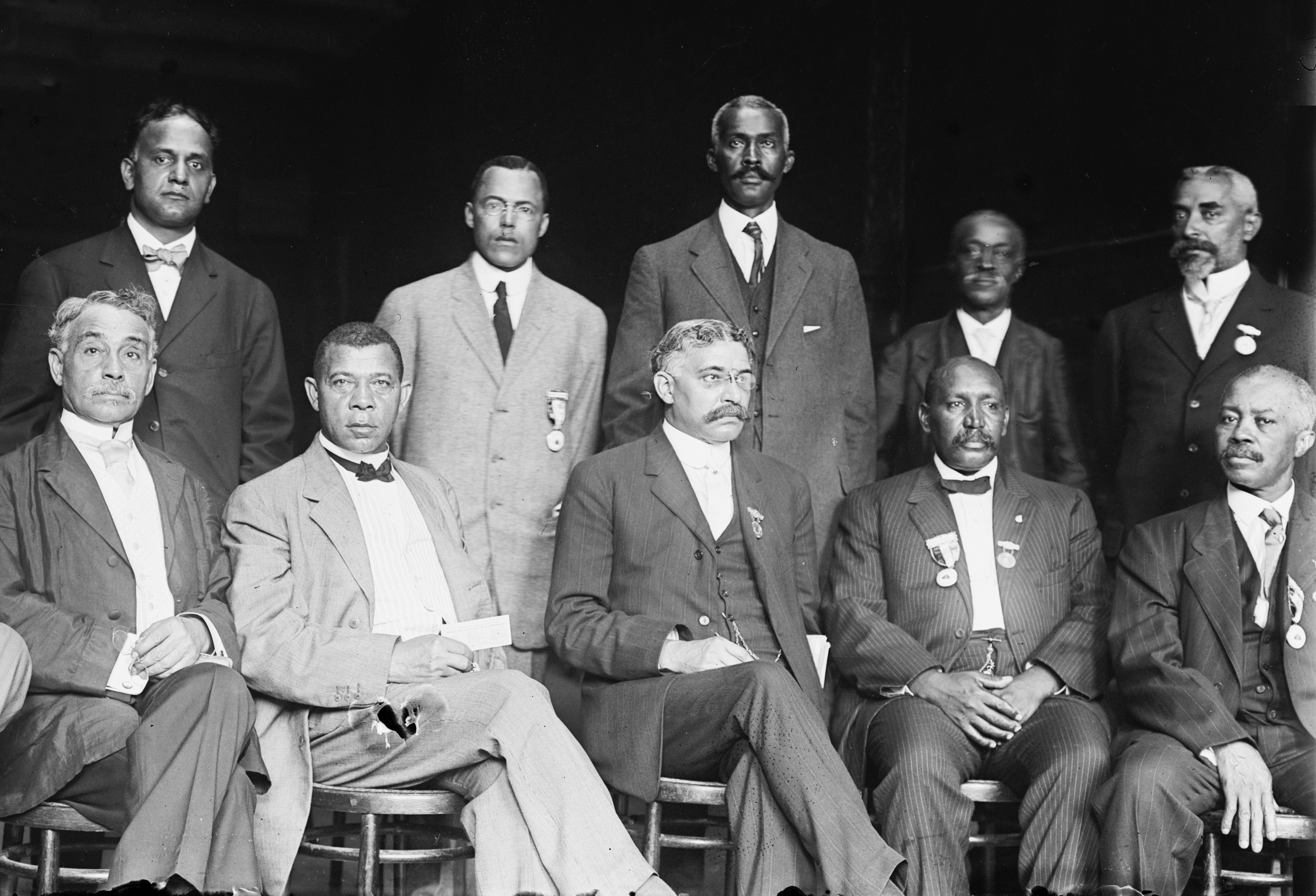
Executive Committee of the National Negro Business League, c. 1910. NNBL founder Booker T. Washington (1856-1915) is seated, second from the left

The National Negro Business League (NNBL) was an American organization founded in Boston in 1900 by Booker T. Washington to promote the interests of African-American businesses. The mission and main goal of the National Negro Business League was "to promote the commercial and financial development of the Negro." It was recognized as "composed of negro men and women who have achieved success along business lines". It grew rapidly with 320 chapters in 1905 and more than 600 chapters in 34 states in 1915.

In 1966, the League was renamed and reincorporated in Washington D.C. as the National Business League, which remains in operation.

== History ==
=== Establishment ===
The National Negro Business League (NNBL) was established in Boston, Massachusetts in 1900 by Booker T. Washington. The first meeting was held at the house of Samuel E. Courtney in Boston. The effort of the organization was supported by industrialist and philanthropist Andrew Carnegie. The organization was formally incorporated in 1901 in New York, and established 320 chapters across the United States.

The League included Negro small- business owners, doctors, farmers, other professionals, and craftsmen. Its goal was to allow business to put economic development at the forefront of getting African-American equality in the United States. Business was the main concern, but civil rights came next.

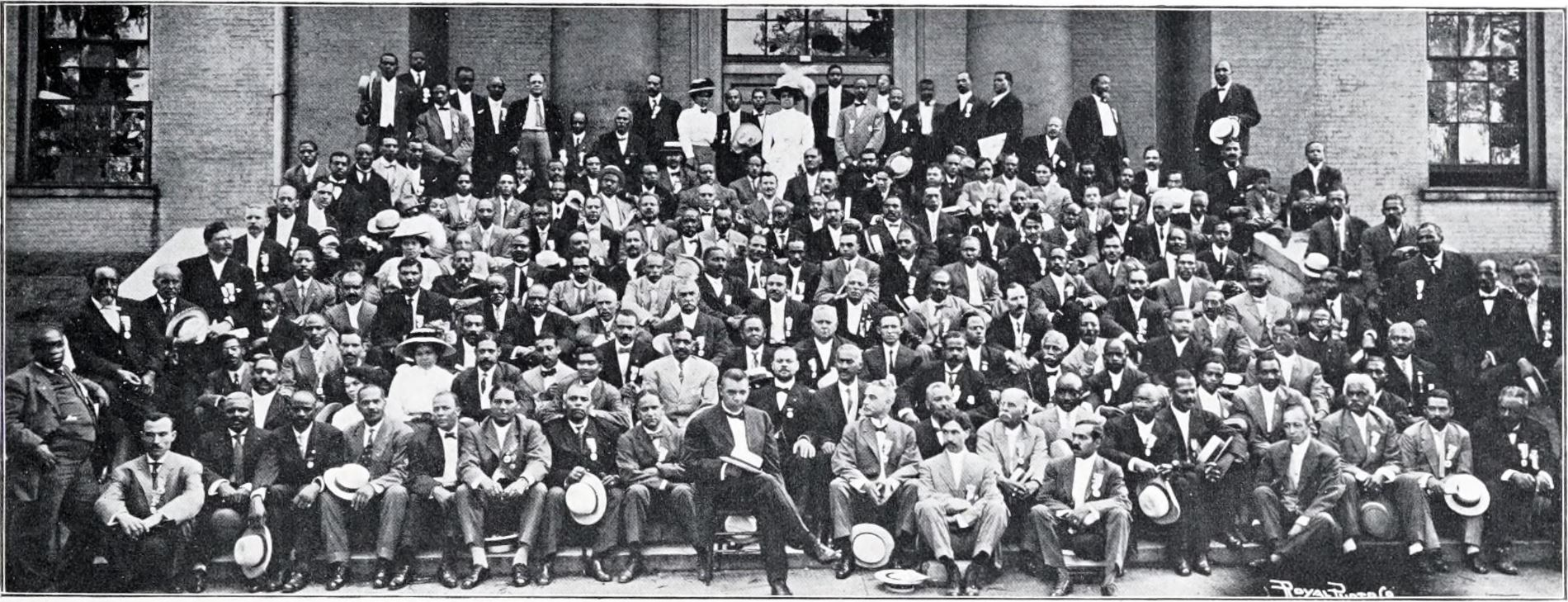
A meeting in Louisville, Kentucky, on August 18, 1909

In 1905 the Nashville, Tennessee, chapter protested segregation in local transit with a boycott. Booker T. Washington felt that there was a need for African Americans to build an economic network and allow that to be a catalyst for change and social improvement. Also, extant press releases indicate that "the League organized the National Negro Business Service to 'help . . the Negro business men of the country solve their merchandising and advertising problems,' promoted advertising in Negro newspapers and magazines, and 'influenced . . . national advertisers to use Negro publications in reaching this importantly valuable group of people with its tremendous purchasing power.'"

The organization inspired Robert R. Church Sr. to open Solvent Savings Bank in Memphis, Tennessee in 1906. In 1927, the bank merged with Fraternal Savings Bank and Trust. It closed in 1929.

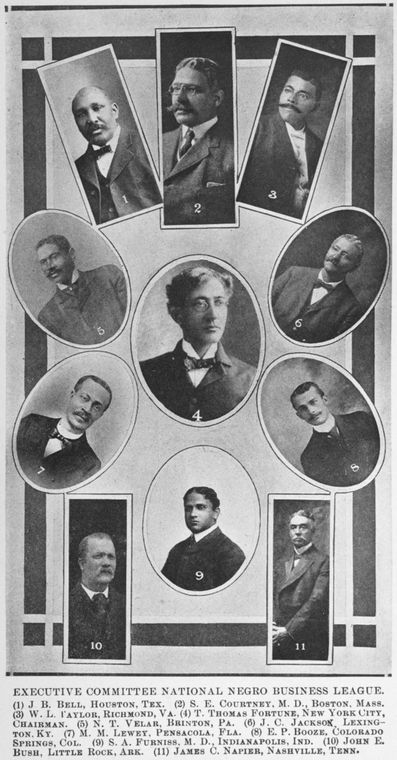
National Negro Business League portraits (1907)

In 1907 the group's Executive Committee included J. B. Bell of Houston, Texas; 2. S. E. Courtney, M.D. of Boston, Massachusetts; W. L. Taylor of Richmond, Virginia; T. Thomas Fortune of New York City, Chairman; N. T. Velar of Brinton, Pennsylvania; J. C. Jackson of Lexington, Kentucky; M. M. Lewey of Pensacola, Florida; E. P. Booze of Colorado Springs, Colorado; S. A. Furniss M.D. of Indianapolis, Indiana; John E. Bush of Little Rock, Arkansas; and James C. Napier of Nashville, Tennessee.

In May 1913, a respected Black journalist, Ralph Waldo Tyler was elected as the first National Organizer of the NNBL. Tyler's role was to travel throughout the Southern United States and document the state of negro businesses and encourage enrollment in the NNBL.

After the death of Booker T. Washington in 1915, the League was headed by his successor at Tuskegee, Robert Russa Moton. Albon L. Holsey, an executive at Tuskegee, was executive secretary of the League. Other leaders in 1922–23 were John L. Webb, treasurer (succeeding Charles H. Anderson), and Charles Clinton Spaulding, head of the North Carolina Mutual Life Insurance Co. in Durham, North Carolina.

== Affiliations ==
Affiliated professional organizations included: the National Negro Bankers Association, the National Negro Press Association, the National Association of Negro Funeral Directors, the National Negro Bar Association, the National Association of Negro Insurance Men, the National Negro Retail Merchants' Association, the National Association of Negro Real Estate Dealers, and the National Negro Finance Corporation.

The National Negro Bankers Association was organized at a meeting of the League in 1906 by Birmingham's William R. Pettiford.

== Notable members ==
=== Executive committee ===
- Cyrus Field Adams
- Charles Banks
- John Brown Bell
- Eugene P. Booze
- John E. Bush
- Samuel E. Courtney
- Timothy Thomas Fortune
- Sumner Alexander Furniss
- Gilbert C. Harris
- Mont Howell
- Jordan Carlisle Jackson Jr.
- Scipio Africanus Jones
- Matthew M. Lewey
- James Carroll Napier
- Philip A. Payton Jr.
- Emmett Jay Scott
- William Lee Taylor
- Nathan Thomas Velar
- Samuel Laing Williams

=== Members and people associated ===
- Sam Aleckson
- Willard W. Allen
- Joseph Haygood Blodgett
- Scott Winfield Bond
- R. H. Boyd
- Charlotte Hawkins Brown
- Robert H. Carter III
- James Garneth Carter
- George Washington Carver
- Alice A. Casneau
- Joseph Samuel Clark
- Robert E. Clay
- Edward Elder Cooper
- Estella Crosby
- James Dean
- Aristede Dejoie
- Annie Fisher
- Samuel B. Fuller
- John F. Harris
- Trudy Haynes
- Robert Lee Hill
- Albon Holsey
- T. R. M. Howard
- Giles Beecher Jackson
- Theodore W. Jones
- Mame Stewart Josenberger
- John A. Lankford
- John Angelo Lester
- Clarence Lightner
- Samuel R. Lowery
- Moses McKissack III
- Fred R. Moore
- Elias Camp Morris
- Frederick Patterson
- William R. Pettiford
- Samuel Plato
- Jake Simmons
- Albreta Moore Smith
- Skippy Smith
- Sallie Wyatt Stewart
- Joseph H. Stuart
- Ralph Waldo Tyler
- Madam C. J. Walker
- Maggie L. Walker
- Virgil Wood
- Lloyd Garrison Wheeler

== See also ==
- Civil rights movement (1896–1954)
- American business history
- African American business history
