= Samuel E. Courtney =

African American physician (1865–1941)

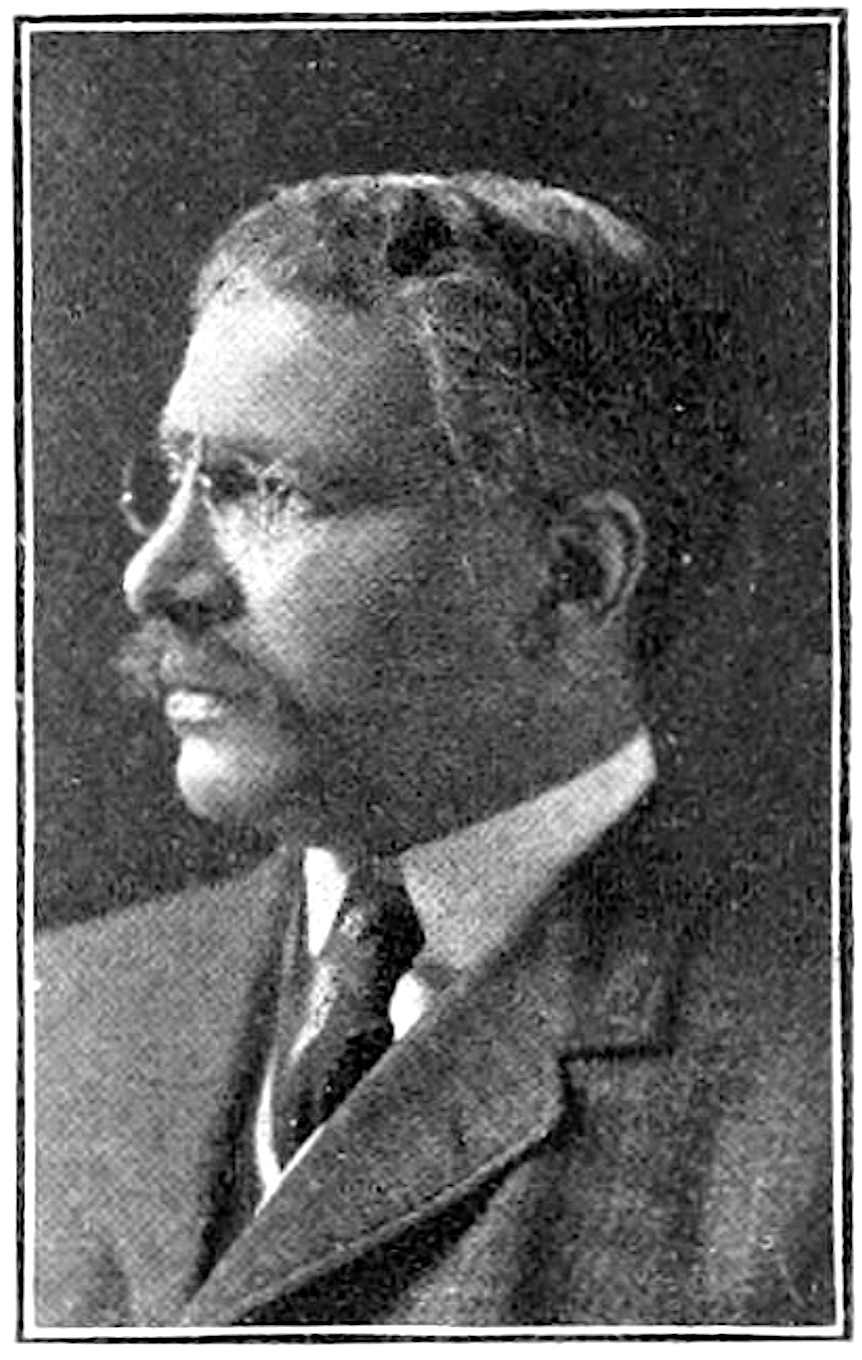
- Born: Samuel Edward Courtney c. 1860; Malden, West Virginia, U.S.
- Died: June 1, 1941 (aged 80–81); Boston, Massachusetts, U.S.
- Other name: S. E. Courtney
- Education: Hampton Institute (BA), Westfield Normal School, Harvard Medical School (MD)
- Occupations: Physician, politician, teacher
- Political party: Republican
- Spouse: Lilla Virginia Davis (m. 1896–1941; his death)
- Children: 6

Samuel Edward Courtney (c. 1860 – June 1, 1941), also known as S. E. Courtney, was an American physician, teacher, and politician in Boston. He was a founding member of the National Negro Business League.

== Early life and education ==
Samuel Edward Courtney was born enslaved in c. 1860, in Malden, West Virginia. His father was a wealthy white planter, and his mother was an enslaved biracial servant. In day school in West Virginia, Courtney studied under Booker T. Washington, who had encouraged him to continue his education. He was one of the pupils colloquially known as "Booker Washington's boys", students who Washington paid special attention to and he considered to have promise.

Courtney attended Hampton Institute (B.A. 1879, now Hampton University) in Hampton, Virginia; the Westfield Normal School (1880–1882, now Westfield State University) in Westfield, Massachusetts; and Harvard Medical School (M.D. 1892, or 1894). He was an early Black graduate of Harvard Medical School.

== Career ==
Courtney taught mathematics and drawing at Tuskegee Institute (now Tuskegee University) in Tuskegee, Alabama from 1885 until 1888. He enrolled in Harvard Medical School in 1888.

In 1896, Courtney married Lilia Virginia Davis, an educator. She was one of the founders and first teacher of the Cotton Valley School in Fort Davis, Alabama. Together they had 6 children. Two of their sons Samuel E. Courtney Jr. (1897–1929) and Roger Davis Courtney (1901–1930) were tarred and feathered on April 19, 1919 during the Red Summer by a white mob at the University of Maine's Hannibal Hamlin Hall, and survived. The university President Robert J. Aley claimed the incident was hazing related, and not race related; both brothers transferred to other universities.

In 1895, Courtney became a licensed physician in Massachusetts. He interned at Boston City Hospital, and followed by work as a House Physician at the Boston Lying-In Hospital (now Brigham and Women's Hospital). His medical office was in the South End neighborhood at 98 West Springfield Street in Boston.

Courtney attended the 1896 Republican National Convention in St. Louis, Missouri as an alternate delegate-at-large and represented Massachusetts in the 8th congressional district. He served two terms on the Boston School Committee.

Courtney was a founding member of the National Negro Business League, and the first meeting in 1900 was held at his home. He also served as one of the member of the executive committee.

In 1932, Courtney was assaulted by three men in his medical office.

Courtney had been a trustee of the Tuskegee Institute. He was a member of the Bay State Medical Association, and the South End Medical Society. He also active on various Republican Party committees.

== Death and legacy ==
Courtney died on June 1, 1941, at Boston City Hospital. He had surgery days prior to his death.

In 1989, he was honored by Westfield State College (now Westfield State University) in Westfield, Massachusetts when a new residence hall was named for him.

== See also ==
- Thomas Graham Dorsey
- James Thomas Still
- Fannie Smith Washington
