= James Dean (judge) =

African-American politician in Florida (1858–1914)

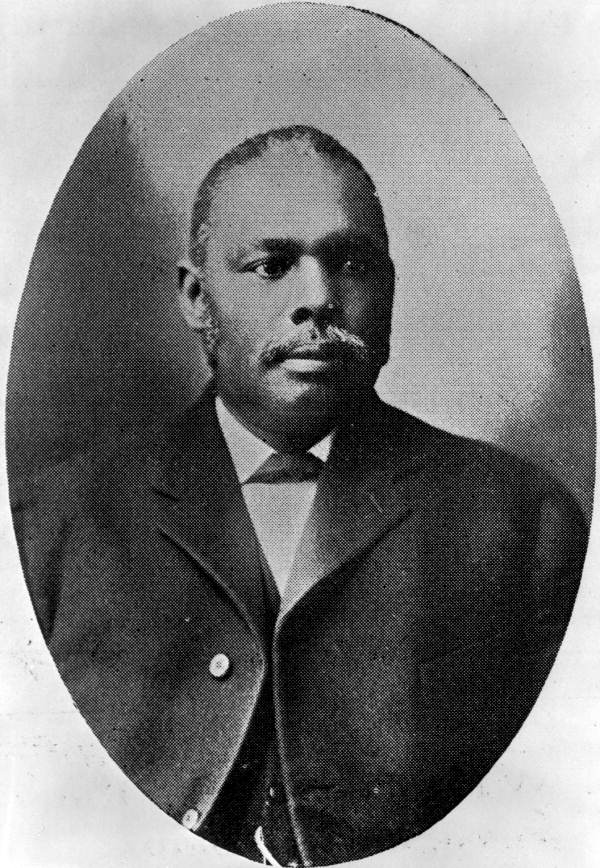
- A photograph from circa 1870.
- Born: February 14, 1858
- Died: 1914 (aged 55–56)
- Occupations: Educator, judge, minister, lawyer, businessman

James Dean (February 14, 1858 – 1914) was the first black judge elected in Florida after Reconstruction. Dean was born in Ocala, Florida. He graduated from Cookman Institute and Howard University and actively participated in the politics and in his religious faith. He was a county judge in Monroe County, Florida, until Florida governor Francis P. Fleming removed him from office. He was removed from office without a hearing after he married a Cuban couple, allegedly in violation of anti-miscegenation laws. He was restored in good standing posthumously in 2002 by Florida governor Jeb Bush.

== Early life ==
James Dean was reportedly born into slavery in Ocala, Florida February 14, 1858. Although no certain conclusions can be drawn about Dean's parentage, census records suggest that Kelly Dean and Minton Young Dean (married July 22, 1869) were Dean's father and mother. Dean and his family were relocated to Wellborn in Suwannee County during Dean's childhood where he grew up attending the African Methodist Episcopal (AME) church and attended a school operated by the National Freedman's Relief Association in Lake City.

== Education ==
From 1865 to 1869 or 1870, Dean attended the National Freedman's Relief Association then attended Suwannee County's public school until 1873. With the goal of becoming a teacher, Dean transferred back to Lake City in order to attend a school run by Reverend Jerome B. Armstrong for a short time before attending Brown's University until 1874 when a hurricane destroyed the building. Dean attended Cookman Institute in Jacksonville Florida in 1874 which was affiliated with the Methodist religion and specialized in training Black religious leaders and teachers. He graduated Cookman Institute in 1876 and then toured north Florida to examined the best Floridian schools for African American children. After visiting Tallahassee, Lake City, Baldwin, and Gainesville, he moved to his home area and lived in Live Oak while teaching and serving in his church for about a year. In 1883 Dean graduated as valedictorian from Howard University with a bachelor of arts and was accepted into Howard University School of Law where he gained a Bachelor of Law in 1883 and a Masters of Law in 1884 after graduating as valedictorian once more.

== Political involvement ==
Dean's life was one of politics and religion during an era of segregation and Jim Crow laws. He was a Republican activist who served in many offices over the course of his life. In 1879 Dean was introduced to local and state politics through his federal job in Key West serving as the special inspector of customs for the city. During his studies of law at Howard University, Dean worked as a clerk in the Office of the Auditor of the Treasury for the Post Office Department. In 1880, Dean was selected to be a delegate from Monroe County in the Republican First District Congressional Convention held in Washington, D.C., where he supported George W. Witherspoon's candidacy even though Witherspoon was a democrat. In 1881, Dean was made assistant secretary of the Republican State Convention, and was elected as a Florida delegate to the Republican National Convention.

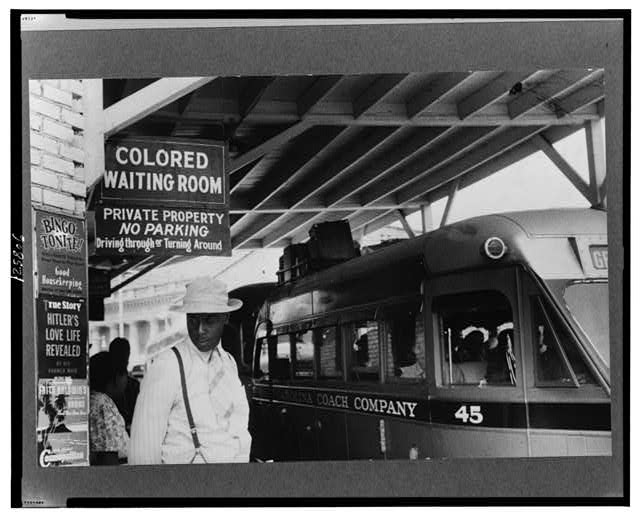
A Black man waits for a train in a segregated waiting area in the midst of the Jim Crow era

In 1884 Dean was appointed president of the State Conference of the Colored Men of Florida held in Gainesville Florida. Presiding over the meeting, Dean was able to serve as a fair mediator in the politically charged conference. The platform of the conference aimed to persuade voters to elect an Independent Governor who would help the conferences agenda. This agenda supported 1) increasing funding for African American schools to decrease illiteracy, 2) being treated fairly and equally in trials and in juries, 3) to be protected voters and to have their votes count, 4) increased representation in State and county offices and city governments, 5) desegregation of public transportation and be treated equally as White patrons, 6) the restoration of the right to vote to those who had been accused of petty offenses in a court of law (most of whom were Black).

Dean especially emphasized the importance of education and desired to allocate slavery reparations to the funding of Florida public schools. This conference was held at a time in Florida's history where educational reforms were taking place to close the discrepancy between the proportion of the Black and White population who were illiterate. While educational reforms had been made at this time for African American children, literacy rates of Black people still lagged behind the White population.

In October of the same year Dean presided over the State Conference, he was admitted to the District of Columbia's bar of the Supreme Court, and in 1888 Dean was elected as a County Judge.

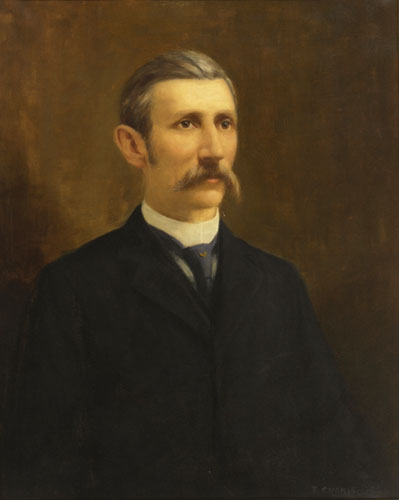
Portrait of Francis P. Fleming, governor of Florida January 8, 1889 – January 3, 1893

== Judgeship ==
Dean was appointed a Monroe County Judge in November 1888 and took office January 1889, but his tenure was extremely short. After less than 8 months in office, Dean was accused of by Eugene O. Locke of breaking the law and Governor Francis P. Fleming issued an executive order on July 23, 1889, suspending Dean from judgeship until the next session of the Senate was concluded. The charge against Dean stated: On January 9 of 1889, Dean knowingly issued a marriage license to a White man (Antonio Gonzales) with the intent of marrying a mulatto woman (Anna Maloney), an illegal practice at the time. Dean maintained that, although Antonio appeared to be White, Antonio swore under oath that he was Cuban and as such the marriage did not break any interracial marital laws. If Dean had not issued the marriage license to Gonzales, it is likely that Dean would have gotten into legal trouble for acting as if a man who swore he wasn't White actually was.

Governor Fleming was hesitant to make Dean step down, but when Dean gave a defense of himself and ensured that Antonio was a mulatto, he worded it in such a way that offended Cuban residents who petitioned for his removal. This made it politically wise for Fleming to remove Dean from office and replace him with a Cuban native, Angel De Lono. This action pleased Democrats, Cubans, Lily Whites and even a group of White republicans within the community. Although the Senate did not remove Dean from office, he was forced to step down because the governor had already appointed a successor.

In the late 1880s, a predominantly White state legislature revoked three city charters, particularly cities with high Black political participation. Notably, Key West's charter was revoked the same year Dean was removed from office. Dean's removal was met some protest. On August 1, 1889, about 800 citizens of Monroe County gathered together regardless of race, nationality, or political affiliation, to sign a petition for Governor Fleming to suspend the executive order which removed Dean from office until he was tried by a fair judge and jury. The petition included 5 pages of signatures, but did not convince the governor to remove his order.

Dean initially refused to resign, maintaining that he had not consciously or willfully violated any law and that those who testified against him deliberately lied in order to remove him from office. Dean explained in a letter to Governor Fleming that if he was in fact guilty of crime, he would willingly submit to the consequences, but in this instance he was innocent meaning he would not step down from his position. Dean wrote a second letter to Fleming one month after his first one again stating again that he would not step down, but this time cited that Governor Fleming had overstepped his powers given to him by the Florida Constitution and so had no authority to remove him from office. Dean even appealed to Florida's Supreme Court to question the legality of the executive order and to sue Angel De Lono (his successor), but was denied a trial. Less than one year after his appointment of Judge, Dean was forced to resign.

== Later life and legacy ==
In 1889, Dean married Victoria J. Brooks Braff. She was about 10 years his senior and had a son from a previous marriage. Their marriage was rocky and short-lived. Following Dean's removal from office, he resumed his law practice. Victoria became violently upset because Dean continued to employ a female copyist that she disliked. Dean filed for divorce, on account of Victoria's temper and physical abuse, but his plea for divorce was overturned by the local judge. Dean himself was then charged with domestic abuse, to which he pleaded guilty and paid a five dollar fine in order to prevent the case from becoming more public than it already had. The case eventually reached Florida's Supreme Court in 1895 and was again overturned.

In 1892, Dean moved to Tampa and took a position as principal, while rebuilding the recently burned-down Harlem Academy building for African American students, and it is believed that Victoria remained in Key West. While there, he became actively involved in the local AME church. He was extended a call to serve in the AME ministry and be ordained a deacon. His ordination as a deacon was contested due his attempts to divorce his wife. While there are few records outlining Dean's consequent participation in the ministry, he did give a speech at Cookman Institute, on behalf of the church in May 1894, called "The Marvelous Progress of Modern Civilization is Due to the Influence of Christianity" and was credited with being a good public speaker. Due to the controversy surrounding his attempted divorce, Dean was reassigned to North Carolina, to preside over the New Bern District of the AME church. He was granted a Doctorate of Divinity Degree and was later appointed to preside over the Western North Carolina Conference from Rocky Mount.

In 1902, Dean sought reconciliation with his wife, as his ministry in the AME church brought him back to Florida, specifically with a reassignment to Pensacola. In Pensacola, he found great success, building a $20,000 church and continuing to fight for better education for African Americans. He also helped to found an organization to support African American businessmen in the community. As part of their efforts to reconcile their marriage, Victoria moved to Pensacola and also became deeply involved in the AME ministry. In 1903, the couple moved to Jacksonville, where Dean began his campaign for the position of secretary of the General Missionary Board, with hopes of becoming an AME bishop. He campaigned against John H Dickerson, an important Floridan African American Masonic leader. While Dean was not granted the position, he was appointed to serve as the Recording Secretary, and the presiding elder of the Fernandina District, upsetting Dickerson who thought he would gain that position. Dean also served as a pastor at the revered Mt. Zion AME church. Benjamin Tucker Tanner, Florida's newly appointed bishop and an ally to Dickerson, reassigned Dean to Ocala, providing Dickerson with a better opportunity for bishopric. In Ocala, Dean published a weekly newspaper called the News Carrier which allowed him to share his positions that he was no longer able to in his limited church position. It had many readers, but was strongly opposed by Tanner and Dickerson and their followers, and Dean had three men arrested for slander and defamation of his paper. Tanner therefore had Dean suspended from his church work in January 1906.

Although all charges against Dean were dropped after a series of trials, Dean decided to leave behind his ministry and begin a law and real estate office. Most African American lawyers at the time had to work another job in addition to the practice of law in order to sustain themselves due to the limitations of Jim Crow laws and discriminatory practices. He also became involved in the affairs of Black businessmen, even overseeing the newly organized Florida chapter of the National Negro Business League which aimed to stimulate Black business and functioned as a Black chamber of commerce. Dean remained in Jacksonville until Victoria's death on March 28, 1910, and they had no children. Following Victoria's death, Dean returned to his work in church and educational affairs, and served as the trustee of Wilberforce University in Jacksonville. He had a continuing hope of becoming a bishop, yet was unsuccessful, and was transferred to a remote position in Dayton in 1912. Following 1912, Dean served in a variety of organizations such as the church's national book concern committee, the Progressive Order of Men and Women, the Colored Bar Association, and the Howard University Alumni Association.

James Dean died on December 19, 1914, at his home in Jacksonville, Florida, and was buried in Wellborn. Due to his significant and well-respected presence in the community, his funeral was well-attended, and tributes were offered by the many organizations of which he was a part, such as the Colored Civic League and the Baptist Minister's Union. News of his death even reached the newspapers of New York.

In 1926, W.E.B Dubois sent J.D. Wetmore to inquire about the late Judge James Dean. Wetmore recounted the controversial details surrounding Dean's removal from office, but also remarked that Dean must have been of weak character to have given up his office, and subsequently his practice of law. Wetmore also commented that while Dean was seen as having a successful political career, he was very conservative and often hesitant to cause contention with White citizens.

Given the controversial nature of his removal as county judge, his judgeship was reinstated long after his death. This act was performed by Florida Gov. Jeb Bush on 26 February 2002. It was decided that the marriage performed was indeed lawful. It was also remarked that the state Senate's adjournment on June 5, 1891 – without having removed Dean from office – meant he should have retained his position.
