= Emmett Jay Scott =

American political advisor (1873–1957)

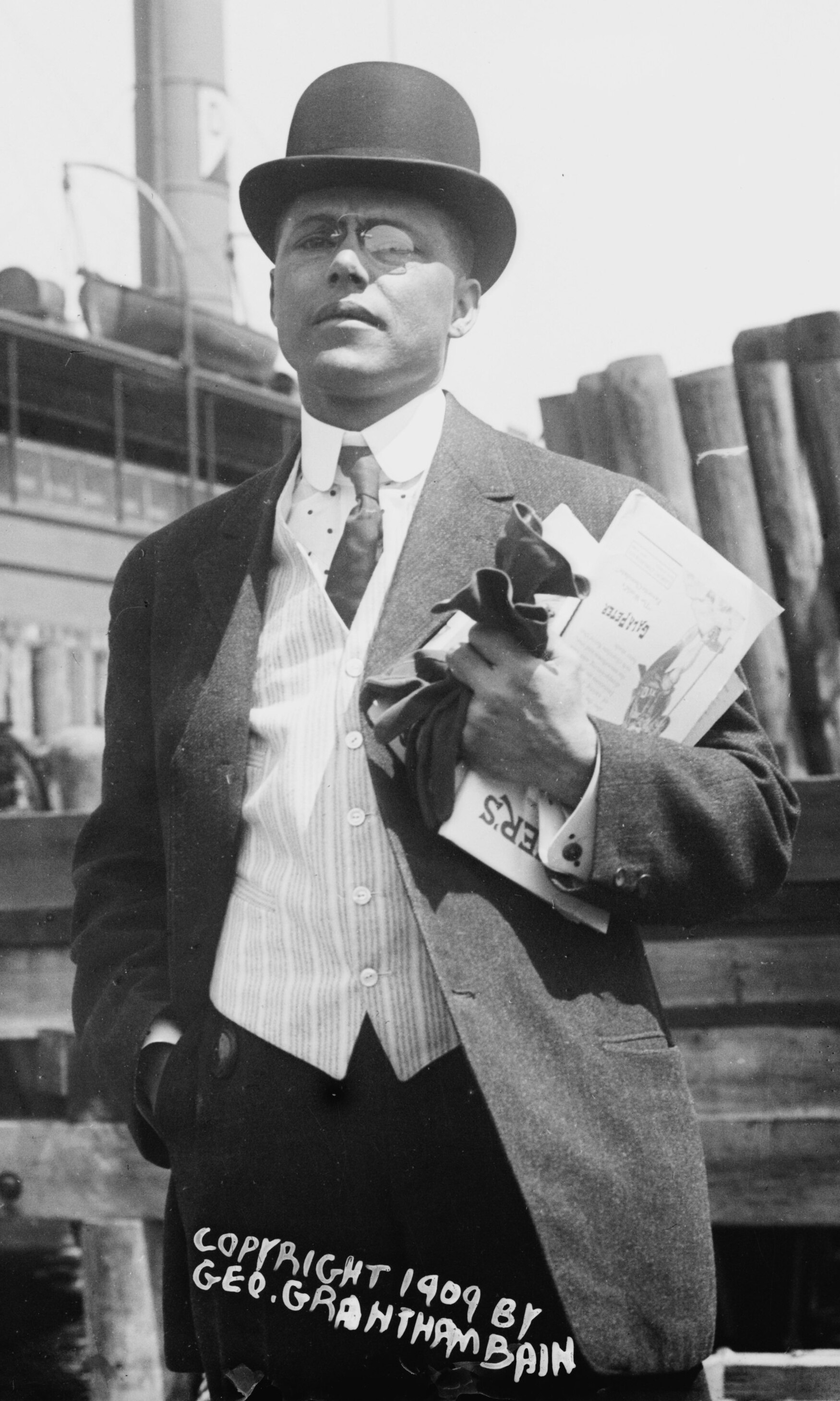
- Scott in 1909
- Born: February 13, 1873; Houston, Texas, U.S.
- Died: December 12, 1957 (aged 84); Washington, D.C., U.S.
- Occupations: Political advisor, educator, publicist
- Political party: Republican

Emmett Jay Scott (February 13, 1873 – December 12, 1957) was an African American journalist, newspaper editor, academic, and government official who was Booker T. Washington's closest advisor at the Tuskegee Institute. He was responsible for maintaining Washington's nationwide "Tuskegee machine," with its close links to black business leadership, white philanthropists, and Republican politicians from the local level to the White House.

After Washington's death, Scott lost his Tuskegee connection, but moved to Washington, D.C., as Special Advisor of Black Affairs to Secretary of War Newton D. Baker. Scott was the highest-ranking African American in Democrat Woodrow Wilson's presidential administration. After 1919, he was less and less visible in national affairs, with the NAACP largely assuming the leadership role that Booker T. Washington had dominated.

== Biography ==
=== Early life and education ===
Emmett Jay Scott was born in Houston, Texas, in 1873, the son of former slaves Horace Lacy Scott and Emma Kyle. He began his studies at Wiley College in 1887, but left 3 years later to pursue a career in journalism.

=== Journalism ===
Scott worked at the white-owned The Houston Post as a janitor before working his way up to messenger and eventually reporter. He and friends knew that the city's African-American community was not receiving adequate coverage. Scott joined Charles N. Love and Jack Tibbitto in founding Houston's first African-American newspaper, the Texas Freeman. Scott became editor soon after the newspaper began circulation. His leadership expanded the Texas Freeman's presence in the Houston region, making it a prominent publication throughout Texas.

=== Tuskegee Institute activities ===
In Houston Scott promoted Booker T. Washington, who was developing the Tuskegee Institute. Washington was impressed and in 1897 hired Scott as his personal secretary, publicity chief and top advisor. Scott had a major role in management of the college, fundraising, and building Washington's national networks of black businessmen and white philanthropists. Indeed he was known as the “Architect of the Tuskegee Machine.”

On the side Scott was a real estate investor with ties to the banking and insurance industries. He was a founder of the National Negro Business League in 1900 and served as Secretary of that organization from its establishment until 1922.

Scott served as Secretary of the Tuskegee Institute from 1912 until 1917. Scott was also selected as Secretary of the International Congress of the Negro, a conference hosted by the Tuskegee Institute in 1912. Although he was heir apparent to take the helm as principal of Tuskegee Institute following Washington's death in 1915, the trustees passed over Scott to name Robert Russa Moton, formerly of the Hampton Institute, to the position.

=== Liberia ===
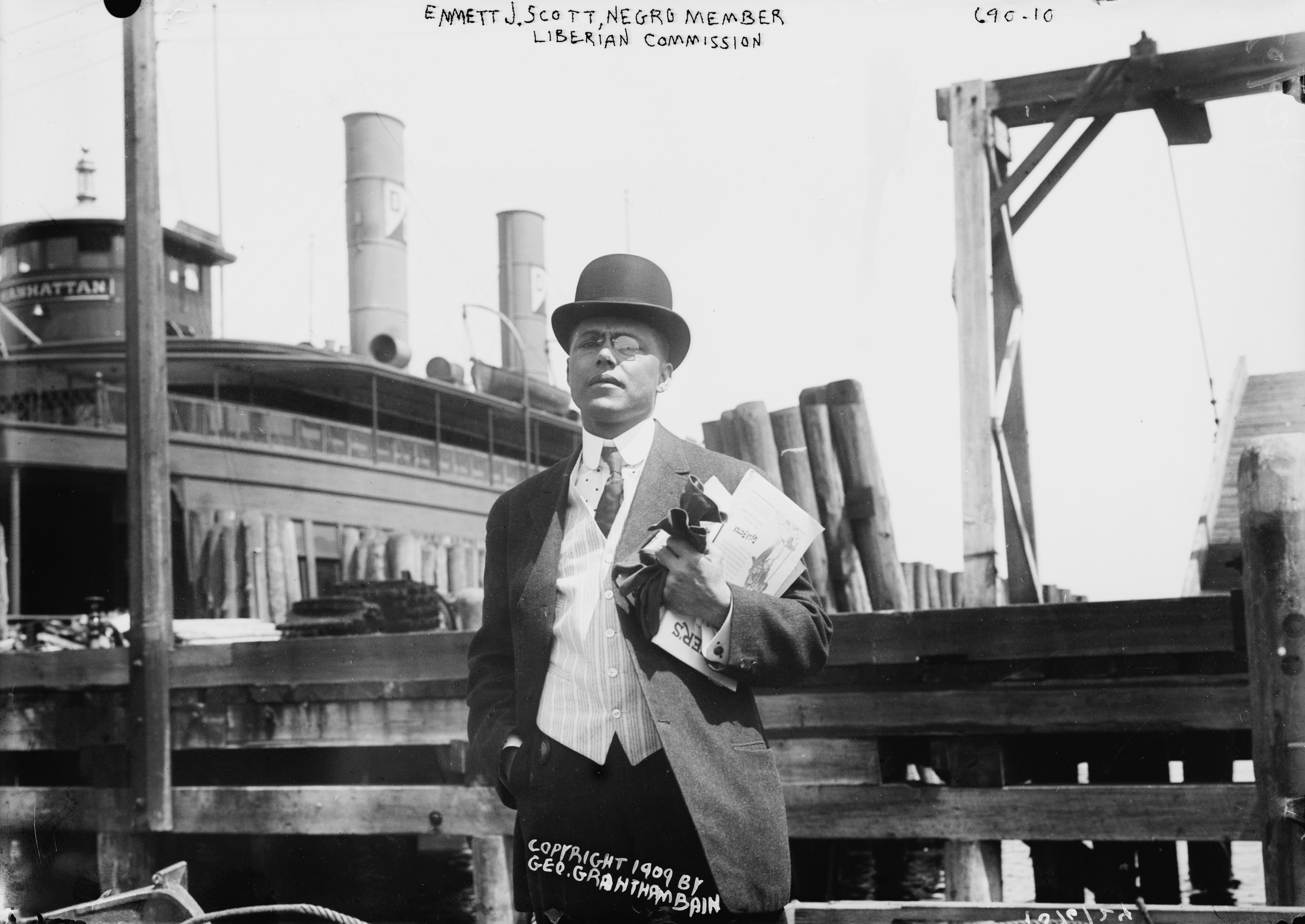
Scott as a member of the president's Liberia Commission, 1909

In 1909, Scott was tapped by President William Howard Taft as one of three American commissioners to Liberia. Scott reported as part of a group sent to the country from the U.S. government. He worked with Booker T. Washington and took his place after Washington determined travel to Liberia would take him away from his other work for too long.

=== World War I activity ===
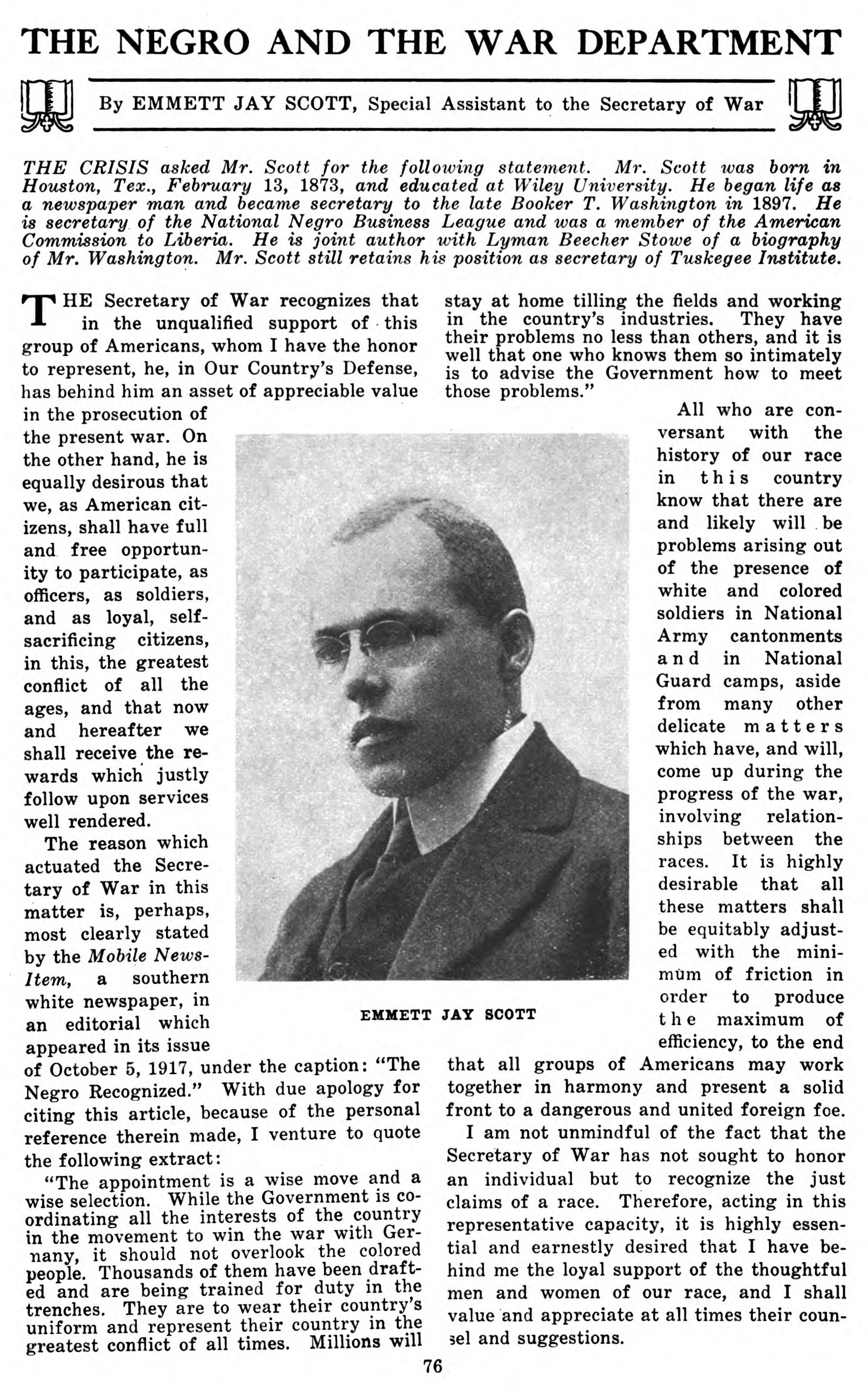
"The Negro and the War Department," an article by Scott published in The Crisis, December 1917

After the election of President Woodrow Wilson, as the United States moved closer to war, Scott was appointed as Special Assistant for Negro Affairs to the Secretary of War Newton D. Baker. Scott was the highest-ranking African-American in the administration. He selected William Henry Davis to serve as his own assistant and staff manager, helping to ensure blacks were treated fairly by the War Department.

In June 1918, Scott organized a meeting of African-American journalists and business leaders to recommend a Black journalist to the U.S. War Department for reporting on the Negro troops in World War I. Ralph Waldo Tyler was selected to report on the Black troops at the front, and he became the first African-American foreign war correspondent. Tyler's reports were screened by the U.S. Committee on Public Information, then they were reviewed by Scott. He selected letters to be syndicated through the Black press.

After the war, Scott wrote his own history of this period, Scott's Official History of the American Negro in the World War (1919) featuring a preface by Secretary Baker and foreword by General John Pershing.

=== Later career ===
After leaving the War Department in 1919, Scott was named Secretary-Treasurer of Howard University, a position he held until 1933, at which time the Treasurer position was split off. He quarreled with the president and was forced out in 1938.

Scott remained active in Republican politics as a liaison with the black community. He served as an advisor to the public relations staff for every Republican National Convention from 1928 through 1948. He was a paid assistant publicity director of the Republican National Committee from 1939 to 1942. During World War II, Scott was director of employment and personnel relations for Shipyard No. 4 of the Sun Ship Co. in Chester, Pennsylvania. He was a joiner who served on many committees, such as the United States Liberian Commission. He also authored several books. Scott died in Washington, D.C., in 1957.

== Legacy ==
Historian Eugene Berwanger argues that Scott was in line to succeed Booker T. Washington as the nation's leading African-American spokesman after Washington's death in 1915, but failed to take advantage of that opportunity, allowing the NAACP to instead fill that leadership role. Scott's visibility gradually faded out, apart from within black educational circles. Berwanger suggests the cause was in large part because he insisted on adhering to Washington's accommodation philosophy and refused to support issues popular in the black leadership community, especially national anti-lynching legislation. He lacked Washington's optimism and drive and broad vision; instead, Scott demonstrated expertise in public relations when Washington called the tune but was unable to take the initiative after Washington was gone.

Morgan State University maintains a collection of Scott's papers. His letters to various parties are a valuable historical resource cited in many works.

== See also ==
- Drusilla Nixon, his assistant
