= Olivewood Cemetery =

Cemetery in Houston, Texas

Coordinates: 29.774°N 95.392°W

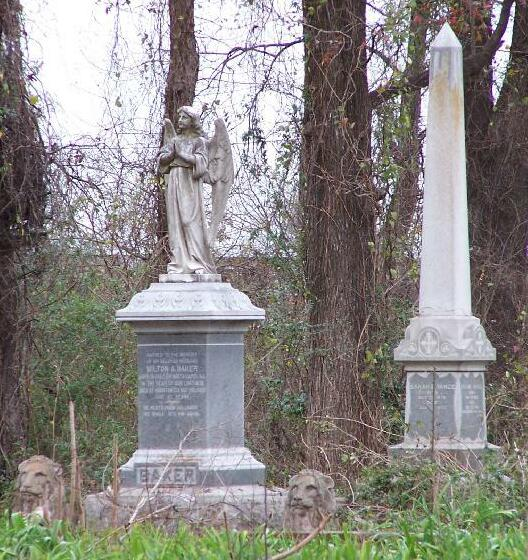
- Headstones at Olivewood
- Interactive map of Olivewood Cemetery

Details
- Established: 1877
- Location: Houston, Texas
- Type: Historic African American cemetery
- Size: 6 acres (2.4 ha)

Olivewood Cemetery, in Houston, Texas, lies near a bend in White Oak Bayou, along the rail line to Chaney Junction, where the First and Sixth wards meet just northwest of downtown. The 6-acre (24,000 m^{2}) cemetery is an historic resting place for many freed slaves and some of Houston's earliest black residents. It was listed on the National Register of Historic Places in 2026.

== History ==
In 1875, the land, which had previously been used for slave burials, was purchased by Richard Brock, Houston's first black alderman. It opened as a cemetery for black Methodists in 1877. When Olivewood was platted, it was the first African Americans burial ground within the Houston city limits.

Many 19th century influential African Americans were buried in the cemetery, including Reverend Elias Dibble, first minister of Trinity United Methodist Church; Reverend Wade H. Logan, also a minister of the church; and James Kyle, a blacksmith; as well as Richard Brock.

The cemetery includes more than 700 family plots around a graceful, elliptical drive that originated at an ornate entry gate. It contains graves of both the well-to-do and those who died in poverty; therefore, the grave markers run the gamut from elaborate Victorian monuments to simple, handmade headstones. Burials at Olivewood Cemetery continued through the 1960s.

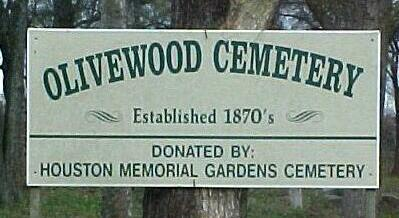
Olivewood Cemetery sign

In 2003, after decades of neglect and abandonment, the "Descendants of Olivewood," a nonprofit organization, was established to take guardianship of the cemetery, "to provide care and to protect its historical significance."

Olivewood was designated an Historic Texas Cemetery. By 2010 water and vandals threatened to damage graves in a portion of the cemetery.

One of the larger genealogical projects headed to preserve the Cemetery occurred from January, 2010 to May, 2010. The project was headed as a part of an Eagle Scout project for The Boy Scouts of America. Chad Roye, led a team of Boyscouts over 300 man hours to clear 4500 square feet of undergrowth. They managed to record roughly 80% of the cemeteries residents for genealogical records in collaboration with Leigh Anne Roye, a renowned genealogy expert and local Houston native.

In 2013, a digital database for the cemetery was created (many memorials were created using the death certificates found at www.familysearch.org). This database consists mostly of the years 1910–1940 and can be found at www.findagrave.com (link listed below). This database has about 3,800 memorials and can be searched by using first and/or last names.

On July 15, 2021, the National Trust for Historic Preservation announced Olivewood Cemetery as one of 40 sites and organizations to receive $3 Million in grants from the African American Cultural Heritage Action Fund. The grant was awarded to create a master drainage plan to help mitigate further damage due to flooding and erosion caused by commercial development in the area.

== Hauntings ==
Over the years, there have been numerous reports of mysterious after-dark sightings and strange movements within the graveyard.

Cathi Bunn, a paranormal investigator, began exploring Olivewood in 1999. One moonlit midnight, Bunn said she videotaped the ghost of Mary White, who was buried in 1888, hovering above her headstone.

== Notable burials ==
- Richard Allen (1830–1909) Texas politician, founder of Houston's Emancipation Park in 1872
- John Brown Bell (1858–1917) businessman, real estate investor, and civic leader in Houston, formerly enslaved
- J. Vance Lewis (c. 1853–1925) lawyer, formerly enslaved
- Jack Yates (1828–1897) Baptist minister, community leader; later reinterred at College Park Cemetery in Houston
