= James Garneth Carter =

American diplomat, business manager (1877–1949)

- Born: December 15, 1877; Brunswick, Georgia, U.S.
- Died: March 9, 1949 (aged 71); Chicago, Illinois, U.S.
- Resting place: Rosedale Cemetery, Los Angeles, California, U.S.
- Other name: James G. Carter
- Occupations: Diplomat, merchant, business manager of a newspaper

James Garneth Carter (December 15, 1877 – March 9, 1949) was an African American U.S. diplomatic official, merchant, and business manager. Among his diplomatic posts, he served as American consul in Tamatave (now Toamasina), Madagascar and Calais and Bordeaux, France.

== Life and career ==
James Garneth Carter was born on December 15, 1877, in Brunswick, Georgia. In his early life he worked as a tailor, newspaper manager, postal worker, and merchant.

Carter was appointed as a consular official by President Theodore Roosevelt, shortly after Elihu Root's 1906 consular reforms. Carter served as consul in Tamatave (now Toamasina) from 1906 until 1916; in Tananarive (now Antananarivo) from 1916 until 1927; and then in France in Calais from 1927 until 1940; in Bordeaux in 1940. He returned to Madagascar as U.S. Consul General in Tananarive from 1941 until 1942. He declined a posting to Liberia in 1927. He also served in Sivas, Turkey.

He sent samples of Madagascar beans (red, white and red and white) from Madagascar. He reported in the opening of the Madagascar Railway. He also reported on the extent of belting and the effect of tariffs in American belts. He also reported on the island of Reunion.

According to then Assistant Secretary of State for Administration Donald Russell, while Carter was stationed in Calais during the 1940 German invasion of France, instead of retreating with the French he drove a car into German territory, followed the Rhine River upstream and drove into Switzerland.

He and his wife had a daughter Hewlett Amelia Carter born on December 24, 1923, at Tananarive in Madagascar.

Carter was a member of the National Negro Business League. In his late life Carter lived in San Francisco.

Carter died on March 9, 1949 in Chicago, while he was traveling. He was interred at Rosedale Cemetery (now Angelus-Rosedale Cemetery) in Los Angeles.
