= J. Vance Lewis =

American lawyer

Joseph Vance Lewis
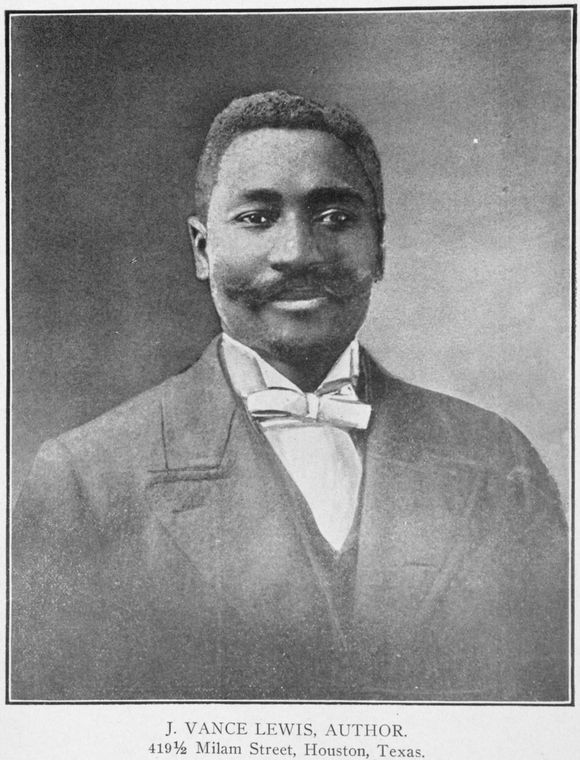
- J. Vance Lewis, 1910
- Born: December 25, 1853? Terrebonne Parish, Louisiana
- Died: April 24, 1925; Houston, Texas
- Occupation: American lawyer

Joseph Vance Lewis (December 25, 1853? – April 24, 1925), was an enslaved American who was freed through emancipation and who came "out of the ditch" to become a lawyer and was admitted to the US Supreme Court. Lewis wrote an autobiographical narrative entitled Out of the Ditch. A True Story of an Ex-Slave. (Note: The introduction describes Lewis's intentions in writing his autobiography: The readers of this book may think it strange that we call it "Out of the Ditch," but it is a description of actual scenes and occurrences. Under slave conditions the author would have lived and died, both figuratively and actually, "in the ditch." Under condition of emancipation there was a chance to climb out and fight for life and liberty. This book contains a picture of slavery on a gigantic scale. There were many slave owners who were as thoughtful and as sympathetic as Mr. Cage and his son. There were some who were not and this difference in temperament as well as the difference of wealth and blood, led to the paradoxical views which the world held of slavery. I have written this little book not because I felt that there was serious need of another book, nor because I wish to boast of my own personal achievement, but because I felt that my struggles might inspire other boys to pursue their highest aspirations and be proof against discouragement. The stumbling blocks placed in my pathway may be laid in yours and if this book helps you to avoid them it will have accomplished its mission. I felt that "Out of the Ditch" might shed new light upon some of the difficult phases of the Negro problem, and might be the means of helping to change certain adverse conditions for the better. You will find some mistakes in the book, you may intice its leteran merits, but I am sure you will approve of its sincerity. Naturally in a work of this kind I have employed a good bit of ego, but I saw no way to avoid it in a simple relation of facts. Beseeching you to read carefully, and ponder thoughtfully every phase of the author's struggles and the causes therefor, whether of prejudice, jealousy, envy or conspiracy, we send this book into the world. Deal with it charitably and try to see the good rather than the bad it may contain. Into the warp and woof of every book the author weaves much that even the subtlest readers cannot fathom, far less understand. To such it is but a cross and a tangle of threads, but there is a golden thread running through the whole. Follow it and you will enter the spirit of "Out of the Ditch." — J. VANCE LEWIS")

== Slave life ==
According to his autobiography, J. Vance Lewis was born on Christmas Day (according to his narrative he would have been born in approximately 1853, but the actual date was more than likely ten or more years later, as will be discussed below) to Doc and Rosa Lewis. The Lewis family were slaves on the plantation of Colonel Duncan Stewart Cage Sr. in Terrebonne Parish, Louisiana near the town of Houma. Born into slavery, Lewis knew no other life. When he was about ten years old, the Emancipation Proclamation of 1863 brought about the realization that he was a slave.

The rejoicing and excitement surrounding freedom provoked the consciousness of how miserable his parents and everyone else had been on the plantation. Lewis was depressed at this point, he did not see himself being freed, but saw freedom as being forced from the life he knew; the plantation was his home.

The farm consisted of what seemed to Lewis to be hundreds of slaves. All those who had worked the plantation prior to the Emancipation Proclamation were given the option to stay by Colonel Cage, who claimed to be a "poor man" without them. About two hundred former slaves remained and resumed the work they had done previously as paid employees.

Soon after slaves were transformed into employees, an Irishman by the name of Jimmie Welch was hired to be an "overseer". Most of the workers hated him. In an attempt to win the favor of the workers and to keep his power, Welch offered the following:

It now becomes my very pleasant duty to bestow upon you certain gifts, as evidence of the appreciation of your excellent service. To every married man, by the authority vested in me by Mr. Cage, I give a pig, which you may go to the hog lot and select for yourself; to every woman, who will come to the commissary, I will give a head handkerchief and a pair of stockings; to every boy and every girl I will give a half gallon of molasses and a ginger cake; to every grandparent a cob pipe and a sack of tobacco.

When everyone was dismissed from the gathering where Welch had made this announcement, a man named Rev. Frank Benjamin went to go kill his pig. Welch claimed that Benjamin killed the biggest hog in the pen, which angered Welch who charged Franklin with hog theft, because he promised a pig, not a hog.

Lewis's father, Doc Lewis, was appointed to be the judge in this case. This appears to have been J. Vance Lewis's first exposure to the legal system and its place in his narrative implies that it had some significant influence in the outcome of his future. His father had served well in the trial, and his final word about when a pig becomes a hog convinced the jury that Benjamin was innocent. Benjamin had testified that he killed the pig after he had seen it nursing. After the trial, J. Vance Lewis overheard Mr. Cage remark that Doc was a "born lawyer".

== Education ==
Eventually, a public school for the African-American children on the plantation was founded by Lewis's father, the "overseer" Mr. Welch, and Mr. Cage who hired a teacher, a West Indian.

Lewis was an excellent student, friendly and competitive with a boy named Warner Wright, who was nicknamed "Dick." Up until the day when Lewis's parents died and he was left an orphan, he believed he had an advantage at school, but without parents he had no one to encourage and support him in his schooling.

A few years later, Warner went off to New Orleans to attend Leland University, living out Lewis's dream. Lewis was crushed and "longed to go with him." He stayed at home and it was not long before Warner came home to visit. The college student had an arrogant air about him that Lewis did not appreciate. "Dick" was no more; he only allowed people to call him by his proper name. Soon Lewis was motivated to go to school and prove that he could surpass Warner in education and remain the same genuine person he had always been.

Lewis saved a total of 64 dollars from working on the plantation. He headed off to college and made arrangements to work out the rest of his tuition. There he met up with Warner, and in the college setting, things had changed: Warner was "Dick" again and Lewis forgave him everything. They became friends throughout their time at Leland University.

(Warner Richard Wright became a teacher, school principal and the owner of a pharmacy in the city of Alexandria, Louisiana. He married and fathered no less than nine children, many of whom he named after famous African Americans. One of his sons, Crispus Attucks Wright, moved west to Los Angeles and became noted as a lawyer with offices on Wilshire Boulevard in Beverly Hills, California as well as a civil rights activist who in 1997 contributed US$2 million (~$3.62 million in 2024) to the law school of the University of Southern California.)

== After college ==
After completing his courses at Leland University, Lewis decided to get his teaching certificate at Orange, Texas. He then began to teach in Angelina County, Texas, at Cripple Creek School—a school with a bad reputation. Lewis mainly took the job so that he could get the financial status to finish his schooling and follow his dream of becoming a lawyer.

He continued to work as a school teacher and principal in east Texas before attending Lincoln University (Pennsylvania) for two terms. Through advice from a successful African-American lawyer, Lewis then decided to finish his education at a school in Ann Arbor, Michigan. He graduated in 1894 and was admitted to the Supreme Court of Michigan. After attending Chicago College of Law he was admitted to every court in Illinois.

Lewis decided to apply for admittance to the bar of the United States Supreme Court and on October 11, 1897, he received a letter that read:

Washington, D. C., October 11, 1897.

J. V. Lewis, Chicago, Ill.

Dear Sir: Your application for admittance to the bar of the Supreme Court of the United States, has been duly filed, and you are hereby notified to be present November 22nd, along with other applicants, in the chamber of the Supreme Court at Washington, on the above date. Chief Justice Harlan will administer the oath.

Yours truly,

M. M. GRAY.

Lewis was one of 18 lawyers accepted; he was the only African American admitted.

Lewis practiced law in Chicago until 1900, when he moved, first to New Orleans, and then to Houston, Texas, where he soon established a thriving practice.

== Discrepancies in age ==
Although Lewis implies that he was at least ten years of age at the time of the Emancipation Proclamation, there is strong evidence that he was born the same year that the Proclamation was issued, throwing into doubt the story he paints of his realization of being a slave.

The 1870 census enumeration for the Eleventh Ward of Terrebonne Parish, Louisiana lists a seven-year-old mulatto boy named "Jousille" Lewis as a member of the household headed by illiterate farm laborer "Doctor" Lewis and his wife Rose. Vance Lewis' friend Warner Richard Wright's birthdate was January 1864 and that year is reflected in the 1870 census enumeration for Terrebonne's Eleventh Ward.

If Lewis's actual birthdate is December 25, 1863, rather than 1853, he would have been 16 months old at the end of the American Civil War and have had no memory of his life in slavery.

However, census enumerations and other public records show that, at times, Lewis used either 1868 or 1869 as his date of birth; 1868 is reflected on his grave marker and some census returns; when he applied for a United States passport in 1903 Lewis stated that his birth date was December 25, 1869.

== Family and last years ==
Lewis was married four times, although he only mentions one of his marriages in his autobiography. On April 21, 1891, he married Martha Henderson in Jefferson County, Texas; they had two daughters; Sadie Rosanna Lewis, born 3-23-in Louisiana and Lillian Novenia Lewis born 2-14- in Texas. It appears that this marriage ended in divorce. In 1897, he married Laura Jane McDonald in Calvert, Texas; he also had two daughters from this marriage, and this marriage, too, appears to have ended in divorce. On May 13, 1905, Lewis married Pauline R. Gray in Houston, Texas; he describes her in the autobiography as "my dear little wife, the one who stood by me during the time of all my troubles"; however, it also appears that this marriage, like the others, ended in divorce, for in 1914, he married, for a fourth and last time, Amanda D. Rogers, by whom he had a daughter.

J. Vance Lewis died in Houston in 1925 and is buried at Olivewood Cemetery.
