= Nathan Thomas Velar =

American elected official (1858–1928)

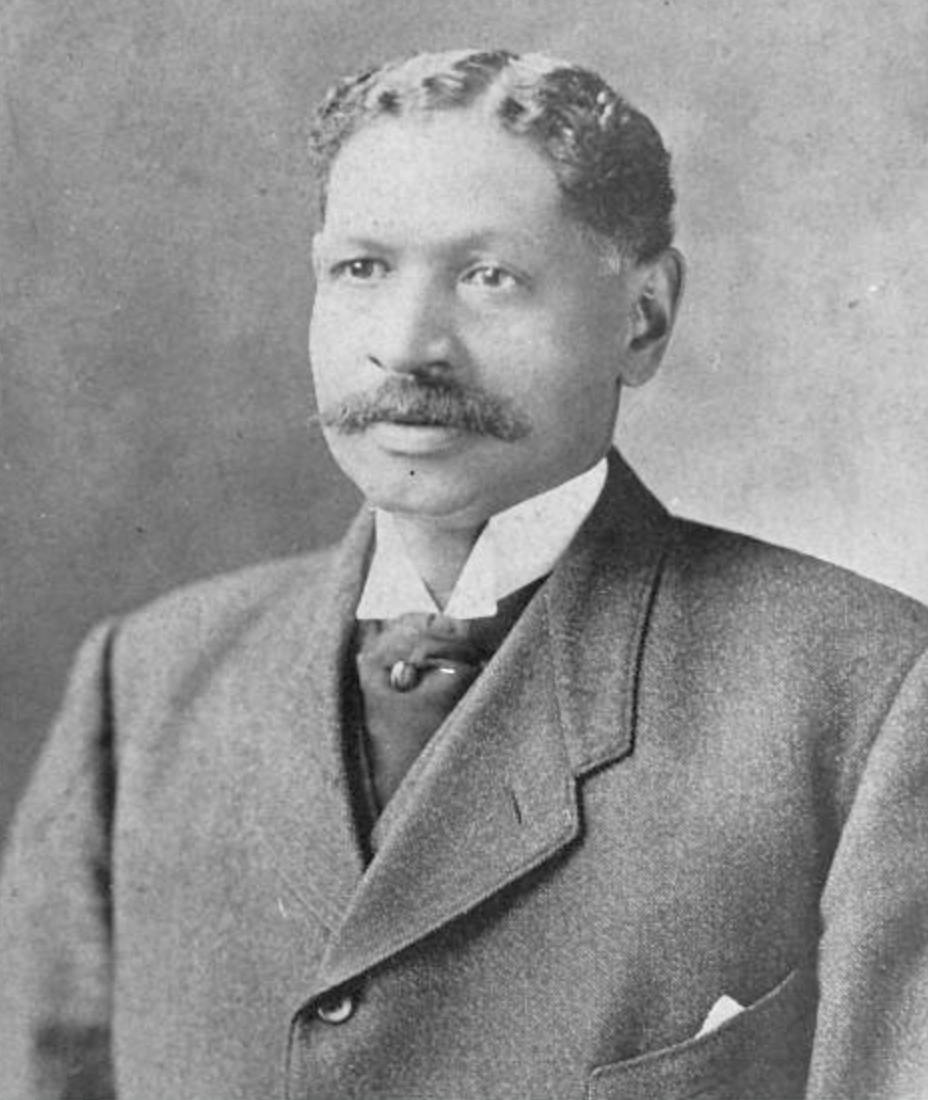
- Born: September 12, 1858; Fredericktown, Missouri, U.S.
- Died: August 21, 1928 (aged 69); Pittsburgh, Pennsylvania, U.S.
- Resting place: All Saints Braddock Catholic Cemetery, Pittsburgh, Pennsylvania, U.S.
- Occupations: Postmaster, civic leader, elected official, businessman, merchant, wire drawer
- Political party: Republican
- Spouse: Mary Louisa Amoureux (m. 1882–1928; his death)
- Children: 11

Nathan Thomas Velar (September 12, 1858 – August 21, 1928), also known as N. T. Velar, was an American postmaster, civic leader, businessman, and elected official. By the late 19th-century, he was the first and only Black postmaster in the State of Pennsylvania. Velar served on the executive committee of Booker T. Washington's National Negro Business League.

== Early life ==
Nathan Thomas Velar was born on September 12, 1858, in Fredericktown, Missouri. As a child his family moved to Sparta, Illinois, later followed by a move to Rankin, Pennsylvania.

He married Mary Louisa Amoureux in 1882, and together they had 11 children.

== Career ==
From 1887 to 1893, Velar worked as a wire drawer at Braddock Wire & Steel Company (later Consolidated Wire & Steel Company) in Braddock, Pennsylvania. This was followed by work at Carnegie Steel Company in Pittsburgh, Pennsylvania.

In 1893, Velar moved to Brinton in East Pittsburgh, Pennsylvania, where he served as the postmaster for ten years from April 29, 1897 until August 1907. He was the first and only Black postmaster in the state of Pennsylvania by the late 19th-century.

He also owned and operated a general store on Bessemer Avenue in East Pittsburgh. In 1889, he was elected as a school director, and a year later he was elected as a member of the Borough Council of Rankin.

Velar was a member of the Afro-American Republican Club of Allegheny, and served as the organization's president in 1904. Velar served on the executive committee of the National Negro Business League founded by Booker T. Washington, and held a lifetime membership.

Velar died on August 21, 1928, in Pittsburgh, and was buried at All Saints Braddock Catholic Cemetery.
