= Sam Aleckson =

African-American freedman and author (c. 1852–1946)

- Born: Samuel Williams c. 1852; Charleston, South Carolina, US
- Died: c. 1946; Massachusetts, US
- Spouse(s): Mary Artson Williams (first); H. Williams (second)
- Children: Susan Cox; Samuel B. Williams
- Relatives: Alexander Williams (father) Susan Williams (mother); Samuel Williams (grandfather); Clement Williams (great grandfather); Alice Williams (sister); Louisa Williams (sister) Robert C. Williams (brother)
- Writing career
- Notable works: Before the War and After the Union: An Autobiography

Samuel Williams (c. 1852 – 1946?), better known by his pen name Sam Aleckson, was an American emancipated and author of Before the War and After the Union: An Autobiography. Written in 1914 and published in 1929, his memoir gives a rare look into the lives of urban enslaved people in North America and the ways freedmen negotiated their ways through Reconstruction and into the 20th century.

== Biographical overview ==
Like his father, Alexander Williams, his mother, Susan Williams, and his grandfather of the same name, Samuel Williams was born into slavery in about 1852 in Charleston, South Carolina. His great-grandfather, Clement Williams, was brought from Africa in the Atlantic slave trade. Samuel Williams had the great fortune of being taught the three "R's" by his owners. Once freed, he used his literacy to document his life and obtained publication in 1929. Williams quotes Shakespeare to readers of his autobiography by drawing from Othello: "I will a plain unvarnished tale deliver," a line often used in slave narratives but powerful here. The humbleness of this phrase belies a thoughtful, complex life story. While his memoir was actually published in 1929, Williams claims to have composed it in 1914 during a time when he feared he might go blind and wanted to document his life before that occurred. However, he did not go blind, and lived on for several more decades, most likely dying in Massachusetts in 1946.

== Before the War ==
In his narrative, Williams states: "The place of my birth and the conditions under which I was born are matters over which, of course, I had no control. If I had, I should have altered the conditions, but I should not have changed the place; for it is a grand old city, and I have always felt proud of my citizenship." His mother and father were owned by separate families. Like many enslaved children, Williams sometimes lived in a family unit and sometimes did not; he lived in the households of both his father's enslavers for a good part of the time. During his early childhood, his mother and older brother worked with her owners while he remained in his grandmother's care because he was too young for any practical use.

Williams held some good memories of his early years, saying that of the family that enslaved him and his relatives, they were "of all slave holders, the very best." The younger children had almost all of their time free to play. Early on, Williams would play with the neighbor's white children, and later with other black children on the plantation that to which he moved. He made clear, however, that "There is nothing good to be said of American slavery. I know it is sometimes customary to speak of its bright and its dark sides. I am not prepared to admit that it had any bright sides, unless it was the Emancipation Proclamation issued by President Abraham Lincoln..."

In his early childhood, while the four white children Williams played with were at school, Williams was taught how to read and write by the three unmarried white ladies who were most likely part of the family that enslaved Williams' father. He was taught using only one book, which he called "Thomas Dilworth's," referring to A New Guide to the English Tongue by Thomas Dilworth. From the book, Williams claims he learned about grammar, weights and measures, ciphers, and morals. In addition, Williams describes the popular use of slates for his lessons, as well as his fascination with fable illustrations that instructed what was moral and what was not: "...such as that of the man who prayed to Hercules to take his wagon out of the mire; of the two men who stole a piece of meat; of the lazy maids and of the kindhearted man who took a half frozen serpent into his house." He also states many slaves were punished for being found in possession of the schoolbook, though the reward of mastering the book was being considered a "prodigy of learning" within the slave community.

Of his owner, Williams stated: "Mr. Ward was what was called a 'good master.' His people were well-fed, well-housed, and not over-worked. There were certain inflexible rules however, governing his plantation of which he allowed not the slightest infraction, for he had his place for the Negro... His place for the Negro was in subjection and servitude to the white man." Williams alludes to his master's classism, pointing out that his white supremacy ideology did not extend to all whites and that there were some he would have barred from slaveholding. Ward, like many other slaveholders, asserted his role as owner and enslaver with a paternalistic view. He provided well for his slaves while demanding complete obedience. Ward, for example, took care to always know their whereabouts by insisting he authorize any departure from his land and as Williams depicts in his memoir, Ward had no qualms about punishing those slaves he felt defied him.

As a boy, Williams learned to ride horses from one of his enslavers. Williams states, "He taught me to ride, and when I could sit my horse well 'bare-back' he had a saddle made for me at the then famous 'McKinzie's' saddlery, sign of the 'White Horse' at the corner of Church and Chalmers Street." This training to ride was not wholly unique to Williams' experience. In fact, enslaved people were essential to the world of horse racing in the American South. Jockeys and trainers were commonly enslaved people. Despite limited privileges, these enslaved horse riders were still subjected to the realities of being slaves in a slave society. Williams never became a formal jockey, however, and of this he says the following: "Possibly Mr. Dane had 'views', concerning me for he owned several fast horses, but before I was old enough to be of practical service, 'Sherman came marching through Georgia.'"

== During the War ==
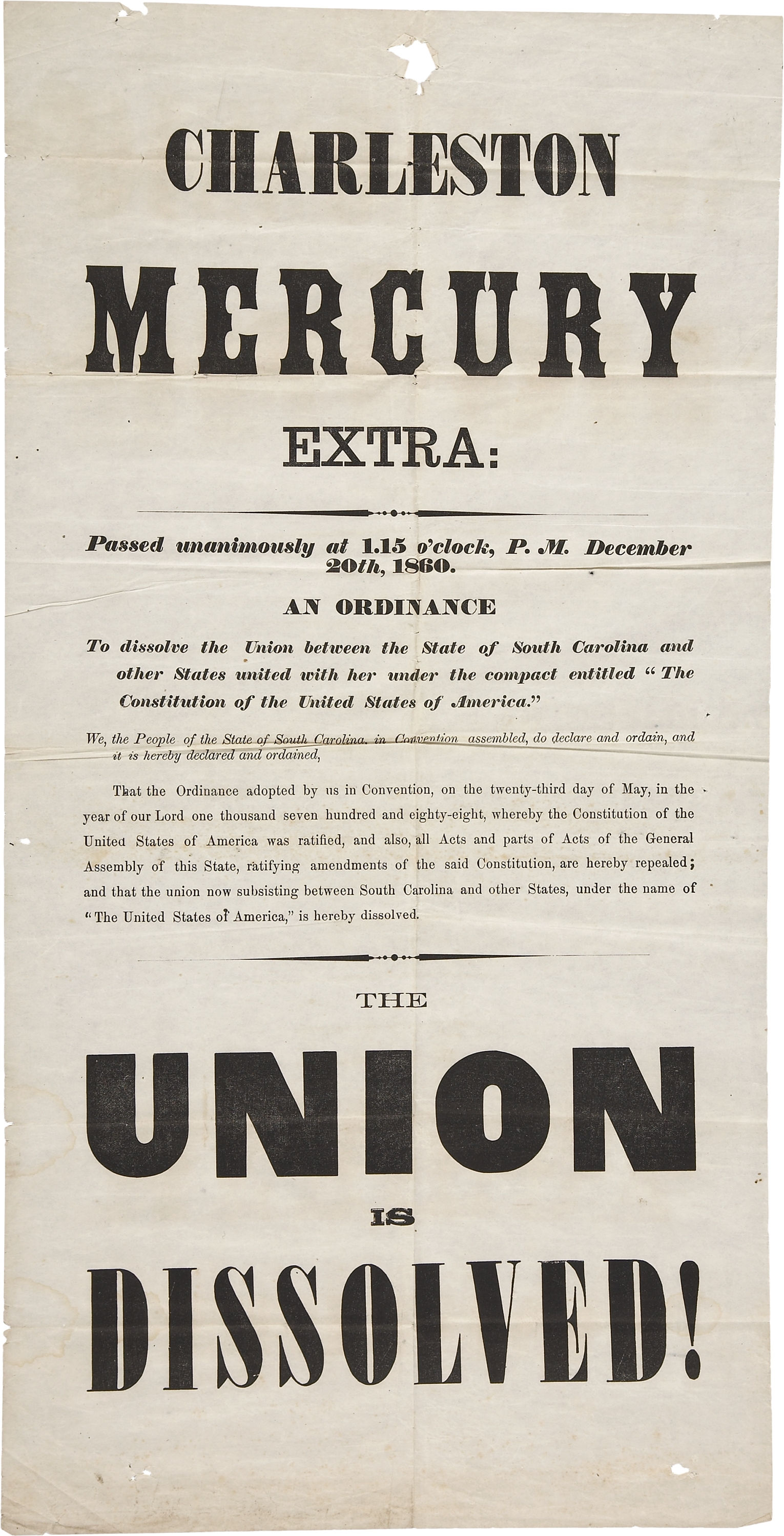
1860 Charleston newspaper informing about the dissolution of the Union

Williams recounts his arriving in Charleston one day to find that "men were going about the streets wearing blue cockades on the lapels of their coats." This was his first realization that there was a war going on, though the effects (amazingly high prices for everything and the disappearance of many of the young men to go fight) had been felt for a while. Williams recounts the conversations between other enslaved men and women at this time regarding the impending war and their support of the Union officer General Robert Anderson's defense of Fort Sumter.

Free and enslaved African Americans were barred from being soldiers in the Confederacy. However, after Williams' older brother died of fever, the 10-year-old Williams took his brother's place as a Confederate officer's "boy," running errands and doing domestic tasks for the officers. "And here I must admit I wore the 'gray,' Williams recalled. "I have never attended any of the Confederate reunions. I suppose they overlooked my name on the army roll!"

Williams' childhood home on Guignard Street was destroyed by the Great Charleston Fire on December 11, 1861. This fire destroyed many of the main landmarks such as the Charleston Circular Church and Institute Hall where the Ordinance of Secession was signed, and Williams remembered it to be the biggest blaze he would ever see in Charleston. Remembering the event in his memoir, Williams describes how "the sparks seemed to rain down as we ran." His memoir serves as an eye-witness account of the chaos and fear created by the Great Fire.

== After the War ==
Once the Confederates surrendered, life in South Carolina changed dramatically for Williams and his family. They were reunited under one roof; Alexander Williams and his family resided on Princess Street in Charleston for many years.

Williams' account of this era includes reflections about the "Black Code" or laws passed to restrict civil and social rights of freedmen. He wondered why, at least in his time when writing his memoir in the 20th century, one did not hear much about this, saying that perhaps "somebody is ashamed of it."

In 1876, Williams' employer asked him to vote for General Wade Hampton. Williams chose not to vote in the election at all, even though he heard the General speak: "Our only desire he said, was to save our dear old state from utter ruin. Then, raising his right hand to heaven he said these very words as near as I can recollect, "If I am elected governor, I swear to God that not one right or privilege that you now enjoy shall be taken from you!" Williams also noted that many of the promises that General Hampton made did not come to fruition and that, in fact, acts of disenfranchisement and Jim Crow laws were being enacted against blacks during this era.

Sometime in the 1880s, Williams moved to Vermont (he appears to have moved initially to Springfield, Vermont) and soon sent for his second wife and children (several from his first marriage and perhaps some step children or children from his second wife) to join him. While not much is known about his life in Vermont, he and his eldest daughter Susan show up in the 1910 census, living in Lebanon, New Hampshire, where they worked as servants for the Carter family. In Vermont, both worked for author Thomas H. Thomas. They were listed in the 1920 United States Federal Census, living in Windsor with the Thomas family.

Williams appears to have moved to Cambridge, Massachusetts, in the 1920s with his daughter Susan, who married an African-American lawyer/dentist named William Alexander Cox. Cox was also heavily involved in the National Negro Business League.

== Autobiography ==
After an illness weakened Williams' eyes and he feared going blind, he decided to record events from his past. He was also motivated in writing his memoir by the desire to remind future generations of African Americans of the cruel experience of slavery, a reason disclosed in the memoir's preface:

"It is a remarkable fact that very many of the immediate descendants of those who passed through the trying ordeal of American slavery know nothing of the hardships through which their fathers came. Some reason for this may be found in the fact that those fathers hated to harrow the minds of their children by the recital of their cruel experiences of those dark days.... While it is sweet to forgive and forget, there are somethings that should never be forgotten. If this humble narrative will serve to cause the youth of my people to take a glance backward, the object of the writer will have been attained."

Williams' memoir, written in 1914, uses pseudonyms for the majority of individuals and places of which he speaks. For example, the Ward, Bale, and Dane families he discusses in his memoir are likely fake names, just as Williams himself used a pseudonym in order to author his work.

Williams' memoir was eventually published in 1929 by Gold Mind Publishing Company in Boston. Williams' grandson, William A. Cox Jr., was listed as a "typesetter" in the 1930 U.S. Census. Cox appears to have run or somehow been involved with a small press known as the Gold Mind Printers in Boston around the years of 1928 to 1930. It was likely the same printing company that published Williams' memoir, as Gold Mind Publishing Company was based in the same city and has a similar name. Thus, it is likely Williams received his grandson's help in publishing his memoir.

Williams continued to live with his family for several decades after publishing his memoir and died in Massachusetts in 1946.

== See also ==
- African American literature
- Slavery in the United States
- Slave narrative
- "Before the War and After the Union, an Autobiography". Aleckson, Sam B (2000)
