= Skippy Smith =

American stunt skydiver, entrepreneur (1913–2003)

- Born: Howard Smith; 1913; Birmingham, Alabama, U.S.
- Died: 2003 (aged 89–90)
- Other names: Howard "Skippy" Smith
- Occupations: Stunt skydiver, pilot, entrepreneur

Howard "Skippy" Smith (1913 – 2003) was an American stunt skydiver, pilot, and entrepreneur. During World War II he founded and managed the Pacific Parachute Company in San Diego, California, the first national Black–owned and managed defense production plant.

== Early life and family ==
Howard "Skippy" Smith was born in 1913, in Birmingham, Alabama. His father had been a professor at the Tuskegee Institute (now Tuskegee University) in Tuskegee, Alabama. Smith play professional baseball in Birmingham and New Orleans. During the Great Depression, Smith moved to Los Angeles with the hopes of becoming a pilot.

== Career ==
Smith became a known skydiver by 1939, working with his partner Mac "Skip" Gravelly. The two would do stunt jumps which were free falls followed by delayed parachute openings, and spot landings in which they would land in precisely in a predesignated location. Smith made some 150 jumps during his short career as a stunt skydiver. Gravelly was killed in 1939 during an air show, when he borrowed a parachute and it was missing a pilot chute. His death impacted Smith's life and career, as a result, Smith was hired by defense contractor Standard Parachute in San Diego to test, pack, and inspect parachutes around the beginning of World War II.

In March 1942, Smith was able to open the Pacific Parachute Company in San Diego, California, with financial backing from actor and comedian Eddie "Rochester" Anderson. During its first year in business the Pacific Parachute Company produced nearly 50,000 parachutes, working as a contractor for Standard Parachute. Smith's company hired a diverse workforce, and was one of the few integrated workforces in San Diego at that time period. They were awarded in 1943 the National Negro Business League's Spaulding Award. The Office of the Coordinator of Information–Foreign Information Service (COI–FIS) hired photographer Russell Lee to photo-document Smith and the Pacific Parachute Company. At the end of World War II, the Pacific Parachute Company closed.
