= Matthew M. Lewey =

American politician, militia officer, and judge

Mathew McFarlan Lewey M.M. Lewey
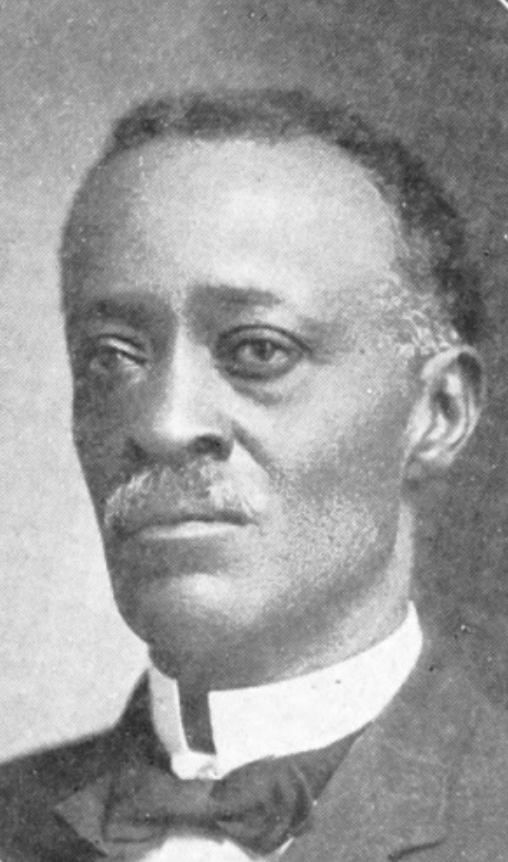

Member of the Florida House of Representatives from Alachua County, Florida
- In office 1883–1883

Personal details
- Born: December 1848 Baltimore, Maryland, U.S.
- Died: August 12, 1935 (aged 86) Jacksonville, Florida, U.S.
- Resting place: Mount Pleasant Cemetery, Gainesville, Alachua County, Florida, U.S.
- Education: Lincoln University, Howard University School of Law
- Occupation: Newspaper editor, newspaper publisher, military personnel, postmaster, lawyer, politician, justice of the peace

Military service
- Allegiance: United States of America
- Branch/service: Union Army
- Unit: 55th Massachusetts Infantry Regiment
- Battles/wars: American Civil War

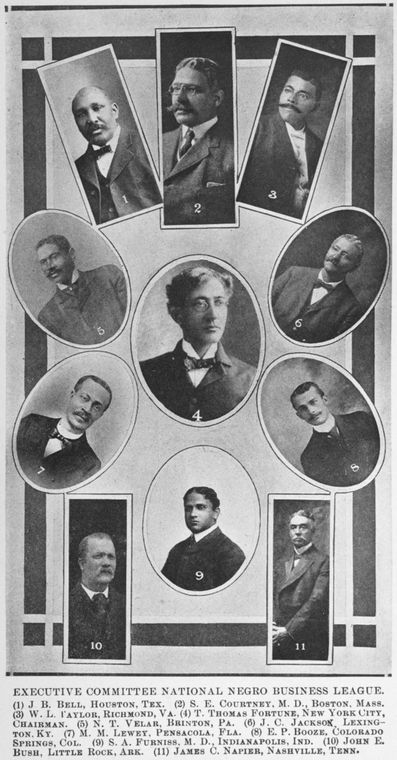
National Negro Business League portraits (1907), No. 7 is Lewey

Mathew McFarlan Lewey (December 1848 – August 12, 1935), was an American newspaper editor and publisher, postmaster, lawyer, politician, and justice of the peace in Florida. He also served as an officer in the Union Army, and as a militia officer. Lewey, who was from Baltimore, Maryland, was the first licensed Black male lawyer in Florida. He was a member of the National Negro Business League. Lewey served in the Florida House of Representatives and on Gainesville's city council. He also used the name M.M. Lewey.

== Early life and education ==
Lewey was born in Baltimore, Maryland in December 1848. His parents were Eliza (née McFarlin) and John W. Lewey. He had limited education up until age 15, and at age 16 he was sent to New York to live with his aunt Emeline Carter and his grandfather Rev. William McFarlin. After his move he attended the African Free School No. 2 (or Mulberry Street School) on Mulberry Street in New York City.

He left school early to join the Union Army. During the American Civil War he served in the 55th Massachusetts Infantry Regiment.

Lewey studied at Lincoln University in Pennsylvania; and at Howard University's Law School.

== Career ==
In 1876, he moved to Newnansville, Florida (near Gainesville). Lewey served as the postmaster and mayor (1875–1877) of Newnansville. During that same time from 1875 to 1876, Lewey was justice of the peace for Alachua County. He represented Alachua County in the Florida House of Representatives in 1883. He served as a Gainesville councilman from 1886 to 1890, and 1891.

In c. 1885, Lewey and Josiah T. Walls published The Farmers' Journal. In 1887, Lewey established the Gainesville Sentinel (one of Florida's first Black newspapers) which became the Florida Sentinel newspaper in Pensacola when he relocated there in 1894. He served as its editor and publisher.

In 1905, he started a Pensacola street car boycott to protest segregation. In 1919, Lewey was a founding member of the Associated Negro Press.

== Death and legacy ==
He died at age 88 on August 12, 1935, in Jacksonville, Florida. He is buried in Mount Pleasant Cemetery in Gainesville.

The New York Public Library has a photo of him. A profile of him is included in the books The Afro-American Press and Its Editors (1891).

== See also ==
- List of first African-American mayors
- African American officeholders from the end of the Civil War until before 1900
