= Texas Freeman =

African American newspaper

The Texas Freeman was a newspaper for African Americans established in 1893 in Houston, Texas. It was established by Charles N. Love along with his wife Lilla as well as Jack Tibbitto, and Emmett J. Scott who became its editor. It was the city's first African American newspaper. On January 3, 1931, the paper merged with the Houston Informer to become the Houston Informer and Texas Freeman.

The paper criticized Jim Crow laws, sought equal pay for African American teachers, advocated for Houston's Carnegie Library for African Americans, pushed for the hiring of African American postal workers, and opposed segregation. C.N. Love was a leading civil rights activist and advocate for the African American community. He was active in the Republican Party. During his career he was a member of the Republican Party's Black-and-tan faction, then the lily white faction, and sued to end the prohibition on African Americans voting in Democratic Party primaries as he sought for political representation and opportunities for African Americans.

In 1921, Love filed suit against Texas laws barring African Americans from voting. By the time it reached the Supreme Court it was determined to be moot and a political rather than a legal issue (Love v. Griffith).
