= Willard W. Allen =

Director of the NAACP

Willard W. Allen (May 3, 1888 – 1961) was a Director of the NAACP. He was born in Buckingham County, Virginia to George and Elizabeth Allen. Allen arrived in Baltimore, Maryland in 1904 where he worked as a porter in the private railroad car for George L. Potter, Vice-President of the Baltimore & Ohio Railroad; he eventually worked in Potter's residence in Towson, Maryland. He also earned money delivering newspapers for the Herald. Eventually Allen saved up enough money to enter into the insurance business, working for Mutual Benefit Company as a full-time agent. In 1922, he left Mutual to work for Southern Life Insurance Company and in 1925, he became the first president of the company. He served as president until his retirement in 1959.

In addition to his work for Southern, Allen worked in real estate as a broker and he became involved in civic interests. He was a 33rd degree Scottish Rite Mason and served as the Grand Master of the Most Worshipful Prince Hall Grand Lodge of Maryland.

Allen was married twice; first in 1914 to Thekla Henson, with whom he had two daughters: Madelyn and Elizabeth Allen. His second marriage was in 1926 to Gladys Rawlings.

Served on the Board of Trustees for Virginia Union University from 1950 until 1960. Served on the Board of Trustees for Morgan State College (now Morgan State University) for more than twenty years. Regional vice president of the National Negro Business League and a director of the NAACP.
