= Ralph Waldo Tyler =

American journalist

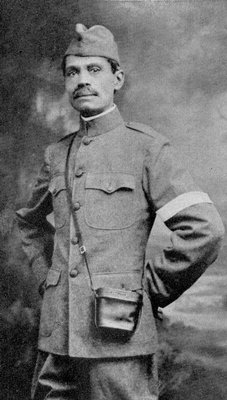
Ralph Waldo Tyler in uniform

Ralph Waldo Tyler (1860–1921) was an African-American journalist, war correspondent, and government official. He was the only accredited black foreign correspondent specifically reporting on African-American servicemen stationed in France during World War I. He was Auditor of the Department of the Navy from 1907 until 1913.

== Biography ==
Tyler's career began in his hometown of Columbus, Ohio, in the late 1880s, where he held several journalistic positions including editor of the Afro-American; co-founding the short-lived African-American newspaper, The Free American; contributing a Black news column and serving as society editor at the white-owned Columbus Evening Dispatch, and writing for The Ohio State Journal and The Cleveland Gazette among others. At the Columbus Evening Dispatch, Tyler also worked as the owner's private secretary.

Early on, his journalistic skills placed him in constant dialog with black political and business leaders in the Midwest who were engaged in improving the social standing of African Americans at the height of the Jim Crow laws. In 1906, Tyler actively campaigned for an appointment as United States consul to Brazil. His political activities drew the attention of prominent national Black figures.

In 1907, upon the advice of Booker T. Washington, Tyler was appointed by President Theodore Roosevelt to fill the post of Auditor of the Department of the Navy. He held this post until 1913, when during the first year of Woodrow Wilson's presidency—overlooking the advice of his colleagues—Tyler published an article in the Washington Evening Star criticizing the President's segregationist policies, such as the segregation of government offices. Soon afterward, Tyler's governmental post under Wilson ended.

Booker T. Washington and his Secretary, Emmett J. Scott, next recommended Tyler to be the National Organizer of the National Negro Business League (NNBL), an organization founded by Washington to engage in documenting the state of black businesses to promote an organized and active League membership. Tyler learned about the social conditions and concerns of blacks throughout the country. His role at the NNBL entailed visiting and addressing local branches of the NNBL. His findings were reported in a 1914 syndicated column of the American Press Association, and his travels through the Southern U.S. enabled him to undertake a personal study of the Great Migration then in progress by blacks out of the rural South for the North and Midwest. These reports were eventually published in various U.S. magazines, journals, and newspapers. In 1917, Tyler left this post to serve as secretary in another organization founded by Washington, the National Colored Soldiers' Comfort Committee, which provided financial support for black soldiers and their families.

Following this position, Tyler was selected as the only African-American journalist to be stationed overseas during World War I to report on black soldiers at the front. Although approximately 30,000 black combat troops and 160,000 Army laborers were stationed in the 92 and 93rd divisions in France, the mainstream press largely overlooked their contributions. Thus, in 1918 a committee of black journalists and civic leaders overseen by Emmett J. Scott, (a.k.a. Emmett Jay Scott) was formed to address the problem and Tyler was selected to report on the black troops serving in the War. At the time, Scott was employed by the U.S. as the Special Assistant for Race Relations to the Secretary of War, Newton Baker. Concurrently, there was also a growing concern among U.S. government officials that blacks, who were experiencing ongoing racism in the civilian population as well as overseas in France, would be swayed by German propaganda to turn against the U.S. war efforts. Scott was able to convince Baker to send Tyler to report on the developments of Black soldiers with the stipulation that Tyler's reports would be screened by Baker and the Committee on Public Information (CPI) then by Scott before they were circulated in the U.S. press. Tyler later said that he accepted the position without salary and he would only be paid his expenses so that he would be able to speak freely on what he witnessed once he returned home. He was stationed in the northeast Metz region of France with the all Black soldiered 92nd division of General John J. Pershing's brigade. Reporting from the trenches at the front in Northeastern Metz, France, Tyler's reports were screened by the U.S. Committee on Public Information, sent back to the U.S., and edited and distributed by Scott to newspapers and journals nationally. Later Scott published several of Tyler's reports in Scott's Official History of the American Negro in The World War (1919).

Back in the States, Tyler's reports provided first-hand accounts of the heroic deeds of black soldiers and boosted the morale of the troops overseas. He also documented discrimination that the black troops faced at the hands of white American organizations and service personnel, and contrasted it with the relatively unbiased treatment they received from the French. Following the war, Tyler returned to Ohio where he worked in journalism, becoming editor of the Cleveland Advocate in 1919, associate editor of the Columbus Ohio State Monitor, and contributing articles to newspapers in New York and Chicago. Numerous letters of Tyler's personal correspondence can be found at the Ohio Historical Society. The Schomburg Center for Research in Black Culture holds Tyler's business letters and reports from his post as National Director of the National Negro Business League.
