= C. N. Love =

Newspaper publisher

Charles Norton Love (died 1946) was a pioneering newspaper publisher and civil rights activist in Houston, Texas. Love became a leading civil rights activist and advocate for the African American community. The Love's paper, the Texas Freeman criticized Jim Crow laws, sought equal pay for African American teachers, advocated for Houston's Carnegie Library for African Americans, pushed for the hiring of African American postal workers, and opposed segregation. He was active in the Republican Party and was a member of the Black-and-tan faction, then the lily white faction, and eventually sued to end the prohibition on African Americans voting in primaries held by the Democratic Party (the dominant party in Texas at the time). He steadfastly sought out political representation and other opportunities for African Americans.

Love established the Navasota Echo in the countryside. After it closed, He launched the Texas Freeman newspaper in Houston in 1893 and published its first issue with his wife Lilla. The paper condemned discrimination, while advocating for equal pay, job opportunities, and against voting restrictions facing African Americans in Texas. He sued when Texas passed a law prohibiting African Americans from voting in 1923 after a series of local measures restricting their voting rights. African Americans were prohibited from membership in the Democratic Party in Texas.

Love was tall, slender, terribly near-sighted and albino. Love was attacked by arsonists at his home and shot in the streets. He survived to see the Democratic Party of Texas finally admit African Americans in the 1940s. He died in 1943 and is buried in Paradise Cemetery in Acres Homes.
