= Robert E. Clay =

American educator

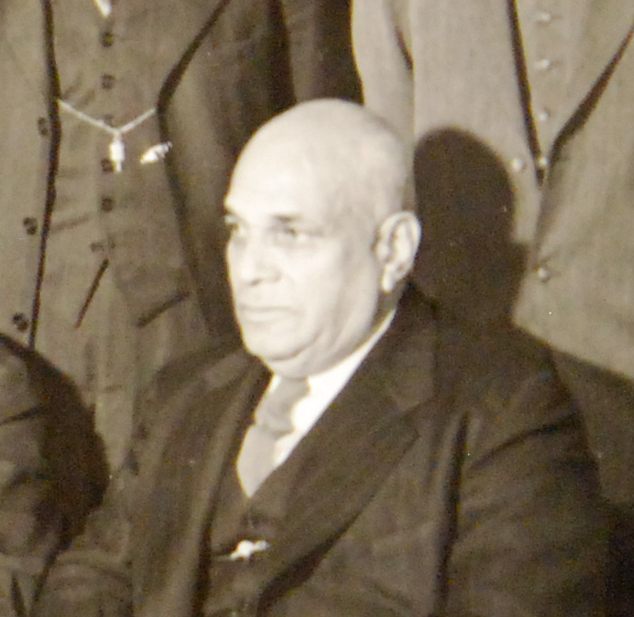
- Clay in 1942
- Born: June 25, 1875; Bristol, Virginia, U.S.
- Died: June 23, 1961 (aged 85); Nashville, Tennessee, U.S.
- Education: Tennessee State University
- Occupation: Educator
- Spouse: Obelia M. Goins
- Children: 1 son

Robert Edward Clay (June 25, 1875 – June 23, 1961) was an American educator. He was the state agent for Rosenwald schools in Tennessee and the director of the Sunday School at Tennessee State University. He is the namesake of the R. E. Clay Education Building on the TSU campus.

== Early life and education ==
Clay was born on June 25, 1875, in Bristol, Virginia. He received a bachelor of science degree from Tennessee A & I State College (later known as Tennessee State University) in 1932.

== Career ==
Clay began his career by working for Booker T. Washington, both at the National Negro Business League and at the Tuskegee Institute.

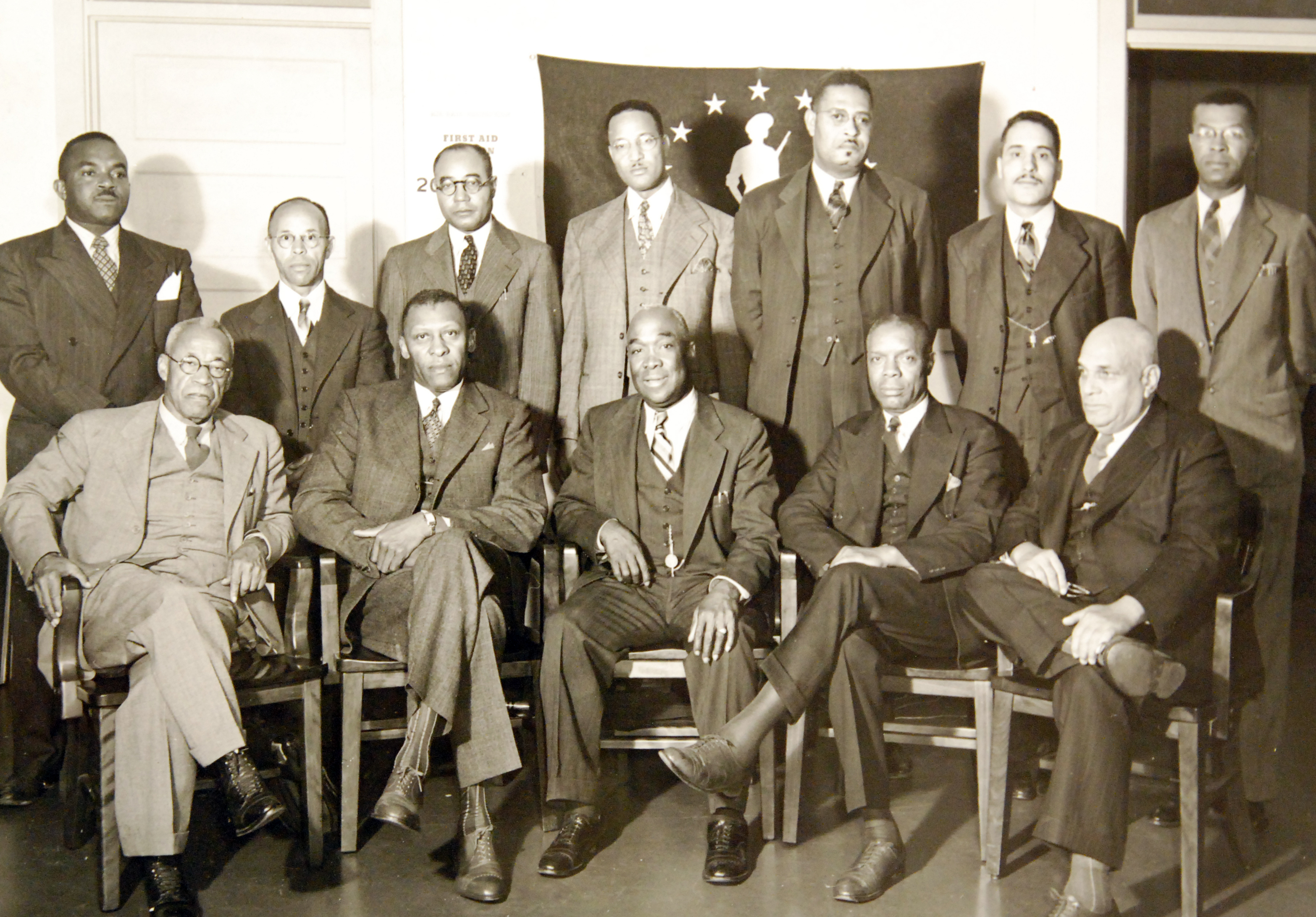
Among other prominent African Americans trained by the Treasury Department to sell war bonds

Clay was the state agent for Rosenwald schools in Tennessee from 1917 to 1937. During his tenure, he helped build 501 Rosenwald schools. From 1937 to 1955, he was the state developer of Negro education. Clay was also an advisor to Tennessee State University's presidents William J. Hale and Walter S. Davis, and he led its Sunday school.

Clay was a member of the Interracial League of Tennessee and the Commission of Race Relations, the National Youth Administration, and the State Better Homes Movement.

== Personal life, death and legacy ==
Clay married Obelia M. Goins; they had a son, Hairston Clay. Clay died on June 23, 1961, in Nashville, Tennessee, at 86. His funeral was held in TSU's auditorium. In 1968, the R. E. Clay Education Building on the TSU campus was named in his honor.
