= Technology For All =

Technology For All is a nonprofit organization based in Houston, Texas. Developed in 1997 by local entrepreneurs, Technology For All services community-based organizations (such as development centers, YMCAs, and local schools) with computer technology, training, and other digital incentives “to empower under-resourced communities through the tools of technology.” Through the National Telecommunications and Information Administration's Broadband Technology Opportunities Program grant, Technology For All (TFA) currently hosts 19 public computer centers.

== History ==
Technology For All was formed in 1997 as a response to a perceived lack of digital inclusion for historically low-income areas. In 1998, it received M.D Anderson Foundation's first $50,000 grant to help build a community technology center at the M.D. Anderson YMCA. According to their website, TFA has created 180 community technology centers in the United States since its inception, all partnered with community-serving organizations.

When the Reliant Astrodome sheltered Hurricane Katrina refugees in 2005, TFA coordinated a lab with 40 computers and other free supplies.

== Community development ==
Technology For All divides its goals into three priorities: community technology center support and development, technology research and innovation, and technology services.

=== TFA-Wireless ===
TFA and Rice University operate the TFA-Wireless project, which provides free high-speed wireless Internet to Pecan Park, Houston. In 2011, they installed the first residential deployment of Super Wi-Fi, which uses longer wavelengths to penetrate typical wireless barriers.

=== Texas Connects Coalition ===
Texas Connects Coalition (TXC2) is a partnership between TFA, Austin FreeNet (AFN), and the Metropolitan Austin Interactive Network (MAIN). It was recently awarded a Broadband Technology Opportunities Program (BTOP) grant valued at over nine million dollars. The grant is provided by the National Telecommunications and Information Administration and funded by the American Recovery and Reinvestment Act of 2009. The coalition is summarized as a “comprehensive … initiative significantly expanding broadband public computer center capacity ... across Texas.” With the grant, TXC2 plans to install and maintain 70 public computer centers throughout Austin, San Antonio, Houston, and the Brazos Valley to "provide computer access, technical support, digital literacy, workforce development and other services to low-income and vulnerable populations."

=== Public computer centers ===
Through the BTOP grant, TFA aims to extend its network of public computer centers to 19. Each lab is partnered with organizations in historically underprivileged neighborhoods, such as Eastside University Village Community Learning Center in Third Ward and the Spring Branch Family Development Center. Each center provides public computers, printers, and Internet access, plus a trainer to manage the center and teach various computer literacy courses.

According to their website, TFA operates open labs in these community spaces, located in the following super neighborhoods:

- Bethel's Place (Westbury, Houston/Brays Oaks)
- Denver Harbor Multi-Service Center (Denver Harbor)
- Eastside University Village Community Learning Center (Third Ward)
- Elevation Station (Spring Branch)
- Gulf Coast Arms (Trinity/Houston Gardens)
- Haverstock Apartments (Airport)
- Impact Youth Development Center (Trinity/Houston Gardens)
- Magnolia Multi-Service Center (Magnolia Park, Houston)
- M.D. Anderson YMCA (Northside Village/Kashmere Gardens)
- Mission Milby Community Development Center (Pecan Park)
- New Mt. Carmel Missionary Baptist Church (Trinity/Houston Gardens)
- The REACH Center (Westbury, Houston)
- SHAPE Community Center (Midtown, Houston)
- Settegast Heights Village (Settegast, Houston)
- Sharpstown Learning Center (Sharpstown, Houston)
- Sharpstown Apartments (Westwood)
- South Union Community Development Center (OST/South Union)
- Spring Branch Family Development Center (Spring Branch Central/Fairbanks, Houston)

TFA also has rural sites and sites in San Antonio which it manages under the name TFA-Rural Texas San Antonio (TFA-RTSA), listed on the TXC2 website url=http://txc2.org/?page_id=100 TXC2 is a coalition including TFA, TFA-RTSA and Austin FreeNet. The TFA-RTSA sites include:

- Albert Benavidez Learning Center (San Antonio)
- Bastrop Public Library
- Benavides Library
- Blanco Library
- Blinn A. W. Hodde Jr. Technical Education Center (Brenham)
- Bob and Jean Billa Community Initiatives Learning Center (San Antonio)
- Nancy Carol Roberts Memorial Library (Brenham)
- Brenham Workforce Office
- Bryan Public Library
- Bryan Workforce Center
- Spring Branch Library (Bulverde)
- Caldwell Workforce Center
- Centerville Workforce Center
- Columbia Heights Family Learning Center (San Antonio)
- Freer Library
- Johnson City Library
- Fayette County Library (La Grange)
- Dr. Eugene Clark Library (Lockhart)
- Lockhart Technology Center
- Madison County Library (Madisonville)
- Madisonville Workforce Center
- Margarita Huantes Family Learning Center (San Antonio)
- Navasota Library
- Navasota Workforce Center
- Larry J. Ringer Library (College Station)
- Robertson County Carnegie Library (Franklin)
- San Diego Library
- Smithville satellite office for Technology For all – Rural Texas and San Antonio
- Smithville Community Network (Smithville Recreation Center)
- Smith-Welch Library (Hearne)
- St. Mary’s Family Learning Center (San Antonio)
- Victor Farrari Family Learning Center (San Antonio)
- Ward Memorial Library (Centerville)

== See also ==
- E-inclusion
- Community technology center
- Computer literacy
- Web Accessibility
