= Houston Gardens, Houston =

Neighborhood in Houston, Texas

Coordinates: 29.824°N 95.302°W

Houston/Trinity Gardens is an African-American neighborhood in Houston.

== History ==
The Subsistence Homesteads Division of the Interior Department, a program of the New Deal, developed Houston Gardens to give the poor and landless people the opportunity the opportunity to become homeowners. Houston Gardens was the only such community developed in Greater Houston area. The City of Houston annexed it in the 1940s.

== Cityscape ==
Rafael Longoria and Susan Rogers of the Rice Design Alliance described the Houston Gardens as "rurban," a word coined in 1918 which describes an area with a mix of urban and rural characteristics. The layout of Houston Gardens consists of a large oval, parceled into pie-shaped plots of lands. Longoria and Rogers said that "this unique plan is easy to spot on a Houston map."

== Demographics ==
In 2015 the City of Houston Trinity/Houston Gardens Super Neighborhood had 15,798 residents. 77% were non-Hispanic black, 30% were Hispanic, 2% were non-Hispanic white, and 1% were non-Hispanic others. The percentage of non-Hispanic Asians was zero. In 2000, the super neighborhood had 18,054 residents. 81% were non-Hispanic black, 16% were Hispanic, 2% were non-Hispanic white, and 1% were non-Hispanic others. The percentage of non-Hispanic Asians was zero.

== Government and infrastructure ==
Houston Gardens is in Houston City Council District B.

The Harris Health System (formerly Harris County Hospital District) has designated Settegast Health Center for ZIP code 77028. The nearest public hospital is Lyndon B. Johnson Hospital in northeast Houston.

== Education ==
Houston Gardens is served by Houston Independent School District.

Residents are zoned to Ernest McGowen Sr. Elementary School (previously Houston Gardens Elementary School), Key Middle School, and Kashmere High School.

== Parks and recreation ==
The City of Houston operates the Houston Gardens Park.
