= Key Middle School =

Key Middle School or Francis Scott Key Middle School can refer to several schools in the US:

- Francis Scott Key Middle School (Silver Spring, Maryland), see Silver Spring, Maryland#Middle schools
- Francis Scott Key Middle School (Springfield), in Fairfax County, Virginia
- Key Middle School (Texas) in Houston, Texas
- The Key School, in Hillsmere Shores, Maryland, near Annapolis
