= Kashmere Gardens, Houston =

Neighborhood of Houston, Texas

Kashmere Gardens is a historically African-American neighborhood in the northern 610 Loop area in Houston, Texas, United States. A group of single-family houses, many of which have large lots, Kashmere Gardens is between an industrial area and a rail corridor.

As of 2015, the Kashmere Gardens Super Neighborhood number 52 had about 10,005 people.

== History ==
The City of Houston annexed it in the 1940s.

Between 1990 and 2000, the Hispanic population of Kashmere Gardens increased from around 19% of the population to around 31%, as Hispanics in the Houston area moved into majority-black neighborhoods. In the same period, the black population of the Kashmere area declined by 1,711, as majority African-American neighborhoods in Houston had declines in their black populations.

A study by the Evert Crawford of Crawford Realty Advisors, in conjunction with the Institute for Regional Forecasting, stated that Kashmere Gardens' population increased by 10.5% each year from 2000 to 2005.

In 2007, Kashmere Gardens was one of several Houston neighborhoods with a high concentration of felons.

By 2010, the Harris County Flood Control District began buying houses in the district to reduce the effects of potential floods.

The community received severe damage from Hurricane Harvey in 2017. The president of the Kashmere Gardens Super Neighborhood Association, Keith Downey, stated that residents felt helpless in the face of institutional failures in local governments. Danny Vinik of Politico wrote, "Nearly every street [in Kashmere Gardens] has gutted homes."

In 2019, the Texas Department of State Health Services published a report indicating the neighborhood had higher-than-average cancer rates.

== Demographics ==
In 2000, the Kashmere Gardens Super Neighborhood had about 11,286 people, with 2,800 people per square mile. As of 2015, the neighborhood had about 10,005 people, with 2,493 people per square mile. As of 2018 the median income was $23,000.

== Government and infrastructure ==
Kashmere Gardens is in Houston City Council District B.

The Houston Fire Department operates Fire Station 39 at 5810 Pickfair Street. It is within Fire District 34.

Harris Health System (formerly Harris County Hospital District) designated Settegast Health Center for ZIP code 77026. The nearest public hospital is Lyndon B. Johnson Hospital in northeast Houston.

== Education ==
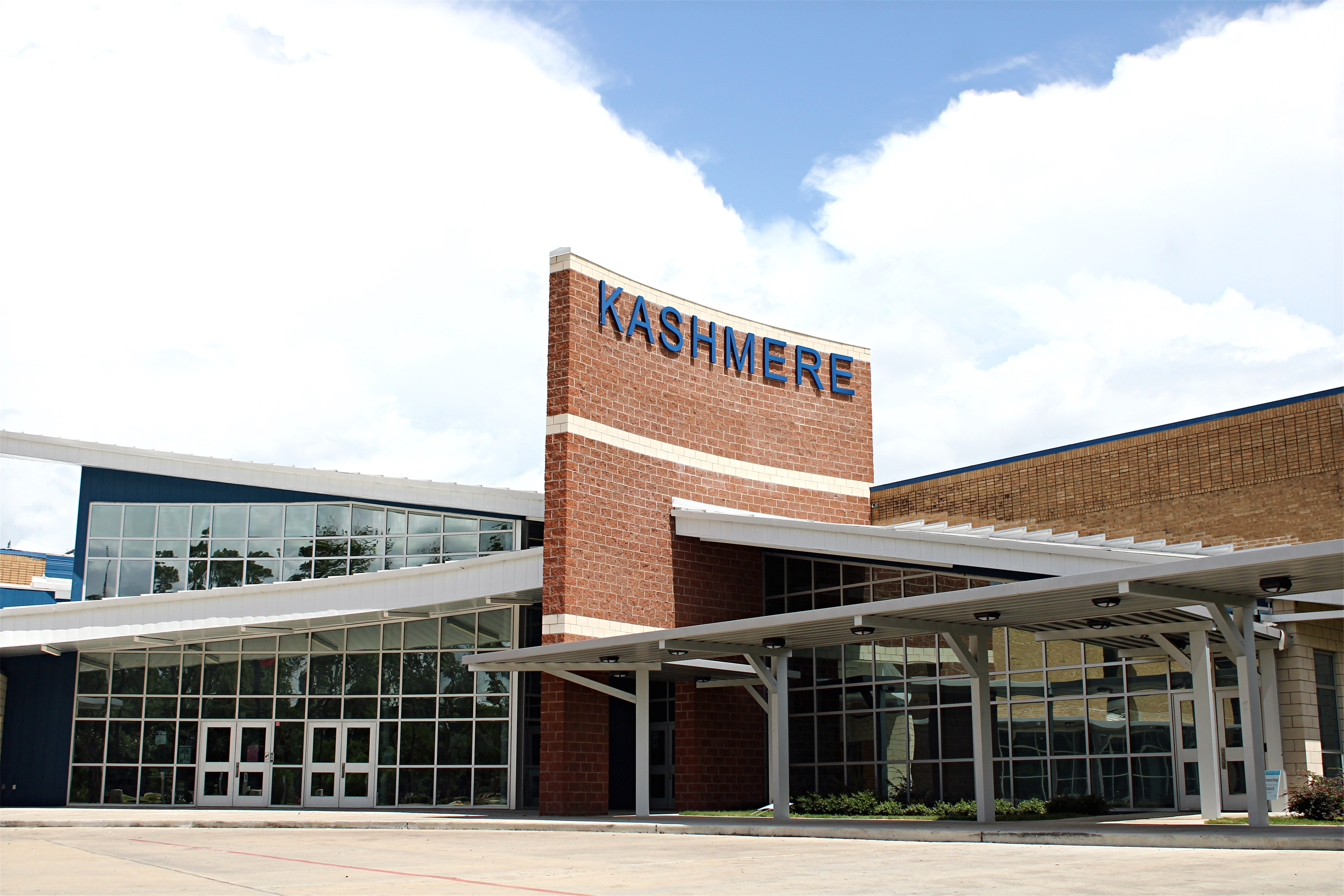
Kashmere High School

The Houston Independent School District operates local public schools. Kashmere Gardens is within Trustee District II, represented by Carol Mims Galloway as of 2009.

Residents are zoned to:

- Kashmere Gardens Elementary School (most), and Isaacs Elementary School (some)
- Key Middle School (most), and Fleming Middle School (some)
- Kashmere High School (most), and Wheatley High School (some)

In 2008, criminals systematically burglarized several area schools.

The Roman Catholic Archdiocese of Galveston-Houston operated St.Francis of Assisi Catholic School in Kashmere Gardens. It was established in 1955, and closed in 2020. Parent Sharita Palmer Mayo, as paraphrased by Giulia McDonnell Nieto del Rio of The New York Times, stated that the school "had been severely damaged by Hurricane Harvey in 2017, but community members had worked hard to support rebuilding efforts and [reopen]"; the archdiocese attributed the closure to COVID-19.

Houston Public Library operated the McCrane-Kashmere Gardens Neighborhood Library at 5411 Pardee Street. The library closed after Hurricane Harvey damaged it in 2017. In 2018, city library officials were reportedly unsure whether they would reopen the library. By 2020, plans were underway to renovate the facility, though the COVID-19 pandemic had slowed this process.

== Notable residents ==
- Harold Dutton – member of the Texas House of Representatives
- Johnny Bush – country music singer

== See also ==
- Geographic areas of Houston
