= BJCC =

BJCC may refer to:

- Barbara Jordan Career Center, in Houston, Texas, US
- Bathurst Jewish Community Centre, now Prosserman Jewish Community Centre, in Toronto, Canada
- Birmingham–Jefferson Convention Complex, in Birmingham, Alabama, US
