= Kashmere High School =

High school in Houston, Texas, United States

Coordinates: 29.8226°N 95.3153°W

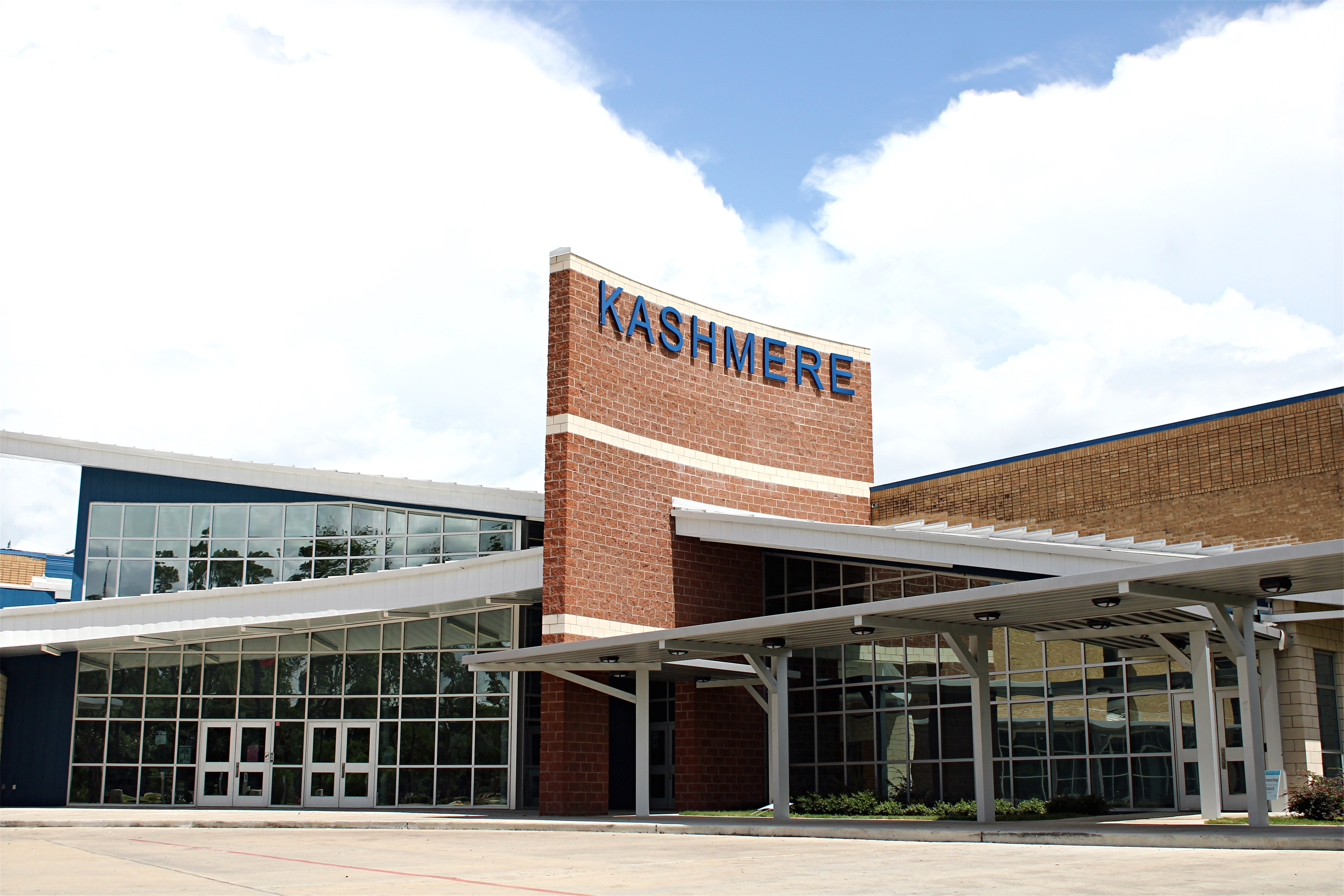

Location
- 6900 Wileyvale Street; Houston, (Harris County), Texas 77028; United States

Information
- Type: Public high school
- Principal: Brandon Dickerson
- Staff: 65.75 (FTE)
- Enrollment: 640 (2023-2024)
- Student to teacher ratio: 9.73
- Colors: Red, blue and white
- Nickname: Fighting Rams
- Website: kashmere.houstonisd.org

Kashmere High School is a secondary school in Houston, Texas that serves grades 9 through 12; it is a part of the Houston Independent School District (HISD). It is located in the Trinity Gardens neighborhood, and its namesake is the nearby Kashmere Gardens neighborhood.

Kashmere contains the Conrad O. Johnson School of Fine Arts, an HISD magnet-school program.

== History ==
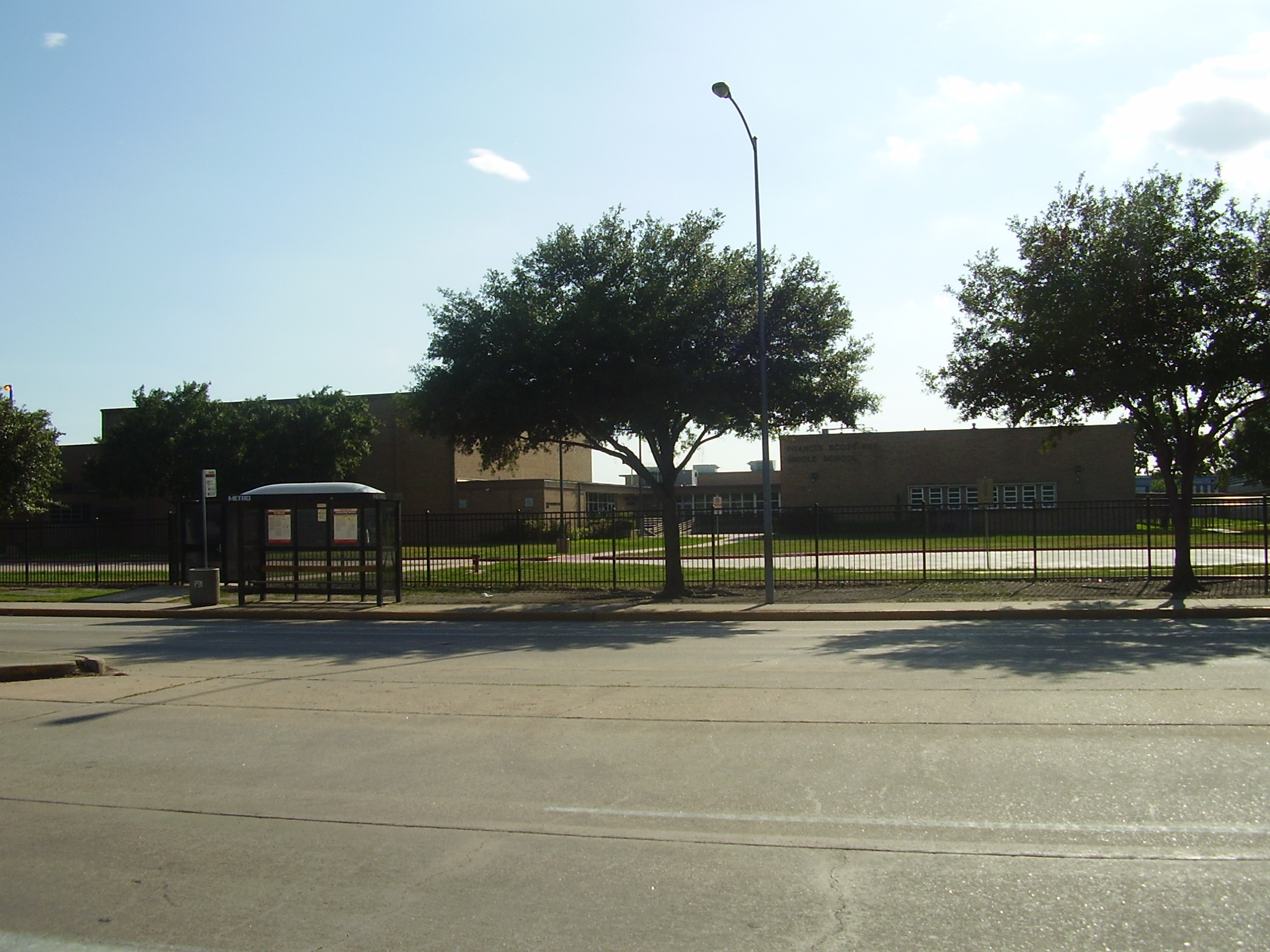
Key Middle School was the original campus for Kashmere.

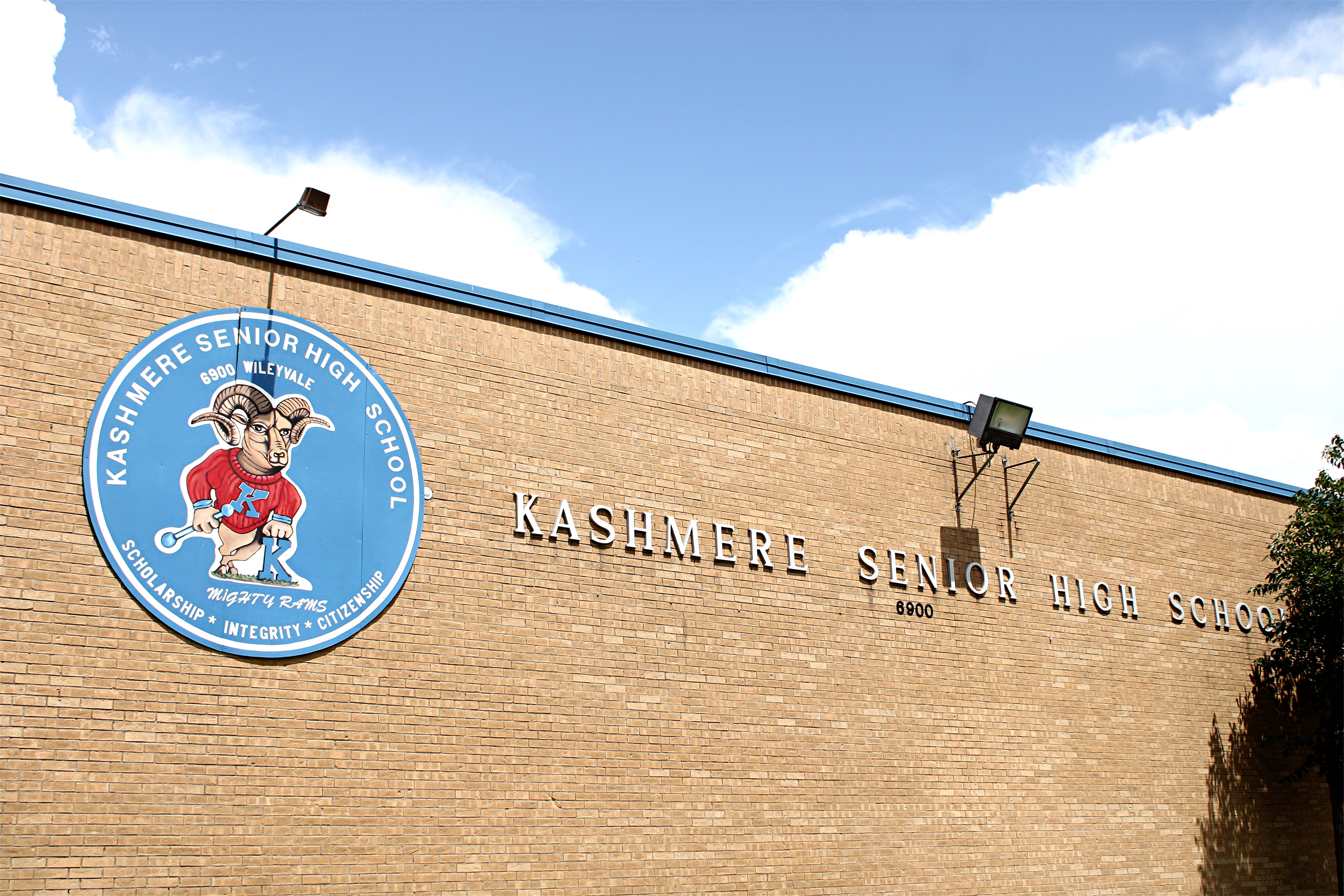
Previous Kashmere building

Kashmere High School opened in 1957 at Hirsch Road at Kelly Street. In 1968, Kashmere moved to a new campus at 6900 Wileyvale Road, and the Hirsch Kelley campus became Key Middle School.

In 2013, the North Forest Independent School District was annexed into HISD. Portions, including Settegast, were rezoned from North Forest High School (the only remaining comprehensive high school in NFISD) to Kashmere.

By 2016, Kashmere underwent remodeling. The total cost was $19,000,000, and the remodeled campus opened in 2018.

The school got failing grades in state accountability measures in the period 2013–2016, so the Texas Education Agency appointed Doris Delaney as the conservator of Kashmere High. In 2019, the school got a passing score, but got failing scores in 2022.

== Administration ==
From about 2008 until 2016, the school had four principals and one interim principal.

HISD superintendent Abelardo Saavedra attempted to demote one principal, but the board of education reversed his decision. Saavedra's successor, Terry Grier, fired that principal.

In 2010, HISD accused principal Mable Caleb of stealing school property and facilitating academic dishonesty, and the board voted to fire her, but an administrative law judge ruled in 2014 that Caleb was not guilty of the charges. Caleb sued HISD, and in 2016, the two parties agreed to a settlement in which she received $550,000.

By 2016, Nancy Blackwell was the principal. She had previous experience with low-income teaching environments in the Aldine Independent School District. The principal prior to Blackwell was relatively new to being a principal, as was Blackwell herself, although Blackwell had previous experience as an administrator. Circa 2018 Reginald "Reggie" Bush began his principalship.

== Curriculum ==
As of 2016- students may take courses with Houston Community College as part of a partnership.

== Academic performance ==
Beginning in 2002 and continuing as of 2016, Kashmere had repeated issues with academic performance. From the period 2005 to 2015, members of the surrounding community protested reoccurring plans to close Kashmere stemming from its low performance. In 2016, HISD academic officer Grenita Lathan stated that issues at the elementary school and middle schools which feed into Kashmere contribute to the academic issues at the high school. Margaret Downing of the Houston Press wrote that the school has had a "lasting stigma" due to its poor academic performance.

Kashmere, with Jack Yates High School and Sam Houston High School, were the three high schools in Houston ISD which were consistently low-performing in test scores from 2001 to 2004. Because of this problem, movements began to have the state or another organization take over the schools for a period, so the test scores would rise to acceptable levels. While Yates got an acceptable rating in 2005, Sam Houston and Kashmere continued to get unacceptable ratings. In August 2006, the school learned that it again was getting an unacceptable rating from the Texas Education Agency (TEA). When the HISD administration threatened closure if another "unacceptable" rating came the following year, the local community protested. In summer 2007, Abelardo Saavedra, the superintendent of HISD, formally requested that all of the schools under consideration for closing due to academic performance should stay open. Kashmere received an acceptable rating in 2007 because the TEA has a provision allowing for a school to receive an acceptable rating even if the school fails in some of its criteria as long as the failures are within five points of the passing rate. In 2008, it also received a scores other than the lowest possible rating from the TEA, but in every other school year from mid-2002 to mid-2016, it always received the lowest ratings.

In 2007, a Johns Hopkins University/Associated Press study referred to Kashmere as a "dropout factory", meaning that at least 40% of an entering freshmen do not make it to their senior year. During that year, 58% of children zoned to Kashmere chose to attend a different HISD school. As of 2015, many students zoned to Kashmere transferred to Barbara Jordan High School.

In the 2014-2015 school year, 47% of students passed state examinations. In September of that year, the State of Texas appointed Kashmere alumna Doris Delaney as the conservator of the school. Delaney had a working relationship with Blackwell.

To address the issues, the school began to more heavily emphasize career and university preparation, increased observation of teaching, and hired additional counselors. In 2016, HISD board member Rhonda Skillern-Jones stated that Kashmere had made more improvement during two years of Blackwell's leadership than during the preceding eight years under other principals. In addition, an agency was brought in to resolve issues stemming from the students' home lives. By December 2016, a nonprofit organization called ProUnitas, established by former Kashmere teacher Adeeb Barqawi, began acting as a case manager and identifying especially needy students at Kashmere so the school administration can better serve them and allow them to prosper in an academic environment. By offering the services on-campus, students are more likely to accept them and participate.

In 2019, the TEA ranked the school "C". Margaret Downing of the Houston Press wrote, "Because when you're looking at another "F", clearing the hurdles with a "C" is next to a miracle."

== Transportation ==
As of 2016, most students walk to school, and other than school buses have few means of traveling to other schools.

== Athletics and extracurricular activities ==
Wheatley High School is Kashmere's rival. Kashmere students believed that any fellow students who transferred to Wheatley were traitorous towards Kashmere.

As of 2016, Kashmere's JROTC had over 235 students.

=== Music ===
Kashmere High School was home of the Kashmere Stage Band, a nationally renowned band that released several jazz/funk albums in the 1960s and 1970s.

The school is also known for the vocal ensemble under the direction of Joan E. Hubert, a member of Houston Ebony Opera Guild. These students' talents took them to Africa in 1997. In 2003, they performed for Senator Rodney Ellis and were the featured choir in Martin Luther King Memorial Concert along with the Scott Joplin Orchestra of Texas Southern University.

Kashmere had Jay-Z as "principal for a day" in 2002.

Around 2016, the band had 41 members. In a period of one year, it increased to that number from seven and it began doing more significant activities, such as marching in parades. Margaret Downing of the Houston Press wrote that it was "not quite at the level of the historic Thunder Soul corps".

== Student body ==
Kashmere, during the 2014-2015 school year, had a total of 585 students, giving it the lowest enrollment of any HISD comprehensive high school. Of the students, 72% were African American and 27% were Hispanic American. About 20% were eligible to take special education classes. The majority of the students were classified as low income. By 2016, it had 608 students, with 14% being Hispanic or Latino and a total of five students being white. The campus was under-used due to the low population; Blackwell stated that when she first arrived to the campus, she believed "it looked like it had been abandoned".

In the 1970s, the student population was about 1,500, and in the 1980s, it was about 1,800.

As of 2016, the student body was so poor that the school offered free early dinner service, in addition to free breakfast and lunch. Some of the female students were mothers, having experienced teenaged pregnancy.

== Neighborhoods served by Kashmere ==
Kashmere serves the Houston Gardens, Kashmere Gardens, Settegast, and Trinity Gardens areas.

== School uniforms ==
Students may wear blue, red, white, or grey collared shirts along with jeans.

The TEA specified that the parents and/or guardians of students zoned to a school with uniforms may apply for a waiver to opt out of the uniform policy so their children do not have to wear the uniform; parents must specify bona fide reasons, such as religious reasons or philosophical objections.

== Feeder patterns ==
Elementary schools that feed into Kashmere:

- Cook
- Kashmere Gardens
- McGowen (formerly Houston Gardens)
- Paige (formerly Bowie)

(partial)

- Berry
- Elmore
- Hilliard
- Isaacs
- Ross

Two middle schools, Key Middle School and Henry Middle School, have some of their students move on to Kashmere.

== Notable alumni ==
- Antonio Armstrong - former NFL linebacker for the San Francisco 49ers, Miami Dolphins, and St. Louis Rams
- Harvey Armstrong - former NFL defensive tackle for the Philadelphia Eagles and Indianapolis Colts
- Bert Askson - former NFL tight end and defensive end
- Kirbyjon H. Caldwell - pastor of Windsor Village United Methodist Church
- Eddie Foster - former NFL wide receiver for the Houston Oilers
- Tim Gray - former NFL safety
- Jacob Green - former NFL defensive end for the Seattle Seahawks and San Francisco 49ers
- Rodney Hampton - former NFL running back for the New York Giants
- Mark Lewis - former NFL tight end for the Green Bay Packers and Detroit Lions
- Vernon Lewis - former NFL defensive back for the New England Patriots
- James Prince - music executive, founder of Rap-A-Lot Records
- Delvin Williams - former NFL running back for the San Francisco 49ers, Miami Dolphins, and Green Bay Packers
