= Antonio Armstrong =

American gridiron football player (1973–2016)

No. 58, 50
- Position: Linebacker

Personal information
- Born: October 15, 1973; Houston, Texas, U.S.
- Died: July 29, 2016 (aged 42); Houston, Texas, U.S.
- Listed height: 6 ft 1 in (1.85 m)
- Listed weight: 235 lb (107 kg)

Career information
- High school: Houston (TX) Kashmere
- College: Texas A&M
- NFL draft: 1995: 6th round, 201st overall pick

Career history
- San Francisco 49ers (1995)*; Miami Dolphins (1995); St. Louis Rams (1996)*; BC Lions (1998–1999); Winnipeg Blue Bombers (2000–2001)
- * Offseason or practice squad member only

Awards and highlights
- Winnipeg Blue Bombers Defensive PoY (2000); CFL East All-Star (2000); First-team All-American (1994); 2× First-team All-SWC (1993, 1994)
- Stats at Pro Football Reference

Antonio Donnell Armstrong (born Antonio Donnell Shorter; October 15, 1973 – July 29, 2016) was an American professional football linebacker who played in the National Football League (NFL) and Canadian Football League (CFL).

== Early life and college ==
Armstrong started at Kashmere High School and signed with nearby Texas A&M. As a junior at A&M, Armstrong earned Defensive Player of the Game honors after making eight tackles and three sacks in the 1994 Cotton Bowl Classic against Notre Dame. Armstrong earned AP All-America honors his senior year (1994) after making 62 tackles, including 17 behind the line of scrimmage as a senior. He was a semifinalist for the Butkus Award that year, and was a two-time All-SWC selection.

== Professional career ==
Pre-draft measurables
Height	Weight	Arm length	Hand span	Bench press
6 ft 1 3/4 in (1.87 m)	234 lb (106 kg)	30 1/2 in (0.77 m)	9 5/8 in (0.24 m)	17 reps

=== National Football League ===
Armstrong was selected in the sixth round of the 1995 NFL draft by the San Francisco 49ers, but fractured his ankle on the third day of training camp and was signed to the practice squad. He was released from the practice squad on October 15, 1995. On October 16, he was signed to the Miami Dolphins' practice squad and placed on the active roster a week later. Armstrong appeared in four games that season for the Dolphins and recorded four solo tackles. He was signed by the St. Louis Rams the following year, but was released after training camp.

=== Canadian Football League ===
Armstrong signed with the British Columbia Lions of the Canadian Football League in 1998 and made an immediate impact as a starter for two seasons with the team. In 2000, Armstrong was traded to the Winnipeg Blue Bombers. He was Winnipeg's defensive player of the year and an East Division All-star in 2000. On October 15, 2000, Armstrong suffered a fracture of his left ankle. The injury essentially ended his career, although he re-signed with the Bombers in September 2001 and started in the 2001 Grey Cup game. In 2002, Armstrong retired due to both a contract dispute and the physical limitations caused by his ankle injury two years before.

== Death ==
Armstrong was shot along with his wife, Dawn Armstrong in Houston, Texas, on July 29, 2016. Dawn was pronounced dead at the scene in her bedroom. Antonio was transported to Memorial Hermann in critical condition and later died at age 42. Their 16-year-old son AJ (Antonio Armstrong Jr.) was charged with murder.

The first two murder trials ended in mistrials. In 2019, the first jury deadlocked after failing to reach a unanimous verdict, with eight jurors voting guilty, and four voting not guilty. In the 2022 retrial, a second set of jurors was also unable to reach a verdict, with four convinced of AJ Armstrong's guilt, and the other eight, while not believing he was innocent, convinced that the defense had introduced reasonable doubt.

In 2023, a third trial focused on the alarm system, which showed no activity or signs of an intruder on the first floor of the residence, as well as newly discovered DNA evidence revealing the presence of Armstrong Sr.'s blood on his son's shirt. On August 16, 2023, AJ Armstrong was found guilty of murdering both his parents and was immediately sentenced to life in prison, with the possibility of parole after 40 years. Because he was a minor at the time he committed the murders, the death penalty and life without parole were not an option. Jurors told prosecutors that they had been convinced of AJ Armstrong's guilt due to his 911 call, his interview with investigators, and the fact that he had set a fire in the house and test-fired the murder weapon in the days before he had killed his parents.
