= Geographic areas of Houston =

Overview article

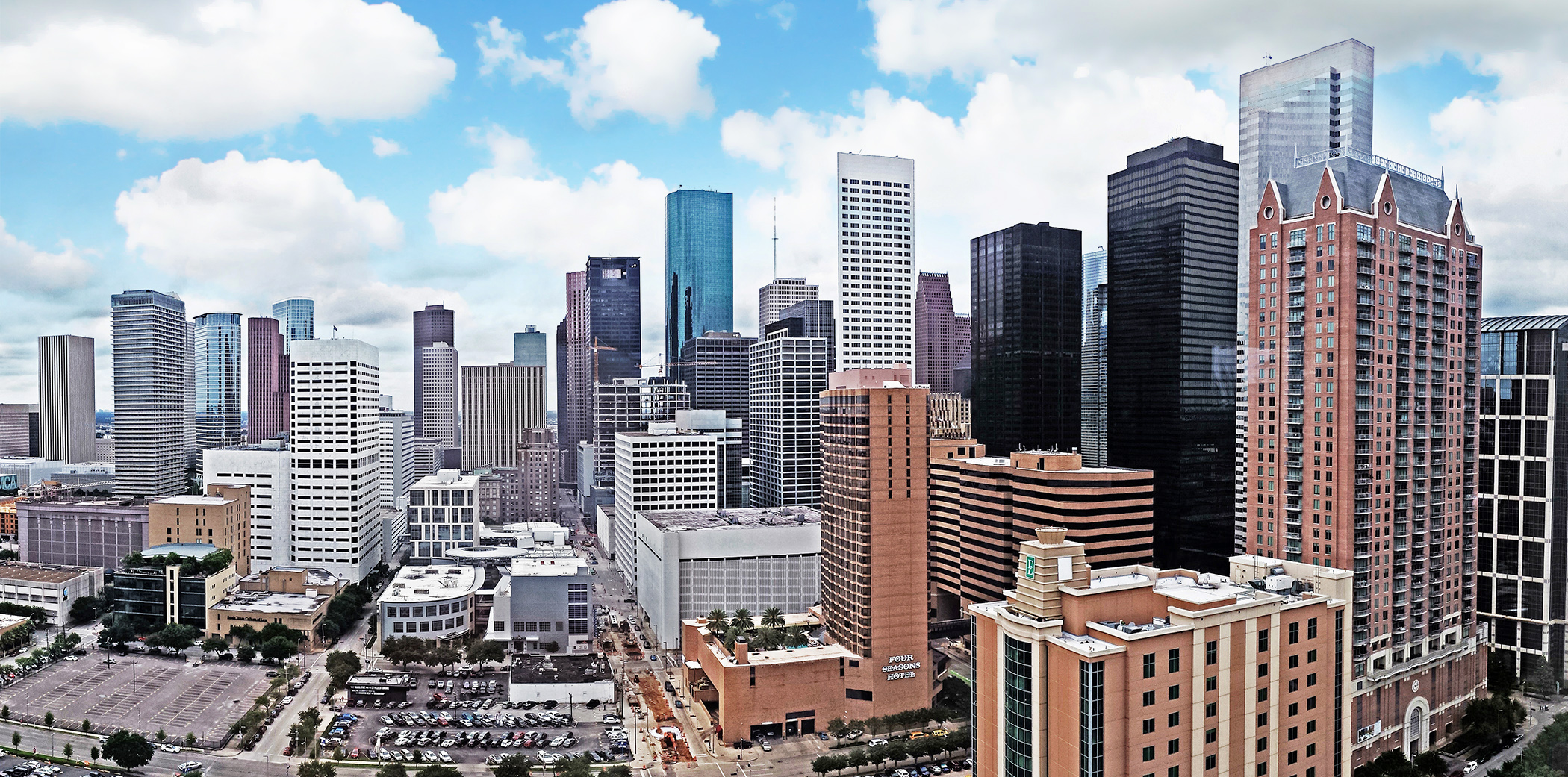
Downtown Houston

The geographic areas of Houston are generally classified as either being inside or outside Interstate 610, colloquially called "the Loop". The Loop generally encircles the central business district and the "island cities" of West University Place (West U.), Southside Place, and a portion of Bellaire. ("Island cities" refers to the city of Houston's practice of annexing around the existing boundaries of incorporated municipalities.)

Other "island cities" include the Memorial Villages – Bunker Hill Village, Hedwig Village, Hilshire Village, Hunters Creek Village, Piney Point Village, and Spring Valley Village.

The outlying areas of Houston, as well as the rest of Bellaire, the Memorial Villages, the airports, and the city's suburbs and enclaves are outside the loop. Another ring road, Beltway 8 (also known simply as "the Beltway"), encircles the city 5 mi (8.0 km) further out. A third road, State Highway 99 or Grand Parkway, has begun construction roughly 10 mi (16 km) beyond the Beltway, around the outer suburbs and currently extends from north of Interstate 10/U.S. Highway 90 east of Katy to Interstate 69/U.S. Highway 59 in Sugar Land.

Locations within the Houston city limits inside Beltway 8 had traditionally used the 713 area code. Those outside Beltway 8 but within city limits had received the 281 or 832 area code. The geographic division between 713, 281, and 832 has been eliminated, and newly issued phone numbers (especially for cell phones and fax machines) within that zone may be assigned any of the three codes. There is also a new, 346 area code. Areas far north, west, east and south of the inner-city also use 936 and 409. Zip codes in Houston range from 77002 to 77099. A small portion of northeast Houston uses zip codes 77339 and 77345.

Houston is the most populated city in the United States without zoning laws. City voters rejected creation of separate commercial and residential land-use districts in 1948, 1962 and 1993. As a result, Houston has grown in an unusual manner. Rather than a single “downtown” as the center of the city's employment, five additional business districts have grown throughout the inner city, including one for Houston's medical center complex. If these business districts were combined, they would form the third largest downtown in the United States. The city also has one of the largest skylines in the United States, but because it is spread a few miles apart, pictures of the city show, for the most part, the main downtown area.

== Development of geographic areas ==
John Nova Lomax of the Houston Press said that before the interstate system was established in Houston, the neighborhoods were "strongly distinct neighborhoods and districts with poetic names[...]".

Beginning in the 1960s the development of the 610 Loop caused the focus of the Houston area to move away from Downtown Houston. Joel Barna of Cite 42 said that this caused Greater Houston to shift from "a fragmenting but still centrally focused spatial entity into something more like a doughnut," and that Downtown Houston began to become a "hole" in the "doughnut." As interchange connections with the 610 Loop opened, according to Barna Downtown "became just another node in a multi-node grid" and, as of 1998, "has been that, with already established high densities and land prices." By 1998 Beltway 8 neared completion and development increased in the central city. Barna said that "it's as if Houston had stretched out so far that it its sprawl began doubling back upon itself."

Lisa Gray of the Houston Chronicle said that Houston differs from many "old-style" European cities and cities of the East Coast of the United States because Houston began with sprawl development and later developed dense cores, as opposed to beginning with dense cores and later developing sprawl. Many denser areas of Houston have parking garages, allowing automobile drivers to access areas with relatively few parking spaces.

== Downtown Houston ==
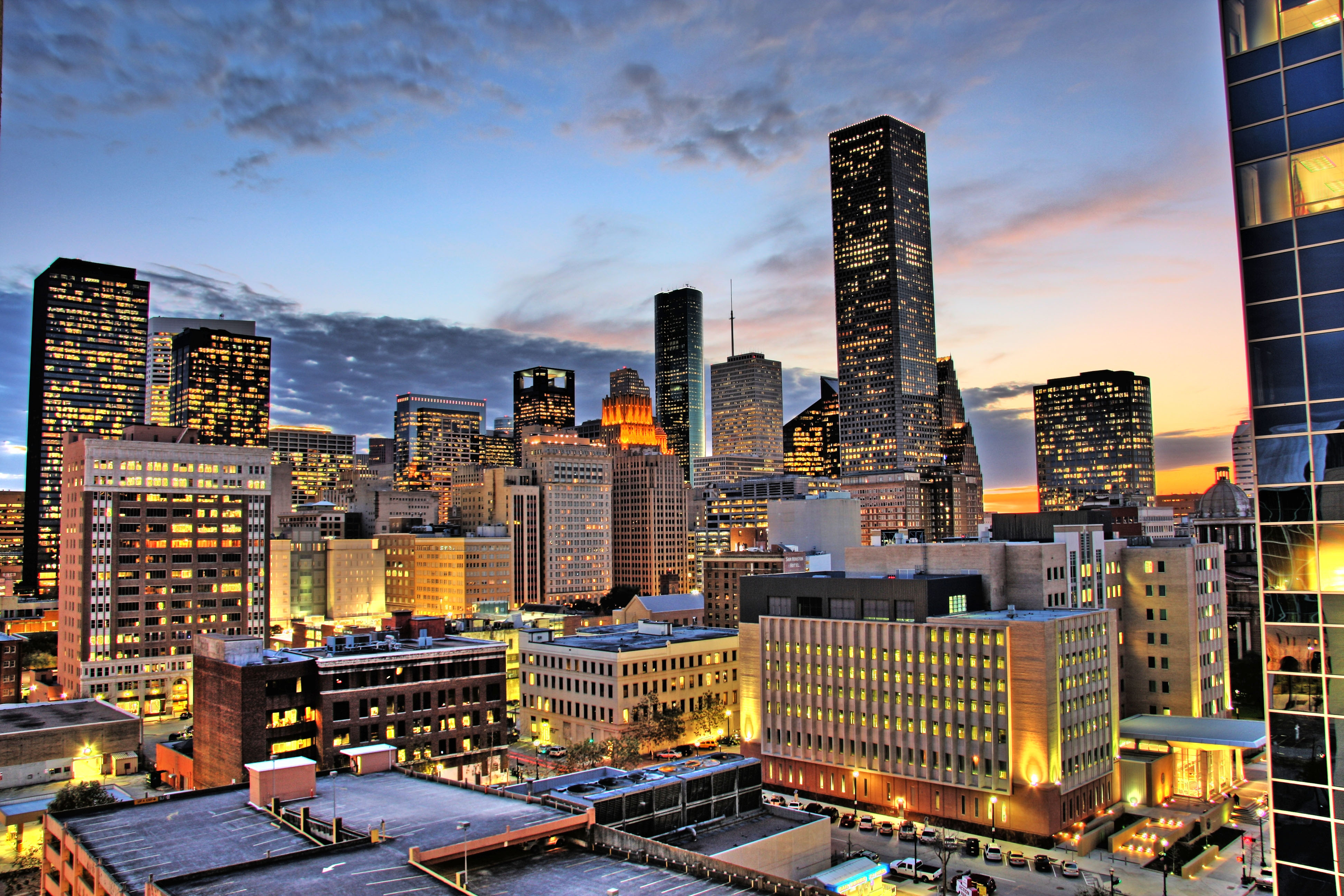
Downtown Houston at night

Downtown is located in the very center of the city's highway system, bounded by I-45 on the south and west, I-69/US-59 on the east, and Buffalo Bayou on the north.

The Skyline District is the heart of downtown and home to headquarters of various multinational businesses and financial institutions.

The Houston Theater District, in north downtown, is home to Houston's eight performing arts organizations and includes the Alley Theatre, Hobby Center for the Performing Arts, Wortham Center, the Revention Music Center, and Jones Hall, home of the Houston Symphony Orchestra. The theater district is the second-largest performing arts district, next to New York City.

Downtown is also home to one of the city's two Chinatowns. The first Chinatown is situated in the shadow of the George R. Brown Convention Center downtown, while the newer, larger Chinatown (originating around 1982), is located primarily on Bellaire Boulevard west of the Sharpstown neighborhood.

The Main Street Corridor in downtown, opened in 2004, has become a popular nightlife spot, particularly now that the city has light rail service. This is because the light rail line begins at the University of Houston–Downtown.

Preston Station is a neighborhood in downtown Houston that takes its name from the Houston MetroRail's Preston Station, which is at the neighborhood's center. It is well known for its bars and restaurants, and includes such famous buildings as the Rice Hotel, the St. Germain building, and the Hotel Icon.

== South Side ==
South of downtown, but to the east of Meyerland and Fondren, lies Hiram Clarke, Sunnyside, South Park, Kennedy Heights, and other largely African-American communities with sizable Latino populations. Collectively (with the Third Ward) known as the "Southside", these formerly rural communities were childhood homes of country singer Kenny Rogers and (more recently) rap artist Scarface.

Hiram Clarke is a small neighborhood in south side Houston. The neighborhood is adjacent to Hiram Clarke Blvd. and West Fuqua Street. It was named after a former president of Houston Lighting & Power, a predecessor to Reliant Energy.

== Southwest ==
The term "southwest Houston" often refers to the area that opened in the years following World War II, when they were considered to be suburbs, such as Alief, Fondren Southwest, Meyerland, Sharpstown and Westbury. Alief is a large, ethnically diverse community which Houston began annexing in 1977. Fondren Southwest and Meyerland are centers of Houston's Jewish community. Sharpstown has large Hispanic and Asian American communities and was the first master-planned community in Houston. Also in the southwest is the Pakistani & Indian enclave, now known as the Mahatma Gandhi District, informally known as Hilcroft. Westbury and Meyerland are becoming popular places for some gay men and lesbians to live, as real estate in the Neartown area has become more expensive as it has gentrified.

== Southeast ==
See Southeast Houston

== Northside ==
The Northside of Houston consists of several Historic neighborhoods to include Houston Heights, Near Northside, The Fifth Ward, The Historic Sixth Ward, Kashmere Gardens, Trinity Gardens, Homestead, Acres Homes, Greater inwood, the East Aldine District and Greenspoint. Residents of these neighborhoods commonly refer to this area as " Northside " Many suburban Houstonians confuse the term to be also associated with the suburbs of North Houston such as Klein, Texas, Spring, FM 1960 or The Woodlands. The Northside along with other neighborhoods inside 610 have recently become the focus of Gentrification in an effort to tear down historic homes to make room for modern living to accommodate the influx of young professionals drawn to the Downtown/Inner 610 Loop area. The Houston Light Rail is extending its route that will head north from the University of Houston–Downtown (UHD) along North Main St and Fulton St. The Northside consists primarily of Hispanic and African Americans with the exception of The Houston Heights neighborhood which has a large Caucasian presence. Notable residents of the Northside include Politician Barbara Jordan, Singer Kenny Rogers, Activist Mickey Leland, Rapper Slim Thug and Boxer George Foreman.

== Energy Corridor ==
The Energy Corridor is a district that lies along Memorial Drive and Eldridge Parkway in west Houston. The district is loosely bound by the area just north of IH-10 (the Katy Freeway) and Westheimer to the south, and extends from Kirkwood Road to the east and Fry Road to the West. The area is defined by many oil industry related companies, residential neighborhoods, restaurants and parks.

== Midtown ==
Midtown, located immediately south of downtown, is a recently redeveloped area with many newly constructed apartments and condominiums. The area is also home to Little Saigon, the center of the city's Vietnamese American commerce and businesses. Midtown is roughly bounded by I-45 on the north, SH-288 on the east, I-69/US-59 on the south, and Bagby Street on the west. Midtown is an official State of Texas Cultural Arts and Entertainment District, as of 2012.

== Uptown ==
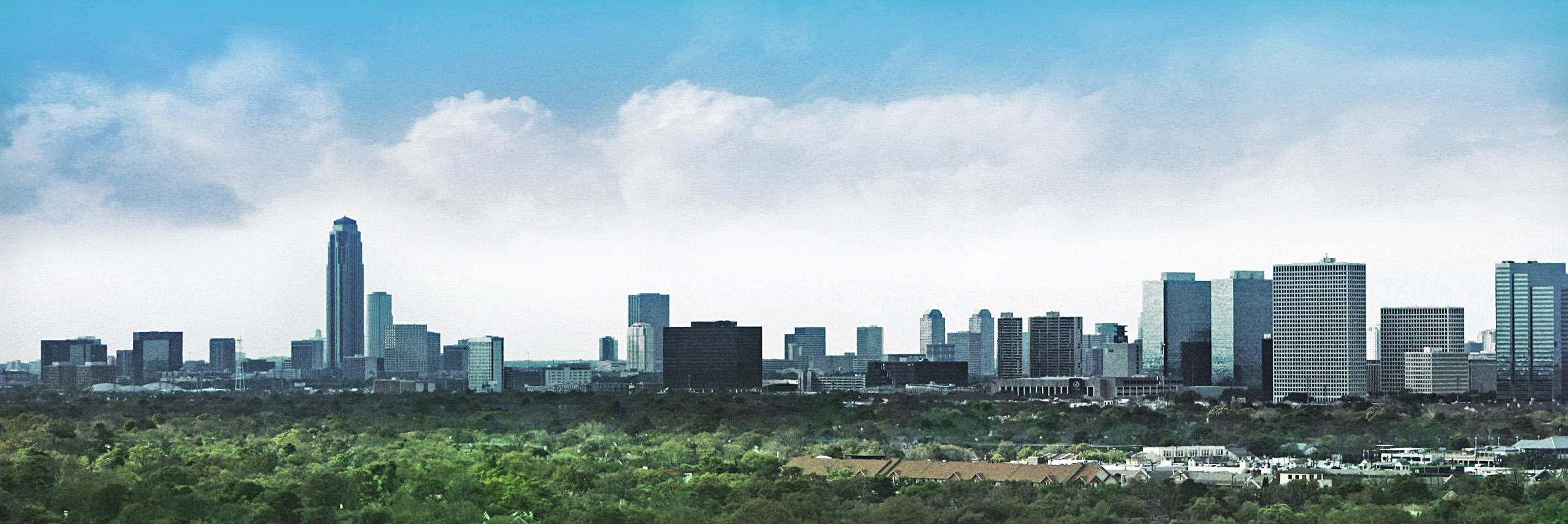
Uptown

Uptown is Houston's second-largest business district and home to the world-famous Williams Tower. The Williams Tower is said to be the tallest building outside of a CBD. The District is home to Houston's tallest condominium towers. Uptown has headquarter and subsidiary locations of Fortune 500 companies, high-end retailers, and local and international fashion designers.

Actual residents do not use the term Uptown. That is reserved for city officials and/or realtors. This is often referred to as the Galleria Area by residents in reference to the Houston Galleria in the middle of the district.

== Texas Medical Center ==
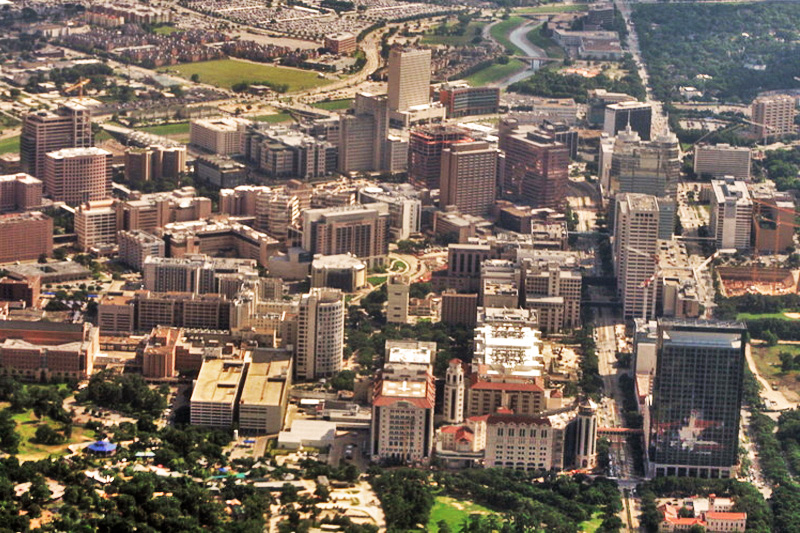
Texas Medical Center

The Texas Medical Center, about three miles (5 km) south of the Midtown area is the largest medical complex in the world. Bordering the Texas Medical Center are Reliant Park to the south and the Rice University/Rice Village area to the west.

== Museum District ==
The Museum District comprises more than 20 institutions, Hermann Park, the Houston Zoo and the Miller Outdoor Theatre. It is one of the most visited museum districts in the country. The Museum District covers a 1.5-mile (2.4 km) radius around Mecom Fountain in Hermann Park.

== The six "wards" ==
When Houston was established in 1837, the city's founders divided it into political geographic districts called "wards." The ward designation is the progenitor of the nine current-day Houston City Council districts.

Much of the predominantly African American First Ward was demolished and renovated as part of a gentrification effort. Much of the district is bordered by Houston Avenue, Interstates 10 and 45, and Washington Avenue. Because of rising land values, houses formerly located in Third Ward, Neartown, the West End and West University Place were relocated from their former land parcels and rehabilitated.

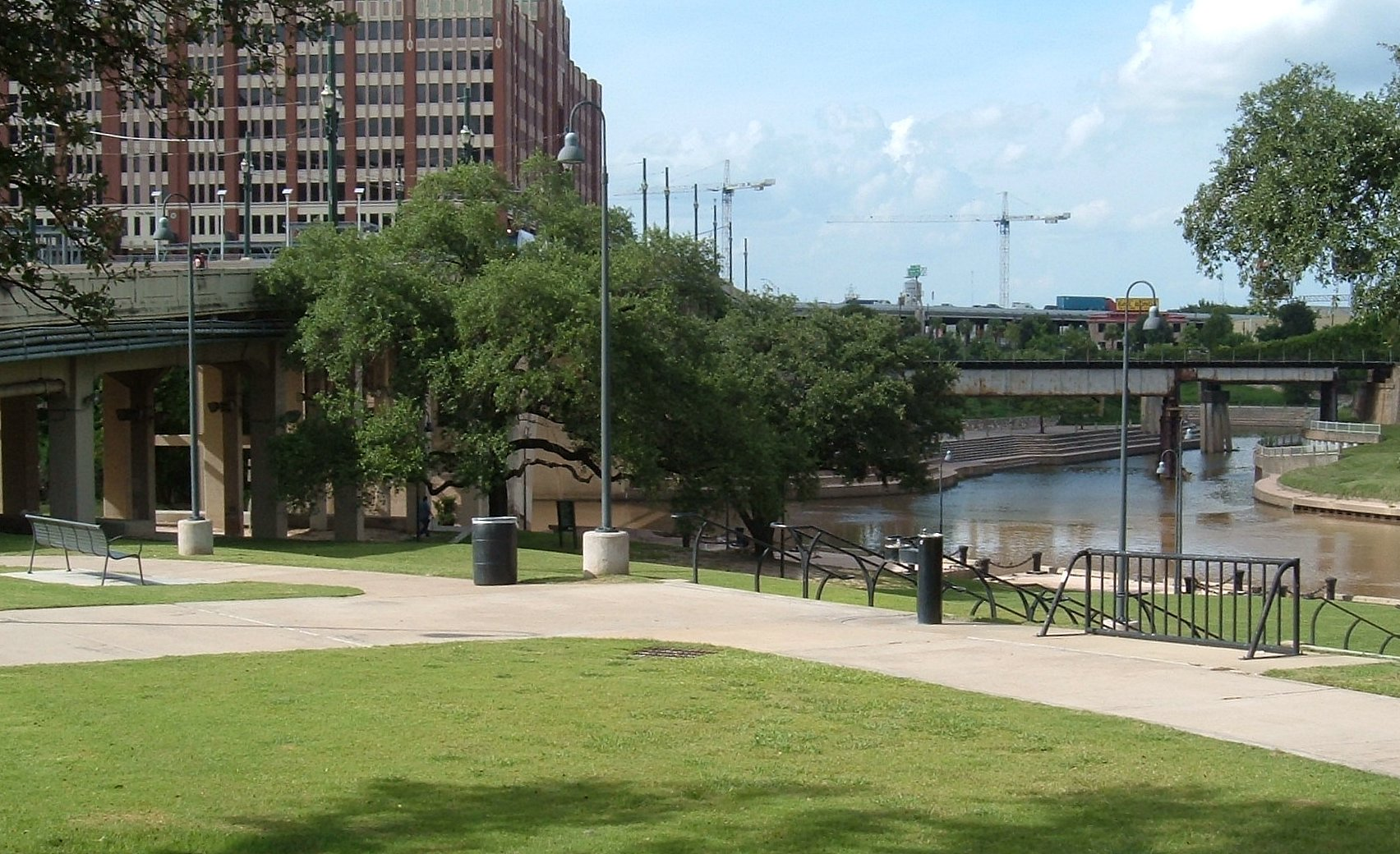
Allen's Landing park at Buffalo Bayou and White Oak in the First Ward.

The Second Ward, located east of downtown, was developed in the early 20th century. The Second Ward is predominantly a Hispanic community. The area has been undergoing gentrification due to its close proximity to downtown and entertainment venues. In the mid-to-late 2000s upper middle class residents moved into this East End area to take advantage of houses that are less expensive than west side houses. Second Ward is located in the East End district and is one of Houston's oldest neighborhoods.

The predominantly African American Third Ward, southeast of downtown, was home to one of the most affluent African American communities in the South after World War I. It is also where Texas Southern University and University of Houston are located. The Third Ward lies within two city council districts (D and I).

The Fourth Ward, known as Freedmen's Town for the freed slaves that settled there after the United States Civil War, was the first and most prominent African American community in Houston. It is home to the first campus of Booker T. Washington High School which was later moved to Independence Heights in northern Houston. Historically, the ward has been among the poorest areas of the inner-city, but is undergoing extensive gentrification because of its proximity to downtown. The ward included the Allen Parkway Village housing project, which was redeveloped into the Historic Oaks at Allen Parkway Village. The Freedmen's Town Historical District was created in 1988. Today, about 40 percent of the original wood-frame homes remain in the ward.

The Fifth Ward is another predominantly African American community originally settled by freed slaves. It too is undergoing gentrification. A section of the Fifth Ward, Frenchtown, once held the center of the Creole community in Houston.

The Sixth Ward is bounded by Memorial Drive to the south, Glenwood Cemetery to the west, Washington Avenue to the north, and Houston Avenue to the east. It was carved out of the Fourth Ward in 1877 as a residential area. There are many examples of Greek revival, Victorian, and Classical Revival architecture in the neighborhood, but due to extensive gentrification many are being demolished in favor of modern housing.

== Greenway Plaza ==
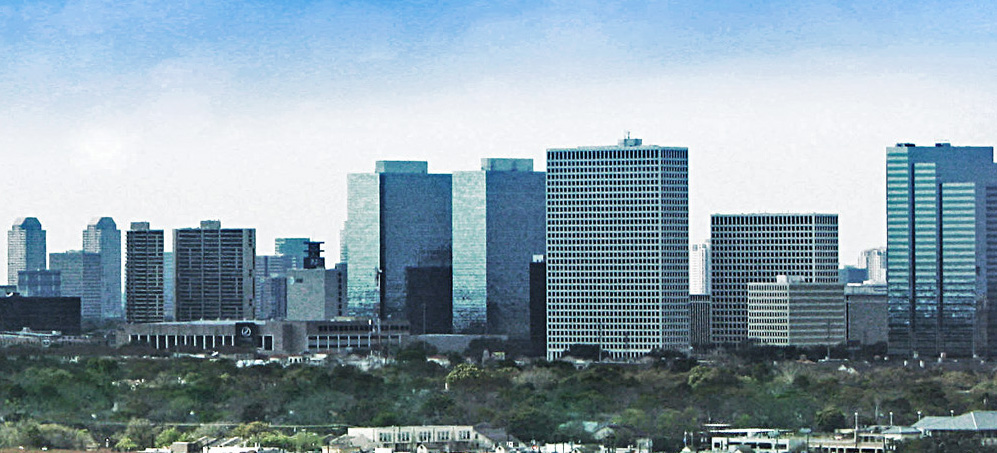
Skyline of Greenway Plaza.

The Greenway Plaza business district is west of Midtown and southwest of Downtown Houston. The district is home to Lakewood Church, the country's largest megachurch.

== Neartown ==
Neartown is an area located in west-central Houston, Texas and is one of the city's major cultural areas. The location has a distinctive character of eccentricity and a diverse population. The eastern–southeastern portion of Neartown (colloquially referred to as Montrose) is the center of Houston's gay and lesbian community, and known for its vintage shops, 1950s-style eateries and street art. The Neartown area traditionally hosted the Westheimer Street Festival, a colorful community gathering that was ended mostly due to gentrification. It is also the location of the Menil Collection and the University of Saint Thomas.

== Other notable communities ==
The historic Houston Heights, near downtown, has the highest point of elevation in the city. Like the smaller Woodland Heights neighborhood just to its east, it was originally a separate, independent suburb connected to Houston by streetcar. It was incorporated in 1891 and consolidated into the city of Houston in 1919. Even today it retains a ban on liquor sales and is a popular area for antique shopping. Like the neighboring Neartown, Houston Heights has long been a popular place for the artistic and gay and lesbian communities to live. Like other neighborhoods, the Heights has been experiencing gentrification pressures as the inner-loop grows, but residents concerned with historic preservation have resisted through the use of deed restrictions. Many of the Heights' Victorian houses and Craftsman bungalows are in high demand, especially those that have been remodeled. The Houston Heights is also home to the ArtCar Museum, a tourist attraction.

River Oaks is the city's most affluent area, often compared to Beverly Hills. Beyond Houston, it is the wealthiest neighborhood in the entire state and is home to many celebrities and political figures. Situated as it is between downtown and Uptown, River Oaks is a collection of mansions in a sea of high-rise apartments and lofts. Near and partially blending into River Oaks, the areas of Highland Village and Upper Kirby are home to many high-end shopping and dining venues.

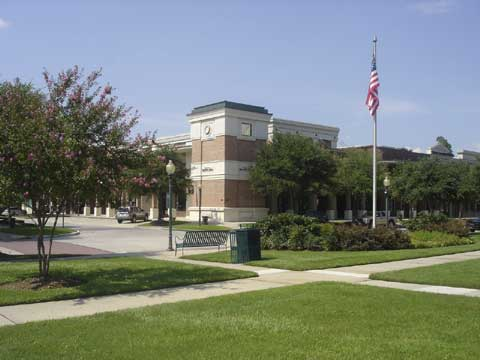
Kingwood Town Center in the Kingwood section of Houston.

To the west is the Memorial Area. The zip code for Memorial (77024) is the sixth wealthiest in Texas. It contains the largest of a series of affluent municipalities separate from but surrounded by the city of Houston, known as the Villages, which include Hedwig Village, Bunker Hill Village, Hunters Creek Village, Piney Point Village, Hilshire Village, and Spring Valley Village.

Clear Lake City is a master-planned community located in southeast Houston. It is home to the Lyndon B. Johnson Space Center, the University of Houston–Clear Lake and a very large upper-middle class Asian American community. The area was annexed into the city of Houston in 1979. League City, just south of this area, is home to a few water-side resorts.

To the northeast is the 14,000 acres (57 km^{2}) master-planned community of Kingwood, which was annexed by the city of Houston in 1996. Kingwood is the largest master-planned community in Harris County.

== Adjacent cities and suburbs ==
In addition to the "island cities" of Bellaire, West University Place, Southside Place and the Memorial Villages, there are several communities not part of Houston that are important to the metropolitan area.

=== Harris County ===
Pasadena is Houston's most populous suburb and the former location of "Gilley's", the honky-tonk bar that inspired the hit 1980 movie Urban Cowboy, which was filmed in Pasadena. Because of its location skirting the ship channel where most of the city's refineries are located, Pasadena is considered the backbone of Houston's enormous petrochemical complex. The nearby cities of Baytown, La Porte, which is home to the San Jacinto Monument, and Channelview are also host to many refineries and chemical plants. Other nearby cities are Deer Park, Galena Park, and South Houston.

Katy is about 30 minutes west of downtown. Many – live between Katy and Houston – those areas have "Katy" addresses and are referred to as the "Katy Area", while the city proper is known as "Old Katy". Because of this, the "Greater Katy" area has a population of over 250,000. Several developments are located in this area, including Cinco Ranch, Kelliwood, and various other communities. Much of the Katy area borders the western portion of George Bush Park, and it is home to Katy Mills Mall. The Katy area also stretches into northern Fort Bend County as well as southeast Waller County.

Cypress is an unincorporated area about 30 minutes northwest of downtown. Originally a grouping of rice farms and forest, this area has seen tremendous growth since the 1980s, almost all of it single-family housing. Cypress is also home of Cy-Fair ISD, metro Houston's second-largest school district. Other cities to the northwest are Jersey Village, a bedroom community at the intersection of Beltway 8 and the Northwest Freeway, and Tomball, a city of around 25,000 at the edge of Harris County.

Between Cypress and Katy lies Bridgeland, a large development in the early stages of construction. At completion, the developers expect a population of 65,000 in the area.

Humble, Texas is a town 20 miles (32 km) northeast of Downtown, adjacent to Bush Intercontinental Airport. Humble area has a sizable population, which includes Atascocita. While the city of Humble itself has a high crime rate, the area is one of the fastest growing and safest areas in Houston.

=== Fort Bend County ===
Sugar Land is a city southwest of Houston in northeast Fort Bend County, and is named for the former Imperial Sugar refinery. It is home to a number of international energy, software and product firms. It also is one of the fastest-growing and wealthiest cities in the state due to the numerous master-planned communities in the area, such as First Colony, New Territory, Greatwood, Sugar Creek, Sugar Lakes, Avalon, and Riverstone. Sugar Land has the most master-planned communities within Fort Bend County, which is home to the largest number of master-planned communities in the nation. In 2006, Sugar Land was ranked as the hottest place to live within the state of Texas and was third in the United States for that year, according to Money magazine, with the city receiving honors for its quality government services, affordable housing, and diversity (around one-quarter of Sugar Land's residents are Asian-American).

Stafford lies between Sugar Land and Houston, straddling Fort Bend and Harris counties. Stafford is home to many corporate campuses due to the lack of a municipal property tax. The Stafford Municipal School District, run by the city, is the only school district in Texas run by a municipal government.

In 1890, the land that now comprises Missouri City was advertised for sale in St. Louis, Missouri and surrounding areas as "a land of genial sunshine and eternal summer." Despite all the efforts to appeal to settlers from the "north", the first actual settlers came from Arlington, Texas – between Dallas and Fort Worth – in early 1894. Partially within Harris County, but mostly in neighboring Fort Bend County, the city boasts a large African American population. "Mo City", as it is sometimes called, has experienced significant "white flight". Most of this white flight has occurred in the northeastern portions of the city which are now predominantly black, and master-planned communities within the city such as Quail Valley and Lake Olympia boast significant white populations, and some of these communities have pockets of African-American and Asian-American residents. Sienna Plantation, an unincorporated community within Missouri City's extraterritorial jurisdiction, is culturally one with Missouri City.

=== Brazoria County ===
Pearland is a city located south of Houston in Brazoria County with a small portion in Harris County. Pearland is the fastest-growing city in Brazoria County – it has increased from about 19,000 to 39,000 residents in the 1990s alone (based on 2000 U.S. Census figures). It has since increased from 39,000 to 82,000 since 2000. It is home to companies such as Weatherford and Aggreko. It is the closest suburb to Downtown Houston and the Texas Medical Center (about 10 miles (16 km) away), which attracts professionals from the oil, gas, energy, medical and aerospace industries. Some of the master-planned communities found in the area are Silverlake, Silvercreek, and Shadow Creek Ranch.

=== Montgomery County ===
The Woodlands is a large master-planned community about 30 miles (48 km) north of Downtown Houston in Montgomery County. It is one of the largest and most popular master-planned communities in the country. Most of The Woodlands lies in the city of Houston's extraterritorial jurisdiction (ETJ) and the city limits of Shenandoah. Negotiations are under way with Houston and Conroe to the north to release The Woodlands from these ETJs and some in the community want The Woodlands to become a full city itself.

=== Galveston County ===
A popular day trip may include Galveston to visit Moody Gardens or the sandy beach. Before near destruction in 1900 Galveston was larger and wealthier than Houston, dubbed "The Wall Street of the Southwest" and on par with New Orleans as the Gulf Coast's premier city. Galveston is also home to the new Schlitterbahn Waterpark. The waterpark is located across the street from Moody Gardens. Galveston's vulnerability on a narrow barrier bar island led to the creation of the Port of Houston, made by dredging the shallow Buffalo Bayou and Galveston Bay to form a protected port some 40 miles (64 km) inland of the open Gulf and less than 10 miles (16 km) from Houston's central business district. Beach houses owned by Houstonians have sprung up in other cities along the Gulf of Mexico's shoreline. Another tourist hot spot is Kemah where visitors see the Kemah Boardwalk, which has many seafood restaurants and local tourist attractions. Kemah is surrounded by Galveston Bay to the east and Clear Lake Shores (a brackish-water boater's paradise with open pass through to Galveston Bay) to the west.

Five other cities lay along Interstate 45 on mainland Galveston County. League City, is the largest city in the county surpassing Galveston between 2000 and 2005, and the northernmost city in the county, with parts of it extending into Harris County. Dickinson, La Marque, Friendswood, and Texas City make up the other remaining cities in the county.
