= Vernon Lewis (American football) =

American football player (born 1970)

No. 43
- Position: Defensive back

Personal information
- Born: October 27, 1970 (age 56); Houston, Texas, U.S.
- Listed height: 5 ft 10 in (1.78 m)
- Listed weight: 192 lb (87 kg)

Career information
- High school: Kashmere (Houston)
- College: Pittsburgh
- NFL draft: 1993: undrafted

Career history
- New England Patriots (1993–1996)

Career NFL statistics
- Tackles: 41
- Fumble recoveries: 1
- Sacks: 1.5
- Stats at Pro Football Reference

Vernon Lewis Jr. (born October 27, 1970) is an American former professional football player who was a defensive back for four seasons with the New England Patriots of the National Football League (NFL). He played college football for the Pittsburgh Panthers.

== Early life and college ==
Vernon Lewis Jr. was born on October 27, 1970, in Houston, Texas. He attended Kashmere High School in Houston. He also participated in track and field in high school. Lewis was inducted into the Kashmere Former Athletes Association Hall of Fame in 2023.

Lewis was a three-year letterman for the Panthers of the University of Pittsburgh from 1990 to 1992. He recorded two interceptions in 1990 while also returning three punts for 34 yards. He returned two kicks for 39 yards in 1991. Lewis made three interceptions during the 1992 season.He majored in criminal justice in college.

== Professional career ==
After going undrafted in the 1993 NFL draft, Lewis signed with the New England Patriots on April 30. He played in ten games for the Patriots during the 1993 season. He appeared in 11 games in 1994, posting four solo tackles. He also played in one playoff game that year. Lewis appeared in all 16 games, starting two, in 1995, totaling 27 solo tackles, nine assisted tackles, 1.5 sacks, and one fumble recovery. He became a free agent after the season and re-signed with the Patriots on June 1, 1996. He was released on August 25, re-signed on August 30, released again on November 19, re-signed again on November 27, and placed on injured reserve on November 29, 1996. Overall, Lewis played in seven games for the Patriots in 1996, recording one solo tackle. He became a free agent after the 1996 season.
