= Eddie Foster (American football) =

American football player (born 1954)

No. 89
- Position: Wide receiver

Personal information
- Born: July 5, 1954 (age 72); Houston, Texas, U.S.
- Listed height: 5 ft 10 in (1.78 m)
- Listed weight: 185 lb (84 kg)

Career information
- High school: Kashmere (Houston)
- College: Houston (1973–1976)
- NFL draft: 1977: 8th round, 205th overall pick

Career history
- Houston Oilers (1977–1979); Tampa Bay Buccaneers (1980)*
- * Offseason or practice squad member only

Awards and highlights
- Second-team All-SWC (1976)

Career NFL statistics
- Receptions: 15
- Receiving yards: 208
- Stats at Pro Football Reference

Edward Ervin Foster (born June 5, 1954) is an American former professional football player who was a wide receiver for two seasons with the Houston Oilers of the National Football League (NFL). He was selected by the Oilers in the eighth round of the 1977 NFL draft after playing college football for the Houston Cougars.

== Early life ==
Edward Ervin Foster was born on June 5, 1954, in Houston, Texas. He played high school football at Kashmere High School in Houston, Texas and was a two-year starter. He earned All-State and Parade All-American honors as a senior wide receiver in 1972. Foster graduated from Kashmere High in 1973. He was inducted into the Kashmere Former Athletes Association “Ring of Honor” in 2018.

== College career ==
Foster was a member of the Houston Cougars of the University of Houston from 1973 to 1976 and a three-year letterman from 1974 to 1976. He was a wide receiver for his first three seasons before being shifted to tight end in 1976 due to his blocking ability. He caught three passes for 63 yards in 1973, 12 passes for 163 yards and one touchdown in 1974, 13 passes for 197 yards and two touchdowns in 1975, and 26 passes for 524 yards and four touchdowns in 1976. Foster's 20.2 yards per catch was the highest in the Southwest Conference (SWC) that season. He was named second-team All-SWC by the Associated Press in 1976. In 2012, the 1976 Houston Cougars football team was inducted into the University of Houston Hall of Honor.

== Professional career ==
Foster was selected by the Houston Oilers in the eighth round, with the 205th overall pick, of the 1977 NFL draft as a wide receiver. He started all 14 games for the Oilers in 1977, recording 15 receptions for 208 yards, one kick return for 33 yards, one fumble, and one fumble recovery. He was placed on injured reserve on September 8, 1978, and did not play any during the 1978 season. Foster appeared in the first game of the 1979 season and was released soon after on September 8, 1979.

Foster signed with the Tampa Bay Buccaneers on March 1, 1980. He was later released by the Buccaneers on August 15, 1980.

== Personal life ==
Foster received a Doctorate of Theology from Slidell Baptist Seminary. He has also spent time as a chaplain for the Texas Department of Criminal Justice.
