= Barbara Jordan Career Center =

Coordinates: 29.8119°N 95.3325°W

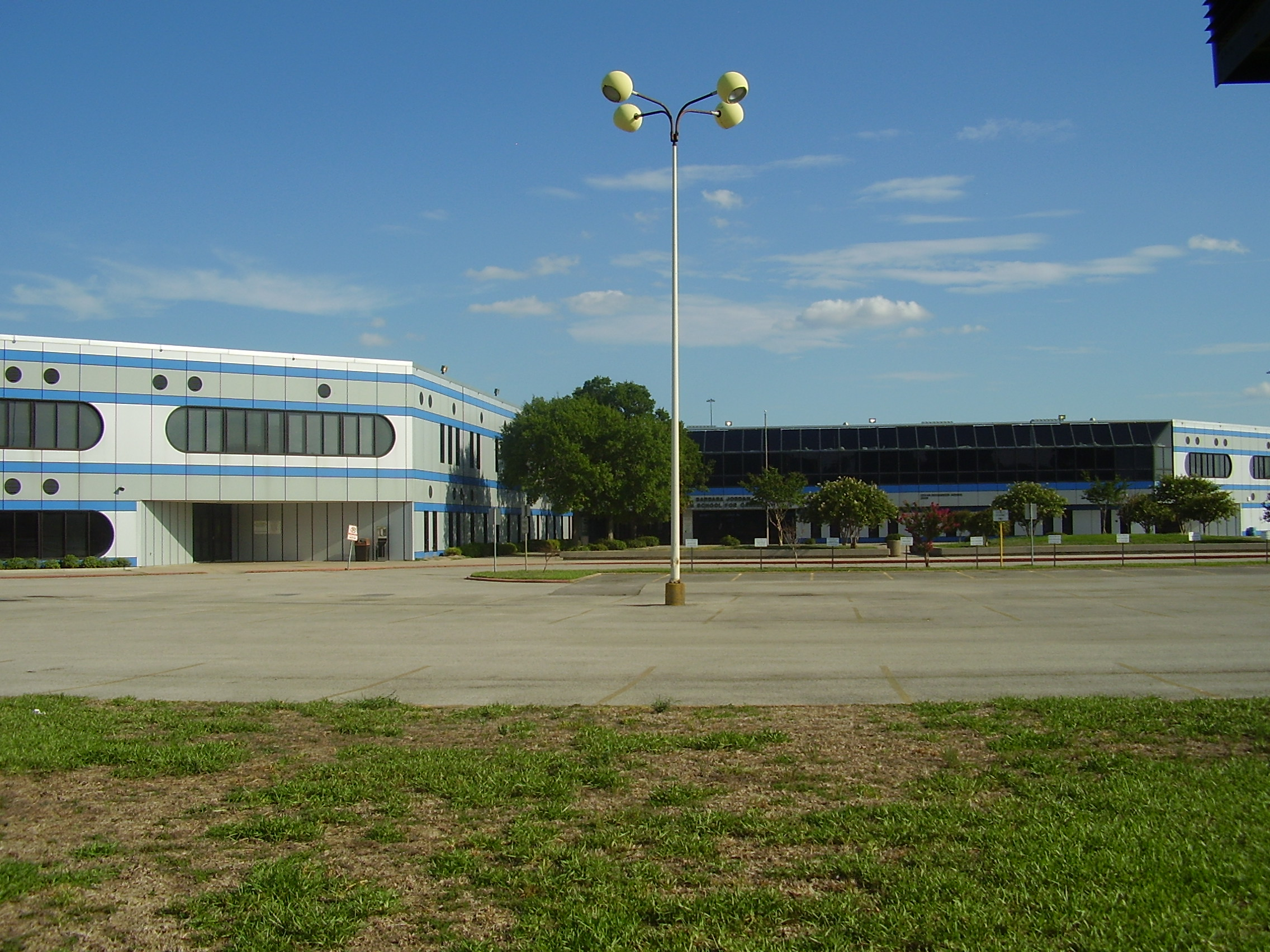
- Barbara Jordan High School for Careers

Location
- Houston, Texas; United States

Information
- Type: Public vocational school center
- Website: jordan.houstonisd.org

Barbara Jordan Career Center (BJCC), formerly Barbara Jordan High School for Careers (BJHSC), is a public vocational school center at 5800 Eastex Freeway (U.S. Highway 59) in Houston, Texas, United States. It is a part of the Houston Independent School District. Prior to July 1, 2018, the school served as its own self-contained secondary school. Since June 2018, Jordan is a regional career education hub for students enrolled at other HISD high schools. When it was its own high school it had a program for high school-aged deaf pupils.

The center was named after politician Barbara Jordan.

== History ==
Barbara Jordan High School was originally Houston Technical Institute up until 1979. Houston Technical Institute split its job oriented magnet program between two schools, Milby High School and Barbara Jordan High School For Careers (original name). The 1979/80 class was the last graduating class of Houston Technical Institute. The 1980/81 class was the first graduating class of Barbara Jordan High School For Careers.

During the 1984–1985 school year, the percentages of Fs at 23 of 26 HISD high school campuses decreased in the spring semester because of the state-implemented No Pass No Play rule, which requires students in high school athletic programs to attain passing grades. At Jordan and Sterling High School, the percentages of Fs remained the same.

In 2011, Andria Schur, the principal of Barbara Jordan, said that she was closing the auto-collision program at Jordan at the end of the 2010–2011 school year. Schur said that this was due to state budget cuts and because the school was "trying to shift to more 21st-century jobs." Schur suggested that students in the program instead enroll in Advanced Placement courses in art history and studio art. According to Mr. Gonzales, the teacher of the auto-collision program, if the program is eliminated, there will be no schools in HISD that will offer it. Gayle Fallon, the president of the Houston Federation of Teachers, said that HISD was trying to push the vocational programs into the domain of Houston Community College. Gonzales and some of his students attended an HISD board meeting, asking the board to make the steps to have the program saved. As of 2011 the school continued to offer automobile collision/repair courses.

=== Transitioning into career hub ===
In 2015, it was decided that Barbara Jordan would be transitioning from a career magnet school to a regional career hub; the school will no longer take full-time enrolled students.

The school will provide students from area high schools with real-world experiences in a variety of professions, including Auto/Diesel, Audio/Visual, Construction Management, Cosmetology, Culinary Arts, Marketing/Entrepreneurship, STEM (Electronics), and Welding.

Students will spend half their day at their home school taking required academic classes and the other half at Jordan participating in career curriculum.

Each school year after the 2014–2015 school year, Barbara Jordan will lose a grade level. For the 2015–2016 school year, there were only grades 10,11, and 12. For the 2016–2017 school year, there are only grades 10 and 11. For the 2017–2018 school year, there will only be 12th grade. The last class to graduate from Barbara Jordan High School for Careers will be the Class of 2018.

The students at Furr, Heights (former Reagan High), Sam Houston, Kashmere, Northside (former Davis High), North Forest, Washington, and Wheatley high schools will have priority for access to Jordan's programs. Students at those schools will have the opportunity to take core courses at their home campus while spending a portion of their day at Barbara Jordan for specialized programming in industrial construction and the health professions.

By 2018 a new Barbara Jordan building was being constructed.

== Demographics ==
During the 2004–2005 school year, Jordan had a total of 1,261 full-time enrolled students .

- 60% were African-American
- 39% were Hispanic
- 1% was White American
- Less than 1% were Asian American
- Less than 1% were Native American

79% of the students qualified for free or reduced lunch.

In 2013, while Jordan still accepted students for full-time education, most of the students were zoned to Sam Houston, Kashmere, and Wheatley high schools; that year 300 students were zoned to Kashmere and 270 were zoned to Wheatley. In 2015 many zoned to Kashmere continued enrolling in Jordan full time. As of 2005 some students in other parts of Houston ISD transferred to Jordan to escape home schools that do not have a good academic performance, causing the attendance figures of those schools to suffer.

== School uniforms ==
While the school accepted full-time students, they were required to wear school uniforms .

== Before Jordan ==
Jordan had no formal feeder patterns as it was a magnet school.

When it had the deaf program most of the deaf students originated from the T. H. Rogers School, since that school has the deaf programs for Kindergarten through 8th grade.
