= Key Middle School (Texas) =

School in America

Coordinates: 29.811577°N 95.330178°W

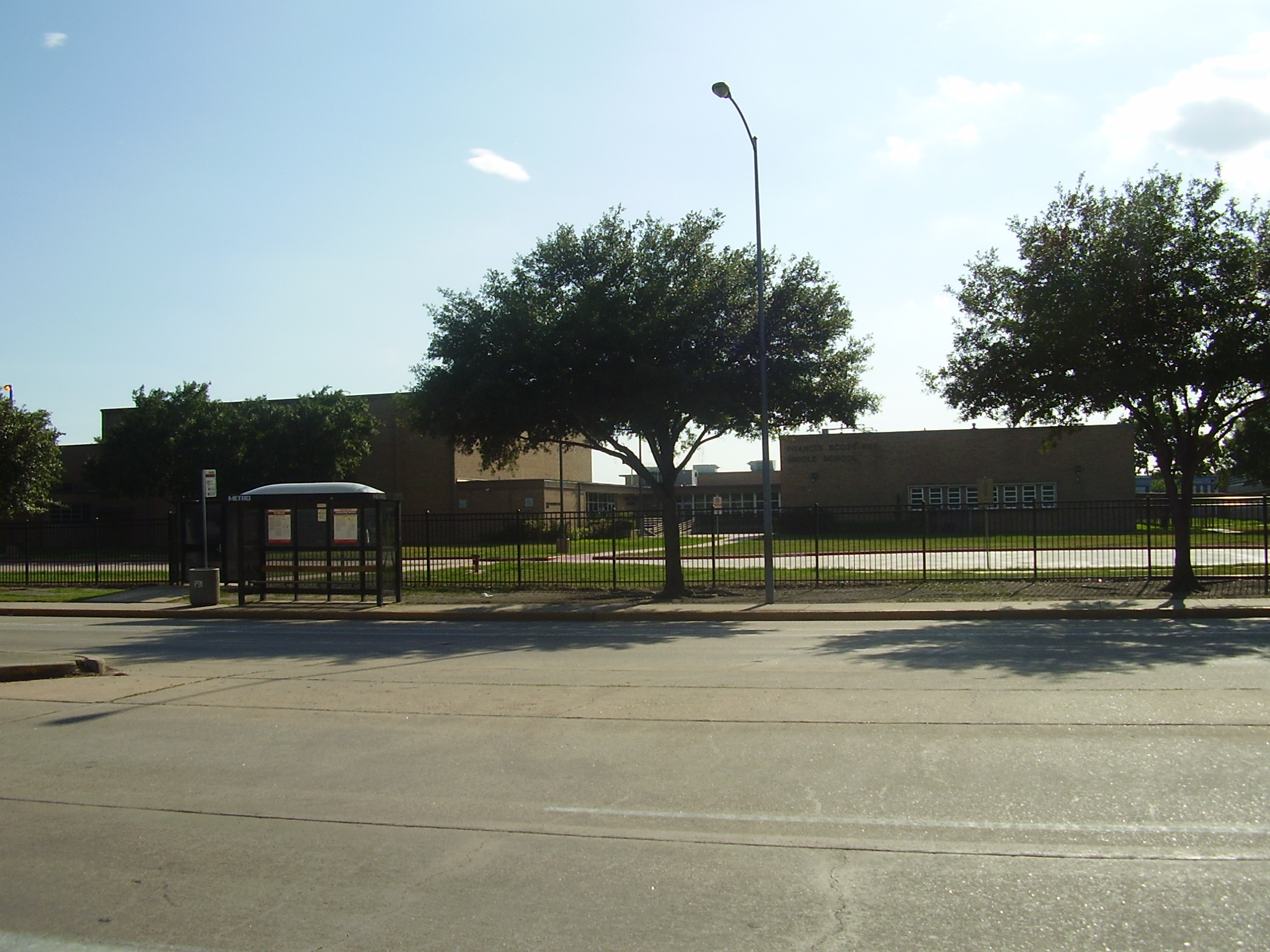

Information
- Established: 1957; 69 years ago
- Website: key.houstonisd.org

Francis Scott Key Middle School is a public middle school in the Kashmere Gardens area of Houston, Texas, United States. It is within the Houston Independent School District.

== History ==
Kashmere High School opened in 1957 at 4000 North Kelley Street. In 1968 Kashmere moved to a new campus at 6900 Wileyvale Road and the North Kelley campus became Key Junior High School, which was named for Francis Scott Key.

In 1991 Key was the first school in HISD to introduce school uniforms. At the time, they were not required, but encouraged.

In 2007 employees, students, and visitors complained of watery eyes, headaches, and other symptoms. The district closed the school in late September 2007 to test the school for mold; students attended Fleming Middle School. In September 2007 Sheila Jackson Lee, a U.S. congressperson, had asked the Centers for Disease Control (CDC) and the Environmental Protection Agency (EPA) to visit Key. Afterwards HISD called inspectors from the CDC to inspect Key. On Wednesday, March 26, 2008 the district re-opened Key. Air quality tests performed in weeks around March 2008 revealed limited mold spores. Sheila Jackson Lee said that she felt that the district should not re-open the campus by March 2008. The district spent about US$3 Million to clean Key.

In May 2008 Abelardo Saavedra, superintendent of the district, said that he considered closing Key; sixth graders would be sent to elementary school campuses while seventh and eighth graders would attend Kashmere High School. Parents and teachers want HISD to instead tear down the campus and rebuild it.

In 2010, after reviewing allegations of teacher-led cheating on the Texas Assessment of Knowledge and Skills (TAKS) test and allegations of property theft, the district reassigned employees and denied Key employees bonus pay. Some of the employees involved were working at Kashmere High School but had previously worked at Key. On Thursday April 8, 2010 the district voted to fire Mable Caleb, who was a principal of Kashmere but had been the principal of Key during the period which had been scrutinized. Five other HISD employees were fired. However an administrative law judge ruled in 2014 that Caleb was not guilty of the charges. Caleb sued HISD, and in 2016 the two parties agreed to a settlement in which she received $550,000.

In 2013 the North Forest Independent School District was annexed into HISD. Portions of land, including Settegast, were rezoned from Forest Brook Middle School (the only remaining comprehensive middle school in NFISD) to Key.

== Neighborhoods zoned to Key ==
Residents of the Houston Gardens, Kashmere Gardens, and Settegast areas are zoned to Key.

== Feeder patterns ==
Elementary schools feeding into Key include:

- Cook
- Kashmere Gardens
- McGowen (formerly Houston Gardens)
- Paige (formerly Bowie)

(partial)

- Elmore
- Hilliard
- Isaacs
- Ross

Most areas in Key feed into Kashmere High School. Some areas feed into Northside High School (formerly Davis High School).
