= Harris Health System =

American hospital network

Harris Health
Department overview
- Formed: January 1, 1966
- Jurisdiction: Harris County, Texas
- Headquarters: Bellaire, Texas
- Department executive: Esmaeil Porsa, president and CEO
- Website: www.harrishealth.org

Current logo

Harris County Hospital District logo (prior to 2012)

The Harris Health System, previously the Harris County Hospital District (HCHD), is a governmental entity with taxing authority that owns and operates three hospitals and numerous clinics throughout Harris County, Texas, United States, including the city of Houston. The entity's administrative offices are in Bellaire, Texas.

Harris Health System is an integrated delivery system that provides healthcare services open to all residents of Harris County, Texas. It is the first accredited healthcare institution in Harris County to be designated as an NCQA Medical Home and one of the largest in the country.

== History ==
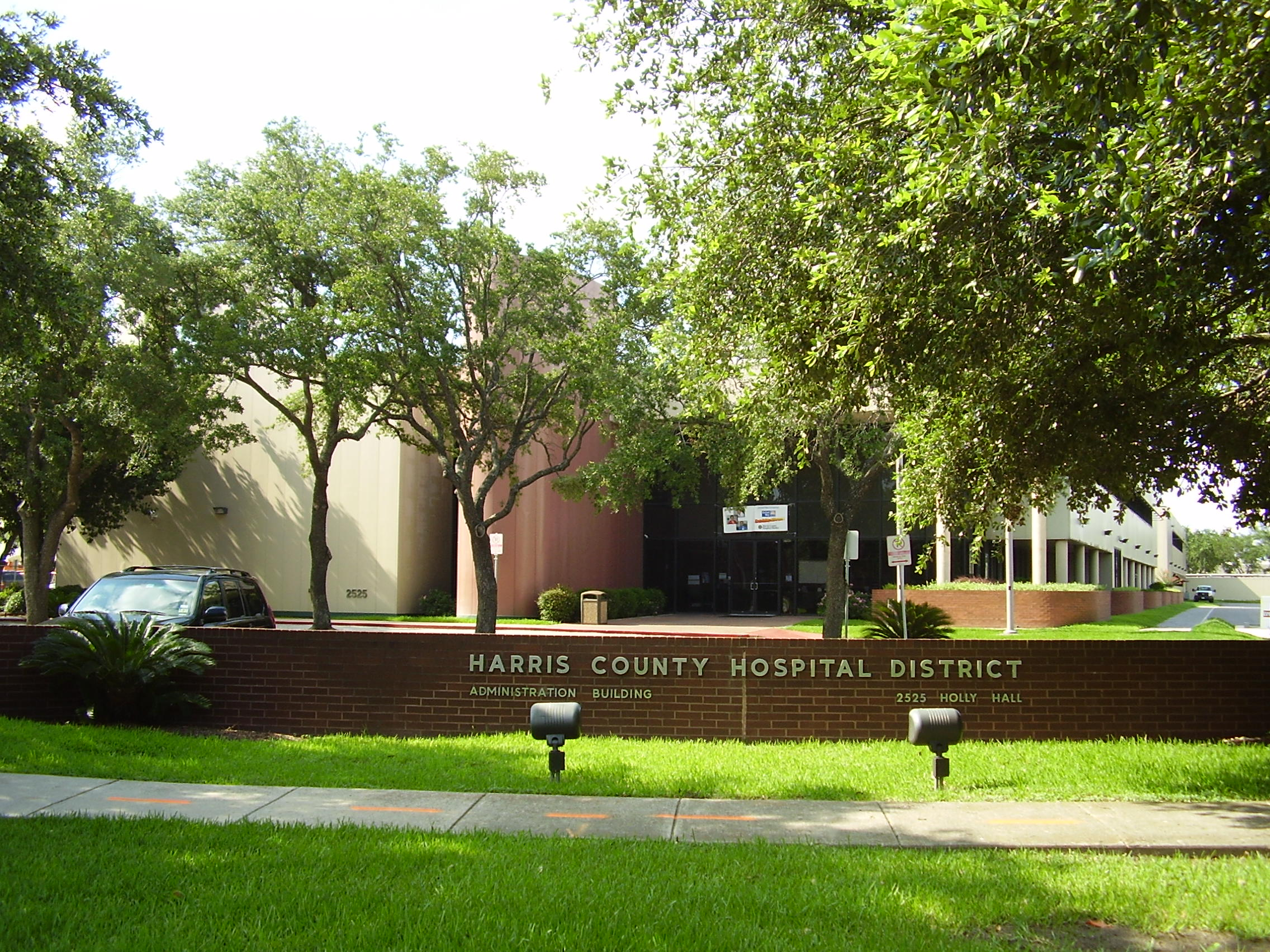
Former Harris Health System Administration Building

The Harris County Hospital District was created by voter referendum on November 20, 1965 and was formally designated as a political subdivision with taxing authority on January 1, 1966. Its creation is largely attributed to the publication of Jan de Hartog's novel The Hospital, which described the horrific conditions of the Jefferson Davis Charity Hospital. The new district replaced an existing city-county system in which the two governmental bodies shared funding responsibility. Quentin Ronald Mease was a founder and chairman of the Harris County Hospital District and chaired the Harris County Hospital Foundation.

A Hospital District is a governmental entity in Texas, established pursuant to the Texas Constitution or the general statutes of Texas, and its purpose is to provide medical care to the needy residents of a particular county.

By 1989, the hospital had exceeded U.S. federal patient mortality rates for two years in a row; Ben Taub and Jefferson Davis were the sole Houston hospitals above their predicted mortality rates. Roger Widmeyer, the district spokesperson, said "We are a very unique hospital because of the number of acutely ill patients we receive. We think the taxpayers understand that we handle a lot of sick people here. A lot of the people we treat don't come to the hospitals until they are very, very sick."

By 1990, when Lyndon Baines Johnson General Hospital (LBJ) received an emergency room and Ben Taub General Hospital received an emergency care facility, the district began to assign county residents to each hospital depending on zip code. Residents of northern areas in the county, including patients treated at Acres Home, Settegast, Bordersville and Baytown clinics were assigned to LBJ. Residents of southern areas, including patients at Casa de Amigos, Martin Luther King, Ripley House, Strawberry Road, and West End county clinics were assigned to Ben Taub.

In January 2012, board members of Harris County Hospital District approved a rebranding to Harris Health System. The rebranding became effective in promotion of the system starting September 6, 2012.

== Hospitals ==
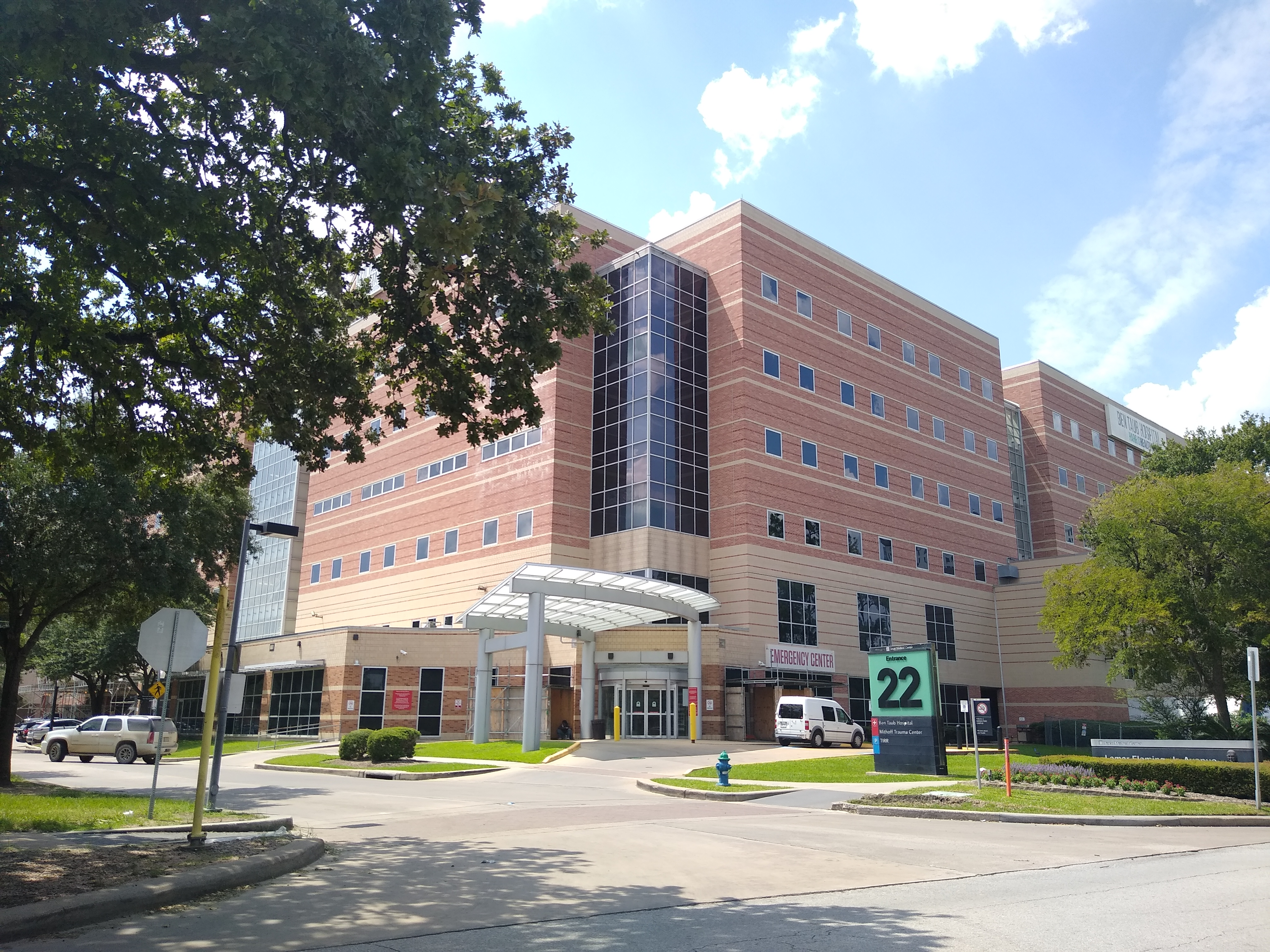
Ben Taub General Hospital

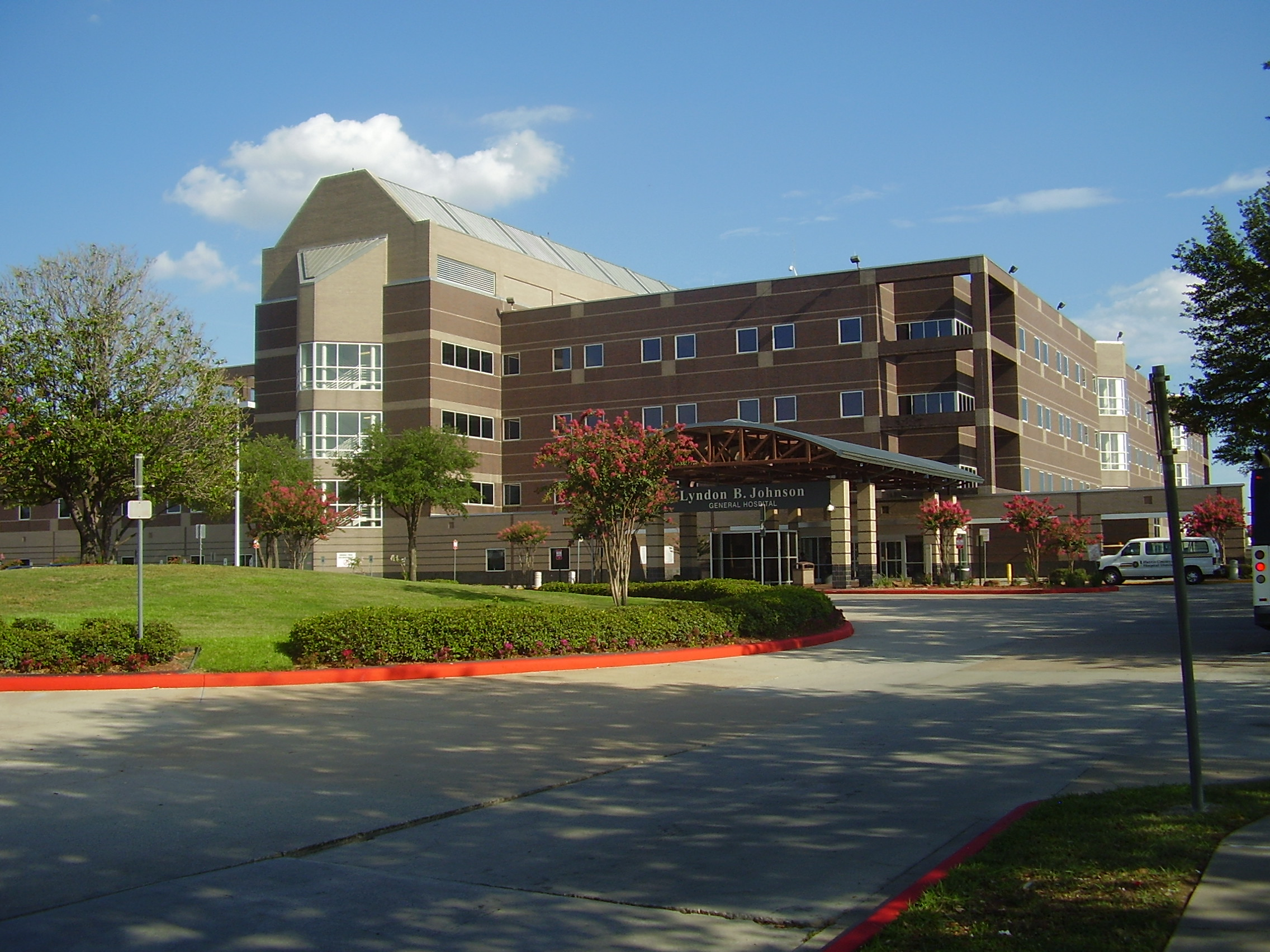
Lyndon B. Johnson General Hospital

Its two main hospitals serve approximately one million under-insured and uninsured people, nearly a quarter of the entire population of Harris County, the third most-populous county in the United States. Harris County includes Houston, the fourth largest city in the United States. Ben Taub General Hospital is a level I trauma center with 650 licensed beds. It is located in the Texas Medical Center, the largest medical complex in the world, and is staffed by faculty, residents, and students of Baylor College of Medicine.

Lyndon Baines Johnson General Hospital is expanding to a 450 bed general hospital with a level 1 trauma center located northeast of Downtown Houston. It is staffed by the faculty, residents, and students of The University of Texas Health Science Center at Houston and The University of Texas M. D. Anderson Cancer Center. After Jefferson Davis Hospital closed, LBJ opened in 1989. An outpatient center next to the hospital opened in 2013.

Quentin Mease Community Hospital has 25 beds for long-term physical rehabilitation and 24 beds in its geriatric services program. It is staffed by the faculty, residents, and students of The University of Texas Health Science Center at Houston and Baylor College of Medicine.

In August 2009 Memorial Hermann Hospital announced possible plans to sell its Southwest Hospital in Greater Sharpstown to the Harris Health System, which, if purchased would make the hospital its third general hospital. The county withdrew its bid in September 2009.

== Clinics ==
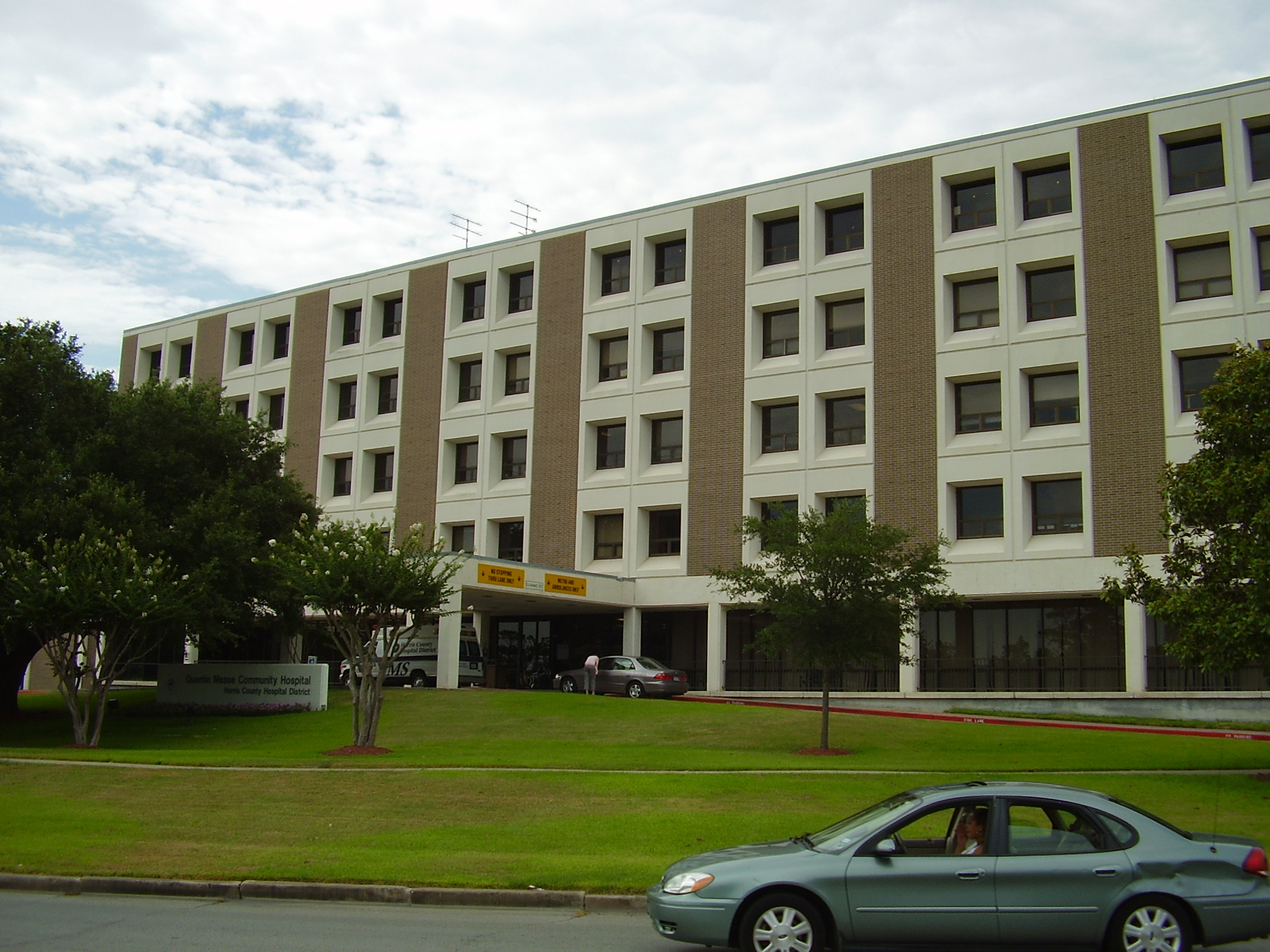
Former Quentin Mease Community Hospital in the Third Ward, Houston

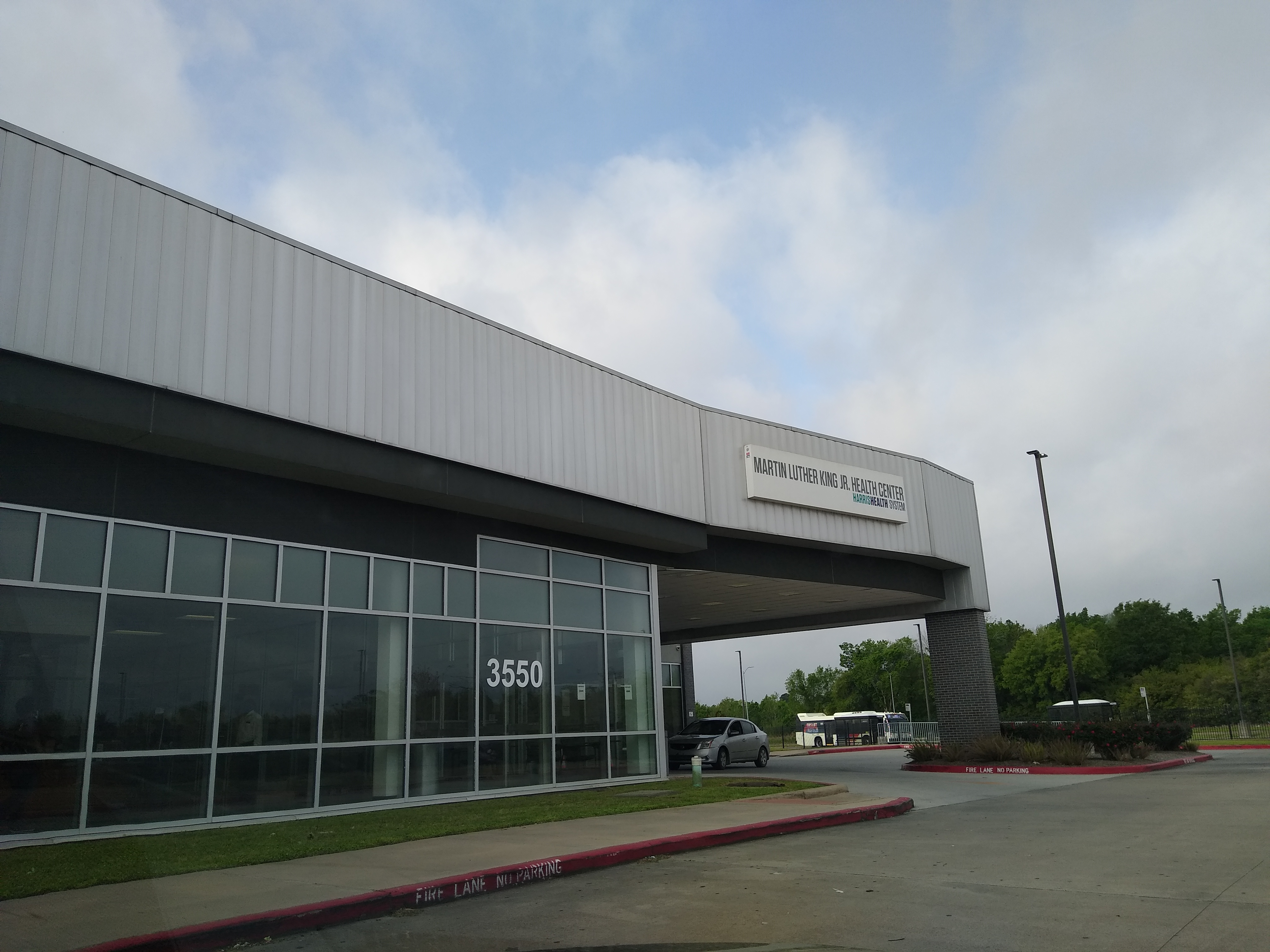
Martin Luther King Jr. Health Center

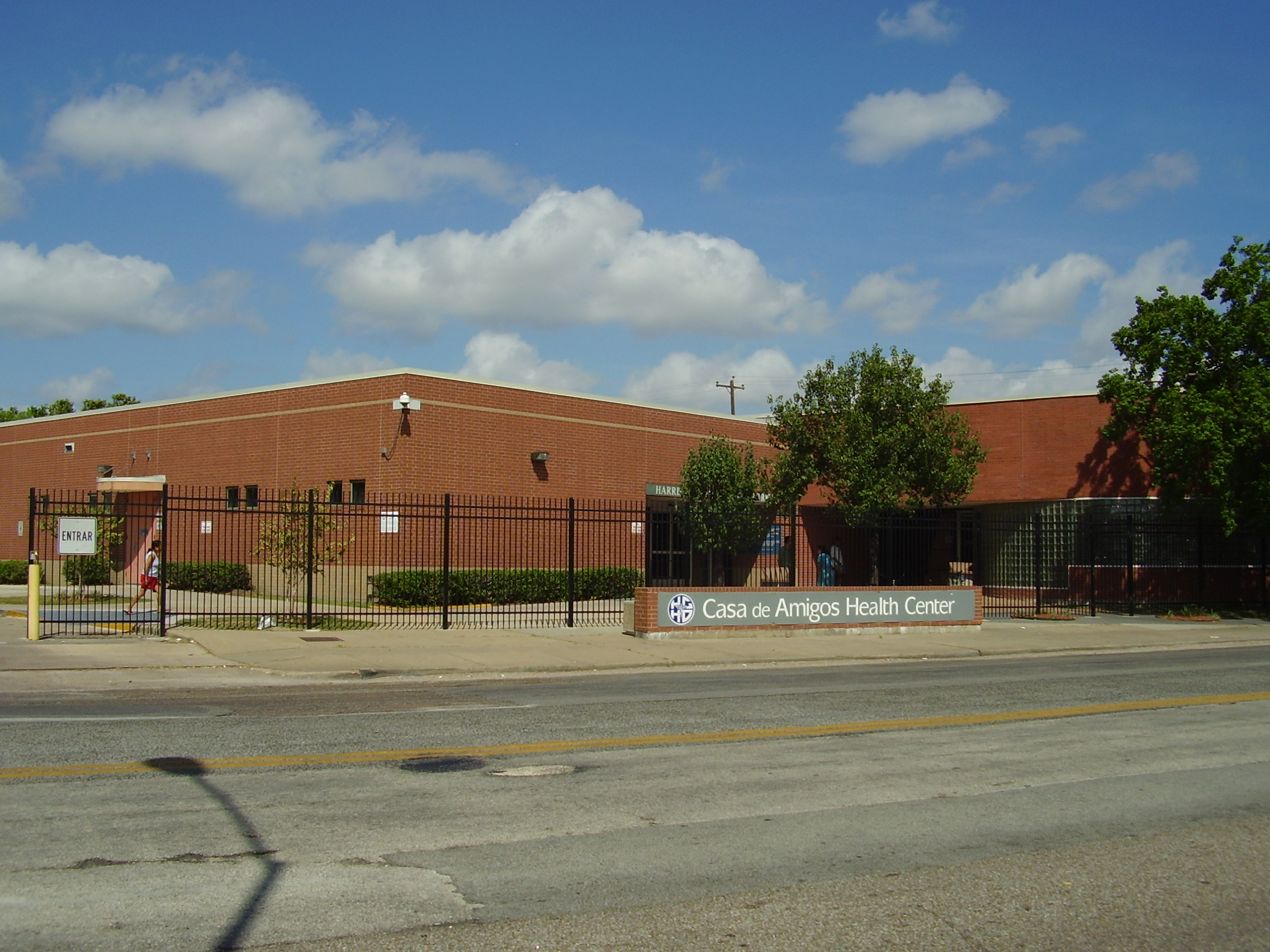
Casa de Amigos Health Center

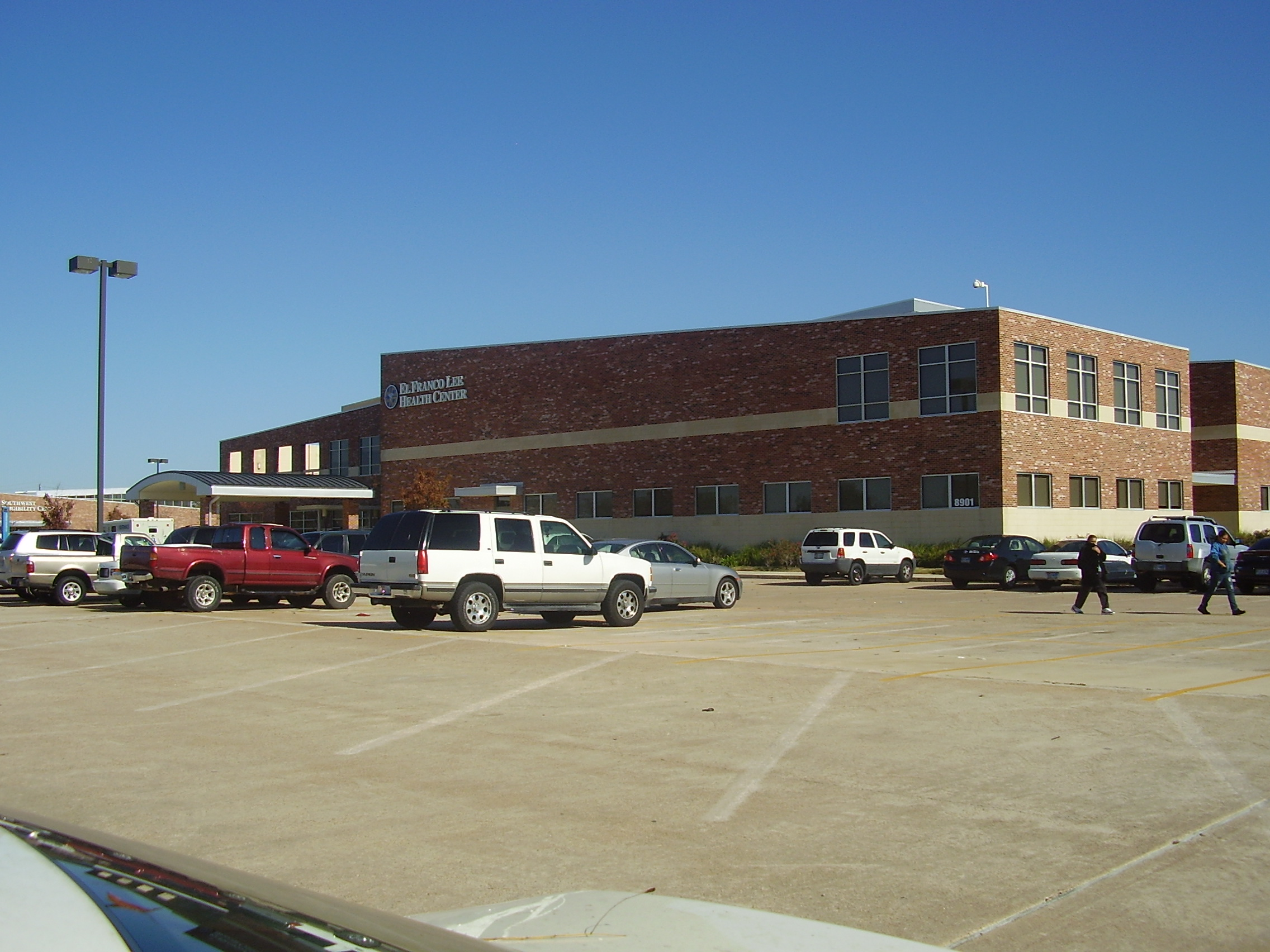
El Franco Lee Health Center

Harris Health System operates 12 Community Health Centers, a dental center, eight School-Based Clinics, 13 homeless shelter clinics and four mobile health clinics. These clinics offer primary care as well as a variety of specialty care such as psychiatry, dentistry, obstetrical/gynecological, podiatry, ophthalmology, pharmacy, psychiatry and counseling, laboratory and x-ray services, HIV/AIDS case management, and a variety of nutrition, health education and social services. Thomas Street Health Center was the first freestanding HIV/AIDS clinic in the United States, and today treats nearly a third of all HIV/AIDS patients in Harris County.

Community-based health care centers include:

- Baytown: Baytown Health Center
- Houston
  - Acres Home Health Center - The health center opened on May 17, 1971.
  - Casa de Amigos Health Center
  - El Franco Lee Health Center (opened on May 19, 2009)
  - Gulfgate Health Center (opened on September 18, 2000)
  - Martin Luther King Health Center
  - Northwest Health Center (formerly the West End Health Center, opened 1974)
  - Settegast Health Center
  - Thomas Street Health Center - It opened in 1989 and serves AIDS patients.
  - Valbona Health Center (formerly People's Health Center)
- Humble: E. A. "Squatty" Lyons Health Center (opened 1991)
- Pasadena:
  - Strawberry Health Center
  - Pediatric and Adolescent Health Center - Pasadena
- Unincorporated areas
  - Aldine Health Center
  - Cypress Health Center (Cypress)
  - Danny Jackson Health Center (Greater Katy)
  - Pediatric & Adolescent Health Center - Bear Creek

Prior to 1991 the county operated a clinic in the Bordersville area of Houston. In 1991 the Lyons Clinic opened and the county closed the Bordersville clinic. The county's Ripley clinic closed as a result of the opening of the Gulfgate clinic in 2000.

The Martin Luther King Health Center first opened on April 28, 1972. Quentin Mease opened in 1983. At one point, the MLK health center was located on the first and third floors of Quentin Mease. MLK's standalone facility on Cullen Boulevard was scheduled to open in 2009 and free space at Quentin Mease. On May 14, 2010, MLK relocated to a site in southern Houston, on Swingle Road.

Acres Homes clinic got a $3.5 million expansion that broke ground in 1999.

As of 2011 the dental centers take patients of ages 16 and up with patients under that age referred to the City of Houston's dental clinics.

== Administrative office ==
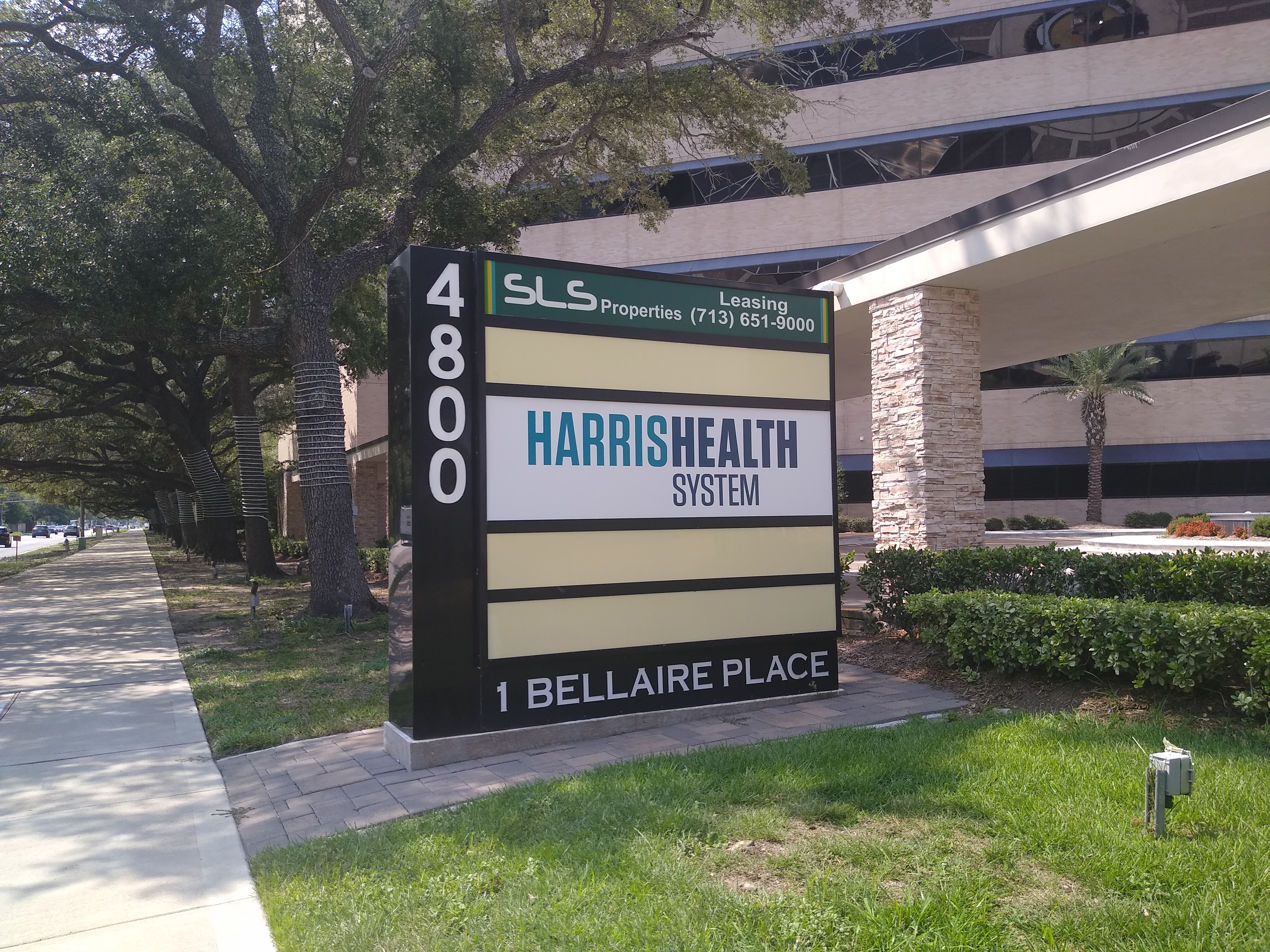
Harris Health System offices

Its current administrative office is the Fournace facility in Bellaire, Texas. The facility has ten floors, of which the district occupies seven. The district moved employees from the 2525 Holly Hall, 9240 Kirby and 9250 Kirby facilities, all in the city of Houston, into Fournace. In addition to 2525 Holly Hall and 9250 Kirby, 2636 S. Loop in Houston once housed the Community Health Choice offices.

In 1992 the district moved into the Holly Hall building, which has 110,000 square feet (10,000 m^{2}) of space. In 2017 the district named the Holly Hall building after Elvin Franklin Jr.

== See also ==
- Parkland Health & Hospital System (Dallas County)
- JPS Health Network (Tarrant County)
- University Health System (Bexar County)
