= Settegast, Houston =

Neighborhood of Houston, Texas

Coordinates: 29.8416°N 95.2931°W

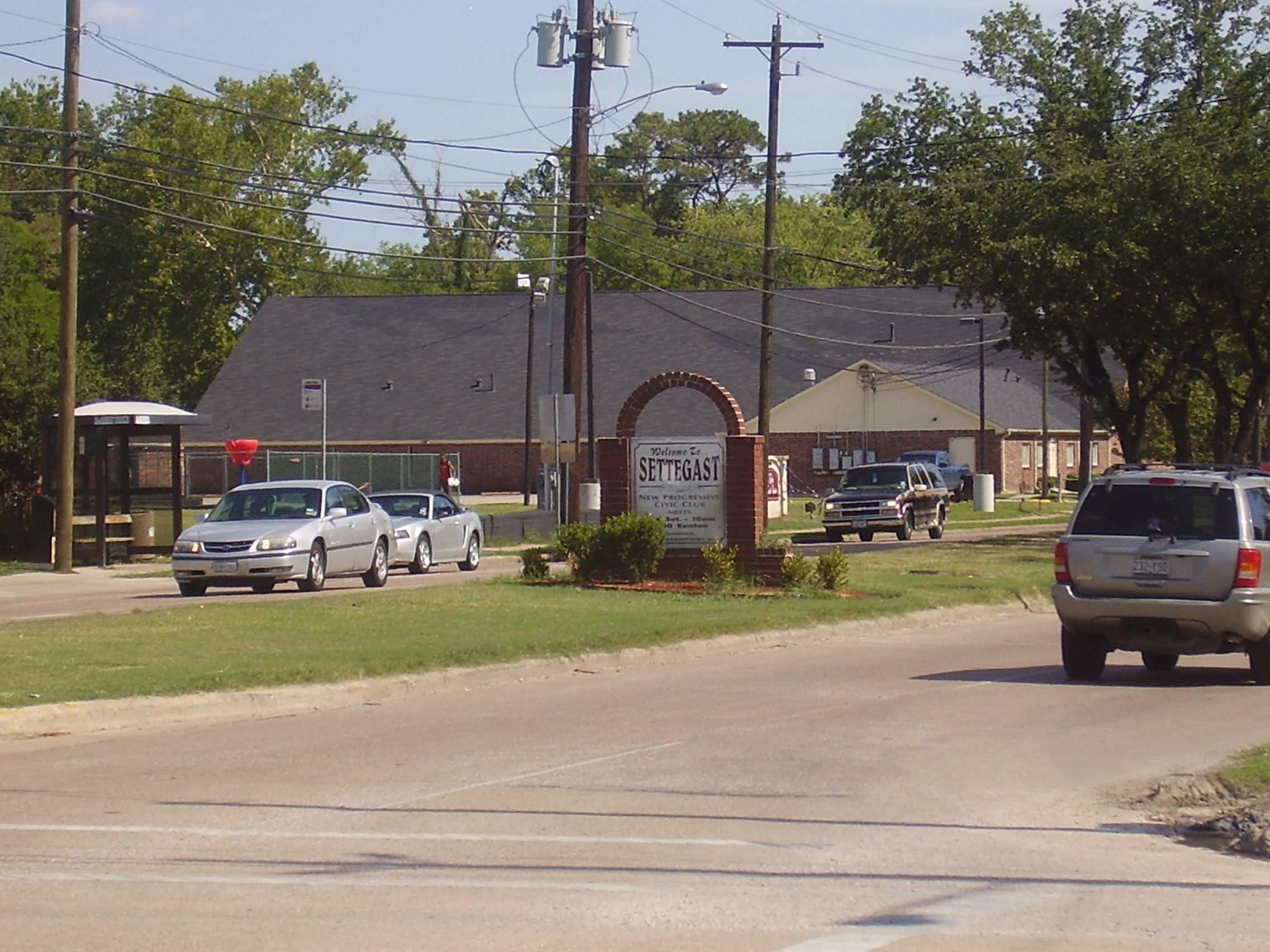
Settegast

Settegast is a neighborhood in northeast Houston; it has an average population density between one and five. The community is bordered by the 610 Loop, the Union Pacific Railroad Settegast Yard, and the old Beaumont Highway. The community has many small, wood-framed houses and empty lots. Habitat for Humanity has a prominent stake in the area, and a community garden is underway. There are few commercial and industrial uses within Settegast. Also, contemporary housing has started to arise within new construction in the area. The City of Houston designated Settegast as a Houston HOPE neighborhood.

== History ==
Settegast was first developed in 1892 by German immigrants William J. and Julius J. Settegast, who had become interested in land speculation back in 1872.

Settegast was further developed as a planned community in the 1940s, and had streets and lots that were platted during the same decade. Settegast was settled by African Americans seeking land on the northeast side of Houston.

The City of Houston annexed Settegast in 1949 and began providing sewer trunk lines in 1965.

In 1966, the Houston-Harris County Economic Opportunity Organization (H-HCEOO) conducted a survey of the Settegast neighborhood termed "The Settegast Report", which was conducted to "gain a better understanding of the problems and issues in one of the city's poorest neighborhoods".

Surveyors found, "though 80% of respondents in Settegast owned their homes, the term 'ownership' must be used in the loosest possible sense...[because] contracts for deed were designed in such a way that borrowers found it impossible to reach the agreed-upon amount because of a multitude of hidden fees and exorbitant finance charges,".

Surveyors found that streamlined sanitation was nonexistent as, "70% of residents received their water from shallow wells that were often contaminated from septic tanks and sewage backups from outhouses". After neighbors found that contaminated well water was being sold to residents, residents, "went to City Hall and demanded a city water supply to replace their contaminated one".

Similarly, surveyors found Settegast was a food desert and that two-thirds of the population did not have a high-school education.

According to Wesley G. Phelps' book A People's War on Poverty: Urban Politics and Grassroots Activists in Houston, an arsonist set fire to the H-HCEOO community center in Settegast on January 17, 1967; moreover, "two thousand completed voter registration forms that had yet to be turned over to the tax assessor-collector" were found.

In 1967, a deputy constable ordered a pregnant resident out of her home due to an eviction order, which the resident claimed the deputy constable, "shoved, cursed, and handcuffed" her and "unfairly booked [her] for aggravated assault". About 2000 Settegast residents met at a local Baptist church and signed a petition "calling for the immediate dismissal of the said deputy constable". The deputy constable was not dismissed, though a protest had happened as a response to the resident's eviction

When Mayor Welch and Congressman Bush "erroneously charged H-HCEOO with using federal funds to stage the protest, the local newspaper repeated the charge and provoked a firestorm of criticism aimed at the organization...[which made] Settegast suff[er] a major setback". "In the wake of the demonstration at City Hall against the treatment of Betty Gentry, members of the Settegast Civic Club, an organization that had existed longer than the poverty program and included several business and religious leaders, expressed fear that protest activity in Settegast was going too far and Earl Allen and his staff were encouraging violence".

== Cityscape ==
Settegast is bounded to the south by the 610 Loop and the Beaumont Freeway, and to the west by a Union Pacific Railroad switching yard.

Rafael Longoria and Susan Rogers of the Rice Design Alliance said that Settegast could be described as "rurban", a word coined in 1918 to describe an area with a mix of urban and rural characteristics. Longoria and Rogers said that the original frame houses, described by the two as "modest," are "sparsely" distributed throughout Settegast. As of 2008, much of the area remained undeveloped, and guinea hens and horses graze on the open fields. Many churches are located in the neighborhood; as of 2008, it had one church per 60 residents.

== Economy ==
Union Pacific operates the Settegast Yard, an intermodal terminal.

== Government and infrastructure ==
Settegast is in Houston City Council District B.

Harris Health System (formerly Harris County Hospital District) operates the Settegast Health Center. The center opened on January 28, 1967. The designated public hospital is Lyndon B. Johnson Hospital in Northeast Houston.

The county commissioner who represents Settegast is Rodney Ellis, Precinct One Commissioner, while Jerry Davis serves as Settegast's council member, District B. Settegast is also a Super Neighborhood and has merged with East Houston, Super Neighborhood #49.

Settegast is under Texas House 142, and is represented by Harold V. Dutton Jr., a native of Fifth Ward.

Sherman Eagleton is the constable for Settegast (Precinct 3).

== Education ==
The area is within the Houston Independent School District. Residents are zoned to Bennie Carl Elmore Elementary School, Key Middle School, and Kashmere High School.

Elmore Elementary School has 39 teachers with an average of four years' experience, and the school has all four performance index indicators with one distinction designator, "Top 25% Student Progress".

Key Middle School has 45 teachers with an average of three years' experience, and the school has three out of four performance index indicators with no distinction designators.

Kashmere High School has 39 teachers with an average of nine years' service, and the school has two out of four performance index indicators with no distinction designators.

=== History of education ===
Prior to July 1, 2013, the North Forest Independent School District (originally Northeast Houston Independent School District) served the community.

When Northeast Houston ISD was segregated, Settegast had its own high school. A grade 1-8 school called Settegast High School opened in 1951 to serve black students. It had a student body of 300. B.C. Elmore High School opened in 1957. After Elmore High's opening, Settegast School and Hilliard School served as the community grade schools. Elmore High was converted into a junior high school on when Forest Brook High School opened in 1972. The building was razed and replaced with a new middle school structure in 1999.

The new Elmore Middle School building opened in 2000. The 40 classroom, 130,000 square feet (12,000 m^{2}) facility had a multi-million dollar cost.

As of 2010, as an NFISD territory, Settegast was zoned to Hilliard Elementary School, B. C. Elmore Middle School, and North Forest High School. The Elmore campus joined HISD and was converted into an elementary school during the merger of North Forest ISD into HISD on July 1, 2013.

== Parks and recreation ==
The City of Houston operates the Settegast Park. The Northeast Family YMCA serves residents of Settegast. The former Lakewood Church is in the northeast portion of Settegast. It was established in a converted feed store. On July 16, 2005, the church moved into the former Houston Summit.

== Environmental violations ==
According to the EPA's ECHO in 2018, McCarty Road Landfill Gas Recovery Facility (located on 9416 Ley, Houston, TX 77078) has a compliance status of "high-priority violation", owing $27,282 in penalties.

Similarly, EPA's ECHO found the Queen Ready Mix (located on 8702 Liberty Rd, Houston, TX 77028) has a compliance status of "significant noncompliance".

Also, EPA'S ECHO found Magellan East Houston Terminal (located on 7901 Wallisville Rd, Houston, TX 77029) has a compliance status of "significant noncompliance". Magellan has shown positive growth in VOC emissions, measured in pounds per year (2008–65,829; 2011–138,238.40; 2014–167,801.20).

== See also ==
- History of the African-Americans in Houston
