= Sam Rayburn High School =

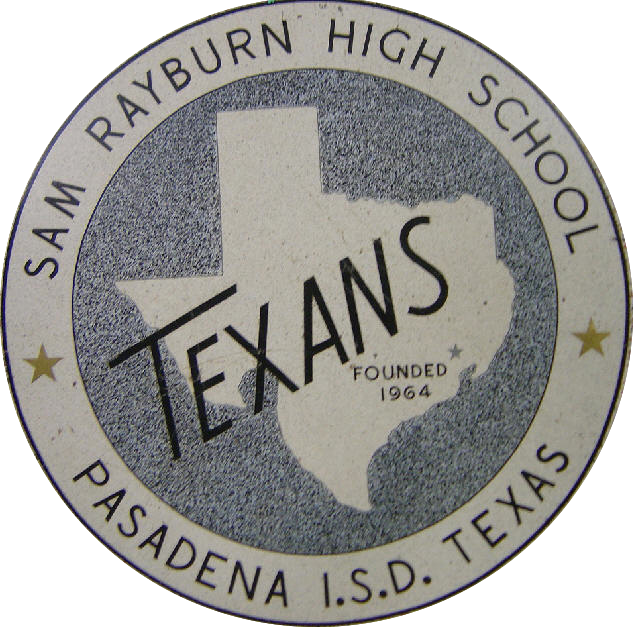
- Logo SRHS

Location
- 2121 Cherrybrook Ln. Pasadena, Texas, 77502; United States; 29.67848°N 95.1824°W

Information
- Type: Public
- Motto: "Stay true to the blue."
- Established: 1964
- School district: Pasadena Independent School District
- Principal: Katherine Rearick
- Teaching staff: 185.57 (FTE)
- Grades: 9-12
- Enrollment: 2,681 (2018-19)
- Student to teacher ratio: 14.45
- Colors: Navy, Columbia blue, and white
- Nickname: Texans
- Yearbook: The Statesman
- Website: rayburn.pasadenaisd.org
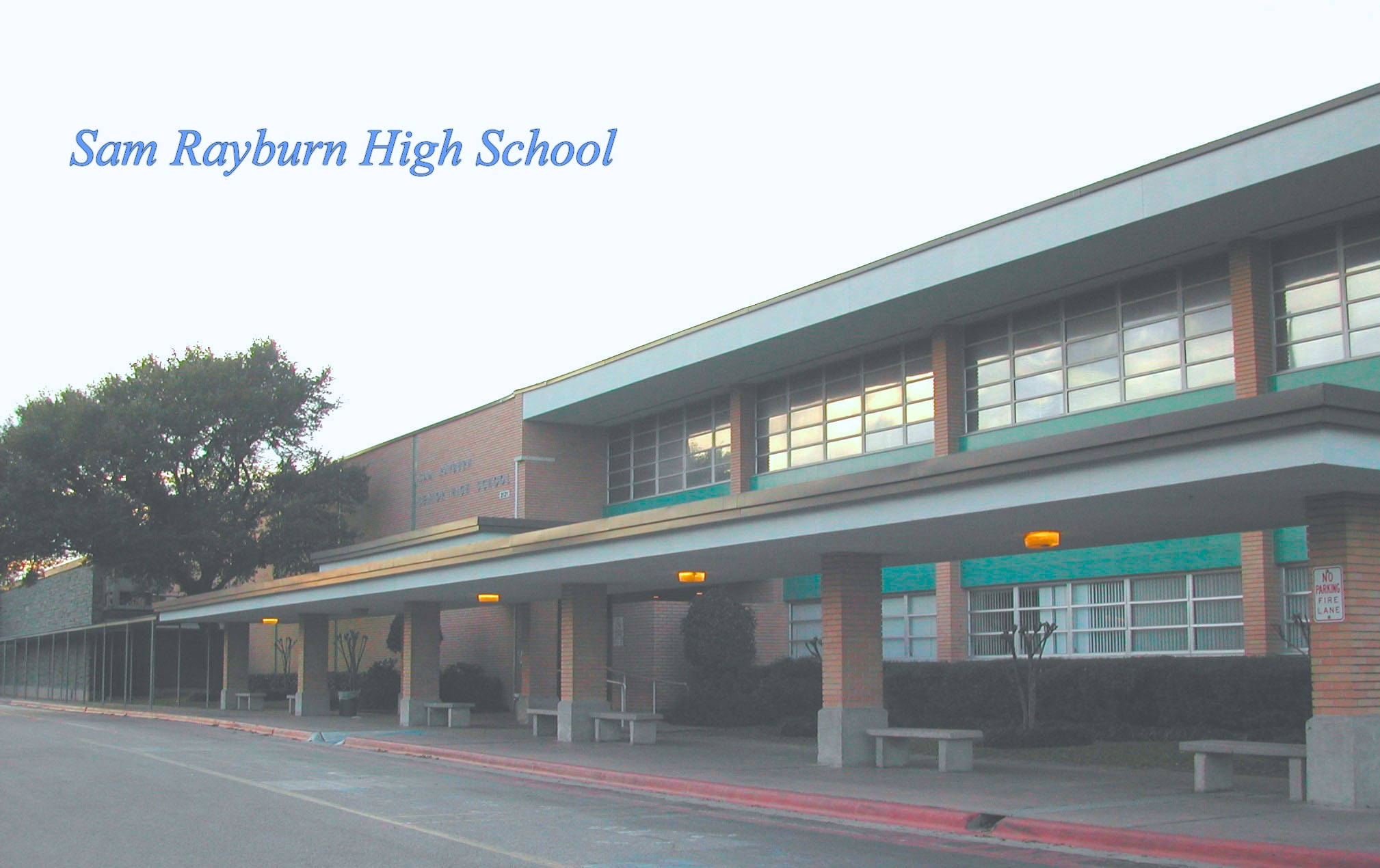
- Sam Rayburn High School Pasadena, Texas

Sam Rayburn High School is a public high school located in Pasadena, Texas in the United States. The school is a part of the Pasadena Independent School District.

== History ==
The school opened in 1964 and was expanded and renovated in the early 2000s. It is named after Samuel Taliaferro Rayburn, a Texas native and member of Texas House of Representatives and the Speaker of the United States House of Representatives who served for 17 years. When Rayburn opened, its principal was Carter Lomax. Its first Head Coach for football was James O'Neil. In 2011 voters in PISD approved of a bond, which includes building a new competitive gymnasium for Rayburn, set to open in September 2013.

== Mascot ==
Sam Rayburn's mascot is the Texan. Some Rayburnites eventually adopted Yosemite Sam from Warner Brothers Looney Tunes as the school's informal mascot. In 2007 PISD received warnings that if it didn't discontinue the use of Yosemite Sam as Sam Rayburn's mascot, the interested party would file copyright infringement charges in a court of law. PISD then forced Sam Rayburn to change its mascot. Yosemite Sam had been Rayburn's mascot for over 43 years.

== Athletics ==
With American football being the primary sport for domestic attention in the school, the other sports at Sam Rayburn have seen great success, with baseball being the only sport so far to win a UIL state championship. Most recently, in 2014 the boys soccer program earned Rayburn their first district title in at least a decade. In 2012, the school was warned by the National Football League to halt usage of the Texan logo for all sports teams, as well as for the school to advertise. The school has since mostly complied by changing all logos to a unique design emphasizing the school name and nickname. Sam Rayburn is classified as 6A for UIL sports, as the student population is expected to eclipse 3,000 for the 2014–15 school year. Texans sports include:

=== Boys ===
- Aquatics (swimming, diving, open water)
- Baseball
- Basketball
- Cross Country
- Football
- Golf
- Soccer
- Tennis
- Track & Field

==== Girls ====
- Aquatics (swimming, diving, open water)
- Basketball
- Cross Country
- Golf
- Soccer
- Softball
- Tennis
- Track & Field
- Volleyball

Other squads Rayburn is known for include their cheerleading team, and drill team, called the Tex-Anns. Both squads have earned national honors in recent years.

== Extracurricular activities ==
Sam Rayburn hosted Texas French Symposium in 2013.

== Rivals ==
The school's principal rival is Pasadena High School. The Sam Rayburn vs. PHS rivalry has been going on since Sam Rayburn became the second high school in Pasadena (3rd in Pasadena ISD) in the early 1960s. It is a tradition every year at Sam Rayburn to try to beat PHS. They play Pasadena the last game of the football season for the Pride Bowl and have an annual "Burn Baldy" bonfire the night before the game. Rayburn first defeated the Pasadena HS varsity football team in 1968 (34-7). Sam Rayburn was the champion in 2012, their 6th consecutive year as Pride Bowl champs. One of Rayburn's secondary rivals is Pasadena Memorial High School. PMHS opened in 2003, taking away much of the enrollment from Rayburn and South Houston High School. Another secondary rival has long been with Deer Park High School since their respected zonings have long bordered each other, leading to increased competition in sports over the years. Since Fall 2012, however, Rayburn and the rest of the PISD schools have been separated from Deer Park in district athletics.

== Feeder schools ==
Middle schools

- Bobby Shaw
- Marshall Kendrick
- Keller

Intermediate schools

- San Jacinto
- Southmore
- Parkview

Elementary schools

- Sparks
- Mae Smythe
- Golden Acres
- Fisher
- Bailey
- Parks
- McMasters

== Notable alumni ==
- Kathy (Wernly) Clark - American bestselling author
- Mike McKinney - 13th chancellor of The Texas A&M University System
