= South Houston High School =

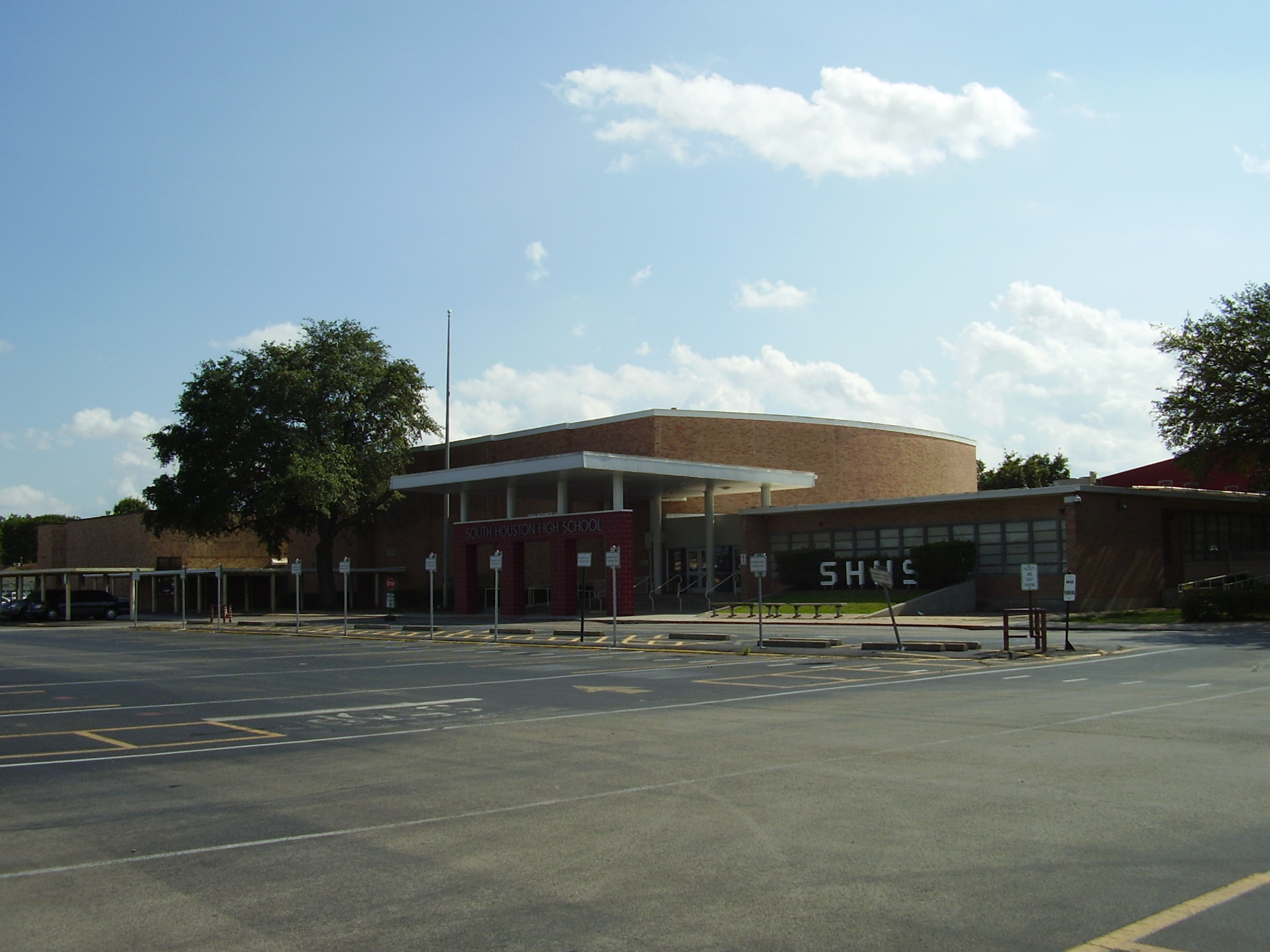

Location
- 3820 Shaver St. South Houston, Texas 77587; United States
- Coordinates: 29.65206°N 95.20983°W

Information
- Type: Public
- Motto: "Do what’s right, Go Trojans!"
- Established: 1957
- School district: Pasadena Independent School District
- Principal: Jennifer Stewart
- Teaching staff: 159.63 (FTE)
- Grades: 9-12
- Enrollment: 2,369 (2018-19)
- Student to teacher ratio: 14.84
- Colors: Scarlet and gray
- Mascot: Hector the Trojan
- Nickname: Trojans
- Newspaper: The Torch
- Yearbook: The Palladium
- Website: southhoustonhs.pasadenaisd.org

South Houston High School is a public high school located in South Houston, Texas in the United States. The school is a part of the Pasadena Independent School District.

== History ==
South Houston High School opened in 1957 to relieve Pasadena High School and graduated its first class in 1959. At that time the city of South Houston had a population of approximately 7500 citizens. During the school's early years, the mayor of South Houston was George Christy, who was the owner of a circus. His elephants were used to build part of Spencer Highway. Sam Rayburn High School was later opened to relieve crowding at SHHS.

In 2013, South Houston High School was one of only two high schools in the Pasadena Independent School District to be awarded a "Distinction" rating by being in the top quartile for student progress, and was ranked 1st for this measure in their cohort group. In 2014 SHHS was awarded three Distinctions, more than any other high school in the district, one each for Mathematics, Science and Student Progress and was 3rd for the Student Progress measure in their cohort group. In 2015 SHHS was awarded two Distinctions, one for Science and the other for Student Progress.

== Today ==
Beginning in August 2016, SHHS began offering an opportunity for students to participate in an exclusive educational program called Connect. Student are selected by application for this.

SHHS opened its Early College High School Program in fall 2017.

The city of South Houston has approximately 17,400 citizens with a median household income of more than $14,000 below the state average.

== Wall and Halls of Honor ==
In March 2011, South Houston High School unveiled the "Wall of Honor" to spotlight outstanding alumni who have made contributions to the community, nation and world. 54 alumni were honored, including five who gave the ultimate sacrifice in the U.S. Armed Services in Vietnam, Iraq and Afghanistan. Each year the school adds names to the wall.

On October 1, 2013, South Houston High School unveiled their Teacher Hall of Honor with an inaugural group of 20 former SHHS teachers, including James Barber, who served as the school's principal for 10 years; Janet Barnett Reed, who taught at the school for 41 years; and Sally Schott, long-time choir director. The Teacher Wall of Honor was unveiled as part of the Homecoming celebration. Each year during the Homecoming celebration the school hosts an open house for alumni and inducts new members to the Walls of Honor.

=== Notable alumni ===
- Cheryl Bolen (1964): author of historical novels, was inducted to the Wall of Honor in 2011.
- Al Carter (1970): sports journalist and editor; former columnist for the Houston Chronicle, Houston Post and The Dallas Morning News.
- Nathan Isgur (1964): theoretical physicist; winner of Sakurai Prize in Physics; chief scientist of Jefferson Physics Lab. Inducted to the Wall of Honor in 2011.
- Don McIlhenny (1951): former National Football League halfback for the Green Bay Packers and the Dallas Cowboys
- Chris Tremie (1988): former Major League catcher with the Chicago White Sox, Texas Rangers, Pittsburgh Pirates and Houston Astros. Inducted to the Wall of Honor in 2011.

== Sports ==
South Houston High School competes in football, soccer, basketball, volleyball, softball, dance (Jannettes), baseball, track and field, cross country, cheerleading, golf, marching band, tennis, powerlifting, bowling and swimming. The school has a Navy NJROTC unit which was named the best in their region in spring 2014.

== Mascot, colors, and publications ==
The mascot for South Houston High School is Hector the Trojan. The school colors are normally referred to as red and white, but the official colors are scarlet and gray. The yearbook is called the Palladium. The student newspaper was originally called The Forum; it is now called, "The Torch."

== Feeder patterns ==
Elementary schools that feed into South Houston include:

- Fisher
- Freeman
- Garfield
- Jensen
- Jessup
- Walter Matthys
- Pearl Hall
- L.F. Smith
- South Houston
- Williams
- Young

Intermediate schools that feed into South Houston include Miller, Park View, Queens and South Houston.

Portions of the SHHS attendance boundary are served by Rick Schneider Middle School.
