= Pasadena School District =

Pasadena School District may refer to:

- Pasadena Unified School District (California)
- Pasadena Independent School District (Texas)
