= Kathy Clark =

American novelist

Kathy (Wernly) Clark is an American bestselling author of contemporary romance novels that encompass the young adult mystery, new adult romantic suspense, erotic romance and contemporary romance genres. She has also published works under the pen names of Kris Cassidy and Bob Kat (Co-written with her husband, Bob Wernly).

== Biography ==
Kathy Clark was born in Houston, Texas, grew up in Alvin, Texas and graduated from Sam Rayburn High School in Pasadena, Texas. She sold her first book to Dell for their Candlelight Ecstasy romance line in 1983. In 1989 she sold Sweet Anticipation to Harlequin American which began a long association with Harlequin editor Tahti Carter. Clark's 23 women's fiction (romance) novels have sold over three million copies in more than ten languages and have been on the New York Times' bestsellers' list and won numerous awards.

In 2015, she graduated summa cum laude from York College of Pennsylvania with a BA in Mass Communications and Fine Arts with a perfect 4.0 GPA. She then worked as an adjunct professor at York College and taught an upper-level media writing class.

In 2012, she teamed up with her husband Bob Wernly to write a young adult time travel mystery/romance series called Time Shifters under the pen name of Bob Kat.

Beginning in 2013, Clark began co-writing all of her books with Wernly. They have self-published three books in their new adult series Scandals under the name Kathy Clark. In 2015, their Denver Heroes series was published by Random House, followed in 2016 with their Austin Heroes series.

== Bibliography ==
=== Dell Candlelight Ecstasy Romances ===
- 1985 Another Sunny Day
- 1985 A Private Affair
- 1985 Golden Days
- 1986 A Hint of Splendor (reissued as Starry Nights)
- 1986 Passion and Possession
- 1987 Destiny's Lady (reissued as Tempting Fate)
- 1987 Carousel of Love (reissued as Risky Business)

=== Harlequin American Romances ===
- 1988 Sweet Anticipation
- 1989 Kissed by an Angel
- 1990 Sight Unseen
- 1990 Phantom Angel
- 1990 Angel of Mercy
- 1991 Starting Over
- 1992 Good Morning, Miss Greene
- 1992 Cody's Last Stand
- 1992 Count Your Blessings
- 1993 Goodbye Desperado
- 1994 Groom Unknown (reissued as Cold Feet, Warm Heart)
- 1995 Stroke of Midnight

=== Harlequin Superromance ===
- 1993 Hearts Against the Wind (Crystal Creek Series)
- 1993 Stand by Your Man (Crystal Creek Series)

=== Crown Pageant Romances ===
- 1989 No Satisfaction (as Kris Cassidy)

=== Originally Kismet Romances ===
- 1990 Born to be Wild

=== Audio Entertainment Romances ===
- 1993 Whisper Sweet Nothings (with Margie Hansen)
- 1993 A Man For Molly (with Margie Hansen)

=== As Kathy Clark ===
- 2012 Life's What Happens
- 2012 After Midnight Book No. 1 of Denver Heroes Romantic Suspense Series
- 2013 Cries in the Night Book No. 2 of Denver Heroes Romantic Suspense Series
- 2013 Due Dates Book No. 1 of the New Adult Romantic Suspense series, Scandals
- 2014 Killer Date Book No. 2 of the New Adult Romantic Suspense series, Scandals
- 2015 After Midnight Book No. 1 of Denver Heroes Romantic Suspense Series Published by Random House
- 2015 Cries in the Night Book No. 2 of Denver Heroes Romantic Suspense Series Published by Random House
- 2015 Worst Date Ever Book No. 3 of the New Adult Romantic Suspense series, Scandals
- 2015 Deep Night Book No. 3 of Denver Heroes Romantic Suspense Series Published by Random House
- 2015 Fantasy Suite Book No. 1 of Erotic Romance Room Service Series Published by Loose Id
- 2016 After Love Book No. 1 of Austin Heroes Romantic Suspense Series Published by Random House
- 2016 Master Suite Book No. 2 of Erotic Romance Room Service Series
- 2016 Almost Forever Book No. 2 of Austin Heroes Romantic Suspense Series Published by Random House

=== Time Shifters Series ===
1. 2012 Change The Past (as Bob Kat)
2. 2013 Day at the Beach (as Bob Kat)
3. 2013 Runaway Lover (as Bob Kat)
4. 2014 Forever Love Book No. 4 (as Bob Kat)
5. 2016 Not My Life (as Bob Kat)

== Awards ==
- 1991 Romance Writers of America Emma Merritt Service Award
- 1991 Romantic Times Reviewer's Choice Award for Angel of Mercy
- 2014 Colorado Humanities Colorado Book Award Finalists for Cries in the Night
