= South Houston, Texas =

- City
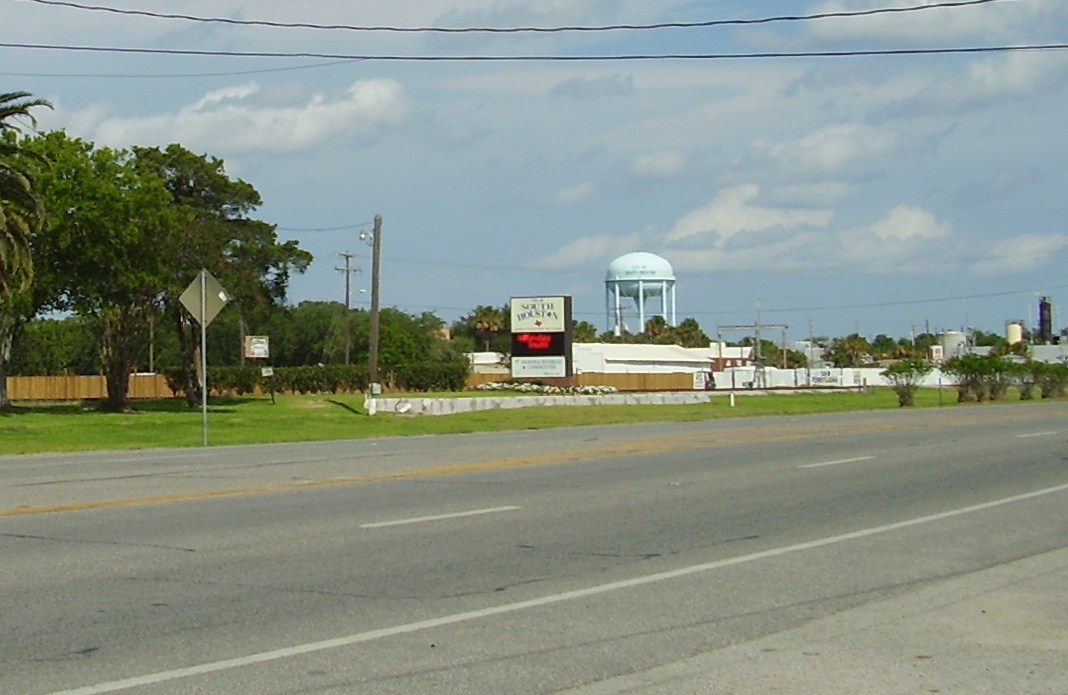
- Marker for the city of South Houston

- Location in Harris County and the state of Texas
- Coordinates: 29°39′40″N 95°13′47″W
- Country: United States
- State: Texas
- County: Harris

Government
  - Type: Council-Manager
  - City Council: Mayor Joe Soto; Mary Castillo; Willie Rios; Cynthia Piña; Mauro Barrera; Louis Martinez
  - City Secretary: Lance Avant

Area
  - Total: 3.05 sq mi (7.89 km^{2})
  - Land: 3.05 sq mi (7.89 km^{2})
  - Water: 0 sq mi (0.00 km^{2})
- Elevation: 30 ft (9 m)

Population (2020)
  - Total: 16,153
  - Density: 5,724/sq mi (2,210.2/km^{2})
- Time zone: UTC-6 (Central (CST))
  - Summer (DST): UTC-5 (CDT)
- ZIP code: 77587
- Area codes: 713, 281, 832, 346, 621
- FIPS code: 48-69020
- GNIS feature ID: 1347476
- Website: www.southhoustontx.gov

South Houston is a city in the U.S. state of Texas, within the Houston–Pasadena–The Woodlands metropolitan area and Harris County. The population was 16,153 at the 2020 census. It is bordered by the cities of Houston and Pasadena, and geographically located southeast of Houston.

== History ==
C.S. Woods of the Western Land Company founded the settlement of Dumont in 1907. A post office appeared in 1910. In 1913 Dumont was incorporated as the city of South Houston. Because of the 1913 incorporation, Houston did not incorporate South Houston's territory into its city limits, while Houston annexed surrounding areas that were unincorporated. South Houston's initial industrial activity consisted of shipping produce along the Galveston, Houston and Henderson Railroad. The hurricane of 1915 destroyed many of the local industries. The establishment of the Houston Ship Channel resulted in the establishment of manufacturing industries inland, including in South Houston. Between the 1940s and the early 1960s South Houston found rapid population growth. The city had 7,523 inhabitants in 1960. In 1980, South Houston had 11,782 inhabitants and 303 businesses. In 1990, 14,207 inhabitants lived in South Houston.

Legend has it, elephants belonging to former South Houston mayor George Christy, a circus owner, assisted the construction of the Spencer Highway.

From the 1980 census to the 1990 census, Hispanics began to move into South Houston by an amount between 1,000 and 3,500 per square mile. Most Hispanics in South Houston were of Mexican descent.

== Geography ==
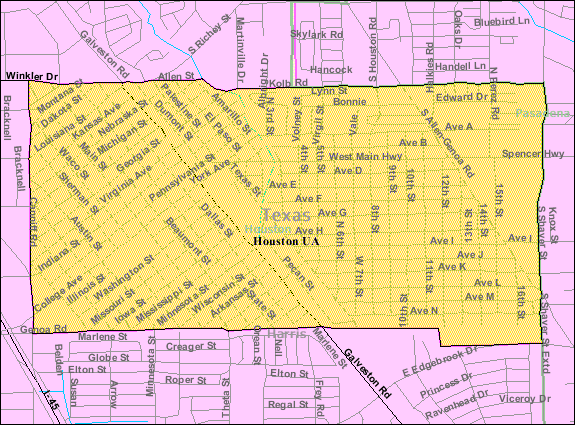
Map of South Houston

South Houston is located at 29°39′40″N 95°13′47″W (29.660980, –95.229787).

According to the United States Census Bureau, the city has a total area of 7.8 km^{2}, all land.

== Demographics ==
Historical population
Census	Pop.	Note	%±
1930	612		—
1940	982		60.5%
1950	4,126		320.2%
1960	7,532		82.5%
1970	11,527		53.0%
1980	13,293		15.3%
1990	14,207		6.9%
2000	15,833		11.4%
2010	16,983		7.3%
2020	16,153		−4.9%
U.S. Decennial Census

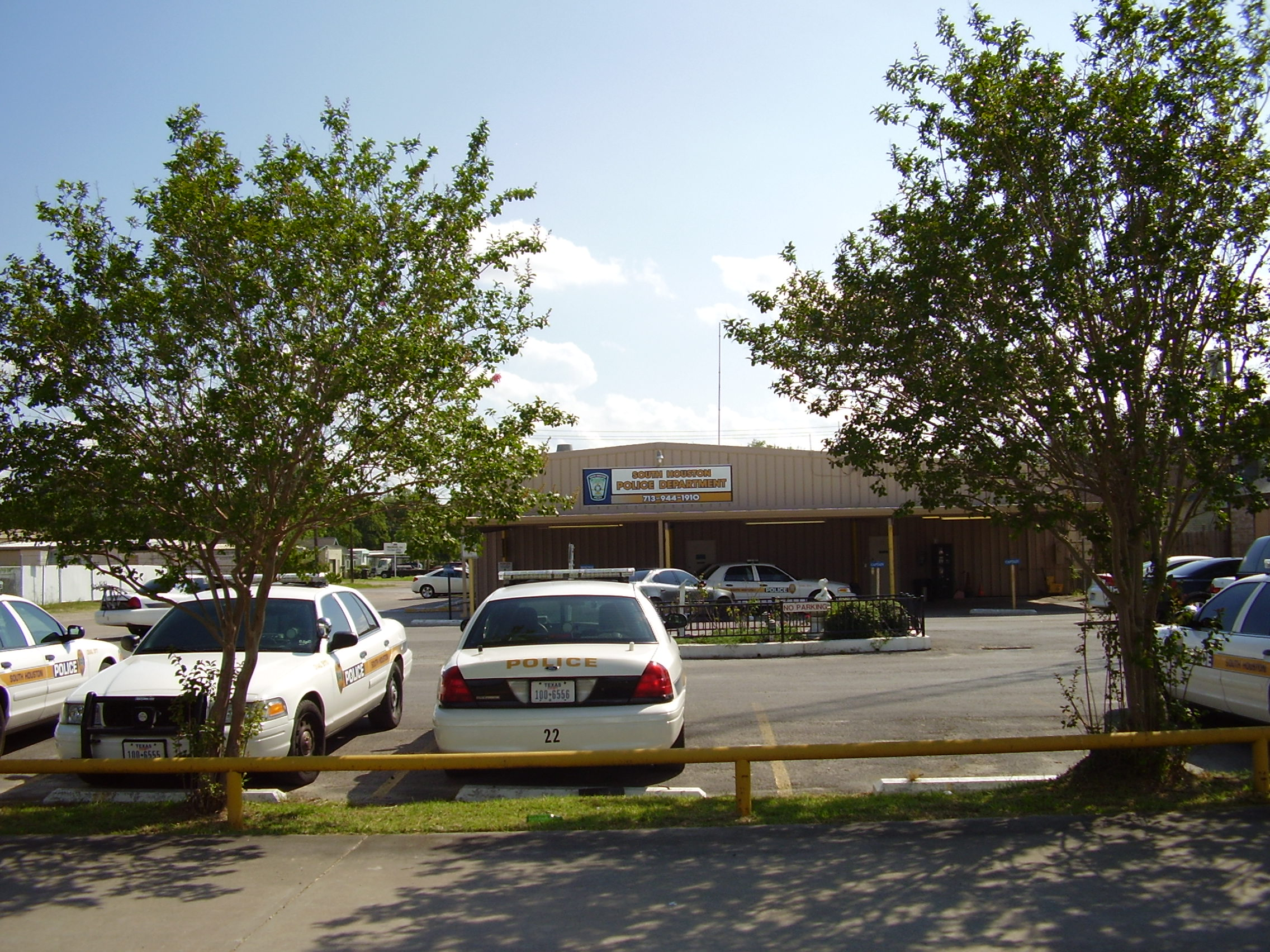
South Houston police station/Robert A. Anderson Police Administration Building (rear entrance)

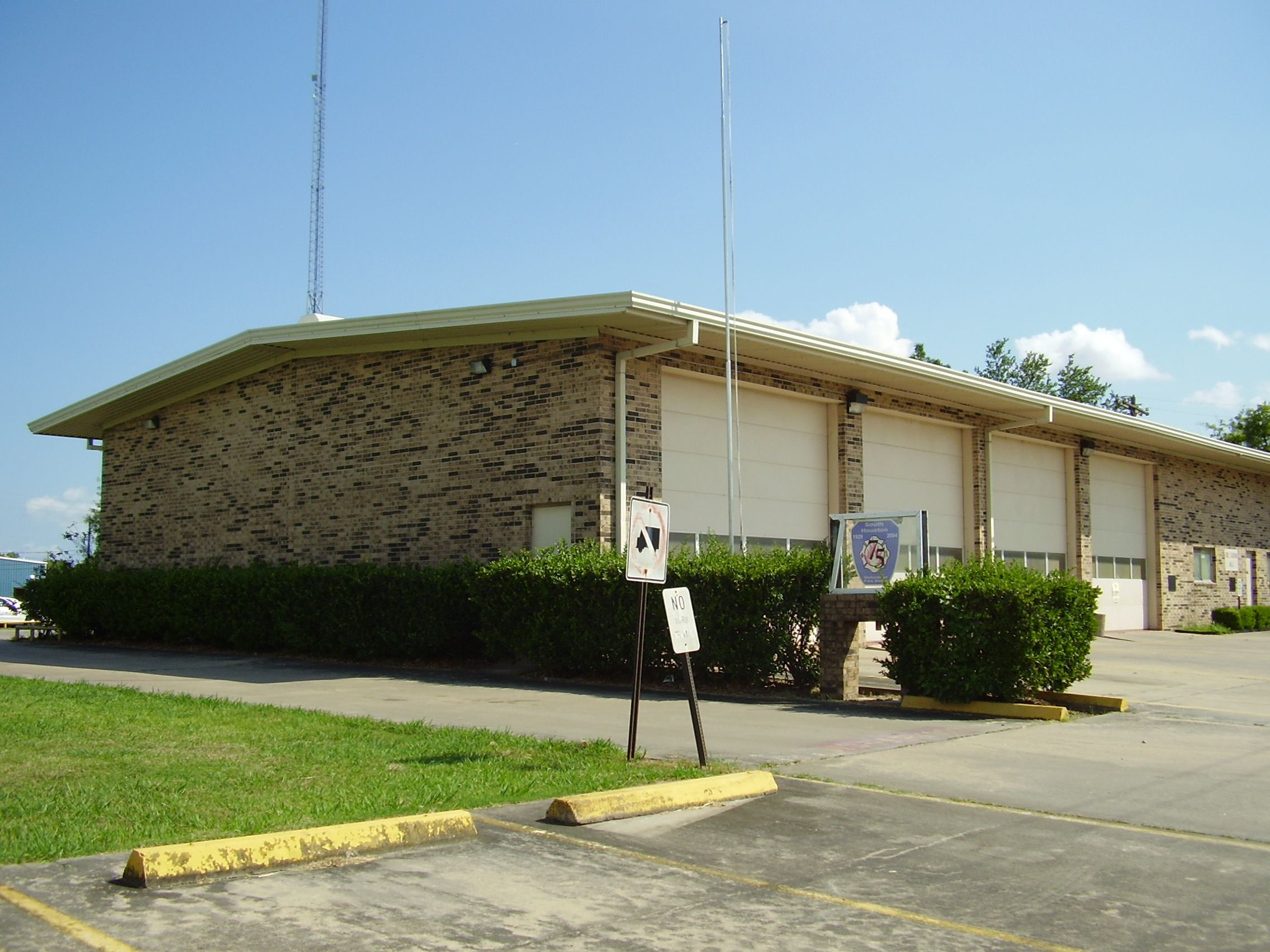
South Houston fire station

=== Racial and ethnic composition ===
South Houston city, Texas – Racial and ethnic composition Note: the US Census treats Hispanic/Latino as an ethnic category. This table excludes Latinos from the racial categories and assigns them to a separate category. Hispanics/Latinos may be of any race.
Race / Ethnicity (NH = Non-Hispanic)	Pop 2000	Pop 2010	Pop 2020	% 2000	% 2010	% 2020
White alone (NH)	3,103	1,682	1,128	19.60%	9.90%	6.98%
Black or African American alone (NH)	139	181	330	0.88%	1.07%	2.04%
Native American or Alaska Native alone (NH)	37	22	18	0.23%	0.13%	0.11%
Asian alone (NH)	97	79	99	0.61%	0.47%	0.61%
Native Hawaiian or Pacific Islander alone (NH)	4	0	2	0.03%	0.00%	0.01%
Other race alone (NH)	4	13	32	0.03%	0.08%	0.20%
Mixed race or Multiracial (NH)	111	52	93	0.70%	0.31%	0.58%
Hispanic or Latino (any race)	12,338	14,954	14,451	77.93%	88.05%	89.46%
Total	15,833	16,983	16,153	100.00%	100.00%	100.00%

=== 2020 census ===
As of the 2020 census, there were 16,153 people, 4,906 households, and 4,107 families residing in the city. The median age was 31.9 years, with 29.0% of residents under the age of 18 and 10.9% aged 65 or older. For every 100 females there were 100.4 males, and for every 100 females age 18 and over there were 100.2 males age 18 and over.

Among the 4,906 households, 46.5% had children under the age of 18 living in them, 47.2% were married-couple households, 19.6% were households with a male householder and no spouse or partner present, and 26.8% were households with a female householder and no spouse or partner present. About 16.9% of all households were made up of individuals, and 6.3% had someone living alone who was 65 years of age or older.

100.0% of residents lived in urban areas, while 0.0% lived in rural areas.

There were 5,315 housing units, of which 7.7% were vacant. The homeowner vacancy rate was 0.8% and the rental vacancy rate was 7.3%.

The 2020 census reported the following racial breakdown for the city.

Racial composition as of the 2020 census
Race	Number	Percent
White	5,197	32.2%
Black or African American	380	2.4%
American Indian and Alaska Native	226	1.4%
Asian	108	0.7%
Native Hawaiian and Other Pacific Islander	3	0.0%
Some other race	5,661	35.0%
Two or more races	4,578	28.3%
Hispanic or Latino (of any race)	14,451	89.5%

=== 2010 census ===
As of the census of 2010, there were 16,983 people from 4,617 households residing in the city. The racial makeup of the city was 1.1% White, 1.2% African American, 0.80% Native American, 0.70% Asian, 0.00% Pacific Islander, 1.74% from other races, and 2.6% from two or more races. Hispanic or Latino of any race were 89.4% of the population.

There were 4,593 households, out of which 47.7% had children under the age of 18 living with them, 60.1% were married couples living together, 13.9% had a female householder with no husband present, and 19.5% were non-families. 15.4% of all households were made up of individuals, and 5.4% had someone living alone who was 65 years of age or older. The average household size was 3.45 and the average family size was 3.86.

In the city, the population was spread out, with 34.1% under the age of 18, 11.7% from 18 to 24, 30.8% from 25 to 44, 16.5% from 45 to 64, and 6.8% who were 65 years of age or older. The median age was 28 years. For every 100 females, there were 104.1 males. For every 100 females age 18 and over, there were 103.6 males.

The median income for a household in the city was $44,607 [in 2017 dollars]. The per capita income for the city was $15,611. About 24% of the population was below the poverty line, including 25.8% of those under age 18 and 10.5% of those age 65 or over.

== Government and infrastructure ==
=== Local government ===
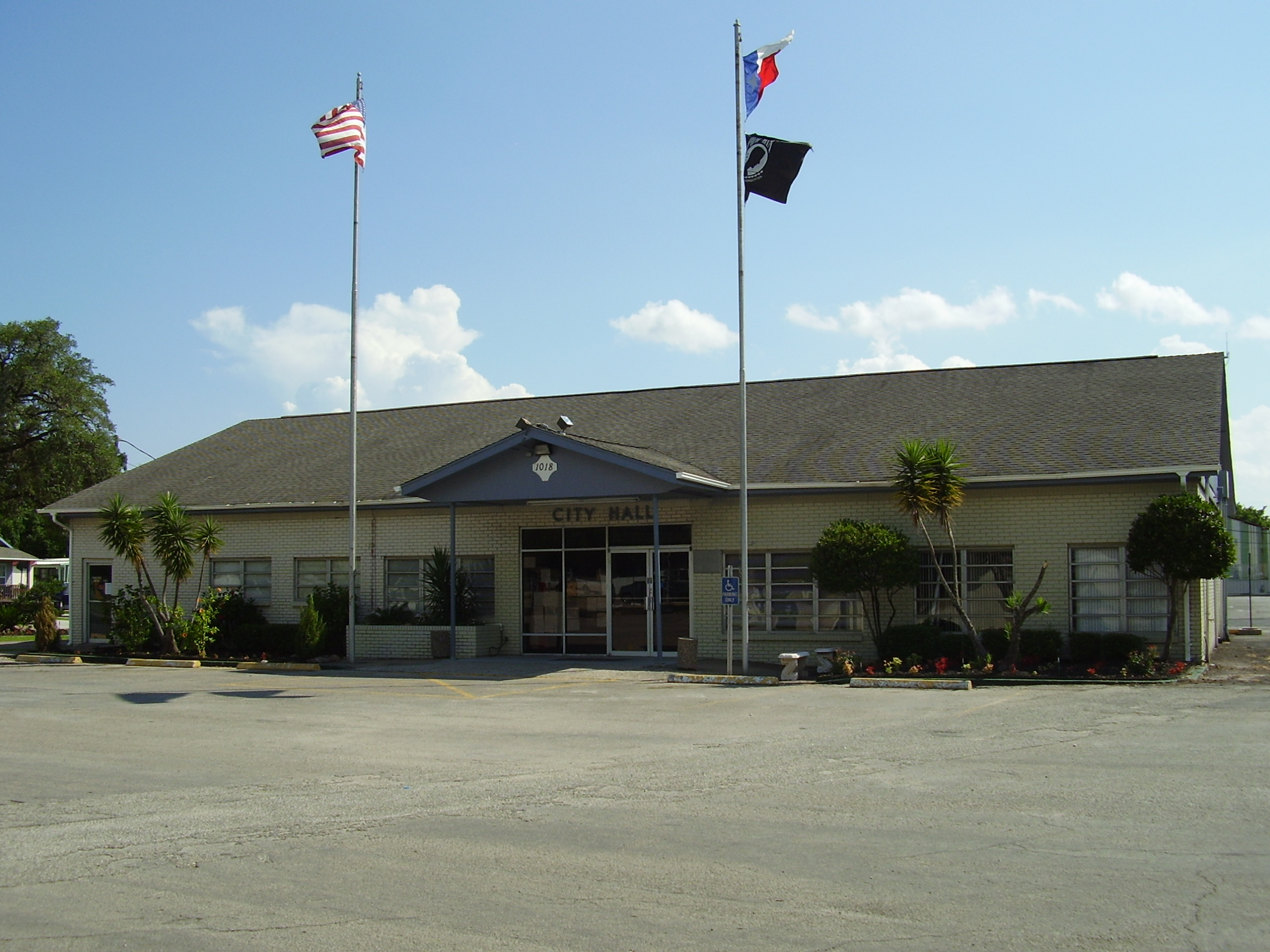
South Houston City Hall

The South Houston City Council establishes city policies, considering resolutions and ordinances, appointing South Houston residents to positions on municipal committees and boards, and establishing the annual budgets. City council meets during the first and third Tuesdays of each month in the South Houston Municipal Court; meetings begin at 7:30 PM; it is open to members of the public. As of 2024 the mayor is Joe Soto. The council members are Mary Castillo, Willie Rios, Cynthia Piña, Mauro Barrera, and Louis Martinez.

The South Houston Fire Department serves the city. The South Houston Police Department is headquartered at 1101 West Dallas Street. As of 2008 Herbert Gilbert is the chief of police.

=== County, state, and federal representation ===
South Houston is located within Harris County Commissioner Precinct 2; as of 2019, Adrian Garcia heads Precinct 2.

South Houston is located in District 145 of the Texas House of Representatives. As of 2019, Christina Morales represents the district. South Houston is within District 6 of the Texas Senate; as of 2018 Carol Alvarado is the representative.

South Houston is within Texas's 29th congressional district; as of 2019. Sylvia Garcia is the representative. The United States Postal Service operates the South Houston Post Office at 315 North Allen Genoa Road.

The nearest public health center of the Harris Health System (formerly Harris County Health System) is Strawberry Health Clinic in Pasadena. The nearest public hospital is Ben Taub General Hospital in the Texas Medical Center, Houston.

== Economy ==
The Lewis Food Town grocery store chain is based in South Houston.

In 2006 H-E-B opened the "Mi Tienda" ("My Store") Hispanic-themed store in South Houston. As of 2007 all of its employees spoke Spanish.

== Education ==
=== Primary and secondary schools ===
==== Public schools ====
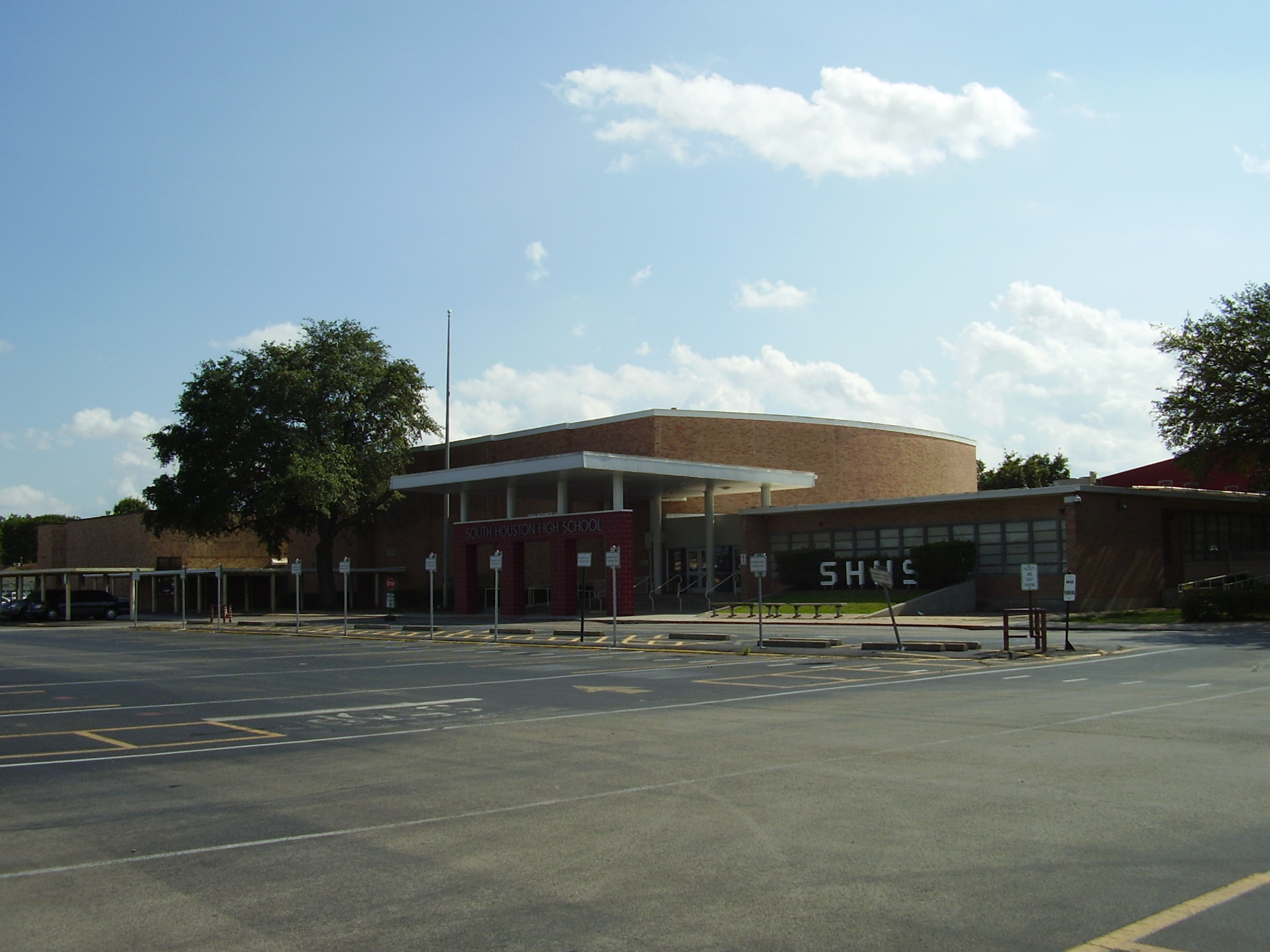
South Houston High School

South Houston is served by the Pasadena Independent School District.

The following elementary schools serve sections of South Houston:

- Pearl Hall Elementary School (South Houston)
- Walter Matthys Elementary School (South Houston)
  - It opened in August 1992. As of 1998 it had 775 students.
- L.F. Smith Elementary School (South Houston)
- South Houston Elementary School (South Houston)

As of 2000 South Houston Elementary had computers and computer equipment in all of its classrooms as well as a broadcasting studio operated by students. In the period 1999–2000 South Houston Elementary, despite the low socio-economic backgrounds of its students, received "recognized" scores from the Texas Education Agency.

Sections of South Houston west of Old Galveston Road are served by Rick Schneider Middle School (Houston, Grades 5–6). Parts of South Houston are zoned to Carter Lomax Middle School (Pasadena, Grades 5–6). Parts of South Houston are not served by any "middle school" and instead are served by elementary schools, intermediate schools, and high schools.

Sections of South Houston west of Old Galveston Road are served by South Houston Intermediate School (South Houston, Grades 7–8). Parts east of Old Galveston Road are served by Queens Intermediate School (Pasadena, Grades 6–8). South Houston Intermediate opened on property acquired by PISD in 1947; it previously housed the Asgard College for Girls, a prison for delinquent boys, a psychiatric hospital, a transit house for the federal government, and a National Youth Association Camp.

All of South Houston is served by South Houston High School.

=== Public libraries ===
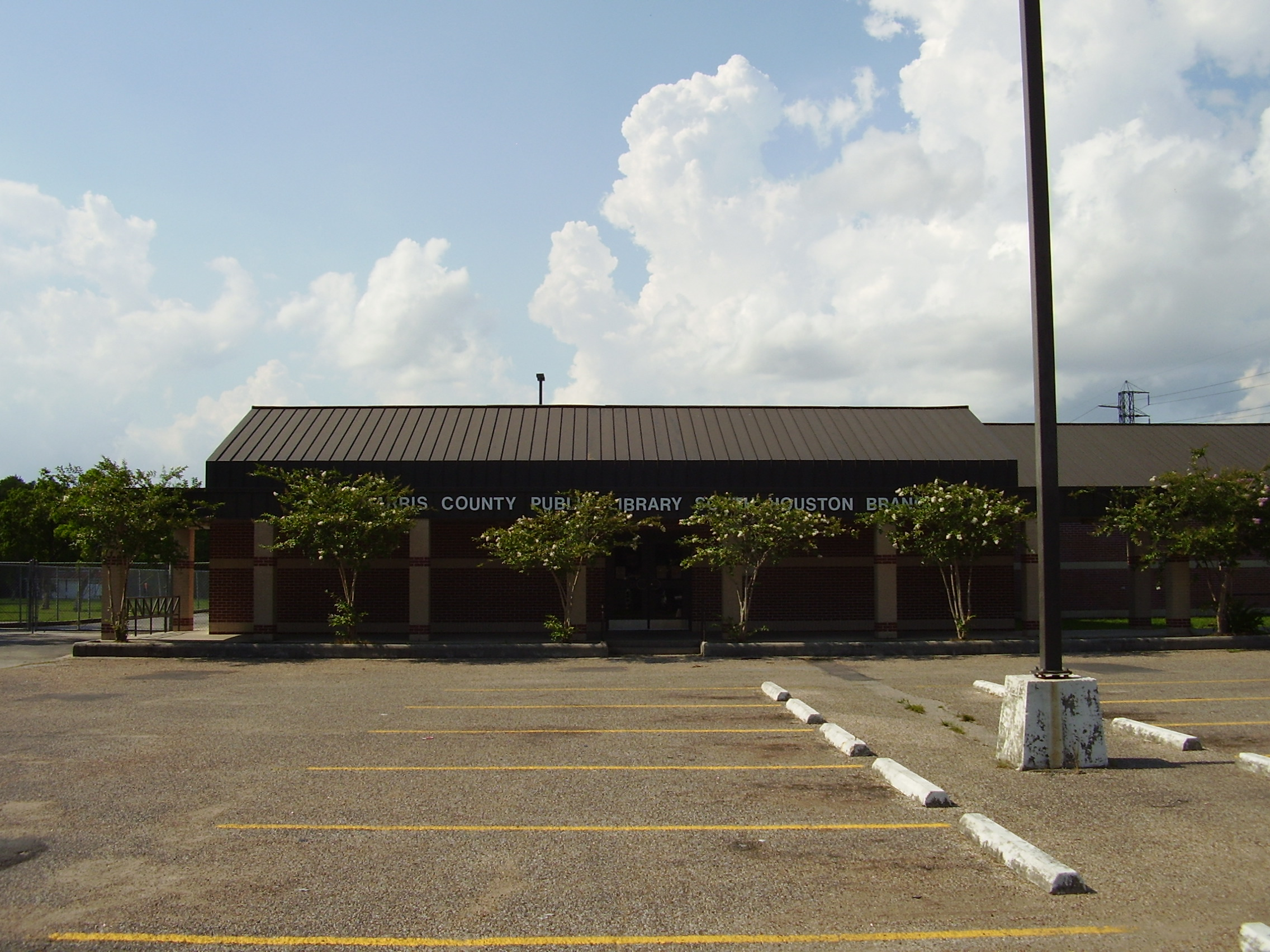
South Houston Library

South Houston is served by the South Houston Branch of Harris County Public Library at 607 Avenue A. The first South Houston library opened in 1927. In 1937 money was raised to build a structure to house the library; this structure stands in a park next to the current library. In the 1950s the library moved into a building with a welfare office and a clinic. In 1967 the city purchased land and a barracks building from Ellington Field; the city then moved the library there, where it remained until 1991. The current 5,800 square feet (540 m^{2}) branch opened in May 1991.

=== Colleges and universities ===
Residents of Pasadena ISD (and therefore South Houston) are zoned to San Jacinto College.

=== Gallery of schools ===
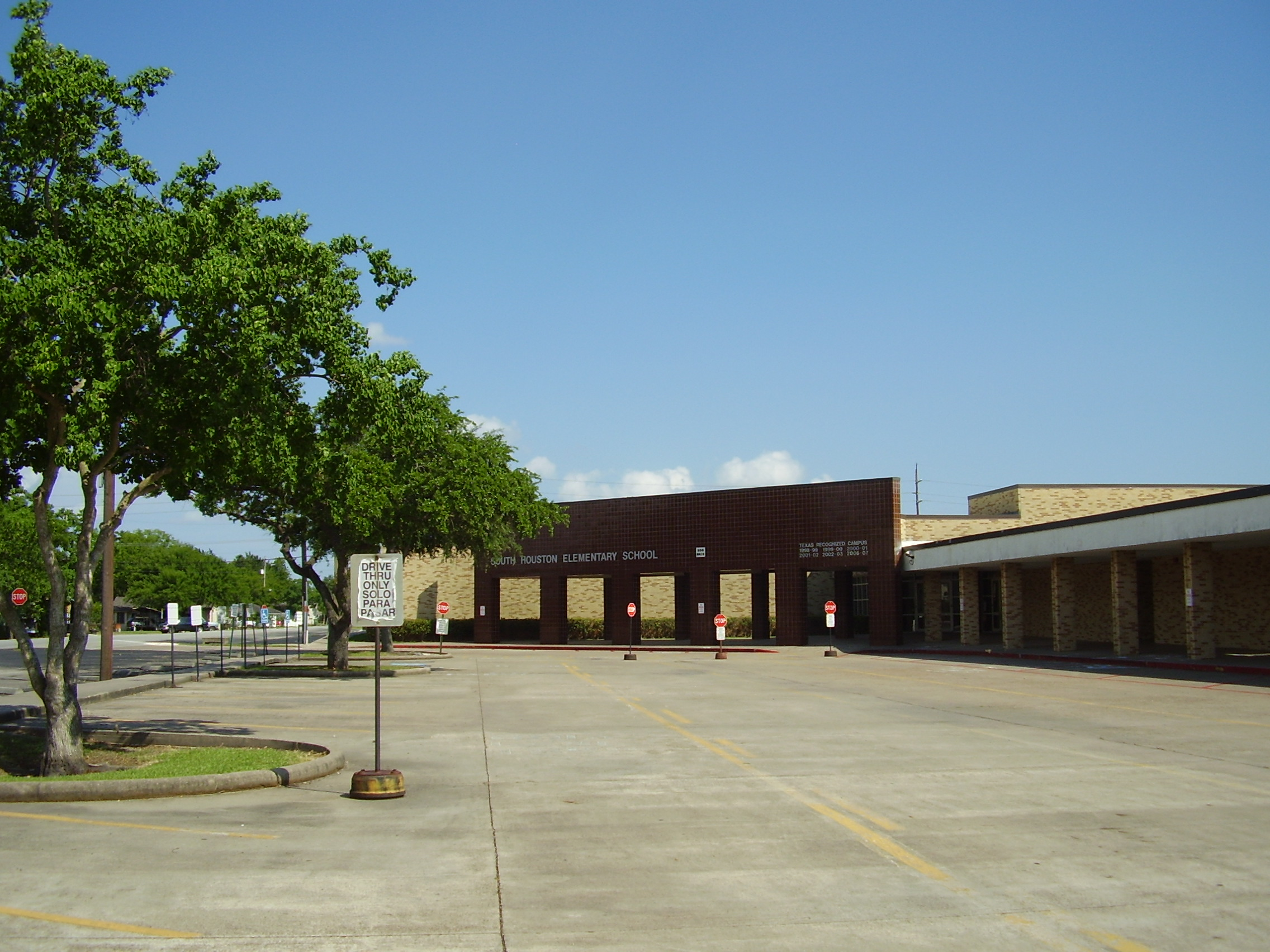
South Houston Elementary School

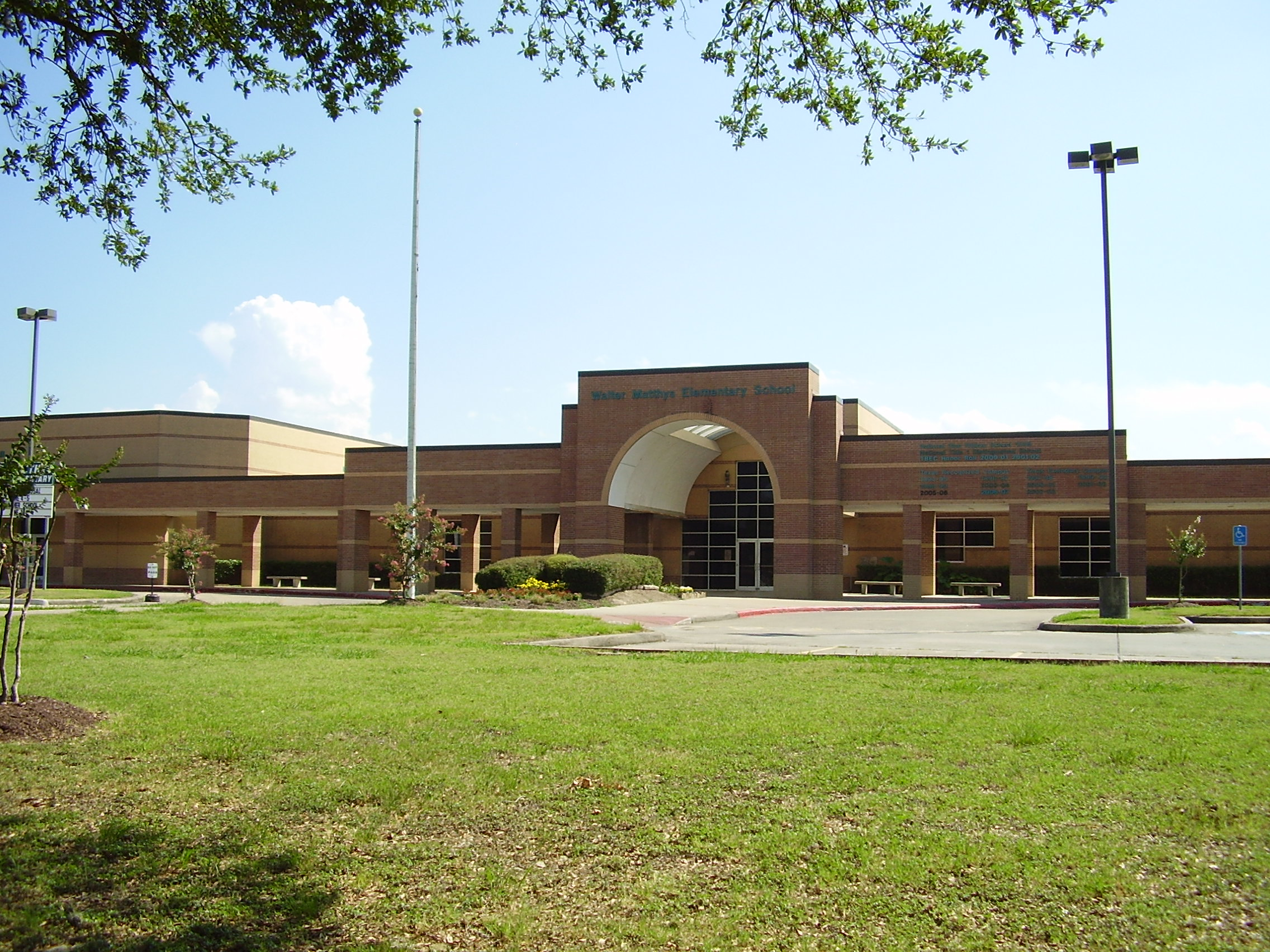
Walter Matthys Elementary School

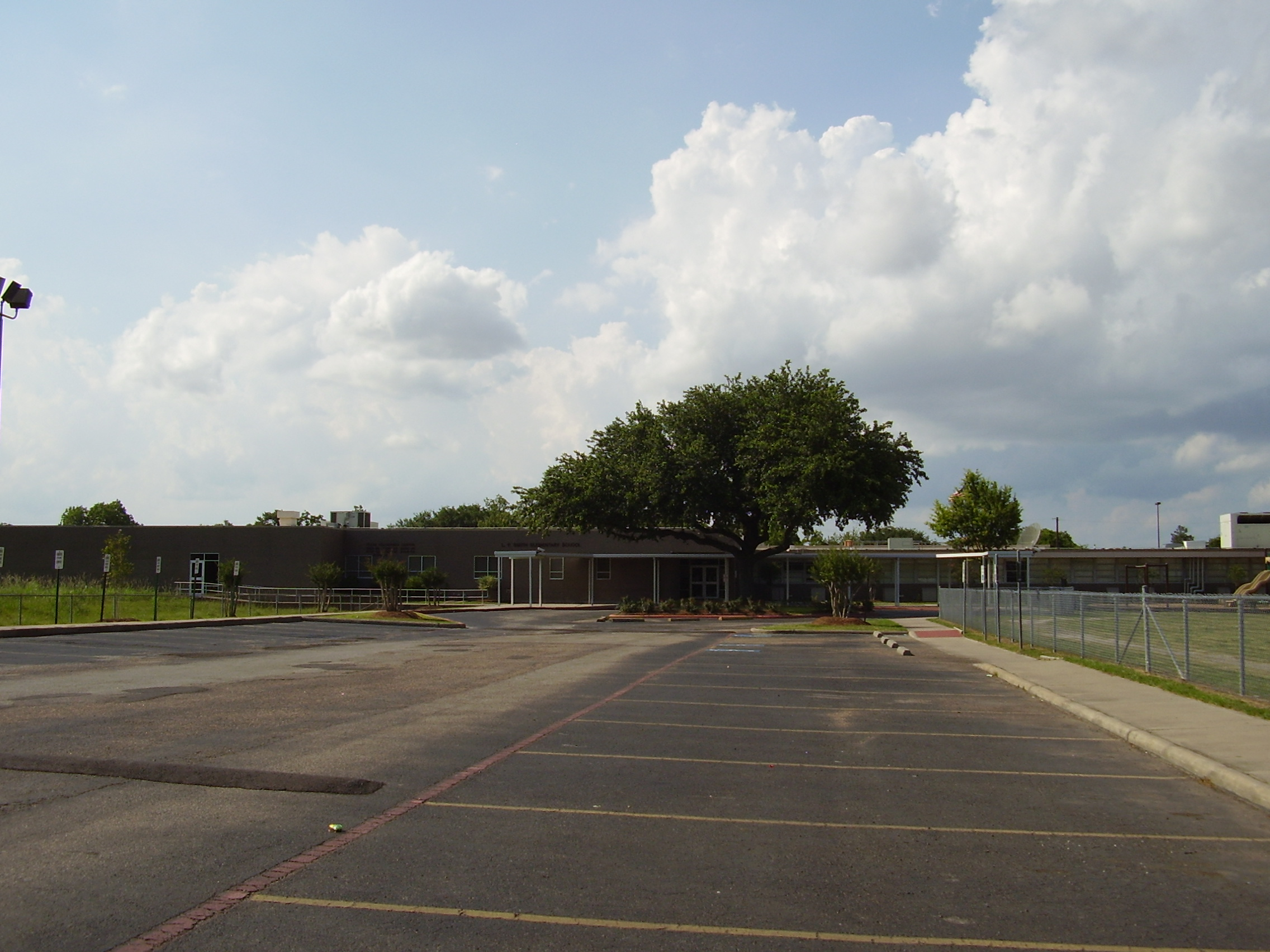
L. F. Smith Elementary School

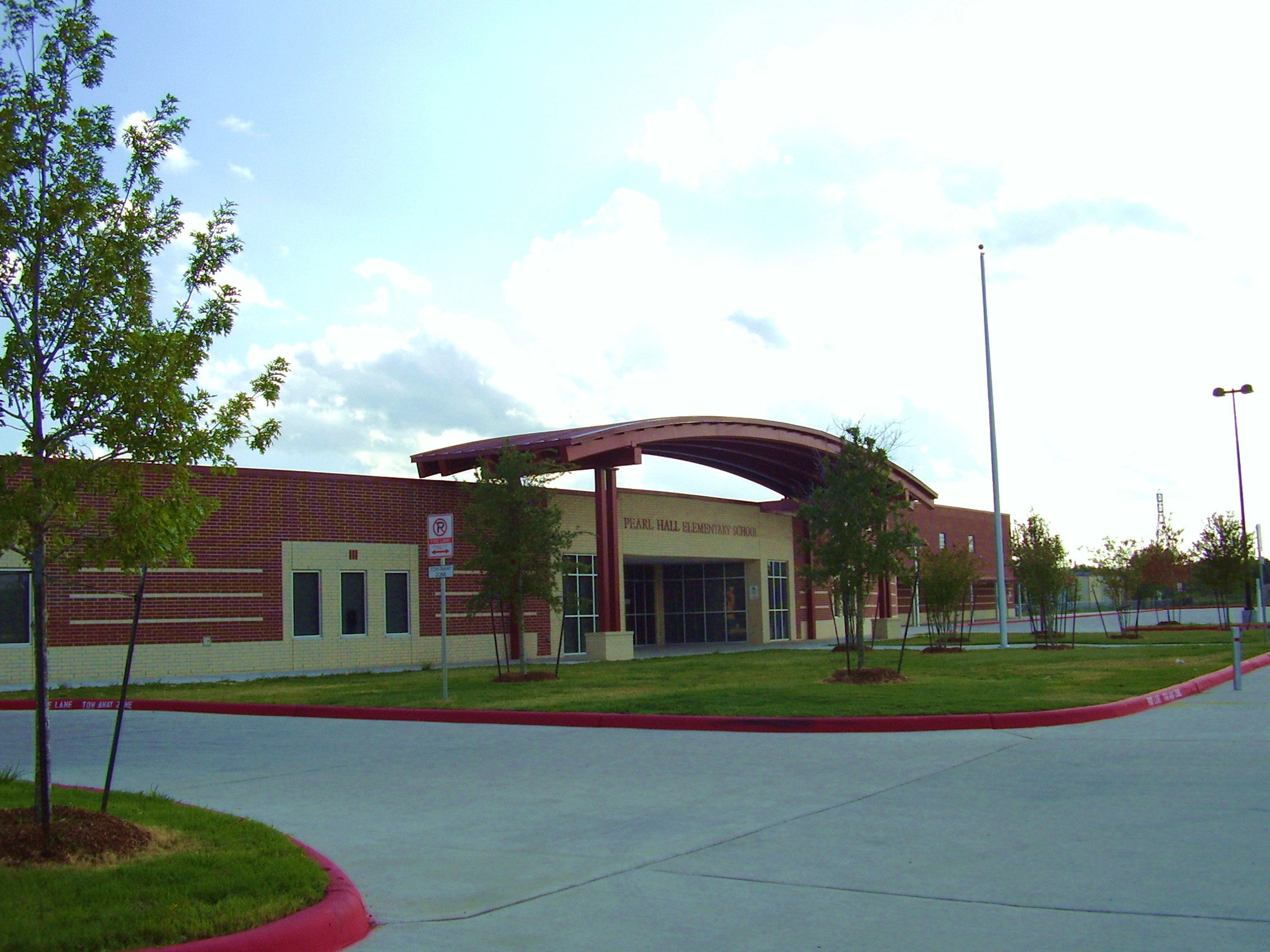
Pearl Hall Elementary School

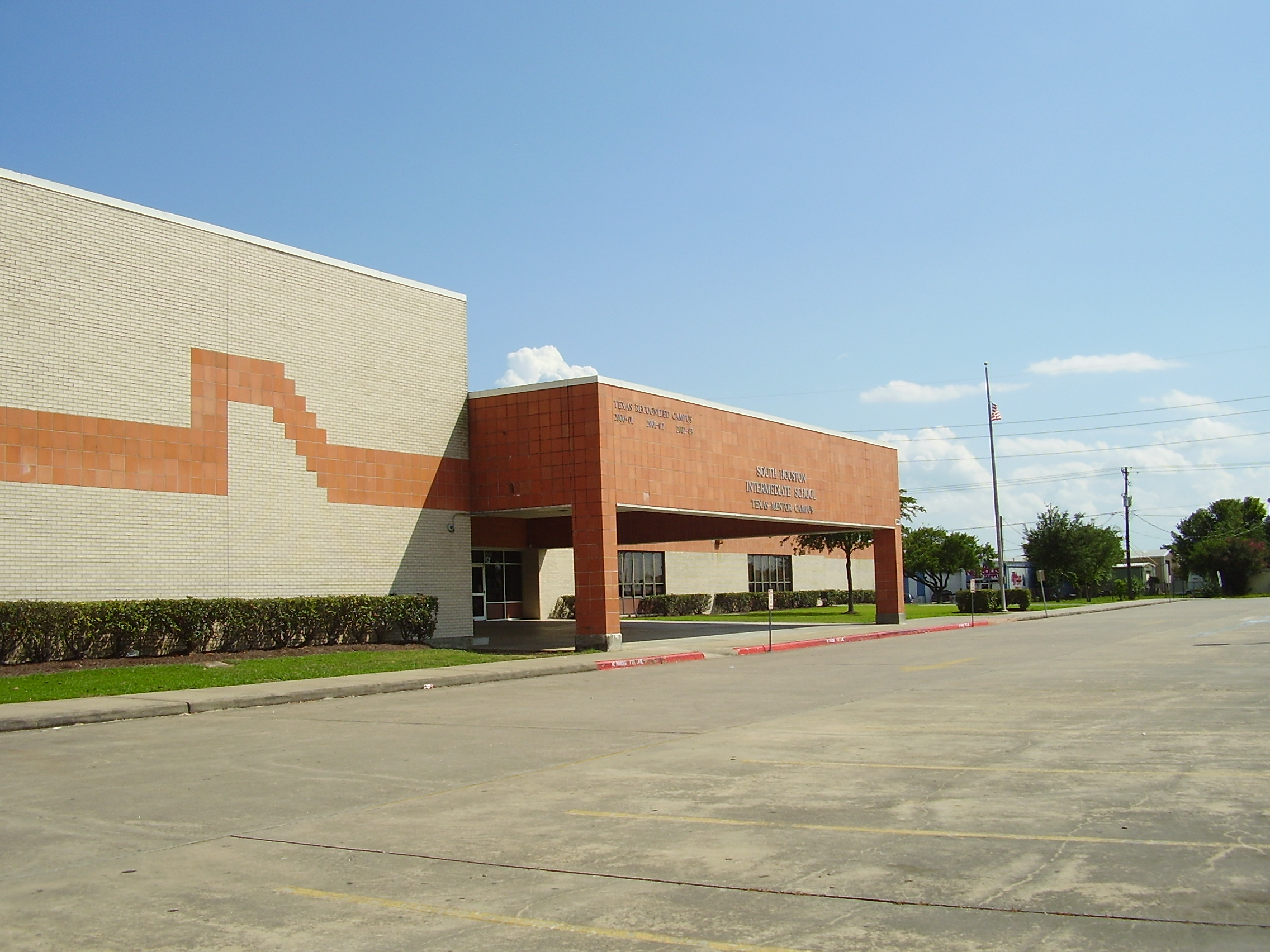
South Houston Intermediate School

== Transportation ==
Harris County Transit serves South Houston.

== Gallery ==
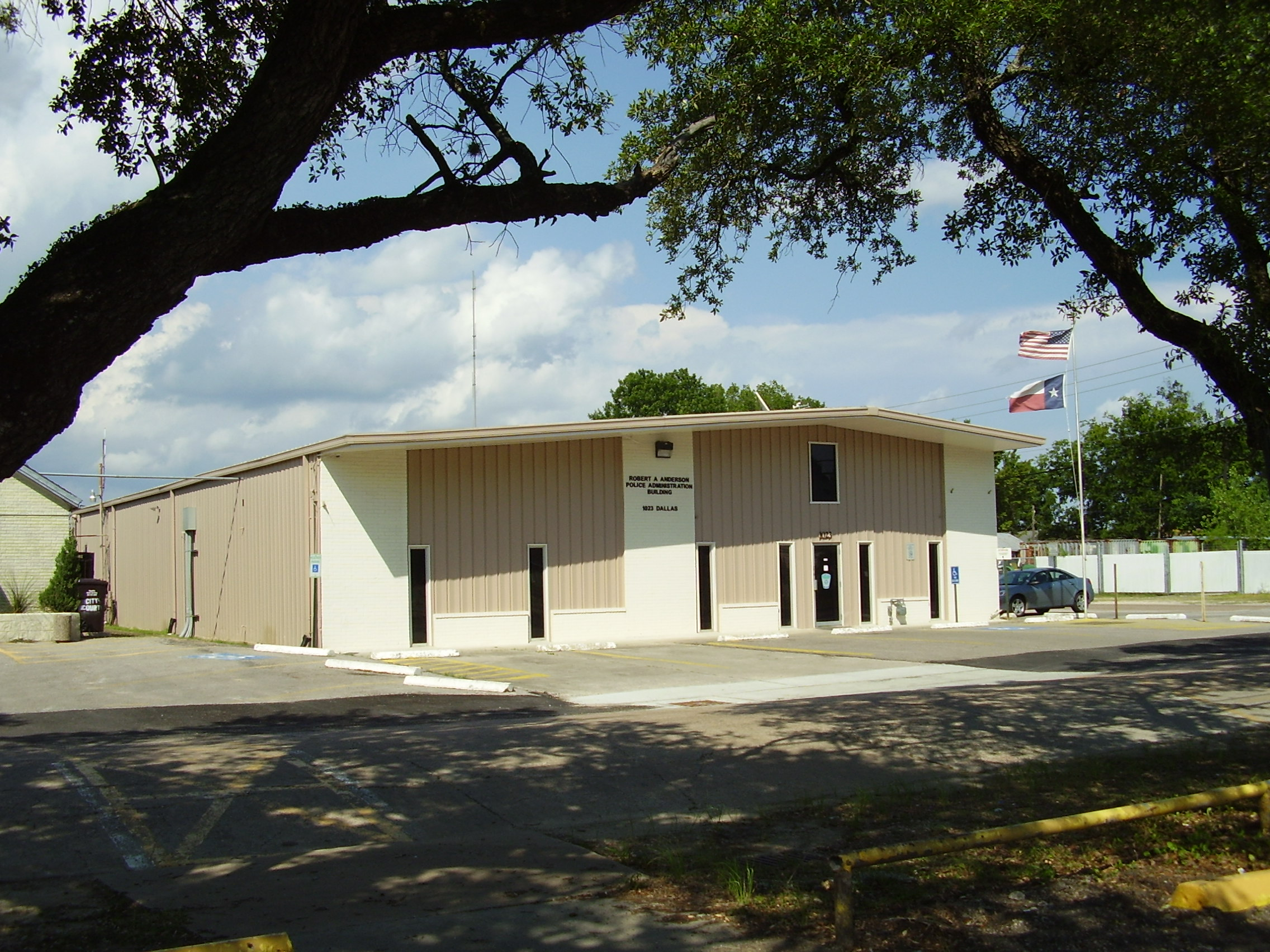
South Houston Police Department front entrance

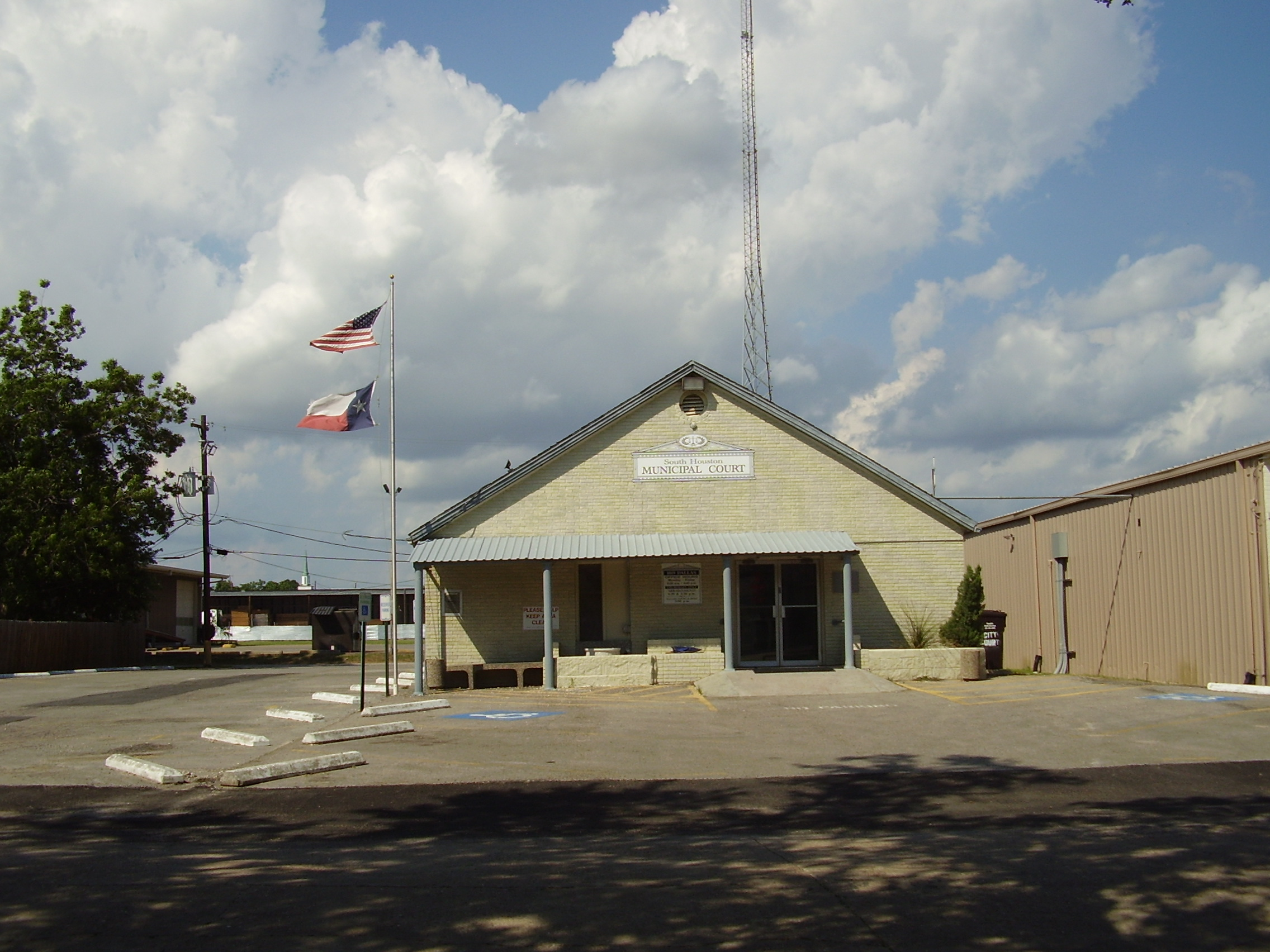
South Houston Municipal Court
