= Pasadena Memorial High School =

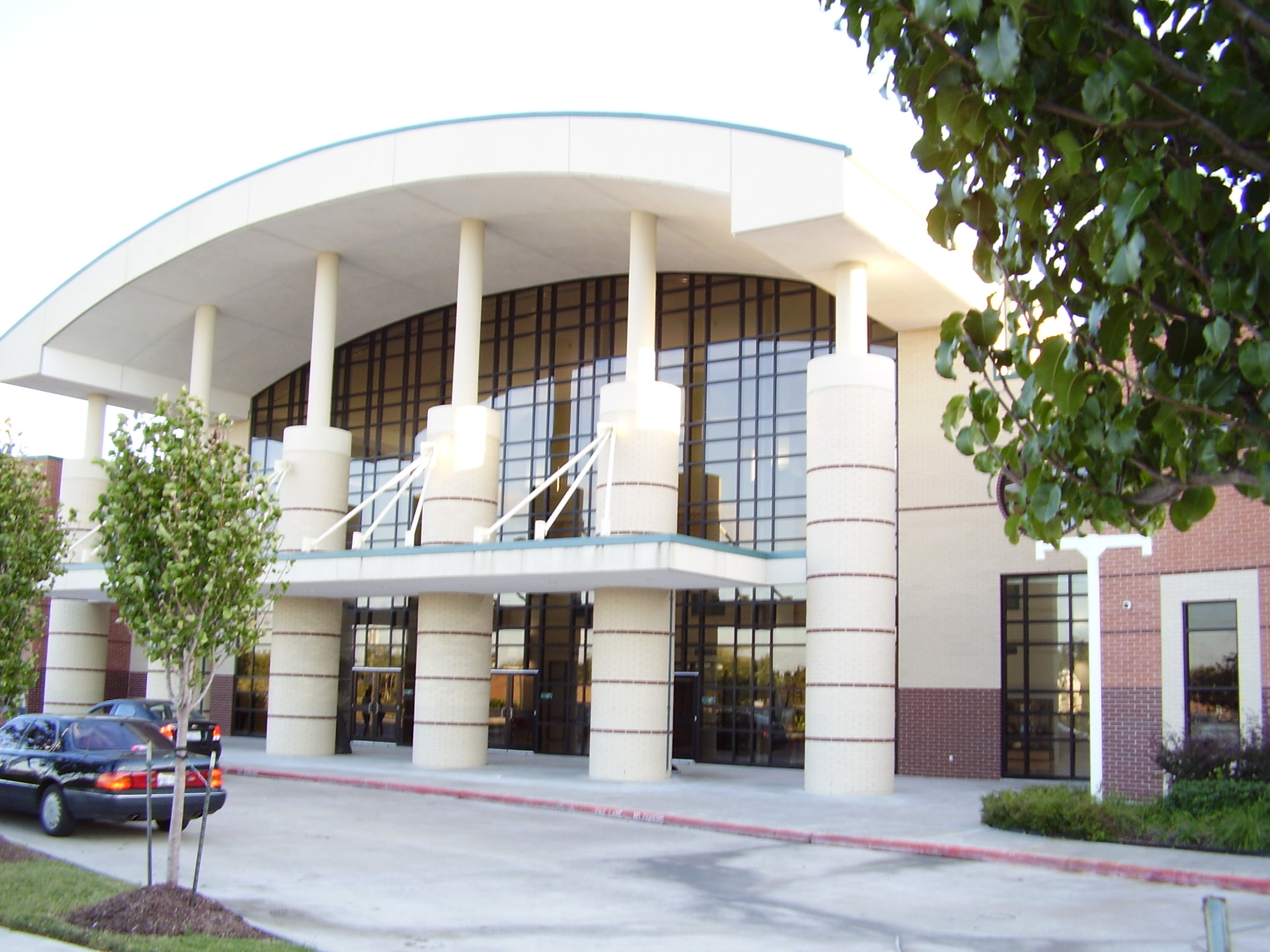

Location
- 4410 Crenshaw Road; Pasadena, Texas 77504; United States; 29.6391°N 95.1748°W

Information
- Motto: Failure Is Not An Option
- Established: 2003
- Founder: Brian Pate
- School district: Pasadena Independent School District
- Superintendent: Dr. DeeAnn Powell
- Faculty: 190.31 (FTE)
- Grades: 9-12
- Average class size: 25 students
- Student to teacher ratio: 16.42
- Hours in school day: 7:15 am - 2:35 pm
- Campus size: 80 acres
- Colors: Teal, gold, and black
- Mascot: Roxy and Renegade
- Nickname: PMHS, Memorial
- Team name: Mavericks
- Rival: J. Frank Dobie High School, Deer Park High School
- Newspaper: The Stampede
- Yearbook: The Frontier
- Budget: $37,977,272
- Website: memorial.pasadenaisd.org

Pasadena Memorial High School (PMHS) is a secondary school located in Pasadena, Texas.

The school serves grades 9 through 12 and is the second-largest school in the Pasadena Independent School District. It is sometimes referred to simply as "Memorial" or as "PMHS" to differentiate it from nearby Pasadena High School.

The current principal is Mike Adams.

== Facilities ==
The school, constructed on an 80-acre (320,000 m^{2}) site, is designed around three main segments. The first segment includes the academic area, library and central administration area. The second segment contains the music and drama departments, auditorium, gymnasium and drill team. The third segment contains the dining hall and vocational laboratories. Two landscaped courtyards that surround the dining hall are used for outdoor dining, a sculpture court, and an art lab. Beyond its functional aspects, the courtyards provide a quiet environment for students and staff.

== Expansion ==
Since the opening of the school, district officials contemplated expanding the school. A week before the end of the first semester in 2006, the school opened a new wing adjacent to the mathematics hall that houses English teachers. The original plan for this wing was for it to be the Freshman Academy, where all freshmen would attend class. However, the plan was not used. PMHS also built a new field house exclusively for its football program right off the south parking lot. Recently, outdoor portable buildings, converted to classrooms, have been provided for overflow as the number of students has exceeded the school's capacity. Students are allotted one additional minute to reach these facilities, which was decreased from the original travel time of two minutes. A student petition was created that had more than five hundred signatures against the time decrease, but the administration denied the students appeal for an additional minute to travel to portable classes claiming that students should "walk faster" as quoted by Assistant Principal Kevin Blain. Plus an addition of security cameras were added in the hallways, cafeteria, and outside of building, along with police officers to ensure more safety due to a survey taken by parents and students who requested more security. A 2014 bond was introduced to expand the campus by adding an Early College High School (ECHS) wing to PMHS. It was proposed to help with the overcrowdedness since the school was originally only made to hold 2,000 students. The ECHS was officially opened at the beginning of the 2017-2018 school year.

== Neighborhoods served ==
The school serves portions of the city of Pasadena including Strawberry Glen and small sections of Houston around Ellington Field, including Genoa Township, Southway Gardens, and Gulf Palms.

== Dress code ==
For the 2016-2017 school year, Pasadena Independent School District has established a new standardized dress code for students. Shirts may be any color. Logos are allowed just as prints, pictures, stripes and plaids are allowed. Shirts should be appropriately sized with sleeves and free of inappropriate designs. Any solid colored pants are allowed, while shorts and shirts are not. However, pants must be free of designs and hemmed. Student ID badges are still required to be worn everyday while on campus.

== Feeder patterns ==
Elementary schools: Burnett, Laura W. Bush, Fisher, Garfield, Genoa, Golden Acres, Jensen, Parks, South Houston, Teague, and Turner.

Middle schools: Lomax, Roberts, And Milstead.

Intermediate schools: Elmer G. Bondy, Park View, and V.W. Miller.

== Clubs, organizations and extracurricular activities ==
Academic Decathlon, Agriculture (FFA), Aquatics (swimming, diving, finswimming, open water), Art Club, Maverick Band, Choir, Orchestra Best Buddies, Broadcast Journalism (MAVision), Business Professionals of America (BPA), Cheerleading, Cosmetology, Drill Team (The Sidekicks), Fellowship FCCLA, Fellowship of Christian Athletes, French Club, Globetrotters, Health Occupations Students of America (HOSA), Hospitality and Management, International Thespian Society, Latin Club, National Honor Society (NHS), Newspaper (The Stampede), Ready Set Teach, Robotics, Sography, Spanish Club, Speech and Debate, Sports Medicine, Student Council, Student Library Advisory Committee (SLAC), Tennis, Texas Association of Future Educators (TAFE), Touch Of Unity, Track, Yearbook (The Mav Yearbook), and Youth for Christ

== Sports ==
The school colors are teal, black, and gold, and the school mascots are Roxy and Renegade: the Mavericks. The students at Memorial show a strong sense of pride, the pride is often referred to as "Bleeding Teal."

The current Head Football Coach and Athletic Director is Jamie Crocker. The previous Head Football coach is Chris Quillian, preceded by John Snelson, who led the Mavericks to the Texas Class 5A State Playoffs each year since 2006. The 2007 team made it to the 3rd round of the playoffs before losing to the eventual 5A-Division 2 State Champion and football superpower, Katy High School, led by Bo Levi Mitchell. The 2008 team made it to round one with Beaumont Westbrook. The 2009 team (Band of Brothers) won the school's first, and only, district championship and made it to round two losing to Clear Springs High school.

During the 2012 varsity football season, Memorial featured the district's first female varsity player. Senior Tara Cole started every game as the teams place kicker and kickoff specialist. She finished the season 42/47 PAT, and 5/6 FG, with a total of 57 points. She was ranked 9th in Texas 5-A schools for overall kicking. (KPRC News Interview) Also starring as Memorial’s Girls varsity goalkeeper, she continued playing soccer during the 2013 season for Sam Houston State University. Tara Cole played 4 years for the Houston Energy International Women’s Football League (IWFL).
