= Genoa, Houston =

Unincorporated Area

Genoa is an area in Houston, Texas, United States located about 15 miles (24 km) southeast of Downtown Houston; it was formerly a distinct unincorporated area in Harris County.

== History ==
J. H. Burnett established Genoa in 1892; he gave the community the name "Genoa" because he believed that the climate was similar to the climate of Genoa, Italy. The post office opened during that year. The founder built a railroad depot serving the Galveston, Houston and Henderson Railroad, five houses, one hotel, and one store.

The community was located along a main street that is now known as Almeda Genoa Road (the road from Almeda to Genoa). The east end of the community was the Old Galveston Road (Texas State Highway 3) and the Galveston, Houston, Henderson Railroad. The western edge was Freestone Street and the railway just to the west. Where the main street continued east from Old Galveston Road became known as Genoa Red Bluff (the road from Genoa to Red Bluff). The community also has another road on the east end of the community that is Allen Genoa Road (the road from Allen to Genoa)

The Handbook of Texas stated that Genoa "grew slowly." In 1914 the community had 200 people and several businesses, including a general store, a dairy, a nursery, a blacksmith shop, and a carpenter. By 1925 the community had 100 people; the population remained at this level until around 1941. During that year Genoa had 400 people and fifteen businesses. The population remained at that level until Houston annexed Genoa in the mid-1960s.

== Government and infrastructure ==
=== Local government ===
Houston City Council District E serves Genoa. As of 2008 Mike Sullivan represents the district.

=== County, state, and federal representation ===
Genoa is located within Harris County Precinct 2; as of 2008 Sylvia Garcia heads Precinct 2.

Genoa is located in District 144 of the Texas House of Representatives. As of 2008, Robert E. Tarlton represents the district. Genoa is within District 11 of the Texas Senate; as of 2008 Mike Jackson represents that district.

Genoa is in Texas's 22nd congressional district.

The United States Postal Service operates the Genoa Post Office at 10935 Almeda Genoa Road.

== Education ==
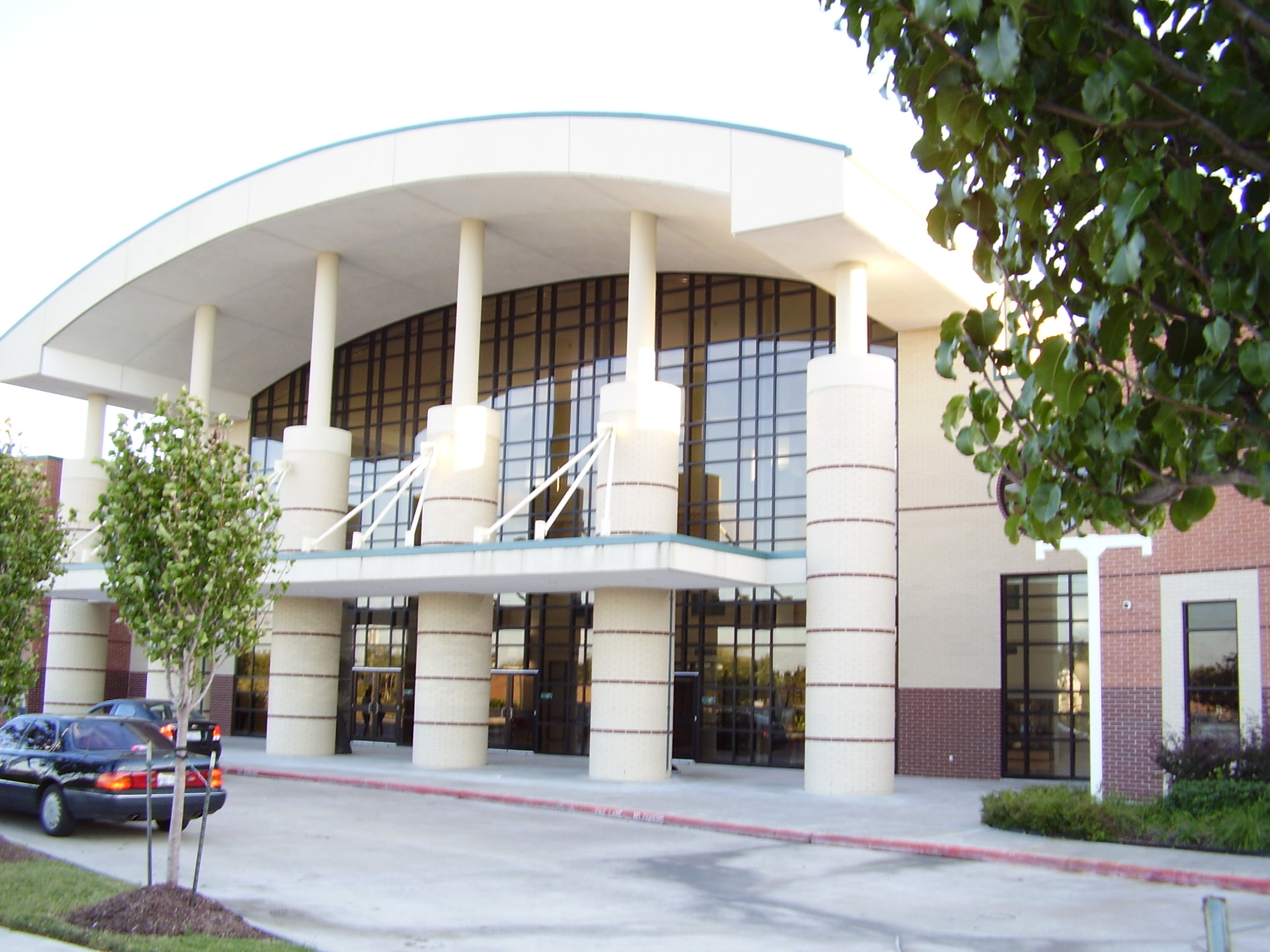
Pasadena Memorial High School

Children in the Genoa neighborhood attend school in the Pasadena Independent School District. The area is zoned to Genoa Elementary School in Houston, Lomax Middle School in Pasadena, Elmer Bondy Intermediate School in Pasadena, and Pasadena Memorial High School in Pasadena.

Despite being located in Houston, it is not served by the Houston Independent School District.

Residents of Pasadena ISD (and therefore Genoa) are zoned to San Jacinto College.

By 1905 a school with one teacher and thirty students appeared.

== Notable residents ==
- Saburo Arai, a Houston-area Japanese American entrepreneur who led the Japanese Association and exempted Japanese already living in Texas from a law which banned ethnic Japanese from owning land
