= Pasadena Independent School District =

School district in Texas

Address
- 1515 Cherrybrook Lane Pasadena, Harris County, Texas, 77502; United States
- Coordinates: 29.6779°N 95.1916°W

District information
- Type: Public
- Grades: Pre-K – 12^{th}
- Established: March 26, 1898; 128 years ago
- President: Marshall Kendrick
- Vice-president: Jack Bailey
- Superintendent: Toni Lopez
- Deputy superintendent(s): Karen Hickman
- Business administrator: Arthur Allen
- Schools: 69
- Budget: US$607.6 mil. (2015-16)
- NCES District ID: 4834320

Students and staff
- Students: 56,282 (2016-2017)
- Teachers: 3,857.95 FTE
- Staff: 4,401.98 FTE
- Student–teacher ratio: 14.16
- Athletic conference: Region 3 (6A): District 22

Other information
- Website: www.pasadenaisd.org

Pasadena Independent School District is a school district that is based in Pasadena, Texas, United States.

Pasadena ISD serves much of southeast Harris County. The district includes most of Pasadena, South Houston, a portion of Houston (including Genoa), and a portion of Pearland.

Each Pasadena ISD house or residential area is assigned to an elementary school (PK-4th), a middle school (5th-6th), an intermediate school (7th-8th), and a high school (9th-12th). Some areas are assigned to fifth grade centers.

In 2019, the school district received a "B" grade from the Texas Education Agency.

== History ==
It was established on March 26, 1898.

According to a report around November 2, 2004, by the Texas Education Agency, among the 30 largest school districts in the state, Pasadena ISD was the 8th fastest-growing district in Texas by population; much of the growth occurred in the "South Belt" area along Beltway 8.

The district was named the National Model School District in 2005 by the International Center for Leadership in Education.

In 2011 voters approved of a new bond which allowed Pasadena ISD to complete building grade 5-6 middle school facilities for all of the district.

== School uniforms ==
All students in Pasadena ISD are required to follow a specific dress code.

As of the 2016-2017 school year, students are free to wear any type of appropriate shirt or dress.

Students are required to wear khaki or navy blue slacks or khaki or blue denim trousers. Skirts and jumpers are also allowed as long as they are in the same styles as the slacks.

The Texas Education Agency specified that the parents and/or guardians of students zoned to a school with uniforms may apply for a waiver to opt out of the uniform policy, so their children do not have to wear the uniform; parents must specify "bona fide" reasons, such as religious reasons or philosophical objections.

== List of schools ==
=== Secondary schools ===
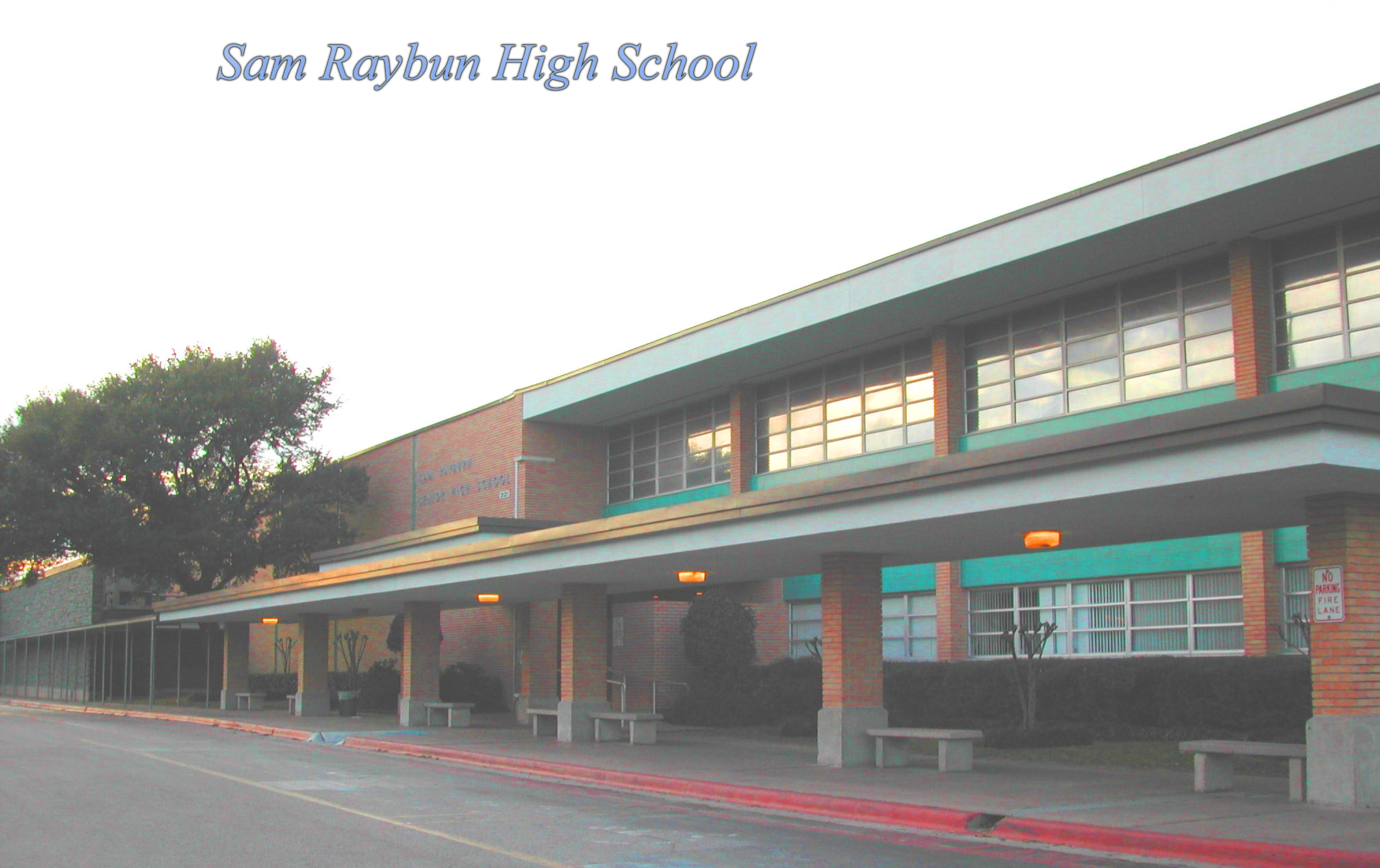
Sam Rayburn High School

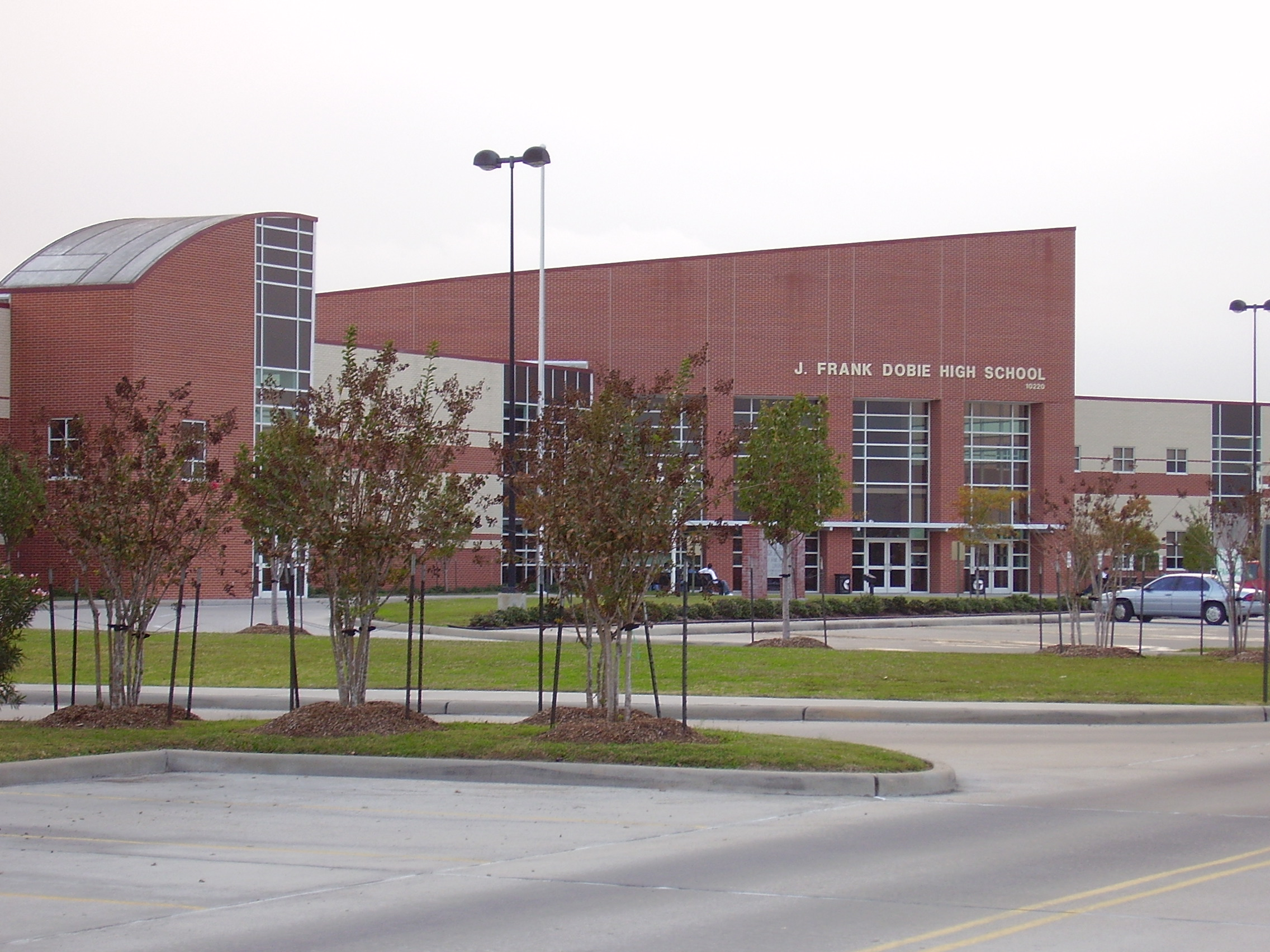
Dobie High School

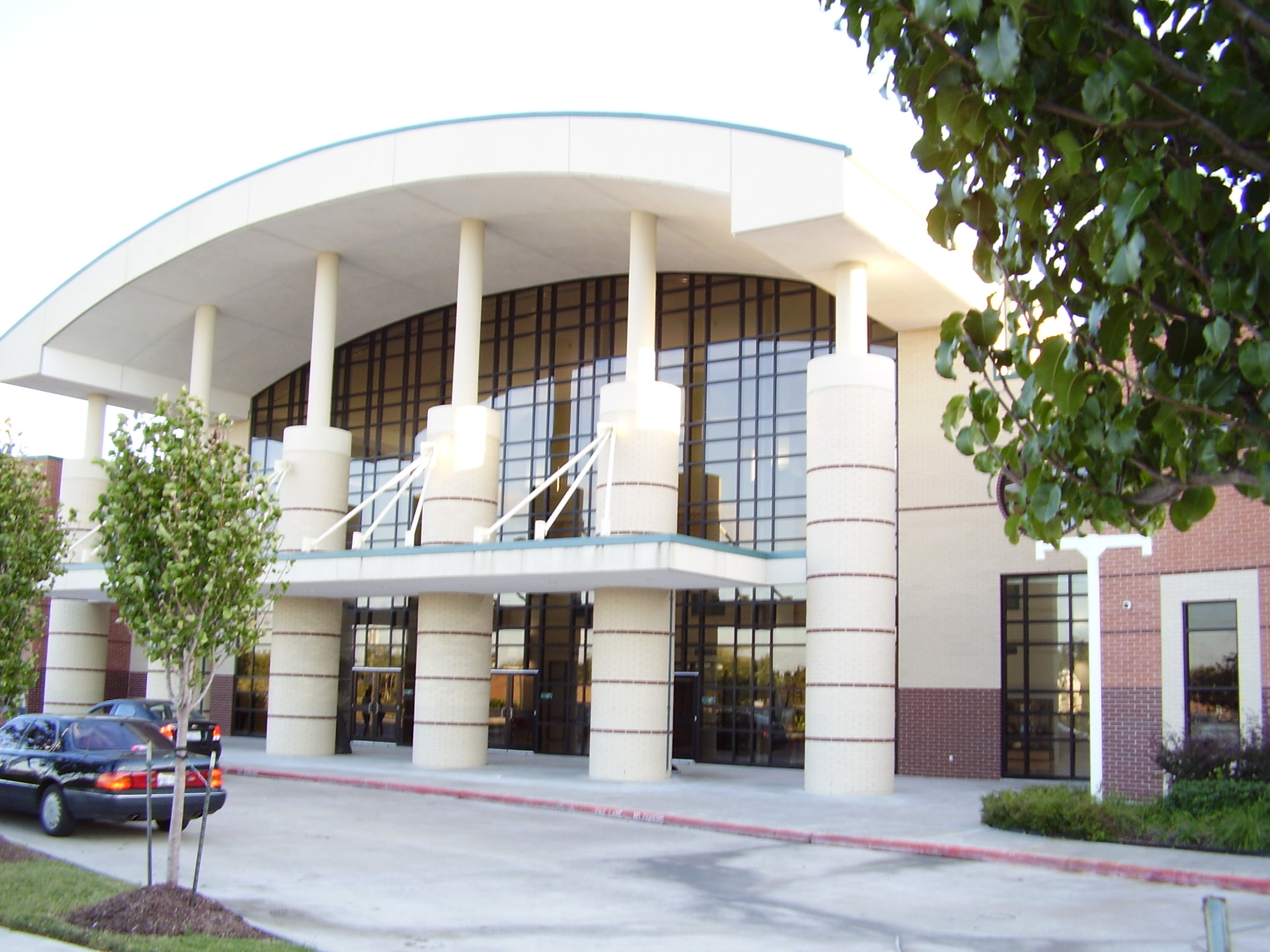
Pasadena Memorial High School

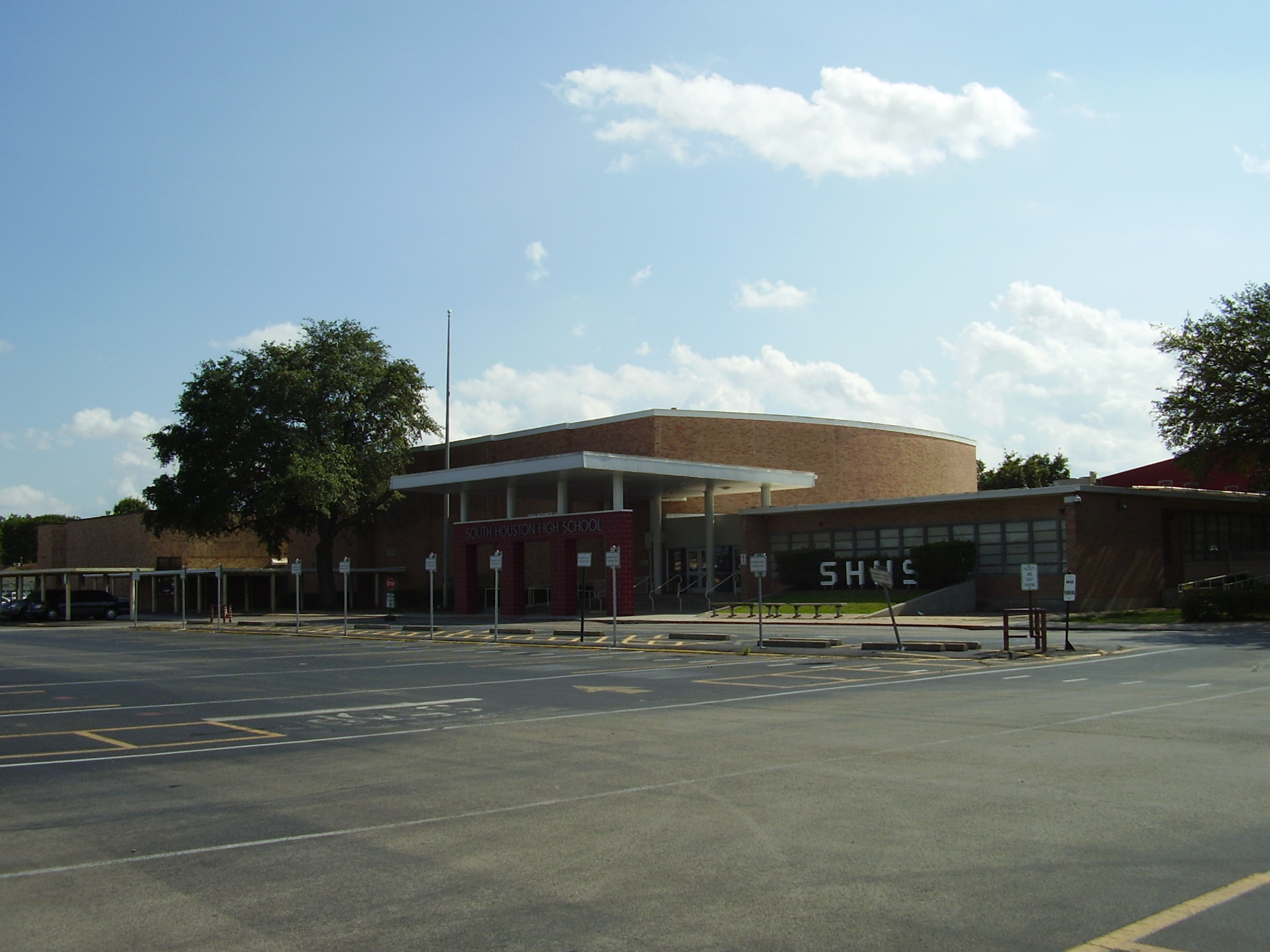
South Houston High School

==== High schools ====
4 in Pasadena, 1 in South Houston, 2 in Houston

- J. Frank Dobie High School (Houston) (1968)
- Pasadena High School (Pasadena) (1924)
- Pasadena Memorial High School (Pasadena) (2003)
- Sam Rayburn High School (Pasadena) (1964)
- South Houston High School (South Houston) (1957)
- The Summit (High School) (Pasadena) (2004)
- Dr. Kirk Lewis Career and Technical High School (Houston)(2014)

Other

- L. P. Card Career and Technical Center (Pasadena)
- Tegeler Career Center (Pasadena)

==== Middle schools ====
- Lorenzo DeZavala Middle School (Pasadena)
- Keller Middle School (Pasadena)
  - Current campus was scheduled to open on August 26, 2014
- Carter Lomax Middle School (Pasadena)
- Dr. Dixie Melillo Middle School (unincorporated area)
- Earnesteen Milstead Middle School (Houston)
- Morris Middle School (Houston) (formerly Morris Fifth Grade Center)
- Rick Schneider Middle School (Houston)
- Bobby Shaw Middle School (Pasadena)
- Marshall Kendrick Middle School (Pasadena)
- Fred Roberts Middle School (Pasadena)

==== Intermediate schools ====
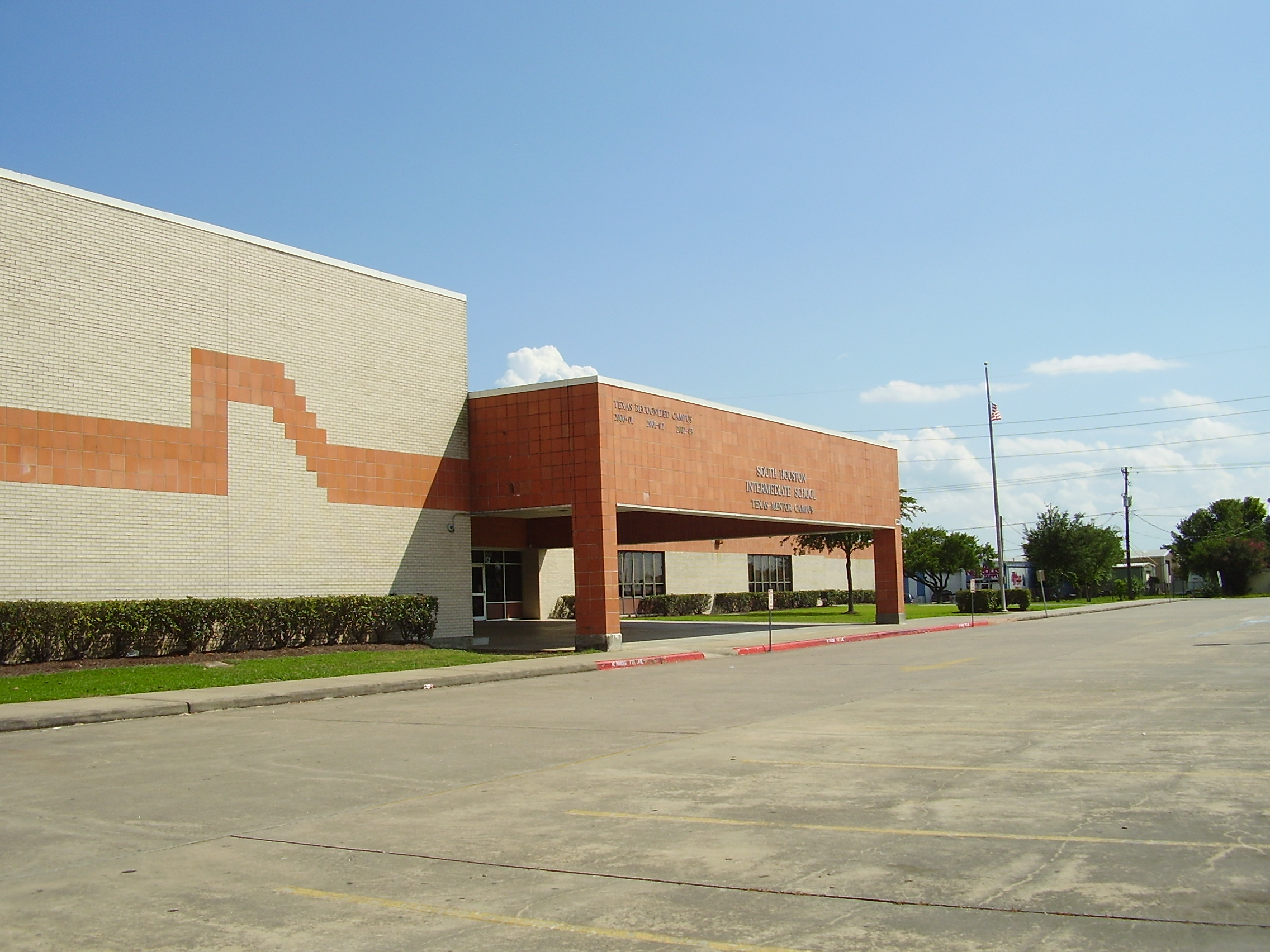
South Houston Intermediate School

7 in Pasadena, 1 in South Houston, 2 in Houston

- Beverly Hills Intermediate School (Houston)
- Elmer Bondy Intermediate School (Pasadena)
- James Andrew Jackson Intermediate School (Pasadena)
  - National Blue Ribbon School in 1999-2000
- Vincent W. Miller Intermediate School (Pasadena)
  - National Blue Ribbon School in 1988-89 and 2001-02
- Park View Intermediate School (Pasadena)
- Queens Intermediate School (Pasadena)
  - Current campus opened in spring 2014
- San Jacinto Intermediate School (Pasadena)
- South Houston Intermediate School (South Houston)
- Southmore Intermediate School (Pasadena)
- George A. Thompson Intermediate School (Houston)
  - Current campus opened on fall 2023

=== Primary schools ===
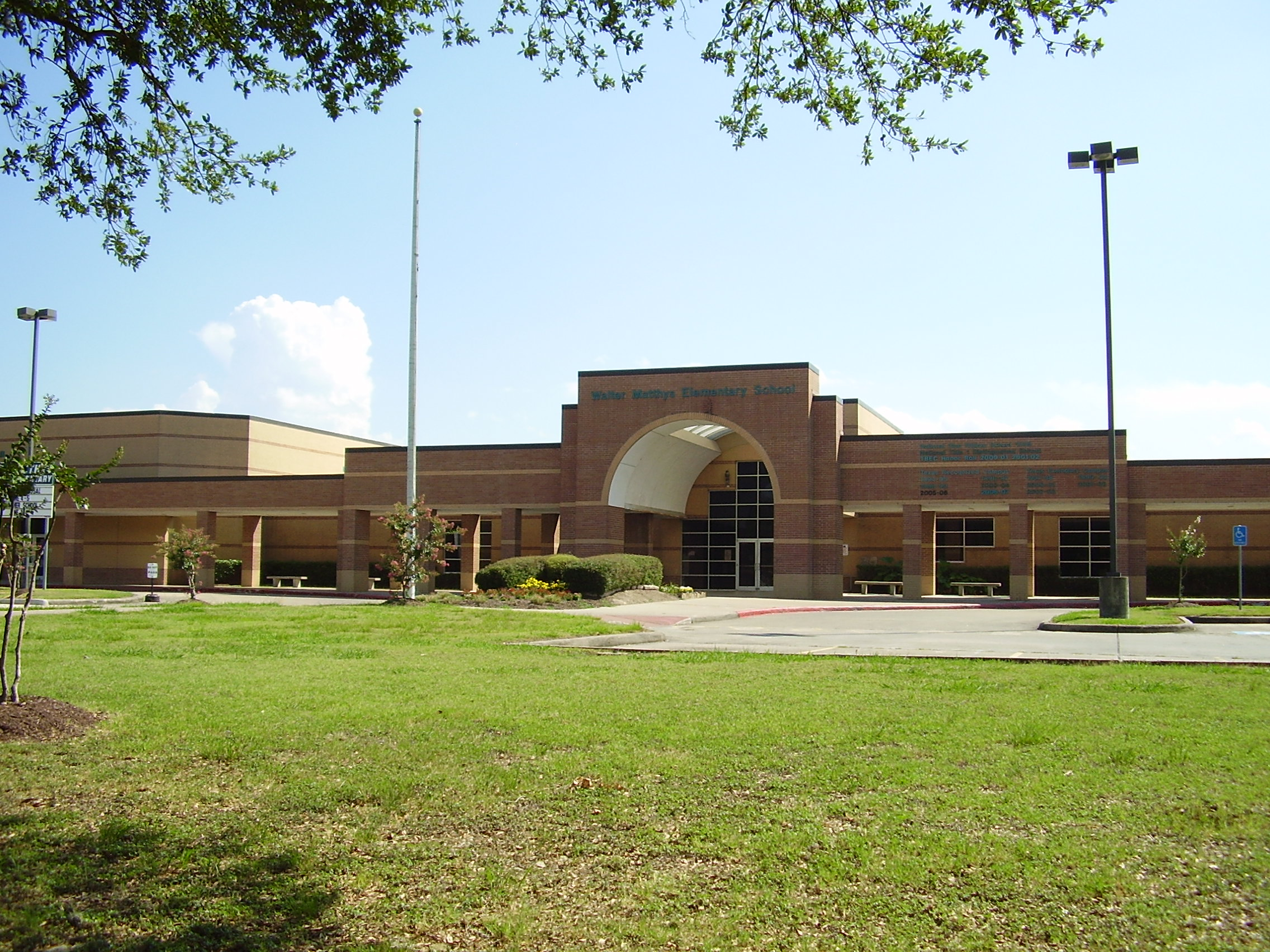
Walter Matthys Elementary School

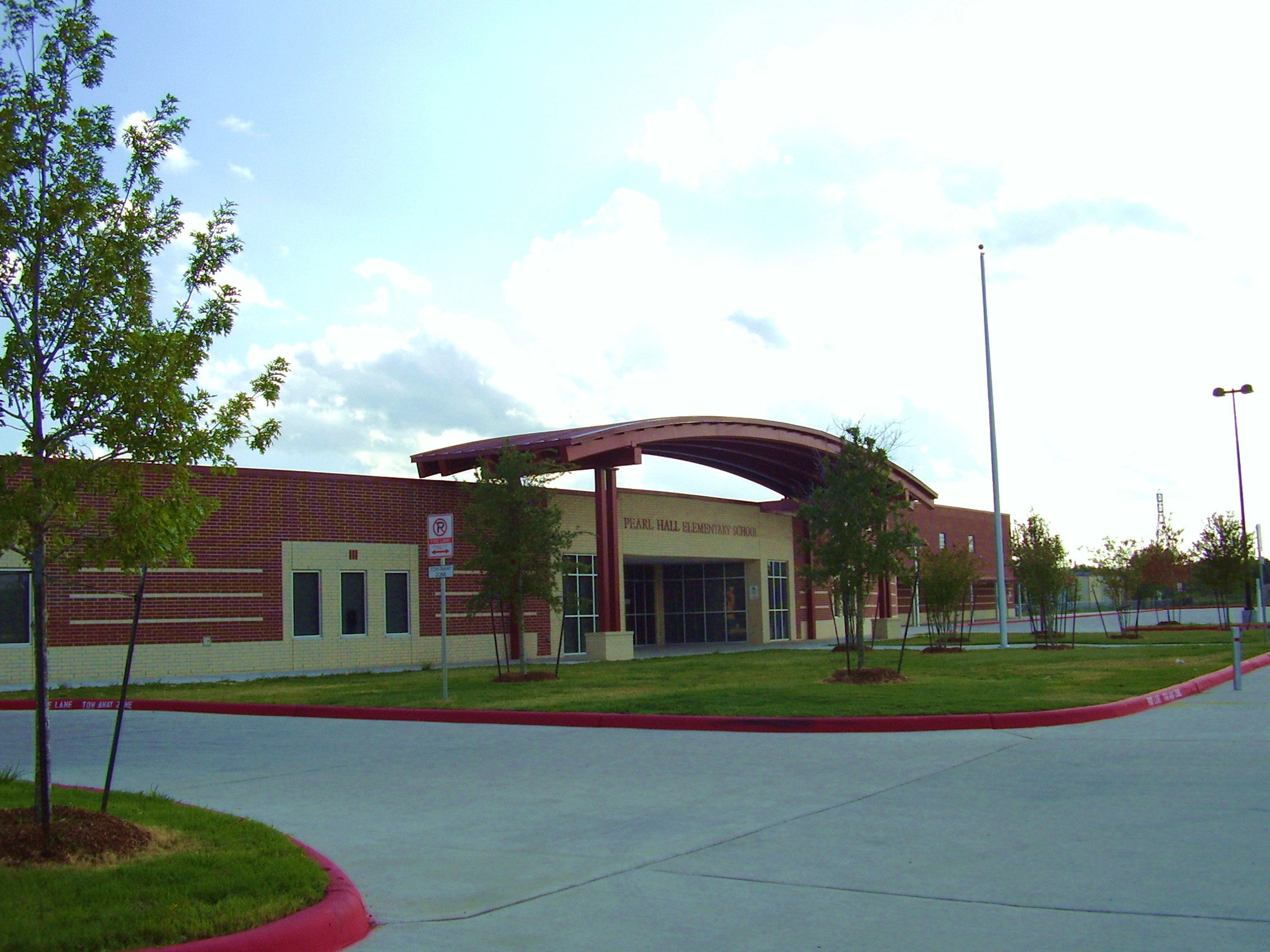
Pearl Hall Elementary School

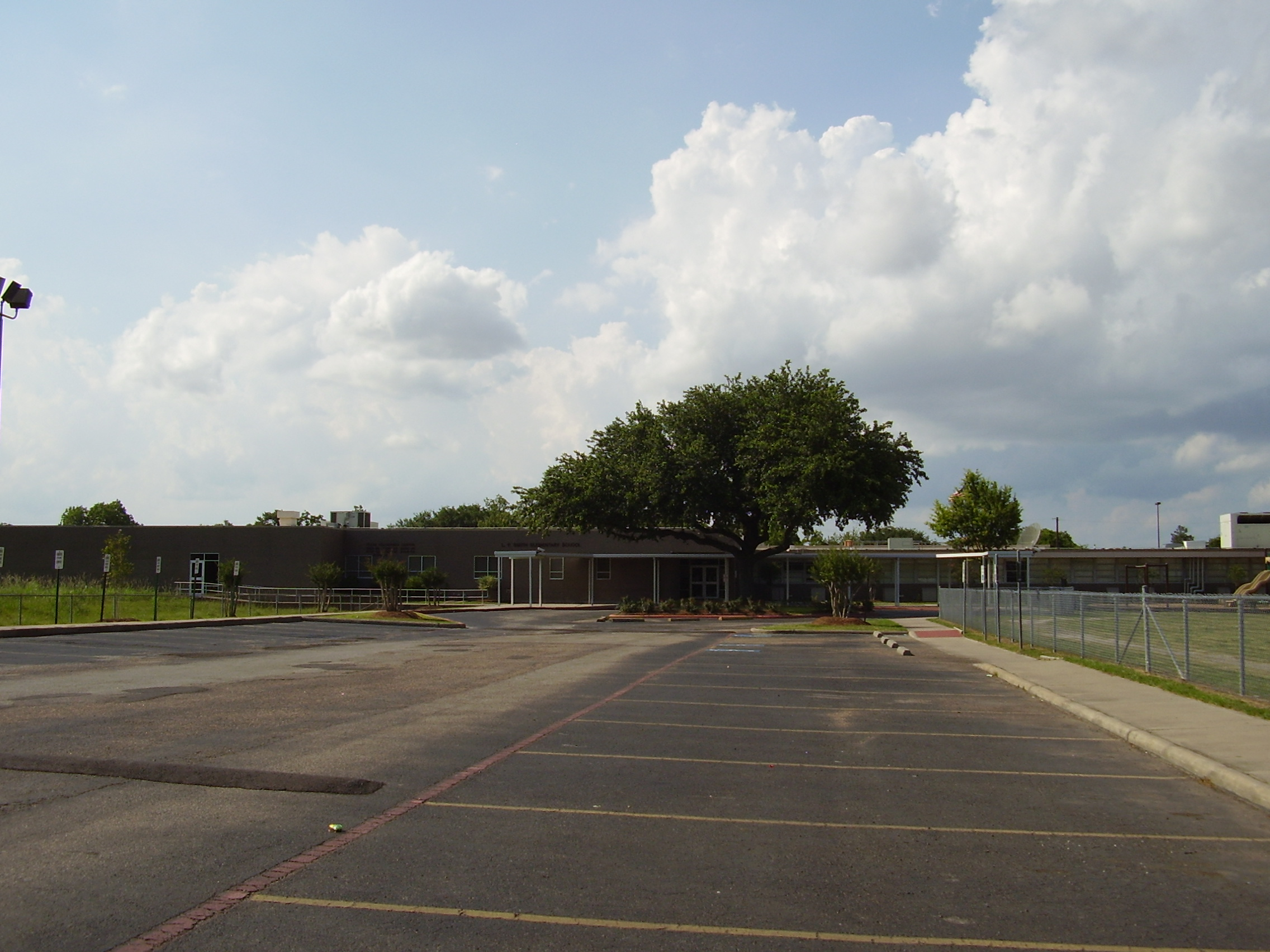
L. F. Smith Elementary School

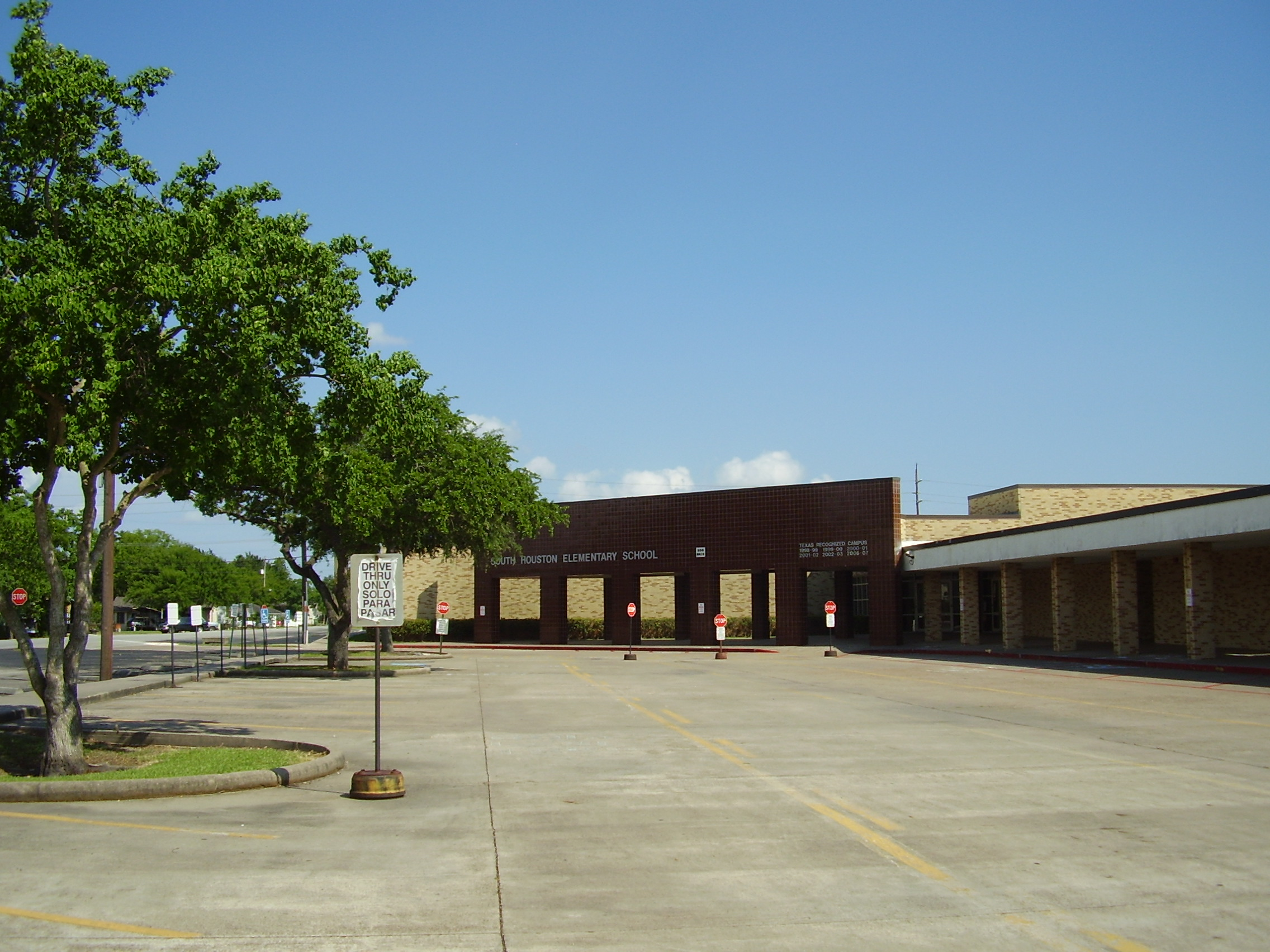
South Houston Elementary School

==== Elementary schools ====
20 in Pasadena, 3 in South Houston, 12 in Houston, 1 in Pearland

- Atkinson Elementary School (Houston)
- Bailey Elementary School (Pasadena)
- Burnett Elementary School (Houston)
- Laura Welch Bush Elementary School (Houston)
- Harley W. Fisher Elementary School (Pasadena)
- Robert Bevis Frazier Elementary School (Houston)
- A.B. Freeman Elementary School (Houston)
- Gardens Elementary School (Pasadena)
  - Current campus scheduled to open in late October/early November 2014
- Garfield Elementary School (Houston)
- Genoa Elementary School (Houston)
- Golden Acres Elementary School (Pasadena)
- Thomas Hancock Elementary (Houston)
- Jensen Elementary School (Pasadena)
- Charles D. Jessup Elementary School (Houston)
- Kruse Elementary School (Pasadena)
- Walter Matthys Elementary School (South Houston)
  - National Blue Ribbon School in 1998-99
- McMasters Elementary School (Pasadena)
- Meador Elementary School (Houston)
- Richard H. Moore Elementary School (Houston)
- Felix Morales Elementary School (Pasadena)
- Parks Elementary School (Pasadena)
- Pearl Hall Elementary School (South Houston)
- Pomeroy Elementary School (Pasadena)
- Red Bluff Elementary School (Pasadena)
- Richey Elementary School (Pasadena)
- L.F. Smith Elementary School (South Houston)
- Mae Smythe Elementary School (Pasadena)
- South Belt Elementary School (Pearland)
  - South Belt took areas previously zoned to Frazier and Moore elementaries.
- South Houston Elementary School (South Houston)
  - Current campus opened in spring 2014
- South Shaver Elementary School (Pasadena)
  - Current campus scheduled to open on September 8, 2014
- Sparks Elementary School (Pasadena)
- Stuchbery Elementary School (Houston)
- Carroll Teague Elementary School (Pasadena)
- Harvey Turner Elementary School (Pasadena)
- Williams Elementary School (Pasadena)
- Young Elementary School (Pasadena)

== See also ==
- List of school districts in Texas
