= Pasadena High School (Pasadena, Texas) =

Location
- 206 Shaver St; Pasadena, Texas 77506; United States
- Coordinates: 29.709911°N 95.212856°W

Information
- School type: Public, High School
- Motto: The Eagle Way: Courage, Responsibility and Respect
- Established: 1924 at current location
- School district: Pasadena Independent School District
- Principal: Laura Gomez
- Staff: 164.87 (FTE)
- Grades: 9-12
- Enrollment: 2,319 (2018-19)
- Student to teacher ratio: 14.07
- Colors: Green and White
- Teams: Mighty Eagles
- Website: pasadena.pasadenaisd.org

Pasadena High School is the first established high school in Pasadena, Texas, located along Texas State Highway 225. It serves grades 9th through 12 and is part of the Pasadena Independent School District. The principal (as of June 26, 2019) is Mrs. Laura Gomez. Pasadena High School's mascot is an eagle named "Baldy". The school colors are green and white.

== Feeder pattern ==
Elementary schools that feed into Pasadena High School include:

- Gardens
- Kruse
- L.F. Smith
- Morales
- Red Bluff
- Richey
- South Shaver
- Pomeroy
- Williams

Middle schools that feed into Pasadena High School include:

- Bobby Shaw
- DeZavala
- Keller
- Sullivan

Intermediate schools that feed into Pasadena High School include:

- Jackson
- Queens
- San Jacinto
- Southmore

== Sports ==
Pasadena has a diverse sports programs including baseball, basketball, cross-country, track, football, soccer, volleyball, golf, tennis, aquatics (swimming, diving, fin swimming, open water) and softball. Football and basketball have the most storied tradition with a state finalist in football, a state championship in basketball, and state championships in track.

The facilities at Pasadena High School have gone through major renovations. All sub-varsity games are held on campus while some Varsity contests are held in Bob Barfield Gymnasium on campus named after Coach Barfield who led the Eagles to their State Finalist run in football. The district facilities shared by the other 4 high schools are Pasadena Veteran's Memorial Stadium for football and soccer, Auxiliary Stadium, basketball and volleyball share Weldon "Stoney" Phillips Field House which is named after Coach Phillips who coached the Eagles from 1951 to 1957. Baseball is played at Maguire Field which is named after Coach John "Maggie" Maguire who coached the Eagles Baseball team to the state Championship Game. Varsity contests and Softball and sub-varsity baseball games are played at the P.I.S.D. Sports Complex. The aquatics program (swimming, diving, finswimming, open water) trains and competes at Shippey Aquatic Center located at the Pasadena ISD Athletic Complex.

=== Football history ===
- District Champions 1937, 1940, 1943, 1944, 1945, 1946, 1958, 1963, 1970, 1996
- Bi-District Finalists 1937, 1940, 1943, 1944, 1945, 1946, 1958, 1963, 1970, 1994, 1995, 1996
- Bi-District Champions 1937, 1940, 1943, 1944, 1945, 1958, 1963
- Regional Finalists 1937, 1940, 1943, 1944, 1945
- Regional Champions 1945
- State Quarter Finalists 1958, 1963
- State Quarter Champions 1958
- State Semi-Finalists 1958
- State Semi-Final Champions 1958
- State Runner-Up 1958

== Organizations ==
Pasadena High School's organizations consist of The Eagle Alliance (band), The Junior ROTC (Marine Division), Orchestra, The Eagle Escort (dance team), HOSA, Choir, Theatre, photography and a slew of clubs and organizations.

== Notable alumni ==
- Bill Henry (Class of 1946), former American professional baseball player
- Bert Coan (Class of 1958), former American football player
- Paul Ratliff (Class of 1962), former Major League Baseball player
- Robert Talton (Class of 1963), member of the Texas House of Representatives from Pasadena from 1993 to 2009.
- John Eddie Williams (Class of 1972), pharmaceutical injury and mass tort attorney and founding partner of Williams Hart based in Houston.
- Marlen Esparza (Class of 2007), American professional boxer
