= List of neighborhoods in Houston =

The city of Houston, Texas, contains many neighborhoods, ranging from planned communities to historic wards. No uniform standard exists for what constitutes an individual neighborhood within the city; however, the city of Houston does recognize a list of 88 "super neighborhoods" that encompass broadly recognized regions. According to the city, a super neighborhood is a "geographically designated area where residents, civic organizations, institutions, and businesses work together to identify, plan, and set priorities to address the needs and concerns of their community."

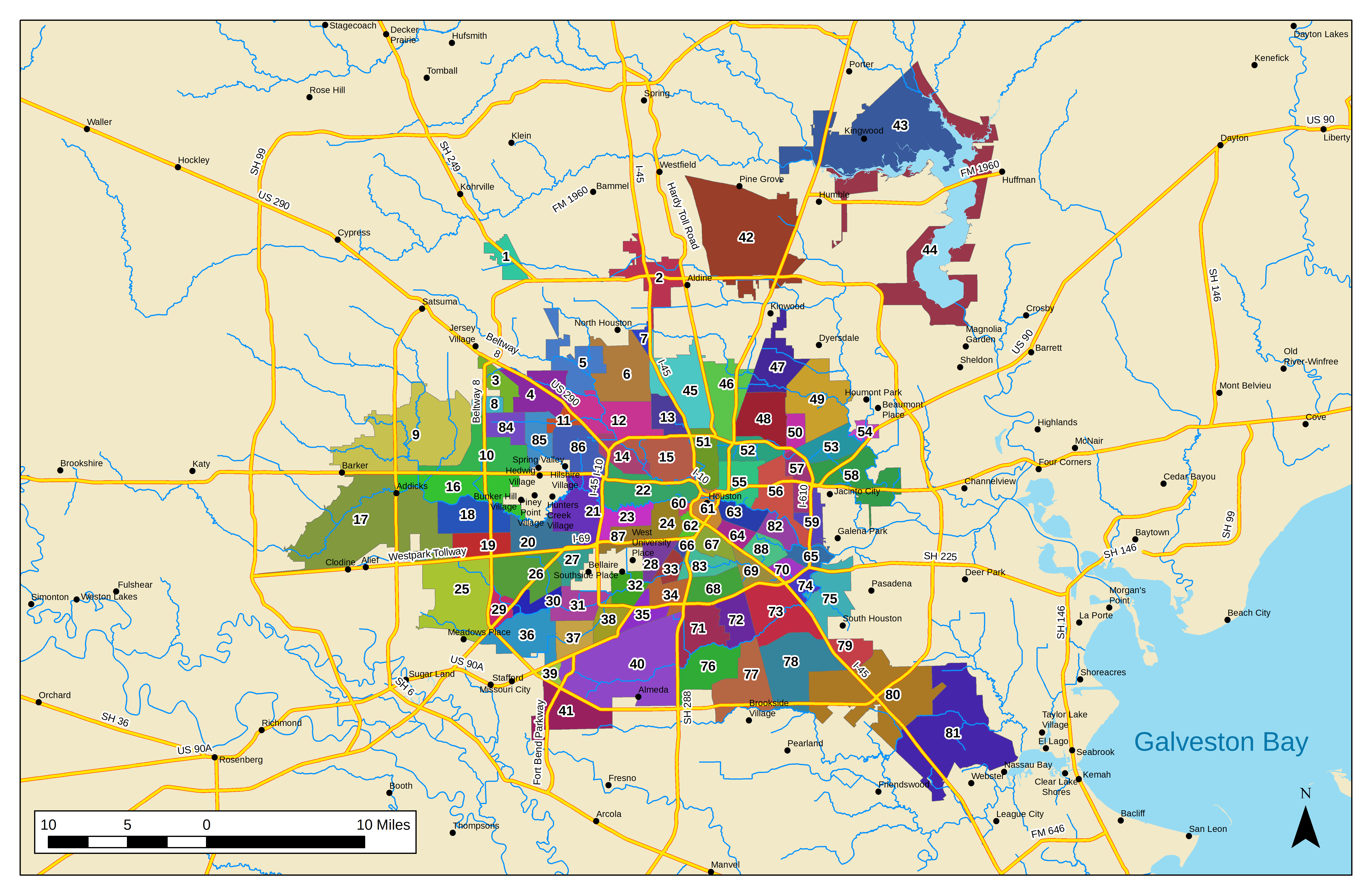
Map of the super neighborhoods of Houston

A list of the super neighborhoods, in the numerical order as assigned by the city, is shown below:

#	Name	Location relative to downtown Houston	Approximate boundaries
1	Willowbrook	Northwest	Along Texas State Highway 249 northwest of Beltway 8
2	Greater Greenspoint	North	Around the junction of Beltway 8 and Interstate 45 North
3	Carverdale	Northwest	South of the junction of Beltway 8 and U.S. Route 290
4	Fairbanks/Northwest Crossing	Northwest	Along U.S. Route 290 between Interstate 610 and Beltway 8
5	Greater Inwood	Northwest	North of Fairbanks/Northwest Crossing and east of Acres Home
6	Acres Home	Northwest	West of Interstate 45 North and south of State Highway 249
7	Hidden Valley	North	In a triangular area between Veterans Memorial Drive, State Highway 249, and Interstate 45 North
8	Westbranch	West	Along Beltway 8 south of Jersey Village
9	Addicks/Park Ten	West	Includes the entirety of Addicks Reservoir and a small area between the reservoir and Interstate 10 west
10	Spring Branch West	West	North of Interstate 10 west between Addicks Reservoir and Blalock Road
11	Langwood	Northwest	Between Hempstead Highway and U.S. Route 290 midway between Interstate 610 and Beltway 8
12	Central Northwest (formerly Near Northwest)	Northwest	East of U.S. Route 290 and north of Interstate 610
13	Independence Heights	North	West of Interstate 45 north and north of Interstate 610
14	Lazybrook/Timbergrove	Northwest	West of White Oak Bayou and south of Interstate 610 north
15	Greater Heights	Northwest	East of White Oak Bayou, south of Interstate 610, west of Interstate 45, and north of Interstate 10
16	Memorial	West	East of Texas State Highway 6, south of Interstate 10 west, west of the Memorial Villages, and north of Buffalo Bayou
17	Eldridge/West Oaks	West	West of Dairy Ashford Road, north of Westpark Tollway, and south of Buffalo Bayou; includes Barker Reservoir
18	Briar Forest	West	East of Dairy Ashford Road, south of Buffalo Bayou, west of Gessner Road, and north of Westheimer Road
19	Westchase	West	East of West Houston Center Boulevard, south of Westheimer Road, west of Gessner Road, and north of Westpark Tollway
20	Mid-West (formerly Woodlake/Briarmeadow)	West	East of Gessner Road, south of Buffalo Bayou, west of Voss and Chimney Rock roads, and north of Westpark Tollway
21	Greater Uptown	West	West of Interstate 610 between Interstate 10 and Interstate 69
22	Washington Avenue Coalition/Memorial Park	West	East of Interstate 610, south of Interstate 10, west of Interstate 45, and north of Buffalo Bayou
23	Afton Oaks/River Oaks	West	Straddles Buffalo Bayou east of Interstate 610
24	Neartown/Montrose	Southwest	Straddles Montrose Boulevard east of Shepherd Drive
25	Alief	Southwest	West of Beltway 8 and south of Westpark Tollway
26	Sharpstown	Southwest	Trapezoidal area bound by Beltway 8 to the west, Westpark Tollway to the north, Interstate 69 to the east, and Brays Bayou to the south
27	Gulfton	Southwest	North of the city of Bellaire and south of Interstate 69
28	University Place	Southwest	East of Kirby Drive, south of Interstate 69, west of Main Street, and north of Brays Bayou
29	Westwood	Southwest	Triangular area between Beltway 8, Brays Bayou, and Interstate 69
30	Braeburn	Southwest	Along north bank of Brays Bayou immediately east of Interstate 69
31	Meyerland	Southwest	Along north bank of Brays Bayou immediately west of Interstate 610 west
32	Braeswood	Southwest	Along north bank of Brays Bayou immediately east of Interstate 610 west
33	Medical Center	South	South of Hermann Park between Main Street and Brays Bayou
34	Astrodome Area	South	South of Brays Bayou between State Highway 288 and Interstate 610
35	South Main	South	Between Highway 90 Alternate (Main Street) and Holmes Road along Interstate 610 south
36	Brays Oaks (formerly Greater Fondren S.W.)	Southwest	Inside Beltway 8 between Highway 90 Alternate and Interstate 69
37	Westbury	Southwest	North of Highway 90 Alternate and east of Post Oak Road
38	Willow Meadows/Willowbend	Southwest	Enclosed by Highway 90 Alternate, Post Oak Road, and Interstate 610
39	Fondren Gardens	Southwest	Enclosed by Highway 90 Alternate, Beltway 8, and Fort Bend Parkway
40	Central Southwest	South	Large area enclosed by Beltway 8, Fort Bend Parkway, Highway 90 Alternate, Holmes Road, and State Highway 288
41	Fort Bend/Houston	Southwest	South of Beltway 8 and east of Fort Bend Parkway in Fort Bend County
42	IAH Airport	North	North of Beltway 8 between Interstate 45 and Interstate 69
43	Kingwood	Northeast	East of Interstate 69 and west of Lake Houston
44	Lake Houston	Northeast	East of Interstate 69 and Beltway 8
45	Northside/Northline	North	North of Interstate 610 between Interstate 45 and Hardy Toll Road
46	Jensen	Northeast	North of Interstate 610 between Hardy Toll Road and Hirsch Road
47	East Little York/Homestead	Northeast	North of Tidwell Road and east of Hirsch Road
48	Trinity/Houston Gardens	Northeast	North of Interstate 610 between Hirsch Road and Wayside Drive
49	East Houston	Northeast	North of Highway 90 Alternate and east of East Houston Road
50	Settegast	Northeast	North of Interstate 610 between Wayside Drive and East Houston Road
51	Northside Village	North	Enclosed by Interstate 10, Interstate 45, Interstate 610, and Elysian Street
52	Kashmere Gardens	Northeast	Inside Interstate 610 west of Elysian Street and north of Liberty Road
53	El Dorado/Oates Prairie	Northeast	East of Interstate 610 between Highway 90 Alternate and Highway 90 (Crosby Freeway)
54	Hunterwood	Northeast	West of Greens Bayou and east of Highway 90
55	Greater Fifth Ward	Northeast	North of Buffalo Bayou, east of Elysian Street, south of Collingsworth Street, and west of Lockwood Drive
56	Denver Harbor/Port Houston	East	East of Lockwood Drive, south of Liberty Road, and north of Clinton Drive
57	Pleasantville Area	East	Along the western (inner) edge of Interstate 610
58	Northshore	East	North of Interstate 10, west of Interstate 610, south of Wallisville Road, and west of Greens Bayou
59	Clinton Park/Tri-Community	East	Along the eastern (outer) edge of Interstate 610 north of Buffalo Bayou and south of Interstate 10
60	Fourth Ward	West	East of Taft Street, south of Buffalo Bayou, and west of Interstate 45
61	Downtown	—	Enclosed by Interstate 45 to the south and west, Interstate 10 to the north, Interstate 69 to the east
62	Midtown	South	South of Interstate 45; north and west of Interstate 69
63	Second Ward	East	North of Harrisburg Boulevard, east of BNSF line, south of Buffalo Bayou, and west of Union Pacific line
64	Greater Eastwood	Southeast	Between Interstate 45 and Harrisburg Boulevard east of Velasco Street and west of Union Pacific line
65	Harrisburg/Manchester	Southeast	Between Brays Bayou to the west, Buffalo Bayou to the north, Sims Bayou to the east, and Texas State Highway 225 to the south
66	Museum Park (formerly Binz)	South	Between Interstate 69 and State Highway 288 north of Hermann Park
67	Greater Third Ward	South	South of Interstate 45 and east of Interstate 69
68	Greater OST/South Union	Southeast	North of Interstate 610, east of State Highway 288, south of Old Spanish Trail, and west of BNSF line
69	Gulfgate Riverview/Pine Valley	Southeast	Triangular area bound by Interstate 45, Interstate 610, and Texas State Highway 35
70	Pecan Park	Southeast	Bound by Interstate 610 to the southeast, Interstate 45 to the southwest, Griggs Road to the northwest, and Lawndale Street to the northeast
71	Sunnyside	South	East of State Highway 288 and south of Interstate 610
72	South Park	South	South of Interstate 610 and west of Mykawa Road
73	Golfcrest/Bellfort/Reveille	Southeast	Between Interstate 610 and Sims Bayou east of Mykawa Road and west of Interstate 45
74	Park Place	Southeast	Bound by Sims Bayou, Interstate 45, Interstate 610, and State Highway 225
75	Meadowbrook/Allendale	Southeast	West of South Houston and Pasadena, south of State Highway 225, east of Sims Bayou, north of Interstate 45
76	South Acres/Crestmont Park	South	East of State Highway 288 and south of Sims Bayou
77	Minnetex	South	West of Mykawa Road and north of Beltway 8
78	Greater Hobby Area	Southeast	South of Sims Bayou, east of Mykawa Road, north of Beltway 8 and Almeda Genoa Road, and west of Interstate 45
79	Edgebrook	Southeast	South of South Houston, west of Interstate 45, north and east of Shaver Street
80	South Belt/Ellington	Southeast	Large area straddling the southeastern corner of Beltway 8 south of Almeda Genoa Road and Shaver Street
81	Clear Lake	Southeast	West of Interstate 45, south of Ellington Airport, and northwest of Clear Lake
82	Magnolia Park	East	East of Union Pacific line, south and west of Buffalo Bayou, and north of Union Pacific line to Galveston
83	MacGregor	Southeast	Along Brays Bayou south of Blodgett Street, east of Almeda Road, north of Old Spanish Trail, and west of State Highway 35
84	Spring Branch North	Northwest	East of Beltway 8, south of Clay Road, west of Campbell Road, and north of Hammerly Boulevard
85	Spring Branch Central	Northwest	Between Blalock Road and Bingle Road north of Interstate 10 and south of Clay Road
86	Spring Branch East	Northwest	Enclosed by Blalock Road, Highway 290, Interstate 610, and Interstate 10
87	Greenway/Upper Kirby	Southwest	Along Interstate 69 between Bissonnet Road and Westheimer Road
88	Lawndale/Wayside	Southeast	Northeast of Interstate 45 along Brays Bayou between Union Pacific line and Griggs Road

In addition to the recognized super neighborhoods, Houston is further divided into a number of other formal and informal regions, including special districts and individual subdivisions. An incomplete list of these communities and jurisdictions is provided below.

== Management districts ==
In Texas, municipal management districts (MMDs) are independent government agencies created by the Texas Legislature to provide an additional layer of funding for infrastructure and public services in urban areas. Since the creation of the management district system in 1999, a variety of MMDs have been established in various business districts and neighborhoods across Houston; these organizations have taken visible roles in "branding" different areas of the city. Management districts are funded by ad valorem taxes on commercial properties within their boundaries.

As of 2016, there are 51 management districts in Greater Houston. An incomplete list is provided below:

Official district name	Encompassed neighborhoods	Boundaries
5 Corners District	Almeda, Fondren Gardens, Winchester	Interstate 610 to the north, Beltway 8 to the south, and Texas State Highway 288 to the east
Baybrook Management District	Baybrook Mall	Farm-to-Market Road 528 to the south, Interstate 45 to the east and north
Downtown District	Downtown	Enclosed by Interstate 45, Interstate 10, and Interstate 69 (U.S. Highway 59)
East Downtown Management District	East Downtown	East of Interstate 69 and north of Interstate 45
Generation Park Management District	Undeveloped area	Summerwood subdivision to the north, Deussen Parkway to the east, Lake Houston Parkway to the south, Beltway 8 to the west
Greater East End Management District	Eastwood, Harrisburg, Idylwood, Magnolia Park, and Pecan Park	East of the East Downtown Management District, north of Interstate 45, south of Clinton Drive, and east of Interstate 610
Greater Northside Management District	Near Northside, part of the Heights, Independence Heights, Northline	Generally east of Interstate 45 and west of Interstate 69 from Interstate 10 north to Little York Road
Houston Southeast	Third Ward, the Texas Medical Center, Riverside Terrace, South Union/OST	East of Main Street and Interstate 69, south of Interstate 45, and west of Texas State Highway 35 (Spur 5)
International Management District	Alief and Little Saigon	Westpark Tollway to the north, Beltway 8 to the east, Bissonnet Street and Bellfort Street to the south, Texas State Highway 6 to the west
Memorial Management District	Memorial City	Adjacent to Interstate 10 east of Beltway 8
Midtown Houston	Midtown	South of Interstate 45, west and north of Interstate 69
Near Northwest Management District	Greater Inwood	Tomball Parkway to the north, T. C. Jester Road to the east, Pinemont Road to the south, Hollister Road to the west
North Houston District	Greenspoint	Centered around the junction of Interstate 45 and Beltway 8
Southwest Management District	Sharpstown, Mahatma Gandhi District, portions of Chinatown	Westpark Tollway to the north, Hillcroft Road to the east, Bissonnet Street to the south, Beltway 8 to the west
Spring Branch Management District	Spring Branch	Tanner Road to the north, Hempstead Highway to the east, Interstate 10 to the south, and Beltway 8 to the west
Upper Kirby District	Upper Kirby	Westheimer Road to the north, Shepherd Drive to the east, Bissonnet Street to the south, Buffalo Speedway to the west
Uptown Houston District	Uptown Houston	Woodway Drive to the north, Interstate 610 to the east, Westpark Tollway to the south, Sage Road (approximately) to the west
Westchase District	Westchase, Alief (part)	Generally Westheimer Road to the north, Gessner Road to the east, Westpark Tollway to the south, and Wilcrest Drive to the west

== Alphabetical list of neighborhoods ==
=== A ===
- Acres Homes
- Addicks
- Afton Oaks
- Aldine
- Alief
- Almeda
- Atascocita
- Audubon Place
- Avenida Houston
- Avondale East

=== B ===
- Bay Forest
- Bay Glen
- Bay Knoll
- Barrett Station
- Bear Creek 1 & 2
- Binz
- Blue Ridge
- Bordersville
- Boulevard Oaks
- Braeburn
- Braeswood Place
- Brays Oaks
- Brentwood
- Briar Meadow
- Briargrove
- Briargrove Park
- Briarhills
- Briarmeadow
- Broadacres
- Brooke Smith
- Brookline

=== C ===
- Camden Park
- Camino South
- Camp Logan
- Candlelight Estates
- Candlelight Place
- Carverdale
- Central City
- Champion Forest
- Chasewood
- Cherryhurst
- Chevy Chase
- Chinatown
- City Park
- CityCentre
- Clear Lake City
- Clinton Park
- Cloverland
- Cole Creek Manor
- Copperfield
- Corinthian Pointe
- Cottage Grove
- Courtlandt Place
- Crestwood/Glen Cove
- Candlelight Forest West

=== D ===
- Denver Harbor
- Downtown

=== E ===
- East Downtown
- East End
- East Houston
- Eastex/Jensen
- East Little York/Homestead
- Eastwood
- Edgebrook
- El Dorado/Oates Prairie
- Eldridge/West Oaks
- Energy Corridor

=== F ===
- Fairbanks/Northwest Crossing
- Fondren Southwest
- Fifth Ward
- First Ward
- Forum Park
- Fourth Ward
- Forest West/Pinemont
- Forrest Lake
- Foster Place
- Frenchtown
- Frostwood

=== G ===
- Garden Oaks
- Garden Villas
- Gaywood
- Genoa
- Glenbrook Valley
- Glenshire
- Golfcrest
- Greenfield Village
- Greenspoint
- Greenway Plaza
- Greenwood
- Gulfgate/Pine Valley
- Gulfton
- Gulfway Terrace

=== H ===
- Harrisburg
- Heather Glen
- Herschellwood
- Hidden Valley
- Highland Village
- Hillwood
- Hiram Clarke
- Houston Gardens
- Houston Heights
- Humble
- Hunters Glen
- Hunters Point
- Hunterwood
- Hyde Park

=== I ===
- Idylwood
- Independence Heights
- International District
- Inwood Forest
- Ingrando Park

=== J ===
- Jeanetta

=== K ===
- Kashmere Gardens
- Kingwood
- Kleinbrook
- Knollwood Village

=== L ===
- Lake Houston
- Lakes of Parkway
- Lakewood
- Langwood
- Larchmont
- Lawndale/Wayside
- Lazybrook/Timbergrove
- Lindale Park
- Link Valley
- Linkwood
- Little Saigon
- Lincoln Greens
- Lower Westheimer

=== M ===
- Magnolia Grove
- Magnolia Park
- Mahatma Gandhi District
- Manchester
- Maplewood
- Maplewood South–North
- Marilyn Estates
- Meadowcreek Village
- Memorial
- Memorial Bend
- Memorial City
- Memorial Park
- Meyerland
- Midtown
- Montrose
- Moonshine Hill
- Morningside Place
- Museum District
- Museum Park
- Mykawa
- Missouri City

=== N ===
- Near Northside
- Near Northwest
- Neartown
- North Lindale
- Norhill
- North Central
- North Shore
- Northcliffe
- Northcliffe Manor
- Northfield
- Northline
- Northside
- Nottingham Forest
- Nottingham West

=== O ===
- Oak Brook
- Oak Estates
- Oak Forest
- Oak Manor–University Woods
- Old Braeswood
- Overbrook

=== P ===
- Paradise Valley
- Park Place
- Parkway Villages
- Pecan Park
- Pierce Junction
- Pine Valley
- Pleasantville
- Port Houston
- Ponderosa Forest
- Prestonwood Forest

=== R ===
- Recreation Acres
- Rice Military
- Rice Village
- Richmond Strip
- Ridgegate
- Ridgemont
- River Oaks
- Rivercrest Estates
- Riverside Terrace
- Robindell
- Royal Oaks Country Club

=== S ===
- Sagemont
- Scenic Woods
- Second Ward
- Settegast
- Shady Acres
- Shadyside
- Sharpstown
- Shenandoah
- Shepherd Park Plaza
- Sherwood Forest
- Sherwood Oaks
- Sixth Ward
- Somerset Green
- South Acres
- South Bank
- South Main
- South Park
- South Union
- Southcrest
- Southampton
- Southbelt/Ellington
- Southgate
- Southwest
- Spring Branch
- Spring Lakes
- St. George Place
- Sugar Valley
- Sunnyside
- Sunset Terrace/Montclair

=== T ===
- Tanglewood
- Tanglewilde
- Third Ward
- Timbergrove Manor
- Townhouse Manor

=== U ===
- University Oaks
- Upper Kirby
- Uptown

=== V ===
- Village at Glen Iris

=== W–Z ===
- Walnut Bend
- Washington Avenue
- Washington Terrace
- West Eleventh Place
- West End
- West Oaks
- Westbury
- Westmoreland
- Westmoreland Farms
- Westwood
- Willow Meadows
- Willowbend
- Willowbrook
- Willowick Place
- Willowood
- Windemere
- Windsor Village
- Woodland Heights
- Woodland Trails
- Woodshire
- Woodside
- Wrenwood
- Yellowstone
- Yorkshire
- Yorkwood

== See also ==
- Geographic areas of Houston
- History of Houston
- Wards of Houston
