= Braeburn (disambiguation) =

Braeburn is an apple cultivar.

Braeburn may also refer to:

== Places ==
=== United States ===
- Braeburn, Houston, a neighbourhood of Houston, Texas

=== Canada ===
- Braeburn, a locality in Saddle Hills County, Alberta
- Braeburn Lodge, Yukon

== Schools ==
- Braeburn Schools, a Kenyan company that directs a group of private schools
- Braeburn Mombasa International School, a private school in Mombasa, Kenya
- Braeburn Junior School, a school in Thistletown, a neighbourhood of Toronto, Ontario, Canada

== Others ==
- Braeburn, a character from My Little Pony: Friendship is Magic
- Braeburn Capital, a subsidiary of Apple, Inc.
