= Texas Longhorn (disambiguation) =

Texas Longhorn may refer to:

- The Texas longhorn breed of cattle.
- Someone who attends or attended University of Texas at Austin
- One of several Texas Longhorns sports teams organized at The University of Texas, or a member or coach or other person affiliated with one of those teams, or even a fan of one of those teams.
- A member or a fan of another sports team by the same name, such as the sports teams of J. Frank Dobie High School in Houston, Texas
