= Willow Wood =

Willow Wood may refer to:

- Willow Wood, Ohio, United States
- Willow Wood Subdivision, Alberta, Canada
- Willowood, Texas, United States
- The wood of a willow tree

== See also ==
- Willow (disambiguation)
