= West End Park =

West End Park may refer to:

== Ballparks ==
- Burns Park (Detroit), a former ballpark of the Detroit Tigers of the American League
- Kavanaugh Field, a former ballpark of the Little Rock Travelers of the Southern Association
- West End Park (Houston), a former ballpark of the Houston Buffaloes of the Texas League
- West End Park (Kinston, North Carolina), a former ballpark of the Kinston Indians of the Carolina League
- West End Park or Slag Pile Field, a former ballpark of the Birmingham Barons of the Southern League
- West End Park or West End Grounds, a former ballpark of the Milwaukee West Ends of the League Alliance

== Football grounds ==
- Recreation Park, Alloa, grounds of Alloa Athletic F.C. of the Scottish Championship

== Outdoor parks ==
- Kelvingrove Park, a park in Glasgow
- West End Park, a park in Flagami, Miami
- West End Park, a park in Frostburg, Maryland
- West End Park, a park in Keyser, West Virginia
- West End Park, a park in Marshall, Texas
- West End Park, a park in New Iberia, Louisiana
- West End Park, a park in West End, Atlanta
- West End Park, a park in West End, Houston
- West End Park, a park in West End, New Orleans
- West End Park, a park in West End, Roanoke, Virginia
- West End Park, a park in West End, Pittsburgh
- West End Park, a park in Wood River, Illinois
