= Idylwood =

Idylwood may refer to:

- Idylwood, Virginia, a town in Fairfax County, Virginia
- Idylwood, Houston, a neighborhood in Houston, Texas
