= Sims Bayou =

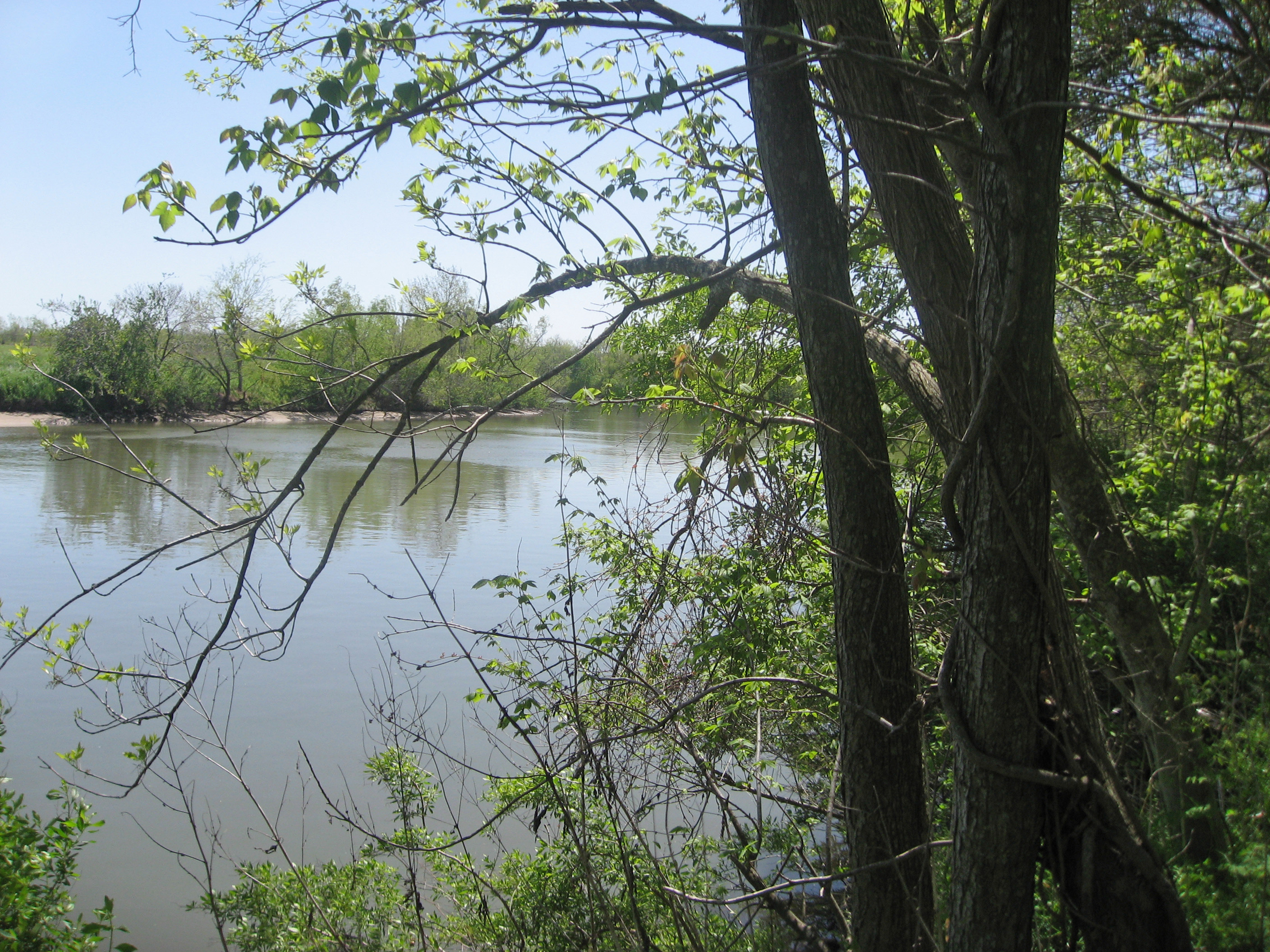
- Sims Bayou passing through Milby Park

Location
- Country: United States
- State: Texas
- County: Harris
- City: Houston

Physical characteristics
- Source
  - location: Fondren Gardens, Houston
  - coordinates: 29.625771°N 95.513866°W
- Mouth: Buffalo Bayou
  - location: Manchester, Houston
  - coordinates: 29.717984°N 95.243285°W
- Length: 23 mi (37 km)

Basin features
- Tributaries
  - right: Berry Bayou

Sims Bayou is a 23-mile (37 km) bayou that flows within Houston in a primarily west to east movement. Its origin is in Southwest Houston near Missouri City, Texas, and terminates in Manchester, Houston approximately seven miles east of Downtown Houston, where it feeds Buffalo Bayou as a major tributary. Unlike all other major Houston bayous, Sims Bayou is contained entirely within the city limits. It is a major watershed for the City of Houston.

Sims Bayou is believed to be named after Bartlett Samuel Sims—a member of the Old Three Hundred. From 1990 through 2012, the Galveston District of the United States Army Corps of Engineers performed a widening and deepening of the bayou to reduce flooding. This allowed for new development in the southern portion of the city, and removed an estimated 35,000 homes and 2,000 commercial structures from a 100-year floodplain.

In 2016 the Houston Parks Board began a project to create trails and beautify areas along Sims Bayou.

== See also ==
- Buffalo Bayou
- Houston Ship Channel
- List of rivers of Texas
