= Sagemont, Houston =

Neighborhood of Houston, Texas

Coordinates: 29.5989°N 95.2197°W

Sagemont is a neighborhood in far southeast Houston, Texas, south of Beltway 8.

The Sagemont Civic Club serves residents. According to a 2010 Houston Chronicle article, some area residents prefer Sagemont because residents do not have to pay municipal utility district (MUD) taxes as Sagemont is in the Houston city limits.

As of 2005 about 1,800 houses were in the Sagemont area. Super Neighborhood No. 80 serves Sagemont.

== History ==
Much of what is now Sagemont was previously in the land grant to the soldier Dickenson Putnam, who fought in the Texas Revolution. In 1938 C. V. Uglo acquired the land, as Putnam had received debt. In the 20th Century Ayrshire Development Corp. acquired the land, and Sagemont was built around the 1970s.

The City of Houston annexed Sagemont in 1972.

By 2005 students at Dobie High School created the website for the Sagemont Civic Club.

== Parks and recreation ==
The City of Houston operates Sagemont Park and Community Center, which has 8.3 acres (3.4 ha) of land. It includes a community center building, a swimming pool, a playground, a soccer field, a basketball pavilion, a softball diamond, and a picnic area.

The original community center building in 1970 was developed by an MUD. The city government initially was unable to operate it, so civic clubs leased the facility and operated it instead. Eventually the city government took possession of the center. The city also acquired the swimming pool, originally a private facility built by the Sagemont Recreation Club, for $65,000; the civic club gave the city government a below market rate offer. On April 19, 1982 the Houston City Council gave its approval of the acquisition, and on July 27 of that year gave the financial appropriation to convert the pool into its current use. $10,000 was earmarked for renovation and $65,467 was for the purchase. The swimming pool purchase satisfied the civic club's financial obligations.

The current 11,526-square-foot (1,070.8 m^{2}) community center building was scheduled to open on June 13, circa 2011, and was funded by a Texas Parks and Wildlife Department indoor grant worth $1 million. The previous building was demolished in 2011.

== Education ==
Residents are in the Pasadena Independent School District (PISD).

Sections north of Beamer Road and a few south of Beamer Road are zoned to James E. Stuchbery Elementary School, while most areas south of Beamer are zoned to Robert Bevis Frazier Elementary School. All areas are zoned to Morris Fifth Grade Center, Thompson Intermediate School, and J. Frank Dobie High School.

Stuchbery Elementary and Thompson Intermediate are located on a single plot of land within the community's boundaries. Frazier Elementary is on a separate parcel of land in Sagemont.

== Religion ==
The Sagemont area houses the Sagemont Church. It built a 170-foot (52 m) Christian cross at Beltway 8 at Interstate 45, the largest roadside cross in Houston. It was first established in 1966 as a mission of the Pasadena church First Baptist Church. Its current church building, 118,000 square feet (11,000 m^{2}) large, opened in 2012. This building includes a 2,496-seat sanctuary, a wing for elderly people, a wing for young people, a café, a television studio, and a bookstore. The campus altogether is 55 acres (22 ha) large. In 2012 it had 17,700 members.
