= Yellowstone, Houston =

Neighborhood in Houston, Texas

Coordinates: 29.6911°N 95.3528°W

South Union, which is located near OST/Yellowstone St., is a neighborhood located South Of Downtown Houston. It is minutes (less than 5) from Reliant Stadium and the Medical Center and conveniently located within the South 610 Loop. This segment of Houston is growing fast and land values are appreciating rapidly as the area has begun taking on a new face. New modern (2&3 Story homes) as well as traditional 1 & 2 story homes are under construction in the area.

== History ==
Housing in the area began post World War II with most of its residents middle class white Americans. In the 1950s, the local community center (Palm Center) located in Yellowstone was the first shopping mall in Houston. The mall brought growth and wealth in the area. Unfortunately in the early 1970s, Yellowstone experienced an economic downfall and as a result several stores in the mall closed that led to “White flight.” Lower income African Americans were the majority that settled in this neighborhood after the flight. This shift impacted the community tremendously leaving behind vacant homes and businesses. Since the transition, the neighborhood has remained stagnant and the economy has not recovered, thus the demographic almost remains the same. In the late 1980s the Crips gang of Los Angeles, began to move into the area. After gangs moved in, "crack houses" began to show up. HPD began to crack down on the drug dealers and gang bangers in the late 1990s. Today the neighborhood is still a predominantly African American but experiencing a fast growth in other ethnicities. As the 2010s came, investors saw a jewel in the value of this area. Many properties were purchased and the city had taken an interest to revitalize the community. Roads, transit and telecommunications were implemented along with property values appreciating by 1200%. Now, in the 2020s a vast influx of rehabbers and developers have concentrated on the location and are investing money into the community and building new homes; all while driving up the value and interest of land in this area. This area will soon be the next hot spot in Houston.

== Demographics ==
The majority of residents in Yellowstone were predominantly Black. Hispanics were the second largest ethnic group, comprising 10% of the population. Three percent of the population were of other races. Of the total population, a majority (98%) were African American 8% were foreign.

== Education ==
The community is zoned to Houston Independent School District (HISD) schools. The schools serving Yellowstone include Foster Elementary School, Cullen Middle School, and Yates High School.

== Crime ==
After the 52 Hoover Crips began to move into the area, the neighborhood hit an increase in crime. Drive-by shootings and drug activity hit a peak in the area in 1990s. In Violent Crime, 1999-2003 The annual average rate of violent crime in Yellowstone was 25.7 per 1,000 population, more than twice that of Houston. The rate of firearm-related violent crime in the community was 8.8 per 1,000 population, twice the Houston rate. Yellowstone was among those neighborhoods with the highest annual average rates of violent crime in the city.

=== 2016 Gang Injunction ===
Harris County authorities targeted Yellowstone, for a gang injunction to ban individuals allegedly associated with the Bloods, Crips and other groups who are suspected of ongoing criminal activity. A petition filed in September asked the court to prevent 92 men from entering the area – a large chunk of the 77021 ZIP code south of the Late last year, some defendants agreed not to enter certain portions of the zone and, this week, more than a dozen men were banned by "default" after not responding to the lawsuit. A hearing on the suit is scheduled in April. The effort by the Harris County District Attorney's Office and the County Attorney is designed to improve the environment for apartment complex residents, most poor and elderly, by officially prohibiting the presence of 92 people suspected of causing much of the area's crime, according to a petition and the application for permanent injunction. Certain sets and cliques were named in the lawsuit, including the Yellowstone Players, Southlawn Posse, Young Scott Block, 59 Bounty Hunters, 3rd Ward Players, Sunnyside Posse, Cuney Homes Brick Boys, Young Mob Gorillas and the Herschelwood Money Makerz. The Gang Injunciton became the county's third geographical gang injunction.
