= Willowood, Texas =

Coordinates: 29°55′14″N 95°30′19″W

Willowood is a subdivision found in unincorporated Harris County, Texas, United States in the Northwest Park area next to State Highway 249, and Beltway 8 and south of the Willowbrook area of Houston, west of Inwood Forest in Houston, and north of Acres Homes in Houston. The main road for the subdivision is North Houston Roselyn Drive.

== Government and infrastructure ==
Klein is within Harris County Precinct 4. As of 2008 Jerry Eversole heads the precinct.

The community is served by the Harris County Sheriff's Office District I Patrol, headquartered from the Cypresswood Substation at 6831 Cypresswood Drive. The area is served by the Northwest Volunteer Fire Department.

== Education ==
Students in Willowood are zoned to the Klein Independent School District. The zoned schools are Epps Island Elementary School, Klein Intermediate School, and Klein Forest High School.

== See also ==
http://willowoodnews.com/
