= Pine Valley, Houston =

Neighborhood in Houston, Texas

Coordinates: 29.7085°N 95.3181°W

Pine Valley is a neighborhood in Houston, Texas, located at the crossing of I-45 and the 610 South Loop and ends at Long Drive. It is the 3rd Biggest Super-Neighborhood Of Southeast Houston. It is divided into two territories by a railroad located at Griggs St.

Pine Valley is a neighborhood that is part of the Gulfgate Riverview/Pine Valley Superneighborhood, otherwise known as Superneighborhood 69.
