= Willowick Place, Houston =

Coordinates: 29.7492°N 95.4401°W

Willowick Place at River Oaks was a proposed gated community in Houston, Texas, United States. The neighborhood would have been close to the River Oaks subdivision.

Looney Ricks Kiss, a Memphis, Tennessee architecture and planning firm designed the community. McCord Development, a Houston real estate firm, owns the land which Willowick Place will occupy. McCord bought the Willowick Court Townhomes, a 171-unit 1970s-era multi-family complex located at 3237 Las Palmas Drive. McCord planned to develop Willowick Place on the former Willowick Court site.

The community was supposed to consist of 62 houses in a 11.3-acre (46,000 m^{2}) area. The community was to be bounded by Las Palmas Street, West Alabama Street, Weslayan Street and West Main Street. The house prices will range from $2.5 million to $5 million U.S. dollars. The lots were priced from $900,000 to $2 million. The Houston City Council approved the closure of Las Palmas Street between West Main and West Alabama to prepare for the construction of Willowick Place. The homeowners association was to maintain green spaces and gardens. Ryan McCord, the executive vice president of McCord Development, said that he chose to develop a single-family complex because focus groups and market studies indicated a demand for smaller single-family housing for wealthy Houstonians who wanted to downsize yet did not want to abandon the idea of living in a single-family house.

Hurricane Ike came to Houston in September 2008; the hurricane did not damage the trees within the planned subdivision. In an October 24, 2008 Houston Business Journal article, McCord said that he was glad that the trees did not sustain damage, as 25% of the home sites had been reserved. The developers said the canopy formed by the trees, around 40 years old as of 2008, formed the inspiration for the subdivision.

In 2009 the owner of the Willowick Court Townhomes canceled the plans to convert the property into home sites, saying that the current economic climate was not feasible.
