= Bay Glen, Houston =

Coordinates: 29.58°N 95.14°W

Bay Glen
- Neighborhood
- Interactive map of Bay Glen
- Country: United States
- State: Texas
- Cities: Houston, Harris
- Website: http://bayglen.clearlakecity.com/

Bay Glen is a neighborhood located within the master-planned community of Clear Lake City in Houston, Texas. The neighborhood was developed in the mid-1980s and borders the neighborhoods of Bay Knoll, Bay Pointe, Bay Oaks, Northfork and Oak Brook West. Bay Glen, along with Bay Knoll, is a member of the Pineloch Community Association.

Residents living in Bay Glen take advantage of all the amenities offered with the master-planned community of Clear Lake City—such as community parks, swimming pools, and tennis courts.

== Police service ==
Houston Police Department's Clear Lake Patrol Division serves the area.

== Education ==
Bay Glen is served by the Clear Creek Independent School District and students attend John F. Ward Elementary, Clear Lake Intermediate, and Clear Brook High School. Despite being located in Houston, it is not served by the Houston Independent School District.
