= Washington Avenue (Houston, Texas) =

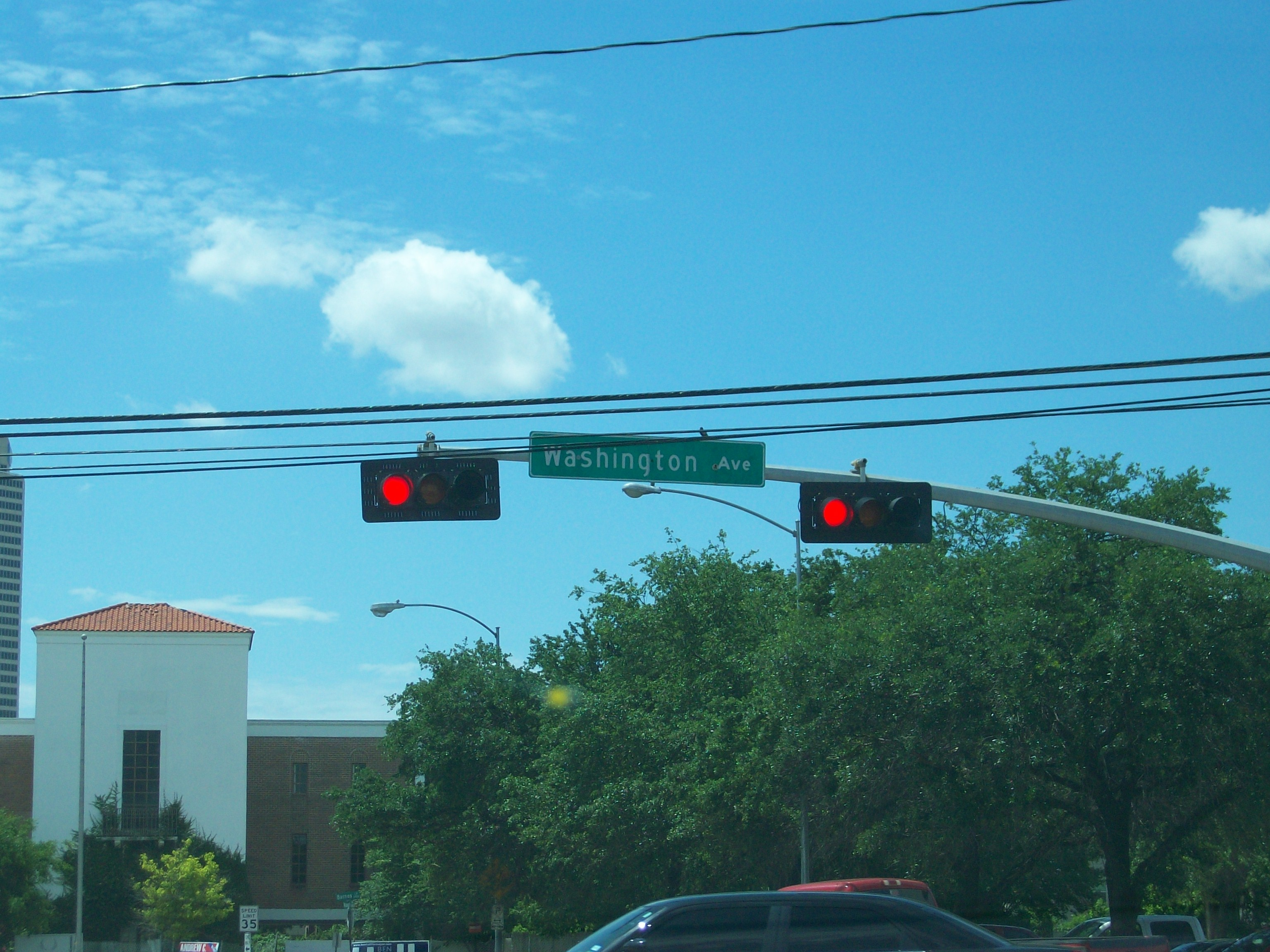
- Washington Avenue at Studemont
- Interactive map of Washington Avenue
- Length: 4.5 mi (7.2 km)
- Location: Harris County, Texas
- Coordinates: 29.7689°N 95.3918°W
- West end: Hempstead Road
- Major junctions: I-10
- East end: I-45

Washington Avenue is a road in Houston, Texas, United States. It is named for Washington County, as it is part of the original route from Houston to Brenham, the seat of Washington County.

U.S. Highway 90 was routed along Washington Avenue prior to the opening of the Katy Freeway.

Ralph Bivins stated in a newspaper article published by the Chicago Tribune that decades before 1995 the area along Washington Avenue was a "major corridor of commerce" as people used the road to travel between Downtown Houston, the Sixth Ward, and the Houston Heights. Bivins described Washington Avenue in 1995 as a "decrepit" road with used car lots, "boarded-up" buildings, and second-hand stores. Around 2009 the area around the road gentrified and gained a "Yuppie" population.

== Entertainment district ==
Around 2009 the area became a popular entertainment area due to its location near Downtown Houston and the Houston Heights, a community within Houston that forbids the sale of alcohol within its boundaries. By May 2009, the Washington Avenue area gained expensive town houses and condominiums, restaurants, and bars. John Nova Lomax of the Houston Press argues that the spread-out nature of Washington Avenue could cause issues that lead to the decline of the Richmond Strip, a popular party-going district in the 1990s. To alleviate the issue, the clubs on Washington Avenue added jitneys and similar tools to ferry people between clubs.

Craig Hlavaty said "Most Houstonians look at Washington as a destination for Outer Loopers (people living outside of the 610 Loop) hoping to live out a club-life fantasy. For suburbanites, the bottle service, flashing lights, valets, dress codes, long lines and discriminating bouncers are more inviting than off-putting" while "For a seasoned Inner Looper (a person who lives within the 610 Loop), though, one step into Blue Label Lounge or Reign is enough to beat a hasty retreat to Domy Books. The seizure-inducing lighting, random Asian businessmen, pukey-faced girls, fire-breathing bartenders, dancing lingerie models and bachelorette parties chugging bottles of Grey Goose give these clubs a larger-than-life cartoon quality that beats anything on an MTV reality show."

In 2012, Katharine Shilcutt of the Houston Press said that the entertainment "scene" began moving to Midtown and the East End. As a result, many restaurants in the corridor began to increase the quality of the food and many of the clubs had closed. Shilcutt argued that it was more likely that Washington Avenue would become a restaurant-focused area than become a decrepit area like the Richmond Strip.

In his 2010 article, Hlavaty said that Washington Avenue's main area extended for 3 miles (4.8 km), from TC Jester to Houston Avenue, "plus one block (give or take) to the north and south." In her 2012 article, Shilcutt defined the club district as on Washington Avenue, between Studemont Street and Westcott Street; she said this was because the area east of Studemont is the Old Sixth Ward and the area west of Westcott is Rice Military. The Rice Military Civic Club defines Westcott as its western boundary.

In December 2012 administrators of the city government planned to seek approval to install parking meters along the corridor.

== Gallery ==
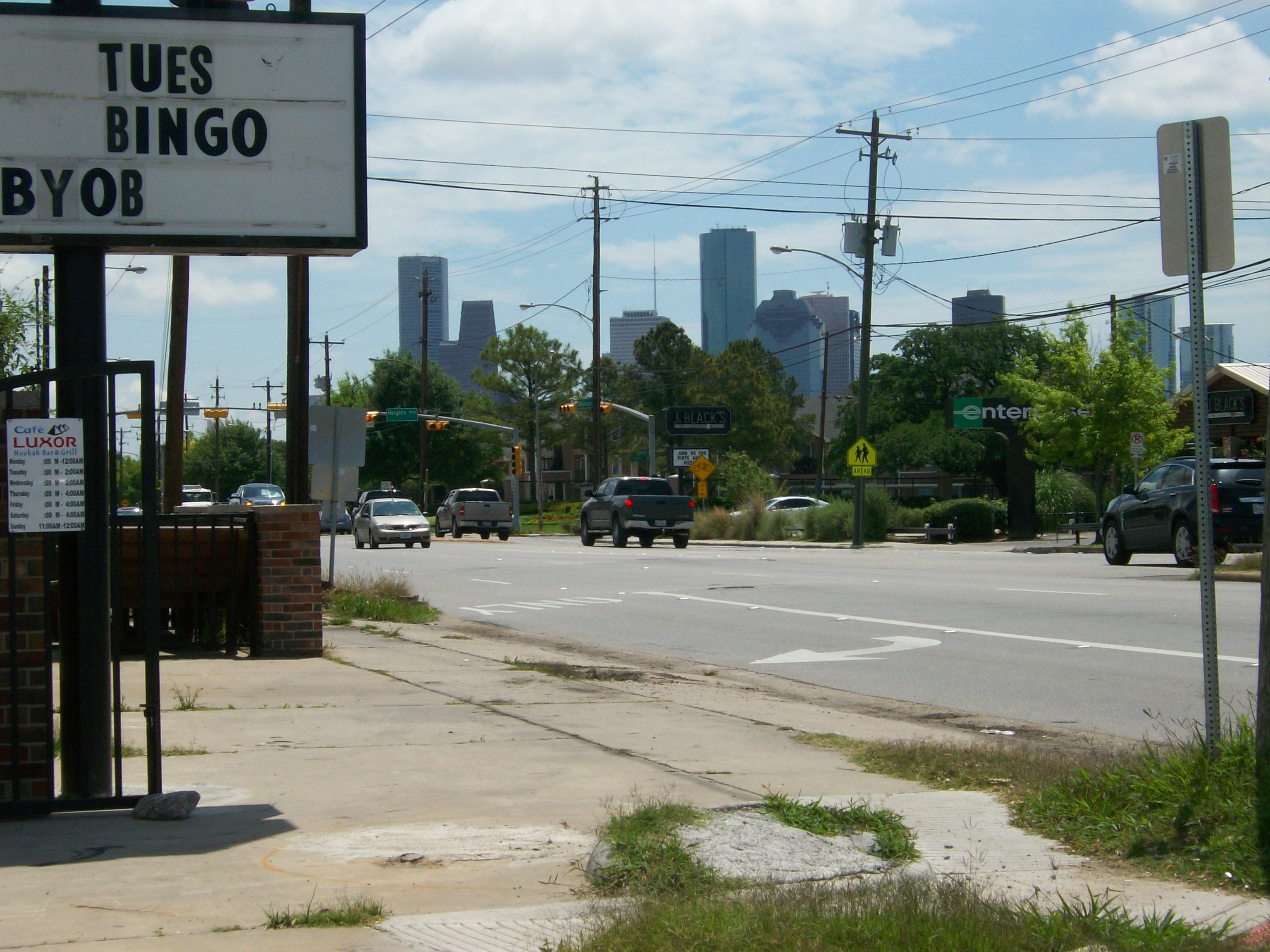
Washington Avenue at Yale St., looking east (Houston, TX)

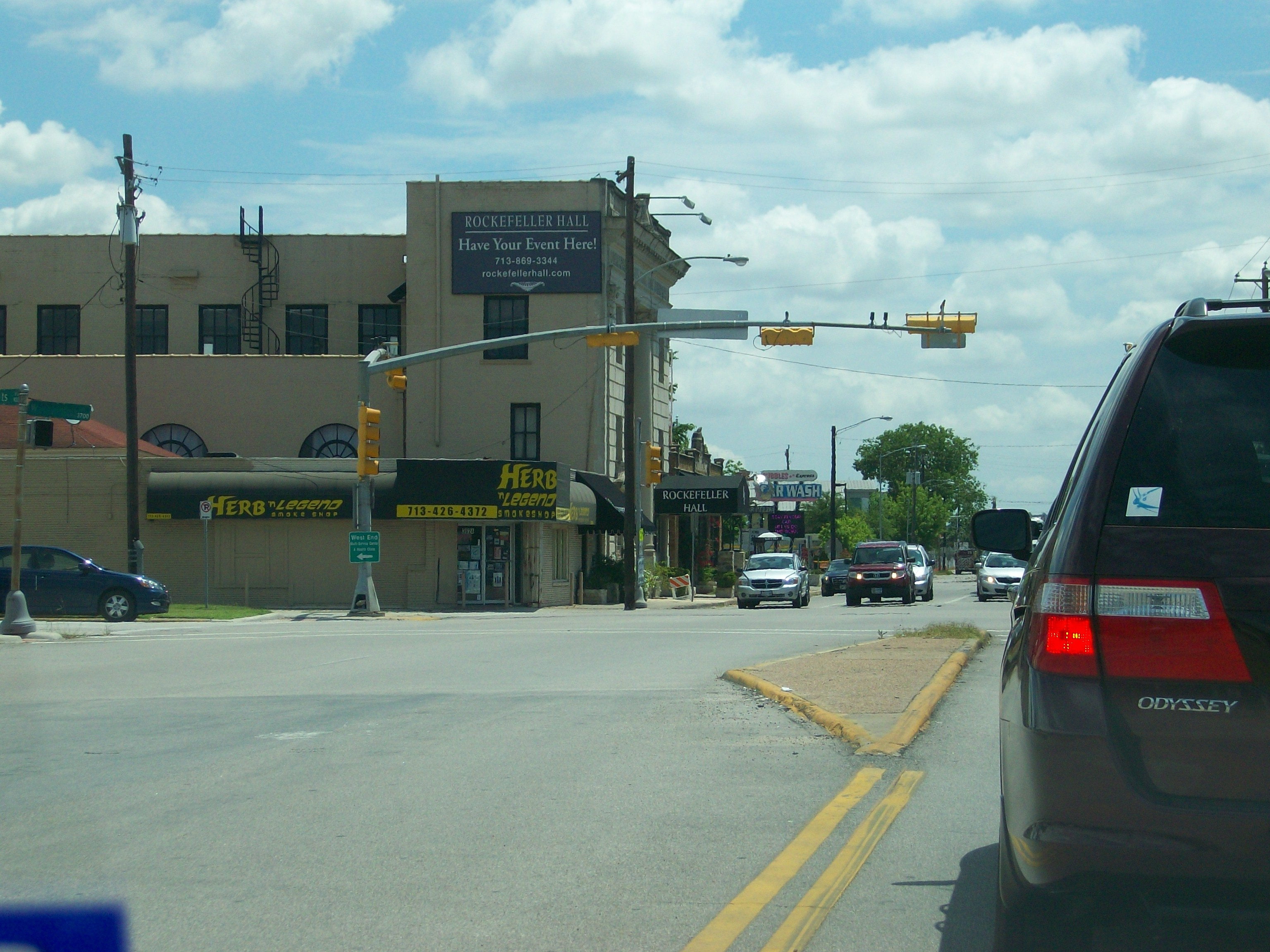
Washington Avenue at Heights Blvd., looking east (Houston, TX)

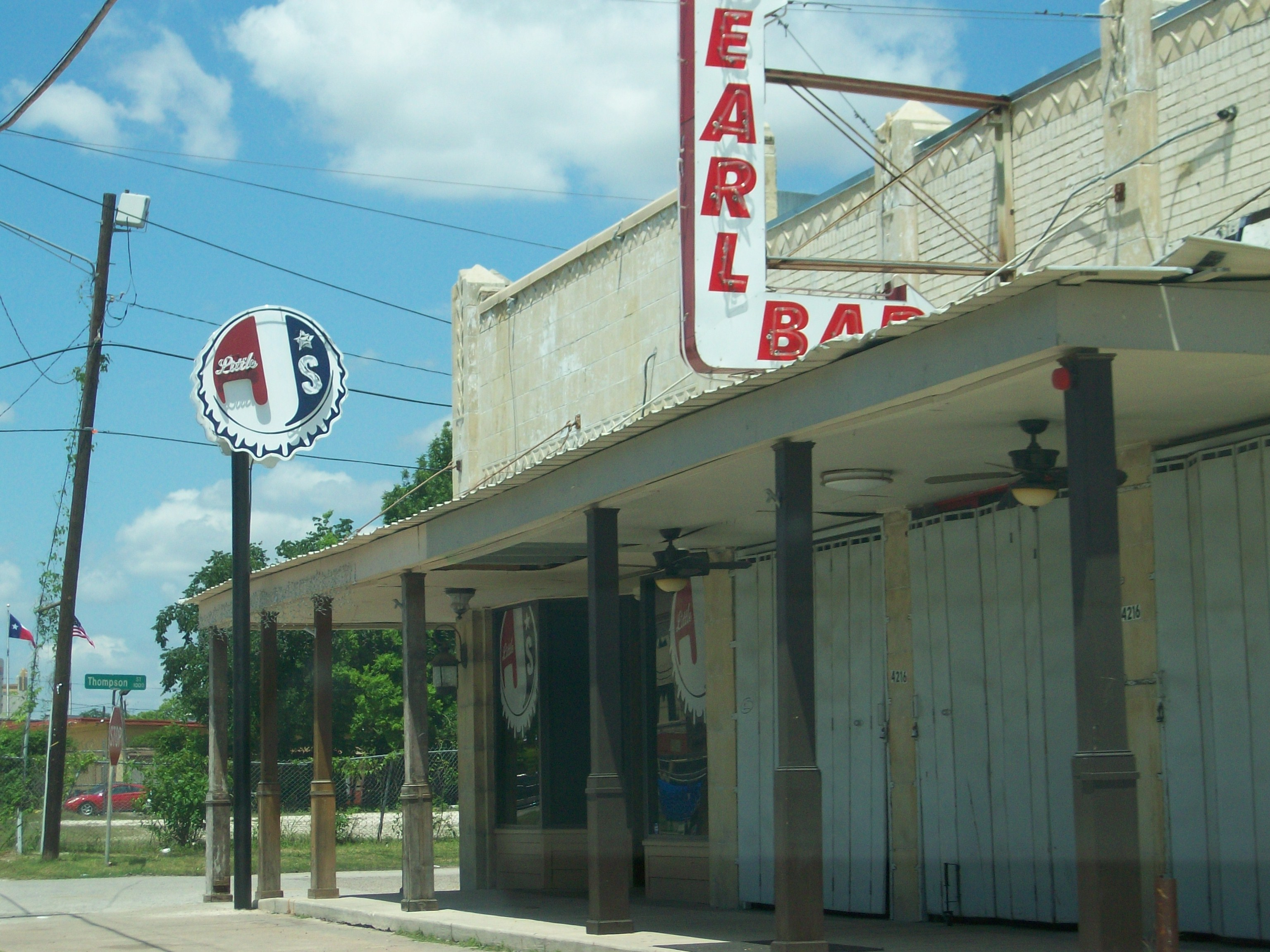
Pearl Bar on Washington Avenue (Houston, TX)

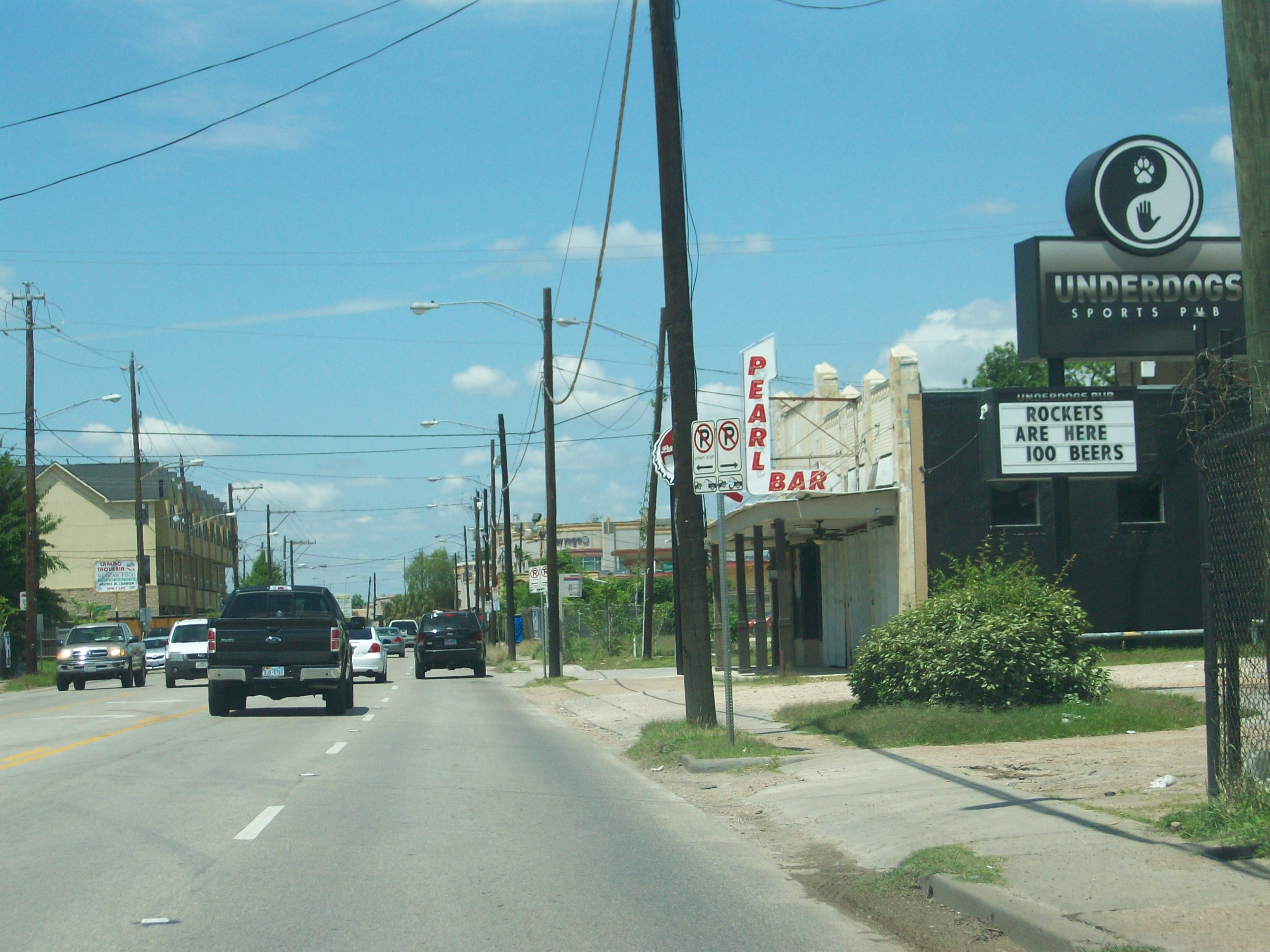
Washington Avenue (Houston, TX) near Pearl Bar

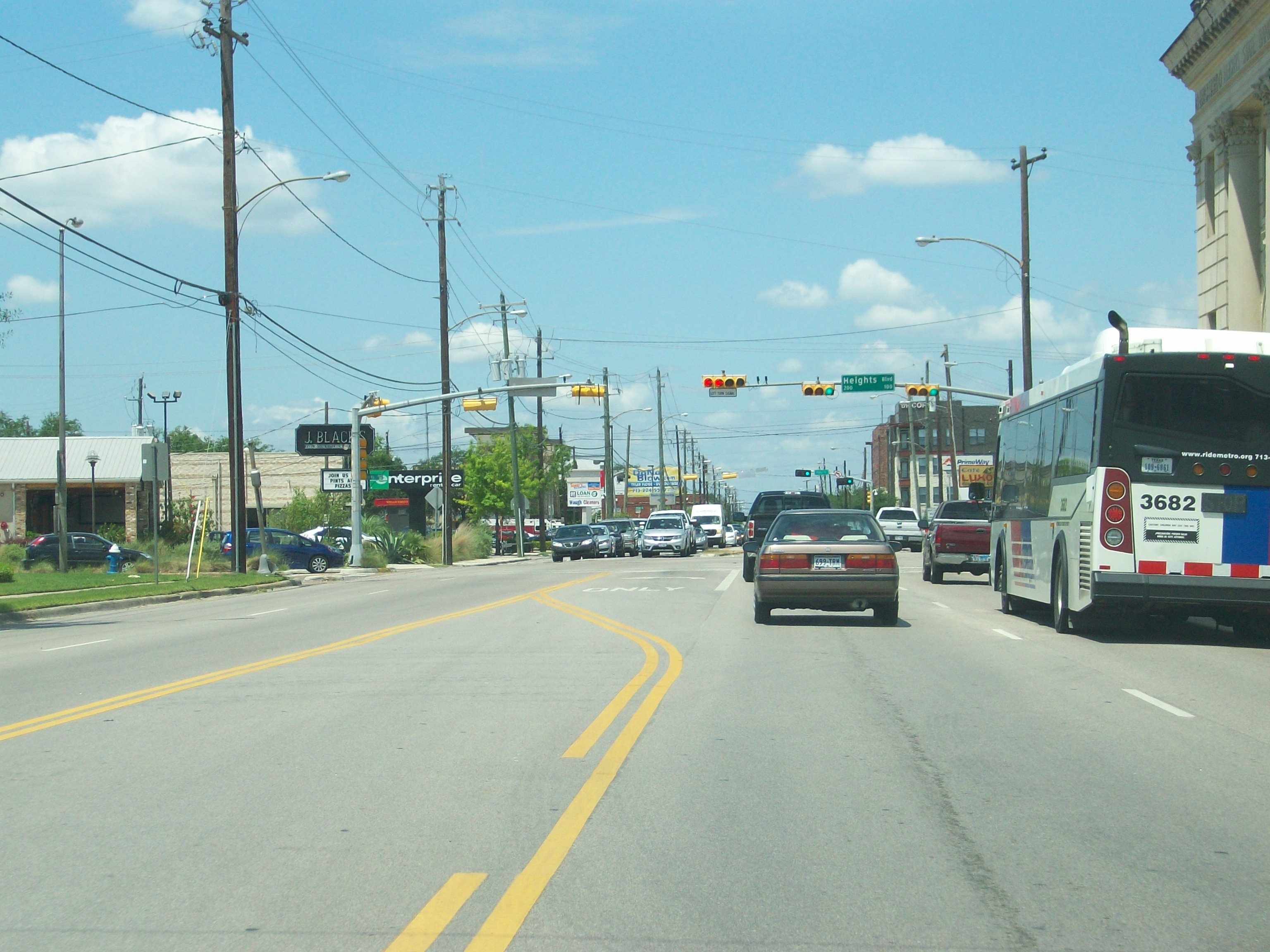
Washington Avenue (Houston, TX) heading west

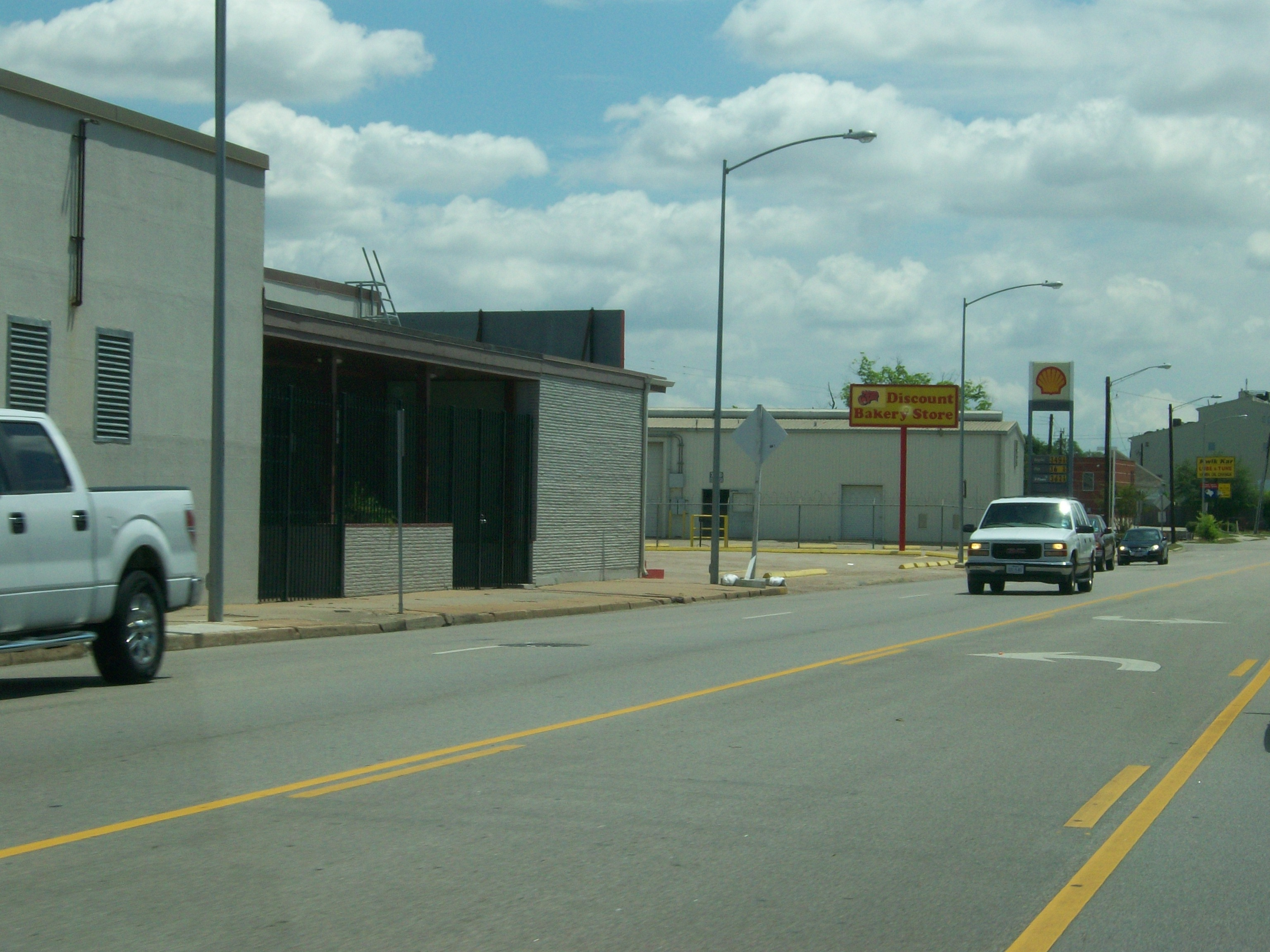
Washington Avenue (Houston, TX) near bakery

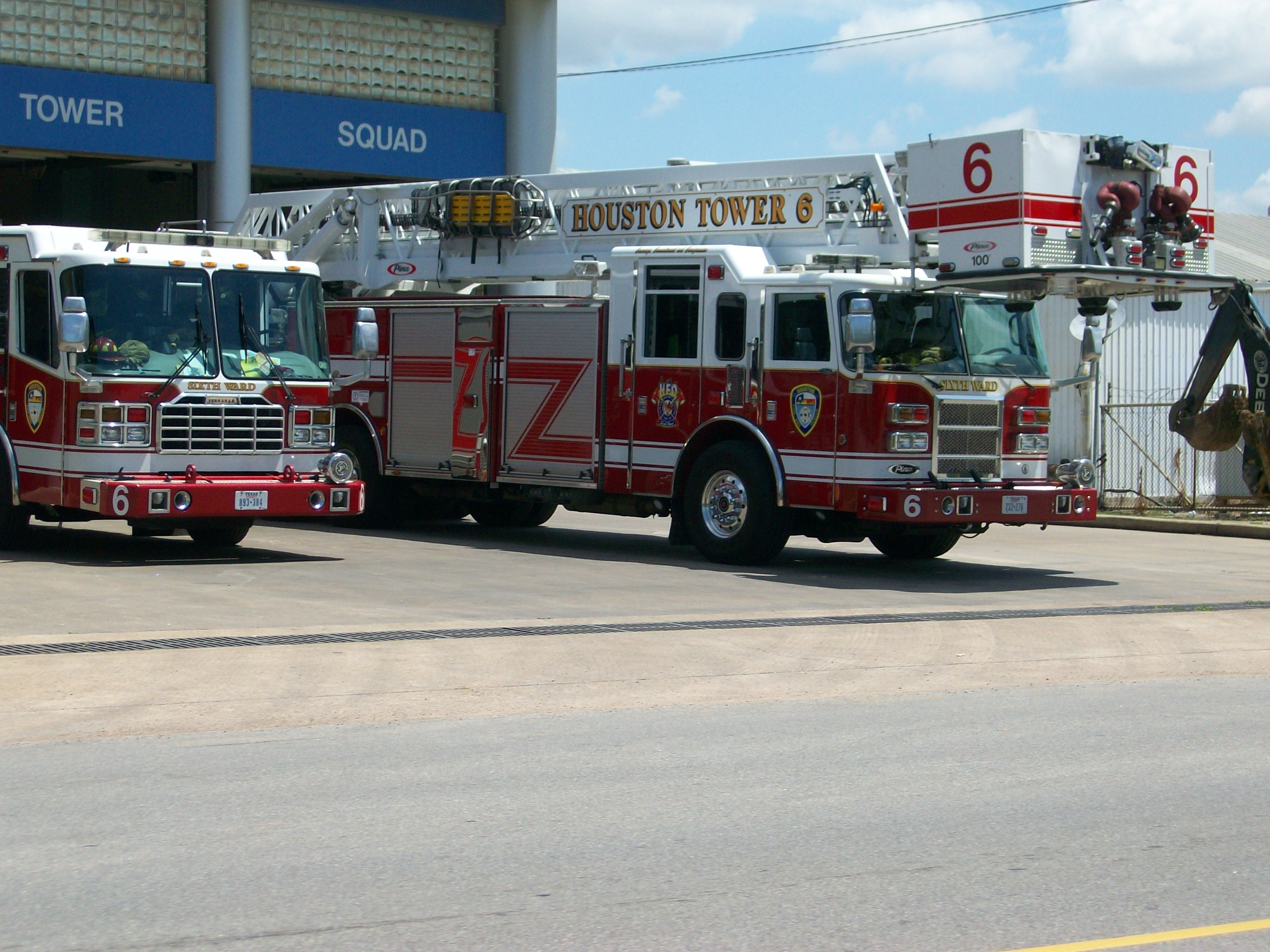
Washington Avenue (Houston, TX) fire station number 6

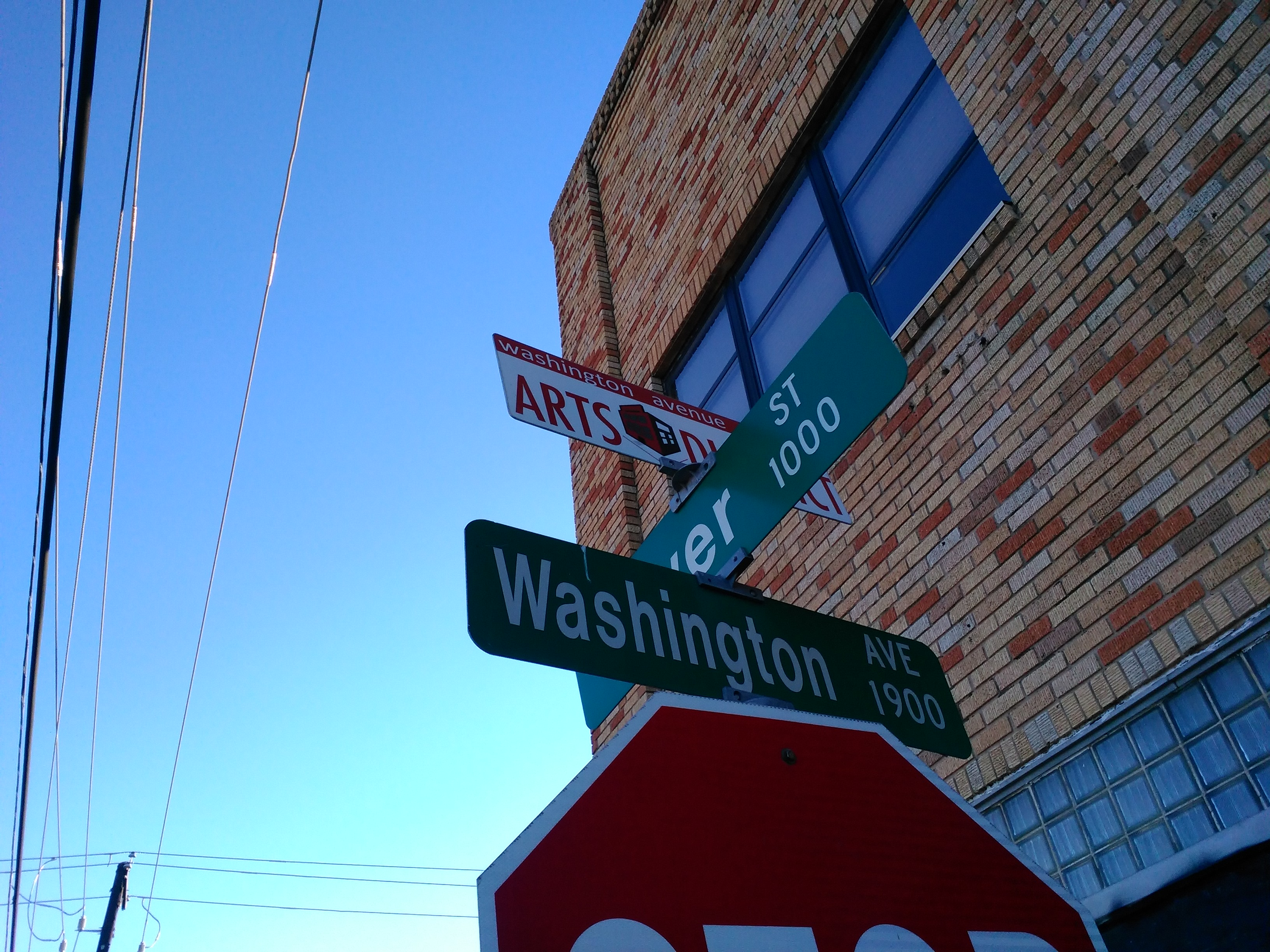
Washington Avenue Corridor Arts District street sign

== See also ==
- Richmond Strip
