= Greenfield Village (Houston) =

Neighborhood in Houston, Texas, US

Coordinates: 29°56′53″N 95°28′33″W

Greenfield Village a small residential subdivision in northwest Harris County just outside of the city limits of Houston, Texas. It is located off Veterans Memorial Drive, West Greens Road serves as its main road. The zip code for the neighborhood is 77066. It is bordered on the east by commercial plazas off Veterans Memorial, on the south by West Greens Road and Greens Bayou, to the west and north by an unnamed tributary to Greens Bayou. The neighborhood is in Aldine ISD and is zoned to Conley Elementary, Wilson Intermediate, Plummer Middle School, and Davis High School. The neighborhood is primarily black and there are 558 single-family homes.
