= Dobie High School =

J Frank Dobie High School
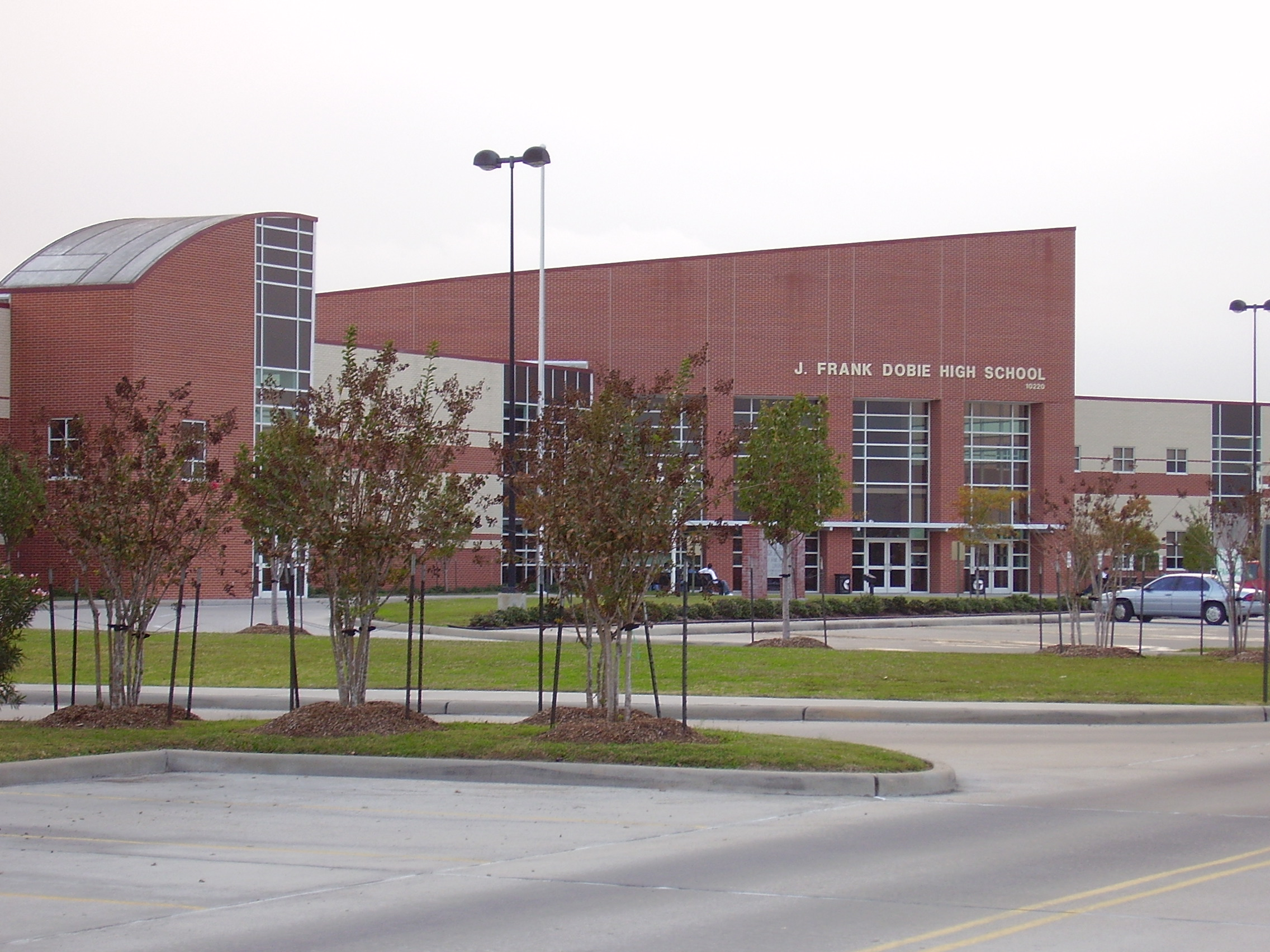

Location
- 10220 Blackhawk Blvd., Houston, Texas 77089; Houston; United States; 29.5918°N 95.2498°W

Information
- Type: Public high school
- Established: 1968; 58 years ago
- School district: Pasadena Independent School District (PISD)
- Superintendent: Dr. DeeAnn Powell
- Principal: Jorly Thomas
- Teaching staff: 235.71 (FTE)
- Grades: 9-12
- Enrollment: 3,739 (2023-2024)
- Student to teacher ratio: 15.86
- Colors: Orange and white
- Team name: Longhorns
- Feeder schools: Beverly Hills Intermediate, Thompson Intermediate
- Website: dobie.pasadenaisd.org

J. Frank Dobie High School is a public secondary school located in Houston, Texas. Founded in 1968, it is named after the Texas writer of the same name. It houses grades 10-12. A Ninth Grade Center was opened recently to help with the influx of students. It is the largest school in the Pasadena Independent School District. The school mascots are the Longhorns and the official colors are orange and black, similar to that of the University of Texas at Austin.

Dobie High School was originally located at 11111 Beamer Rd. However, overcrowding problems at the Beamer campus and the rapidly growing population in the South Belt area led city officials and voters to pass a $199.05 million bond in February 2000. This included a new 490,000-square-foot (46,000 m^{2}) location to be built at 10220 Blackhawk Blvd which opened in 2003.

The original Beamer location is now occupied by Beverly Hills Intermediate School.

== History ==
In 2014, PISD announced plans to create a 9th grade center in order to reduce overcrowding at Dobie High. In 2015, the district revealed the design plans for the 9th grade center, and groundbreaking occurred in August 2016. The Dobie Ninth Grade campus opened its doors on January 9, 2018 and a dedication ceremony was held on December 6, 2018.

== Athletics ==
Athletics offered at Dobie High School include:

- Athletic trainers
- Baseball
- Basketball
- Bowling
- Cheerleaders
- Cross Country
- Football
- Golf
- Power Lifting
- Soccer
- Softball
- Swimming
- Tennis
- Track
- Volleyball

== Academic Decathlon ==
Dobie High School's Academic Decathlon teams took home the national championship in 1992 and 1996, and second in the nation in 2011.

== Speech and Debate ==
Students from the school have been successful in the National Speech and Debate Association Tournaments.

== Standardized dress ==
In 2011 Dobie High School had a standardized dress code and students are required to wear identification badges above the waist on a lanyard on campus.

The Texas Education Agency specified that the parents or guardians of students zoned to a school with uniforms may apply for a waiver to opt out of the uniform policy so their children do not have to wear the uniform; parents must specify "bona fide" reasons, such as religious reasons or philosophical objections.

== Feeder schools and neighborhoods served by Dobie High School ==
Beverly Hills Intermediate and Thompson Intermediate are the two feeder schools for Dobie High School.

The school serves portions of Houston in the South Belt/Ellington area (including Riverstone Ranch, and Sagemont.) and portions of Pearland. Dobie High School also zones portions of Southeast Houston (Bridge Gate).

== Notable alumni ==
- Gawain Guy - 1981 graduate; participant in the 1984 Summer Olympics for Jamaica
- Ken Howery - 1993 graduate; Stanford graduate, co-founder of PayPal and co-founder of The Founders Fund
- Christa Lee Williams - 1996 graduate; gold medalist at the 1996 and 2000 Summer Olympics (softball)
- Lionel Dotson - NFL player, free agent having played for the Miami Dolphins, Buffalo Bills, and Denver Broncos.
- Gerald Green - transferred; professional basketball player in the NBA
- Karima Christmas-Kelly - 2007 graduate; professional basketball player for the WNBA's Indiana Fever, 2012 WNBA Champions
- Blake Jackson - 2012 graduate; Wide Receiver for the Cleveland Browns
- Johnathan Baldwin - 2021 graduate; Safety for the Green Bay Packers
