= Richmond Strip =

Entertainment district in Houston, Texas

The Richmond Avenue Entertainment District, commonly known as the Richmond Strip, is an entertainment district along Richmond Avenue in western/southwestern Houston, Texas. It was especially popular in the 1990s, but it later declined as a partygoing destination in favor of other areas of town, such as Washington Avenue. Erin Mulvaney of the Houston Chronicle stated that at its peak, it was "seen as the Houston's answer to Sixth Street, Beale Street and Bourbon Street."

== History ==
Marty Racine of the Houston Chronicle said "At the dawn of the '90s, geographically dysfunctional Houston lacked anything resembling an "entertainment district." Originally the Richmond Strip housed a few pool halls. After large chain establishments such as Billy Blues, Dave & Buster's, and Fat Tuesday moved into the area, bars began to appear there. Chuy's, Joe's Crab Shack, and Taco Cabana opened their first Houston locations in the Richmond Strip.

In 1993 Brad Tyer of the Houston Press said "The Richmond Strip has developed over the course of the past decade into a true entertainment district, a place to be and be seen, Houston's urban-sprawl equivalent of Sixth Street in Austin or Beale Street in Memphis or New Orleans' Latin Quarter — part local destination and part tourist trap, offering sensory overload in exchange for dollars." In 1995 Racine said "Elsewhere, Kirby Drive and especially Richmond Avenue are examples of strips where a bandwagon effect has spurred the proliferation of restaurants and clubs." In 1994 Greg Hassell of the Houston Chronicle said that the Richmond Strip was "the city's party strip." By 1997, the Richmond Strip became well known as a party destination in smaller communities outside of the Houston area. Jene Harper, the president of the Larchmont Civic Association, said "But I'll go out of town and people say, 'oh, the Richmond Strip. I know where that is. It's where all the bars are.' In the small towns, El Campo, Sealy and all that, it's, 'Oh, you're from Houston. You ever go to City Streets? Yeah.' They drive in all the way to go to City Streets."

By 1995 residents of some surrounding residential communities, such as Glenhaven Estates, Lamar Terrace, and Larchmont, began asking for improved noise ordinances; the noise ordinances had been revamped two years before. The clubs opposed the proposed noise ordinances. In 1997 Hobart Rowland of the Houston Press said that the Richmond Strip was "the city's most successful and flashy entertainment drag." At that time, the company Dennis Lange Promotions had an overwhelming majority of the live music setup business in the Richmond Strip. The company had exclusive arrangements with 45 Richmond Strip clubs, and the company gave occasional business to an additional 50 to 100 businesses. By November 1997, residents of surrounding neighborhoods continued protesting the strip. Some of the major businesses of the strip had gone out of business. The Richmond Area Management District had been created during the final Texas Legislature session before November 16, 1997. The Richmond Avenue Merchants Association (RAMA) had promoted the creation of the management district. Harper argued that the existence of the Richmond Strip was necessary. She said "As far as bringing conventions and other things, there needs to be an entertainment district and, right now, Richmond is the district. There's not one downtown like Dallas. You don't have a West End. There's no Deep Ellum."

=== Decline and change ===
Mike McGuff of KIAH-TV said "But things cooled off by the late 1990s. You probably also heard reports of shootings and other crime in the area that didn't help matters." By 2003, crime had been increasing in the Richmond Strip.

By 2008, the party scene had declined, with the new areas of the Greater Houston club scene being Downtown Houston, Midtown Houston, and Washington Avenue. As of 2008, 1990s music plays in many area clubs, and many establishments use "z" in place of "s", such as "Dreamz" instead of "Dreams." John Nova Lomax of the Houston Press said "It’s a life of, as Wash Allen from KCOH would put it, 'dealing with' strippers, or dealing with the kind of guys who are attracted to dealing with that sort of thing. As a philosophy. It’s full of apartment poolside parties, bad cocaine, the occasional dose of clap, tanning bedz [sic], jello shotz [sic], big ass beerz [sic], and cold Jager machinez [sic]." Lomax concluded "And it seems that Houston no longer really wants the Richmond Strip. Sure, a few holdovers from the glory days remain, such as the Sam’s Boat empire, Centerfolds, La Bare (where “Cannon” from New Orleans is scheduled to appear), Dave and Buster’s and so on, but you think that all of these place would leap at any favorable lease they could get inside the loop." In 2010 Craig Hlavaty, Shea Serrano, and Mike Giglio of the Houston Press said that the Richmond Strip was "Houston's last real nightclub row" before the emergence of Washington Avenue.

In 2010 some club owners in the area said that the Richmond Strip is rising as an entertainment destination; they cited the opening of Scott Gertner's Sports Bar Live. David Gertner, the father of Scott Gertner, owner of Sports Bar Live, said that geography was favorable. McGuff also said that many Houstonians had a nostalgia for the Richmond Strip.

There was a 2015 community meeting to discuss how to redevelop the Richmond Strip that was attended by urban planners, landscape architects, and real estate figures.

== Cityscape ==
The Richmond Strip is in western/southwestern Houston. Residential areas are not located directly on the strip.

Brad Tyer of the Houston Press said in 1993 that the Richmond Strip is bordered by Hillcroft Avenue to the west and Chimney Rock Road to the east. John Nova Lomax said in 2003 that it extends "from Sage or Chimney Rock to Hillcroft, or Fondren, or Gessner, or wherever it finally peters out into a ramshackle succession of car repair shops and tire barns out by Beltway 8." In 2015 Mulvaney stated that it was bounded by Chimney Rock, Westheimer Road, Hillcroft Street, and Westpark Drive.

The district has very large bars and clubs; some have over 50,000 square feet (4,600 m^{2}) of space. Lomax said that Richmond Strip establishments were "spread out and huge," while most entertainment districts were "cozy and pedestrian," therefore "The Richmond Strip is a very Houstonian take on the concept of an entertainment district." The Richmond Strip was not designed as a walkable environment; bars and clubs may be separated by long distances ranging from hundreds and thousand feet, to even 1 mile (1.6 km). Patrons were expected to drive to the area and drive to all area accommodations. Lomax said "The strip is designed so that you park and get out at one bar, or get the valet to do it for you, and do so again and again as the night wears on." In 1994 Greg Hassell of the Houston Chronicle said that there were few old buildings in the Richmond Strip area.

John Nova Lomax of the Houston Press, as paraphrased by Mike McGuff of KIAH-TV, said that "a major problem with the area was the fact clubs were scattered down a long stretch of road and mixed in with non-entertainment businesses. That made it hard for folks to walk, especially after a few cold ones. It's also clear that having fun and traffic don't mix." David Gertner, the father of Scott Gertner, owner of Scott Gertner's Sports Bar Live, expressed a belief that the geography of the Richmond Strip was favorable for the area coming back; he said "Don't forget it is very convenient for all parts of the city and it's right off the freeway which makes it very good."

== Demographics of business patrons ==
As of 2001 the majority of clubgoers in the Richmond Strip were white.

== Culture ==
As of 1997 each year the St. Patrick's Day parade and the "Hou-Dah" parade occurred at the Richmond Strip and RAMA sponsored them. The Hou-Dah parade moved its street celebration to the Richmond Strip in 1995. Previously the Hou-Dah parade was held during the Mardi Gras parade in Galveston.

== Crime ==
In the 1990s, on Spring Break about 40 to 50 police officers patrolled the Richmond Strip as part of the Joint Richmond Club District Spring Break Initiative. The police also organized the Richmond Avenue traffic initiative, a patrol which occurred on Saturday nights.

Lt. Doug Perry of the Houston Police Department (HPD) said that after 1996, crime on the Richmond Strip had decreased 90% after he installed a program to increase the presence of police officers and divert traffic. Sgt. Michael P. Kelly of the HPD Westside Division said in 2000 that every Saturday night on the Richmond strip, one shooting, stabbing, or killing occurred. In 2001 Lt. S.K. Boyce of the Houston Police Department said that there were more arrests occurring along the Richmond Strip than along Martin Luther King Boulevard in South Park, where a 10-block cruising scene occurred habitually on Sunday evenings. Boyce said that of those arrested on the Richmond Strip, most were white.

By 2003, crime had been increasing along the Strip. From January 2003 to May 2003, 107 robberies, 73 aggravated assaults, 10 shootings, five rapes, several attempted vehicular homicides, and several successful vehicular homicides. In almost all of the violent crimes reported on the Richmond Strip, automobiles were a key aspect, while guns were not always a key aspect. John Nova Lomax of the Houston Press said "In other words, guns don't kill people, but people who keep guns in their cars kill people." William Martin, a sociologist from Rice University, said that he suspected that many of the perpetrators had consumed alcohol. By June 2003 multiple violent crimes had occurred in the Richmond Strip. Around July 2003, shootings occurred in three weekends in a row. This caused the HPD Westside Division to more strictly enforce laws against illegal U-turns at the intersection of Hillcroft Road and the 6300 and 6400 blocks of Richmond. In the year leading up to July 28, 2003, nine people were injured and five people were killed in violent attacks in the Richmond Strip. In 2011 Richard Connelly of the Houston Press said that the Richmond Strip was "not generally known for outright murder."

== See also ==
- Deep Ellum
- Washington Avenue (Houston, Texas)
