= Bay Knoll, Houston =

Neighborhood in Houston, Texas

Coordinates: 29.576°N 95.146°W

Bay Knoll is a neighborhood located within the master-planned community of Clear Lake City in Houston, Texas, USA. The neighborhood was developed in the mid-1980 and borders the neighborhoods of Bay Glen, Bay Pointe, Bay Oaks, Meadowgreen, and Oak Brook West. Bay Knoll, along with Bay Glen, is a member of the Pineloch Community Association.

Residents living in Bay Knoll take advantage of all the amenities offered with the master-planned community of Clear Lake City—such as community parks, swimming pools, and tennis courts.

== Police service ==
Houston Police Department's Clear Lake Patrol Division serves the area.

== Education ==
Bay Knoll is served by the Clear Creek Independent School District and students living in Bay Knoll attend John F. Ward Elementary, Clear Lake Intermediate, and Clear Brook High School. Despite being located in Houston, it is not served by the Houston Independent School District.
