= Southbelt/Ellington, Houston =

Neighborhood in Houston, Texas

Coordinates: 29.601°N 95.205°W

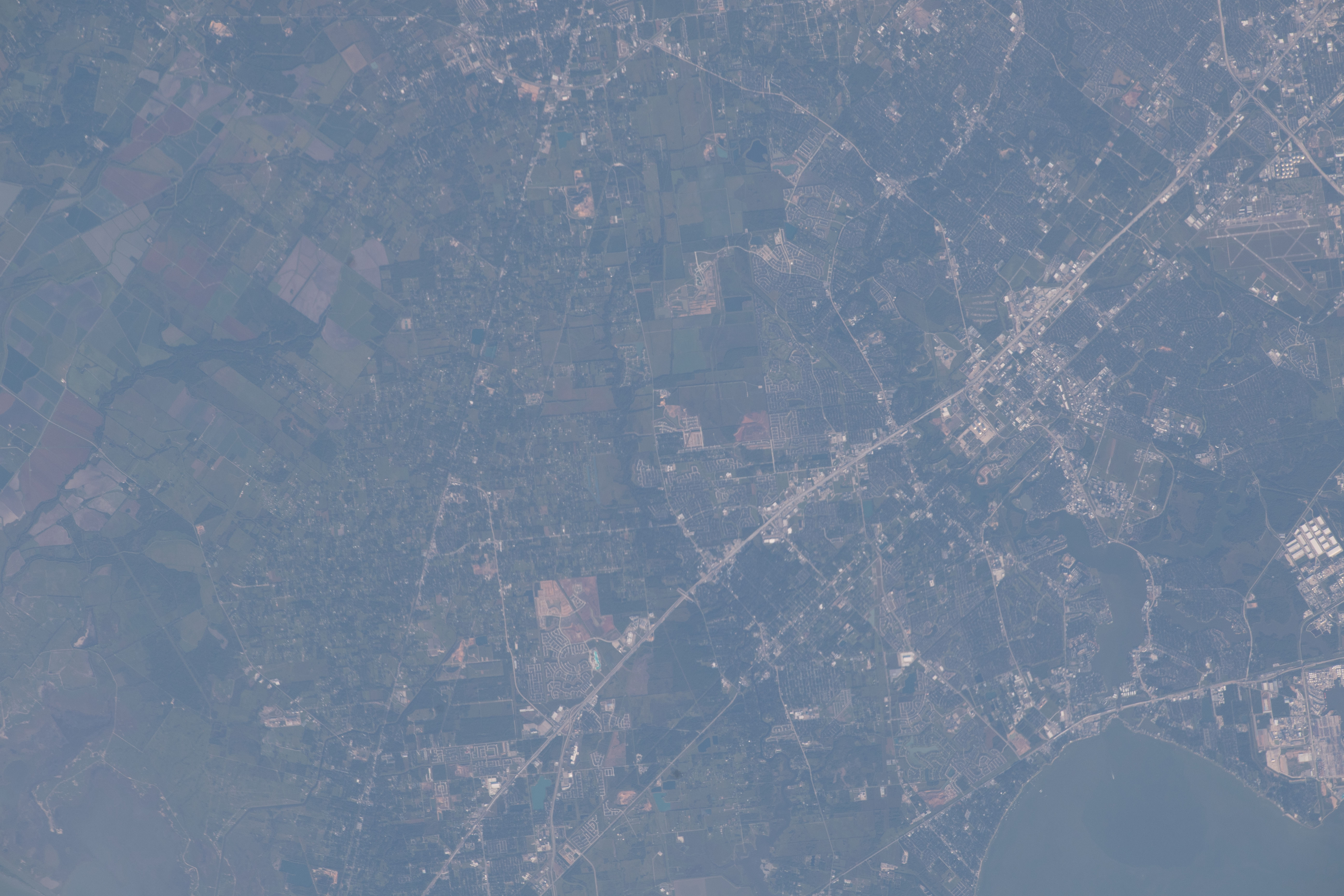
Part of the Southbelt/Ellington neighborhood and vicinity on July 9, 2022, taken from the International Space Station with north oriented towards the right. Ellington Airport is in the upper right corner, and Interstate 45 runs diagonally through the center.

South Belt/Ellington is a neighborhood located around 20 miles southeast of Downtown Houston, Texas.

== History ==
Before the Spaniards came to America the South Belt area was dominated by the Karankawa natives. Explorers that came into the area feared the Karankawas and viewed them as savages and cannibals. However, when settlers first began to settle in the area, they were greeted by somewhat neighborly natives.

In the 19th and early 20th century the area that is now known as South Belt was mainly used for farming and ranching. By the 1960s however the Ayrshire Development Corp., who had bought the land, began to look into developing the area.

In 1963 Ayrshire built five homes and established a water district. A year later he sold the first home to the George West family. The area began to grow and develop quickly until the 1980s when it became known that toxic waste had been dumped in the area by Brio Refining Inc. and was causing a high number of birth defects in children living in the South Bend subdivision. Because of this 677 homes and Arlyne S. Weber Elementary were demolished and the site became the Brio Superfund site.

In the 2000s the area began to flourish again as many new homes and businesses were built in the area including the Clear Brook Landing subdivision which was built near the Superfund Site and a new Weber Elementary which is on Blackhawk Blvd.

== Libraries ==
South Belt/Ellington is serviced by branches of both the Harris County Public Library (Parker Williams Library) and Houston Public Library (Bracewell Library).

== Education ==
=== Public schools ===
South Belt is served by both the Pasadena Independent School District and Clear Creek Independent School District.

Pasadena ISD schools:

- High schools: J. Frank Dobie High School
- Intermediate schools: Beverly Hills, Thompson
- Middle schools: Morris Fifth Grade Center, Rick Schneider, Dr. Dixie Melillo Middle School
- Elementary schools: Atkinson, Bush, Burnett, Frazier, Genoa, Jessup, Meador, Moore, Stuchberry and South Belt

=== Private schools ===
- Lutheran South Academy

=== Colleges ===
Residents of Pasadena ISD (and therefore Southbelt/Ellington) are zoned to San Jacinto College.

- San Jacinto College South Campus
