= Manchester, Houston =

Coordinates: 29.718°N 95.260°W

Manchester is a community in southeastern Houston, Texas, United States.

Manchester has 6 square miles (16 km^{2}) of area. It is located in close proximity to the Houston Ship Channel, and many chemical plants, refineries, and sewage facilities.

== History ==
Manchester began in the 1860s as a railroad switch. By the 1970s the area became predominantly industrial and by the 1980s the area became predominantly Hispanic.

The State of Texas concluded that, since 2000, the area had the highest annual averages of 1,3-Butadiene of any area in Texas. On May 27, 2005, the State opened a pollution monitor in Manchester.

In 2019 Mayor of Houston Sylvester Turner added Manchester to the Complete Communities program.

== Cityscape ==
About 455 houses combined are in Harrisburg and Manchester. Area features include chemical plants, refineries, sewage facilities, car crushing facilities, and hazardous cargo areas. Nearby plants are owned by Goodyear, LyondellBasell, Texas Petro-Chemicals, and Valero. These facilities, including the Valero Houston Refinery, are located alongside the Houston Ship Channel.

It is near Magnolia Park.

== Government and infrastructure ==
Manchester is in Houston City Council District I.

The Harris Health System (formerly Harris County Hospital District) designated the Ripley Health Center for the ZIP code 77012. In 2000 Ripley was replaced by the Gulfgate Health Center. The designated public hospital is Ben Taub General Hospital in the Texas Medical Center.

== Demographics ==
As of 2017 about 4,000 people lived around Manchester. As of 2018 almost 2,000 people live in the Harrisburg/Manchester area, with 98% being Hispanic or Latino.

In the city of Houston-defined Harrisburg/Manchester Super Neighborhood, which also includes Harrisburg, there were 2,926 residents in 2015. 82% were Hispanics, 14% were non-Hispanic blacks, and 3% were non-Hispanic whites. The percentages of non-Hispanic Asians and others were both zero. In 2000 the super neighborhood had 3,768 residents. 88% were Hispanics, 6% were non-Hispanic blacks, and 5% were non-Hispanic whites. The percentages of non-Hispanic Asians and others were both zero.

== Crime, poverty, and illness ==
Kristin Moe of Yes! stated that occasional bouts of illness occur due to the chemical plants, and that "Drugs, unemployment, and gangs are a problem." Dina Capello of the Houston Chronicle stated in 2005 that drug dealers and prostitutes reside in the area.

== Education ==
Manchester is within the Houston Independent School District. Zoned schools include:

- J. R. Harris Elementary School
- Deady Middle School
- Milby High School

== Parks and recreation ==
Hartman Park is located in Manchester.
