= Braeburn, Houston =

Community of subdivisions in southwest Houston, Texas

Coordinates: 29.680°N 95.510°W

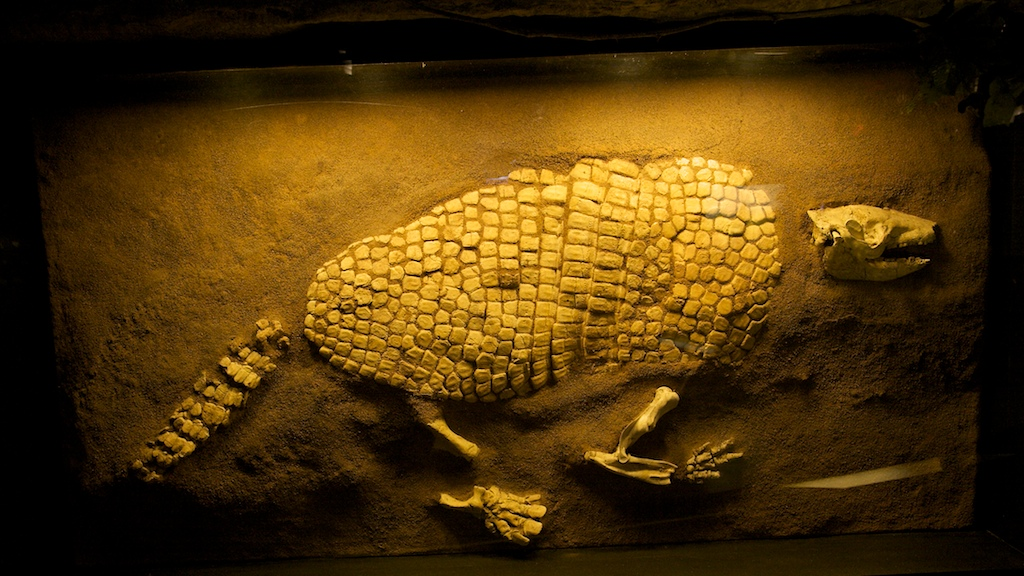
Giant Armadillo fossil found along Bray's Bayou, on display at the Houston Museum of Natural Science.

Braeburn is a community of subdivisions in southwest Houston, Texas along Brays Bayou west of Hillcroft Avenue and south of the Sharpstown community. The first of these middle class subdivisions was developed after World War II at a time when the Richmond Farm-to-Market Road (later renamed as Bissonnet Street) provided the route into the city, rather than U.S. Highway 59. Development continued into the 1970s. The Braeburn Country Club is located in the center of the community. Subdivisions found here include Robindell, Braeburn Terrace, Braeburn Glen, Larkwood, Braeburn Valley, Bonham Acres, Braes Timbers and—the acreage lot subdivision—Brae Acres. The area also includes commercial and multi-family developments. Braeburn is notable for its large number of mid-century modern homes, tree lined streets, and location close to the Galleria, the Texas Medical Center, Reliant Park, the major freeways- 59, 610 and the Beltway. The communities of Braeburn have in recent years formed the Braeburn Superneighborhood, a coalition of Home Owner Associations, in order to interact more effectively with the City of Houston and other area agencies. The Brays Bayou hike and bike trail runs through the community, providing easy access to over 15 miles of excellent trails.

== Fire service ==
This neighborhood is served by Fire Station 68 , located on the corner of Bissonnet and Gessner, next to Braeburn Glen Park and Lee LeClear Tennis center.

== Police service ==
The neighborhood is served by the Houston Police Department's Fondren Patrol Division, as well as the Beechnut substation .

The Braeburn Police Storefront Station is located at 10101 Fondren Road.

== Education ==
=== Public schools ===
Houston Independent School District.

Braes Timbers, Larkwood and portions of Braeburn Valley and Robindell are zoned to McNamara Elementary School, Braeburn Glen is zoned to Bonham Elementary School, Braeburn Terrace and a portion of Robindell are zoned to Herod Elementary School, and a portion of Braeburn Valley is zoned to Milne Elementary School.

Braeburn Glen, Larkwood, and portions of Braeburn Valley and Robindell are zoned to Sharpstown Middle School, Braeburn Terrace and a portion of Robindell are zoned to Fondren Middle School, and portions of Braeburn Valley are zoned to Welch Middle School.

Braeburn Glen, Larkwood, Braeburn Valley, and Robindell are zoned to Sharpstown High School. Bellaire High School is nearby, and Houston Baptist University is to the immediate north of Braeburn.

=== Private schools ===
Robindell Private School, a kindergarten through third grade private school, is in the area.

== Media ==
The Bellaire Texan, which served the Braeburn area community in the mid-20th Century, was headquartered in Bellaire and published by the Texan Publishing Corporation. By 1975, it became known as the Bellaire & Southwestern Texan and was published by the Preston Publishing Company. It was then headquartered in Houston.
