= West End (Houston) =

Neighborhood in Houston, Texas

Coordinates: 29.773°N 95.404°W

West End is a neighborhood in Houston, Texas, United States located along the Washington Avenue Corridor.

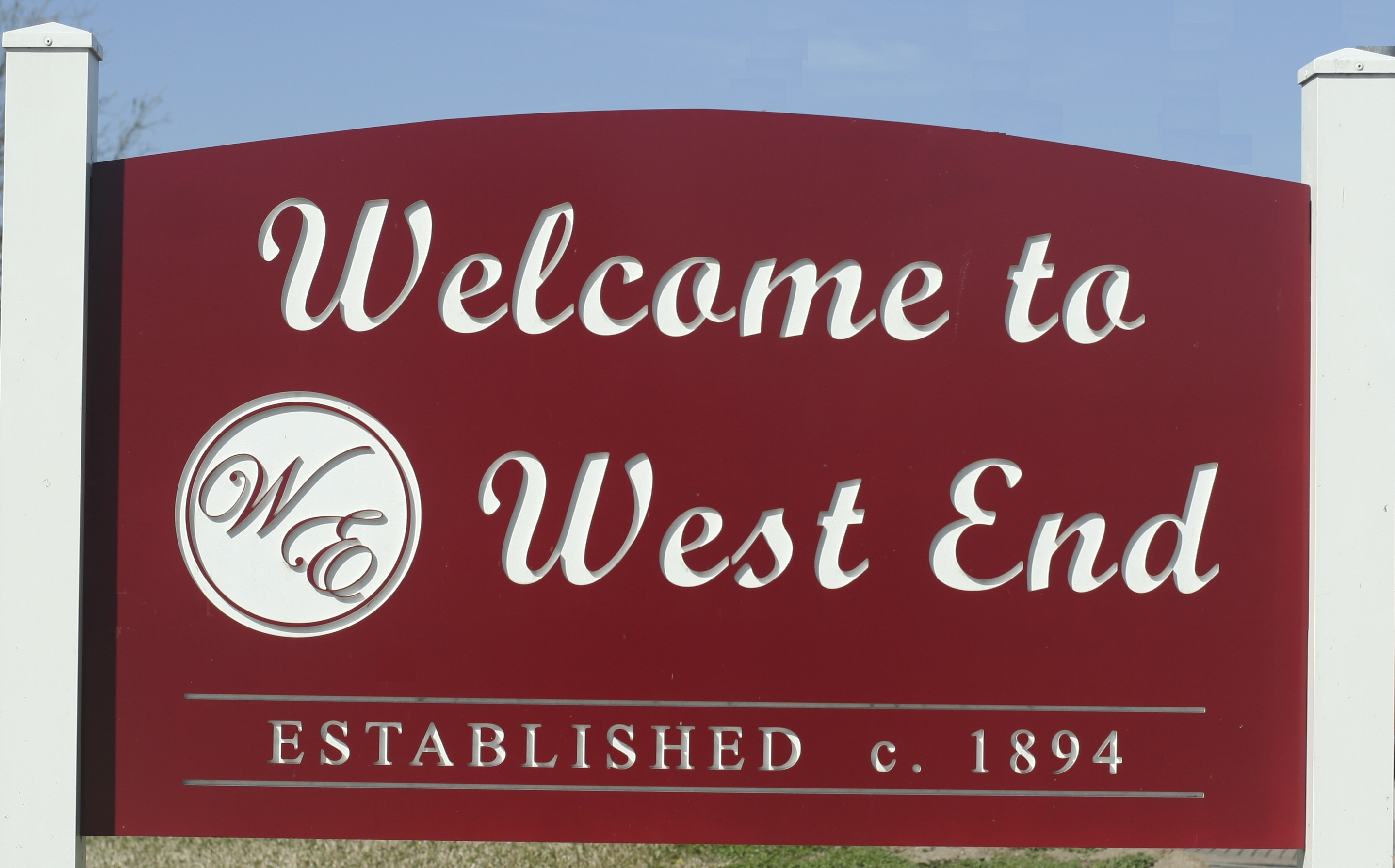
West End neighborhood sign

The West End was traditionally a working-class neighborhood that was established in the early 1920s in Houston Texas. Recent gentrification has increased the population density and the development of numerous townhome communities has grown and businesses that cater to the demographic have increased. For many residents, the area known as the West End was the land north of Memorial Drive, south of I-10, east of Westcott and west of Studemont.

The area had a variety of mainly wood based residential architecture. The West End Park vicinity originally had an array of 1920s shotgun-style bungalows. The driveways there were paved with crushed seashells. The entire West End area had mainly European American working-class people, although the area surrounding West End Park had mainly African Americans and a few Mexican Americans in the late 1970s. By the mid-1980s the crack epidemic ravaged the African American area particularly around Patterson St. and Eli St. The crack houses in the area were well known throughout the city, and rivaled those of the 5th Ward. Latino Americans started moving into the area by the 1980s. Crime and prostitution were rampant especially in and around Washington area bars and liquor stores. By the 1990s, industries in the area were already in decline. A large metal company along with other businesses closed. By the 2000s, redevelopers transformed the area and renamed areas in the West End.

The main street that runs east to west until it breaks off towards and over interstate 10, is Washington Avenue.

The area nearer to the beautiful Memorial Park had larger wood-framed houses with expansive yards until it was gentrified, beginning in the 1990s. The park is a neighborhood fixture, and was at one point an army base named Camp Logan where a mutiny raged at one point.

Buffalo Bayou serves as a natural southern border for the West End. White Oak Bayou also meanders through a portion of it. The Houston Heights is a natural buffer to the north.

The official boundaries of West End are Durham Drive to the west, Washington Avenue to the south, I-10 to the north and Yale St. to the east.

The parts of this area that were the worst affected by neglect, poverty, and the Houston crack epidemic have been completely redeveloped.

West End is also a part of Super Neighborhood 22, an organized collection of neighborhood civic clubs along the Washington Corridor that voices their neighborhoods' interests to various local issues/situations.

== Government ==
West End is in the 18th Texas Congressional District and is a part of the Houston City Council District "C".

== Parks and recreation ==
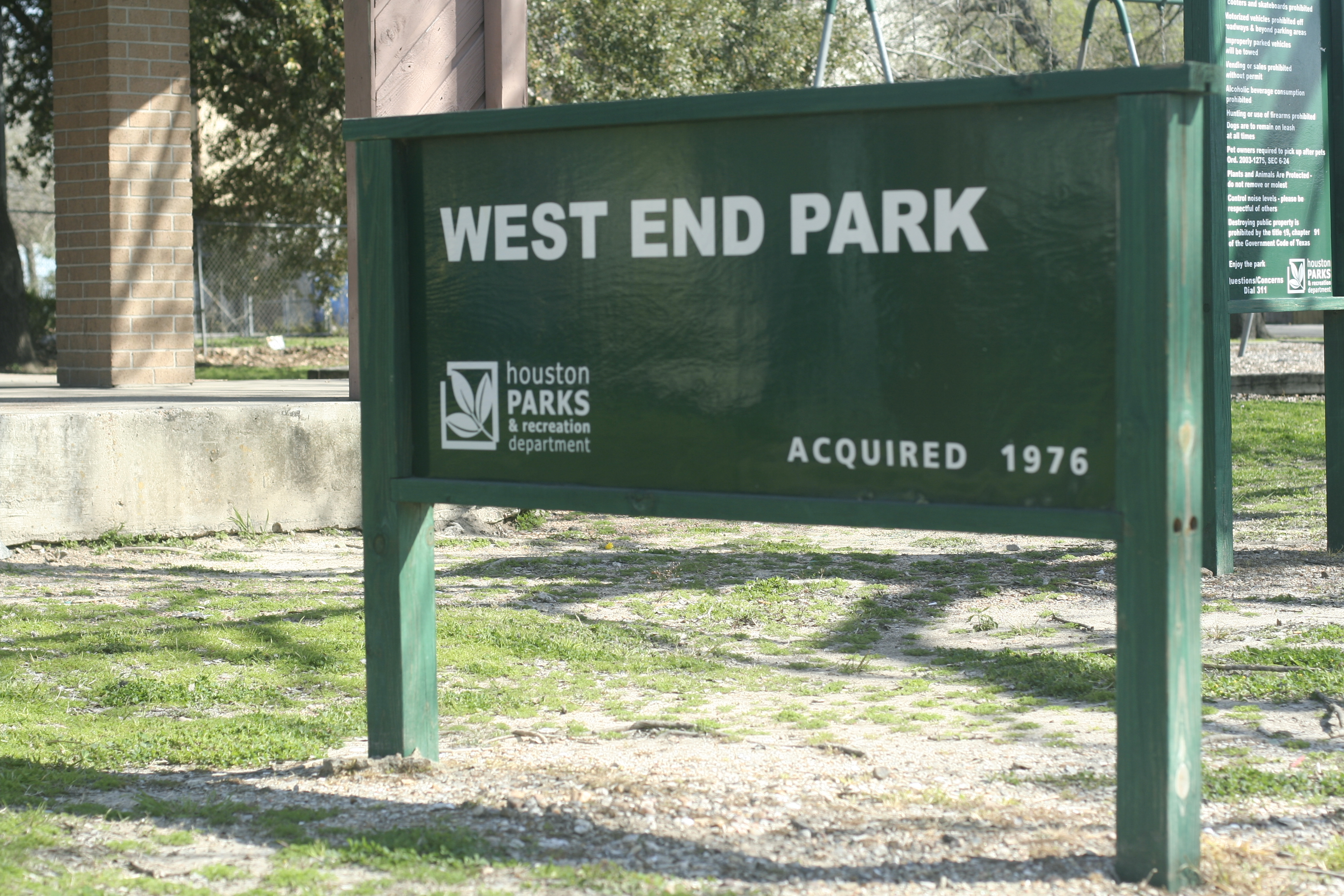
West End park sign

West End Park, established in 1976, is located on the east side of Patterson Street between Koehler and Eli Streets

== Education ==
West End residents are zoned to the following Houston Independent School District (HISD) public schools:

- Memorial Elementary School
- Hogg Middle School
- Reagan High School

Previously it was zoned to Milam Elementary School. In April 2004 the HISD board voted to close Milam, rezoning its students to Memorial. Milam was later converted into a private preschool.

== See also ==
- West End Civic Club
- Houston Super Neighborhood 22
- Galehouse, Maggie. "Houston designer Brett Zamore reviving kit homes." Houston Chronicle. Friday July 18, 2008.
