= Inwood Forest, Houston =

Neighborhood of Houston, Texas

Coordinates: 29.86°N 95.49°W

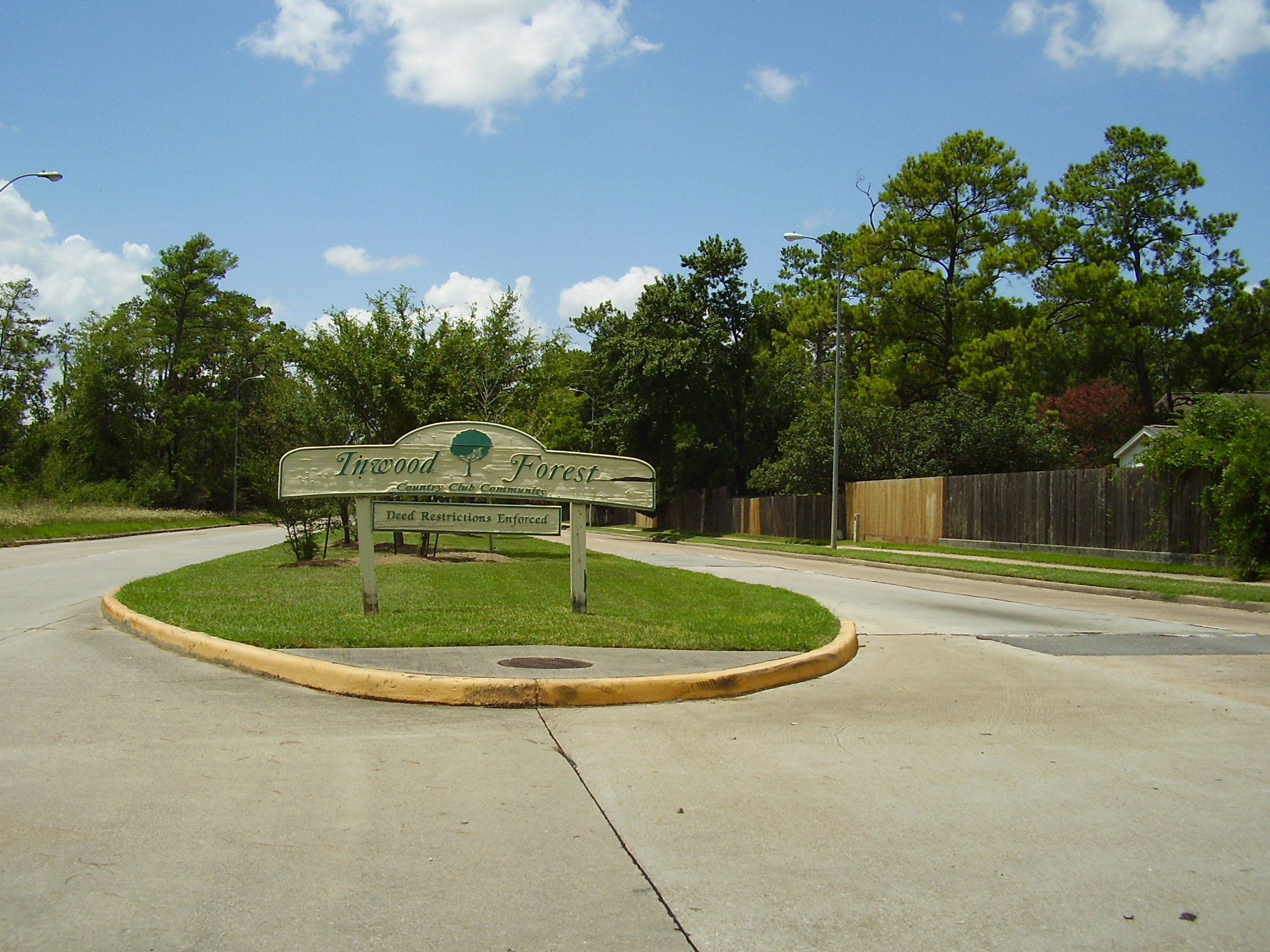
Sign indicating the community

Inwood Forest is a community about a 3/4-mile west of historic Acres Homes in northwest Houston, Texas, United States.

== History ==
Land in what is now Inwood Forest was originally Native American hunting grounds. In the 1860s German American farmers settled along the White Oak Bayou. For a 100-year period until 1963, the Fuchs family owned the land that would become Inwood Forest and surrounding subdivisions; during that year a real estate developer bought the land. Many of the original houses in Inwood Forest were developed for oil company executives. Wayne Norden, the president of the Near Northwest Management District, stated in 2011 that Inwood Forest was a different kind of neighborhood in the 1970s than in the 2010s. The City of Houston annexed the Inwood Forest area in 1975, adding 2,125 acres (860 ha) of land to the city limits. The neighborhood began to change after a recession in the late 1980s. Many businesses shut down, and former residents moved to suburbs.

Dennie Hodge, an Inwood Forest resident quoted in the Houston Chronicle, said that around three-fourths of the houses in her neighborhood flooded during Tropical Storm Allison. After Hurricane Katrina, evacuees from the hurricane poured into the Houston area. The occupancy rates of apartments around Inwood Forest increased from the 40 to 60 percent range to almost 100 percent. Julie Grothues, president of the Inwood Forest Community Improvement Association, said in a 2008 Houston Chronicle article that she saw children playing in the streets of Inwood Forest while she did not see any in 1978.

Throughout several years leading to 2011, the City of Houston had demolished older apartment complexes. In 2011 the city demolished the Gables Apartments.

== Cityscape ==
The boundaries of the community are Gulf Bank Road to the north, U.S. Route 290 to the west, Pinemont to the south, and T.C. Jester to the east. It consists of 32 subdivisions. It is located within a 30-minute commute from Downtown Houston, Uptown, and George Bush Intercontinental Airport. Dennie Hodge, an Inwood Forest resident and real estate broker quoted in the Houston Chronicle, said that Inwood Forest is five minutes away from the 610 Loop.

The community was designed to complement the fairways of the Inwood Forest Country Club. Many roads have esplanades and mature trees. One street that has many custom houses also has large landscaped lots. As of 2011 Inwood Forest contains many single-family houses surrounded by deteriorating apartment complexes. Apartment complexes are located to the north and south of Inwood Forest. Hodge described the complexes as "scary," not well maintained, and as a "high crime area."

== Government and infrastructure ==
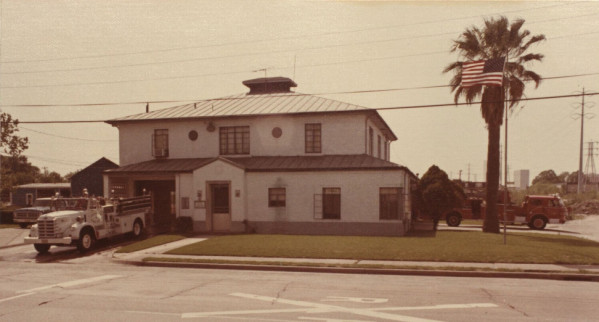
Fire Station 4, 1976

Houston Fire Department operates Station 4 Inwood, which is in Fire District 4. Fire Station 4, originally located in the historical Second Ward, moved to various other locations before reopening in its current location in 1986.

== Education ==
=== Primary and secondary schools ===
==== Public schools ====
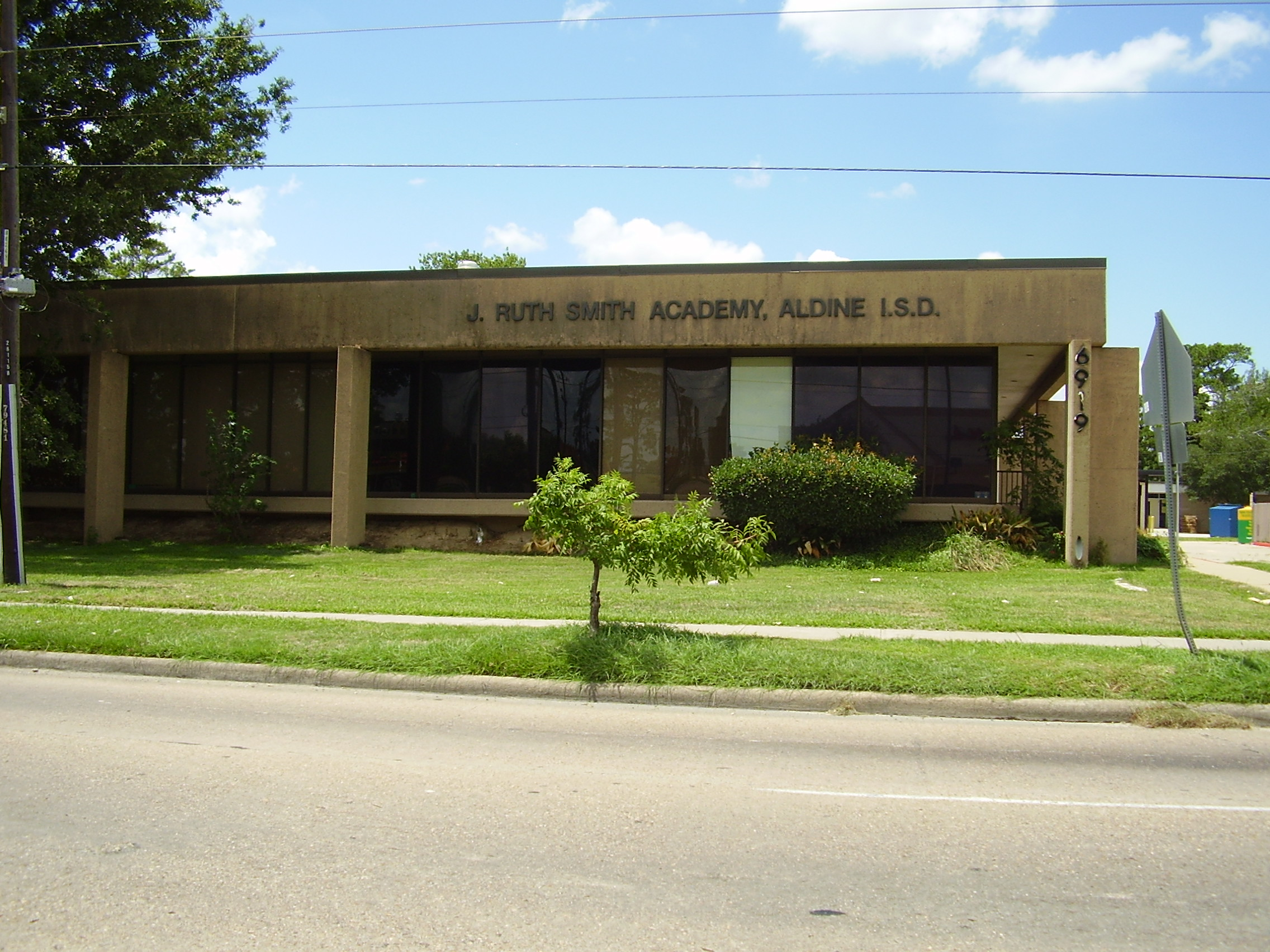
J. Ruth Smith Elementary School (formerly named "Academy") serves western portions of Inwood Forest and previously served the entire community

The community is within the Aldine Independent School District. Portions of Inwood Forest are zoned to Vines Early Childhood/Prekindergarten/Kindergarten (EC/PK/K) and Stovall EC/PK/K for early childhood through Kindergarten, J. Ruth Smith Elementary (formerly Academy) and Caraway Elementary School for the elementary level. All residents are zoned to Floyd Hoffman Middle School, Eisenhower Ninth Grade School, and Eisenhower High School.

Previously the entire community was served by a single set of schools: Vines Early Childhood/Prekindergarten School, Smith Academy, Caraway Intermediate (then a school for grades 5–6), Hoffman Middle, Eisenhower Ninth Grade, and Eisenhower High.

Nearby subdivisions are served by Klein Forest High School in the Klein Independent School District.

== Parks and recreation ==
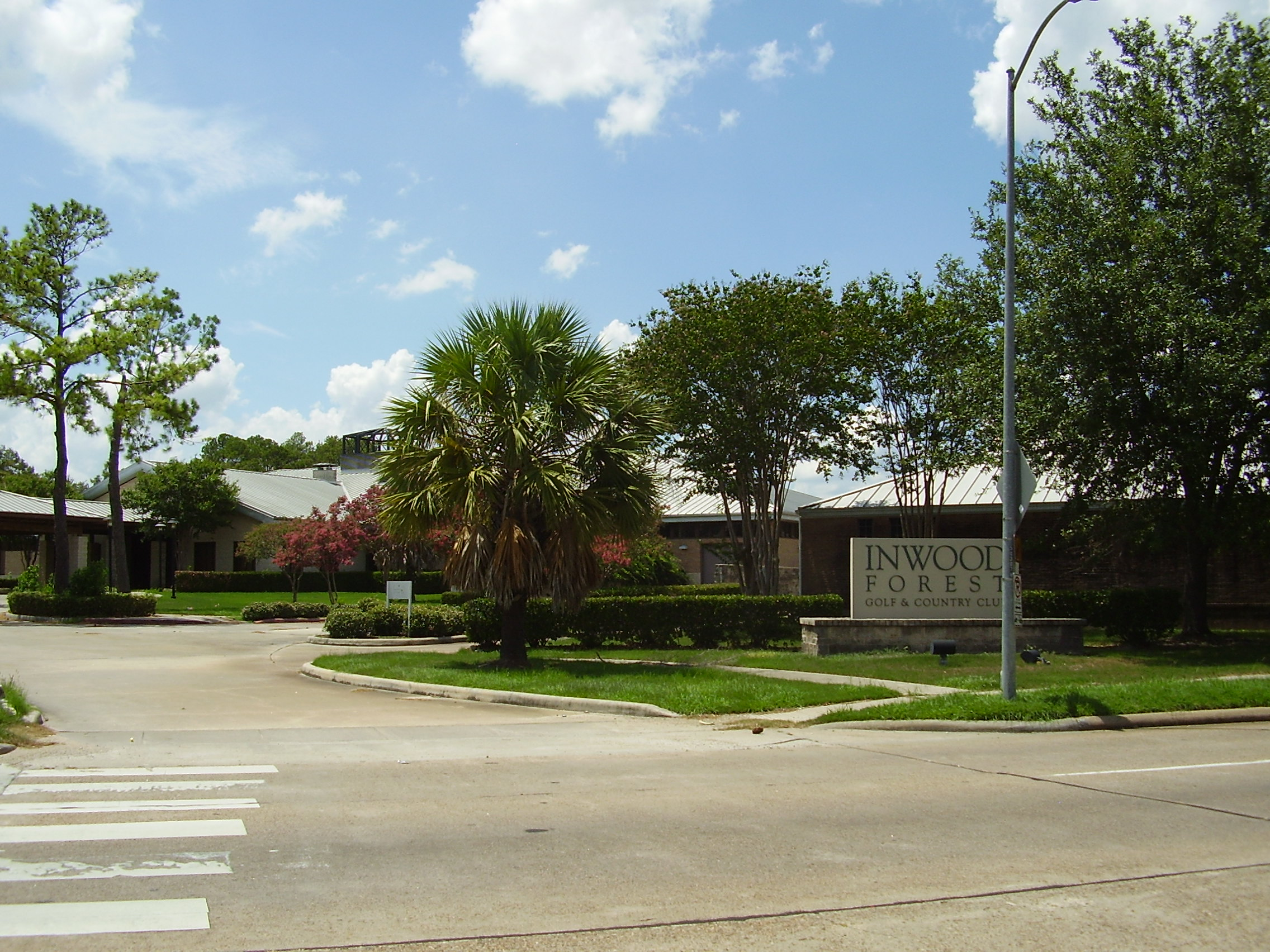
Inwood Forest Golf & Country Club

The Inwood Forest Country Club was located in the community. It closed in 2007. On April 7, 2011, the sale of the facility from Inwood Forest Partners (IFP) to the City of Houston closed. The City of Houston acquired the former Inwood Forest Golf Course with the intent of providing "passive" recreational space and to improve drainage in the area.
