= Thai Xuan Village =

Coordinates: 29.675°N 95.278°W

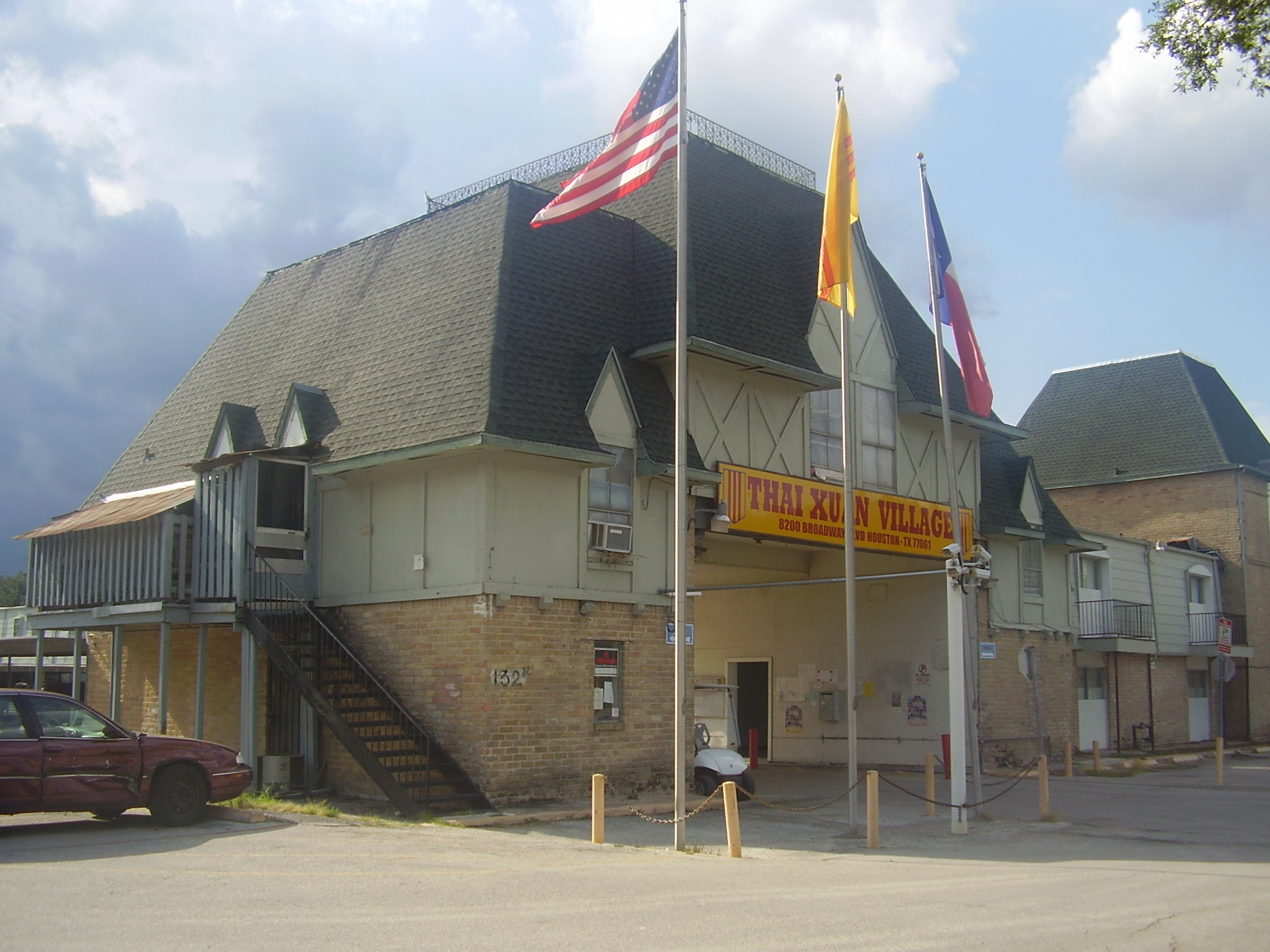
Thai Xuan Village

Thai Xuan Village (Vietnamese: Làng Thái Xuân) is a multi-family condominium complex in southeastern Houston, Texas. It is located in proximity to Hobby Airport. It houses a large Vietnamese immigrant population.

== History ==
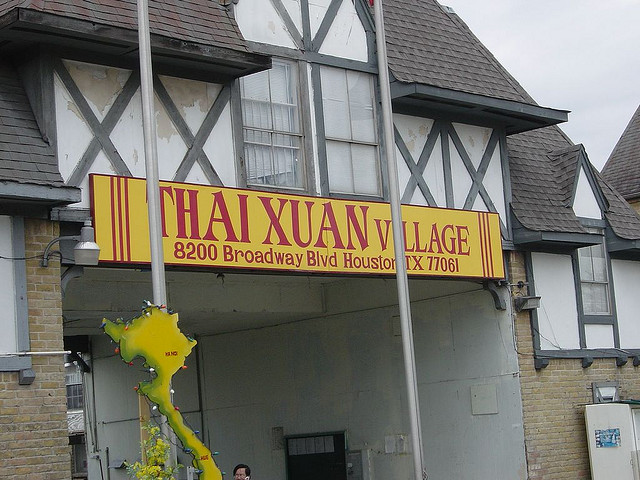
Thai Xuan Village in 2002

Father John Chinh Tran, a Catholic priest, founded the apartment complex. He named it after Thái Xuân, a hamlet in Xuân Lộc District, South Vietnam he had founded in the 1950s with peasants who fled from North Vietnam. The group, who were Catholic, were from Thái Bình Province. Due to the Xuân Lộc location and the Thai Binh origin, the hamlet was named "Thai Xuan". After the Vietnam War lead to the disestablishment of South Vietnam, many Catholic refugees arrived in the United States. In Houston, Chinh founded Thai Xuan Village as a new community, and named it after the old village.

The new Thai Xuan was founded in the former Cavalier Apartments facility. It was one of several apartments that lost White middle class tenants after the 1980s oil bust. In 1993 a development company owned by another immigrant Vietnamese purchased Cavalier. Paragon First Trading, controlled by Tony Nguyen, sold Vietnamese people condominium units for low prices.

After the apartment complex changed hands, many Mexican Americans who had been living in the complex came into conflict with the arriving Vietnamese. Josh Harkinson said that the Mexican American population was "territorial." Louis Ballesteros, a police officer who headed a nearby Houston Police Department storefront, received telephone calls from both Mexican Americans and the Vietnamese, with the Mexican Americans complaining about the Vietnamese operating "the way they wanted to live" and the Vietnamese accused the Mexican Americans of stealing and vandalizing. Ultimately Ballesteros used a federal mediator to resolve the conflict.

In October 1996, Paragon First Trading filed for bankruptcy. It had not surrendered the deeds or replatted the units. A court-appointed lawyer took possession of Thai Xuan Village. Paragon had a debt of $500,000 in back taxes. Several residents believed they had been victimized, and feared that they would be expelled from the complex. The residents protested to raise awareness of their situation. As a result of the hearings, the fact that villagers had renovated the residents had renovated the buildings while not having permits to do so was publicized. Tony Nguyen, who had legally changed his name to Benjamin Armstrong, decided to work with the residents and the bankruptcy trustee, allowing the residents to remain living in Thai Xuan Village. Through legal action, the Thai Xuan residents won the deeds to their units, with a condition stipulating that the residents had to make payments.

In February 2007, residents of Glenbrook Valley complained to Mayor of Houston Bill White about the condition of the complex. Around that time, the City of Houston was offering apartment complexes funds from municipal and federal sources so the apartments can be renovated, with up to $25,000 per unit funded; Thai Xuan was not eligible since it was an all-condominium complex.

== Composition ==
Thai Xuan Village, which has 380 units, is entirely composed of condominiums, and not apartments.

In 1998 Betty Ann Bowser, a reporter for PBS NewsHour, said that Thai Xuan Village was "beginning to show its age." In 2007 residents of Glenbrook Valley characterized the complex, as paraphrased by Ruth Samuelson of the Houston Press, as "a firetrap with numerous building code violations" that had been "falling apart for years". Samuelson said in 2007 that Thai Xuan Village was "[t]he most dilapidated complex" of the multi-family complexes in its area.

As of 2005 it has an underground reserve of oil which is worth $40,000 per unit. The presence contributed to a mid-1990s legal dispute.

=== Exterior and façade ===
Josh Harkinson of the Houston Press said "unmatched shingles and cracked parking lots" present in the complex "suggest Houston." He explained that the complex's buildings "could form almost any decaying and ersatz apartment complex in the city" except that the flag of South Vietnam planted in the complex's courtyard and a large yellow placard labeled "Thai Xuan Village" give the appearance unique aspects. Harkinson said that from the outside the flag and the placard are the "only signs of pride". The complex has pitched roofs with wrought iron fringes. Harkinson said that the roofs "almost evoke French villas."

The south side of the complex has a courtyard with a Virgin Mary statue. A sign above the Virgin Mary says "God is Love" in Vietnamese. The residents raised $60,000 (about $93163.22 when adjusted for inflation), with some outside donations, to have the courtyard constructed. By 2007 it had been completed.

=== Microfarms ===
As of 2005 the interior of the complex includes various microfarms located on yards. The microfarms have a variety of plants growing herbs and vegetables native to Vietnam, including calamondins, choy greens, limes, night jasmine, melons, mints, papaya trees, peppers, and satsumas. Josh Harkinson of the Houston Press said that when one enters the complex, it "unfurls like a lotus flower."

=== Facilities ===
In 2005 Thai Xuan included the Thai Xuan chapel, located behind a central courtyard. The chapel hosted a prayer hour each day, and held masses twice weekly in the Vietnamese language. The complex included the Com Phat Food Mart, which sold Asian cooking supplies and produce, the Tan Hiep Food Market, a grocery store, and Cao Thang Sandwich, a bánh mì shop. It housed Atom Video, a video rental with Vietnamese movies, and Hair Beauty, a hair salon. In addition to the church, grocery store, and salon, in 1997 Thai Xuan also housed a school and a travel agency. Thai Xuan included the Mayor Lee Brown Library, a one-room facility. Josh Harkinson of the Houston Press said in 2005 that it was "decomposing."

At one time shortly after the multifamily complex changed hands, the Vietnamese were building a temple in a parking lot of the complex.

== Demographics ==
As of 2007, 1,400 people lived in Thai Xuan Village. Almost all of the residents were ethnic Vietnamese. 30% of the residents were Roman Catholics. As of 1998, few of the residents spoke English. In 1997 the complex had over 1,000 residents. Many of the residents worked in minimum wage jobs. In 1997 some residents were veterans of the Vietnam War.

== Health ==
The first community health assessment of this village, along with other Vietnamese multifamily complexes in Houston, was published by St. Luke's Episcopal Health Charities in 2004. Tran Linh, a Harris County Hospital District outreach counselor who was born in Vietnam who had worked in the Vietnamese multifamily complexes for one decade by 2004, assisted the production of the report. In regards to the villages, Linh said "Deep down in the community, there is a big need of medical care." As a result of the report, Mayor of Houston Bill White responded by creating a task force. The task force was scheduled to have Rogene Gee Calvert, the head of a political action committee oriented to Asian Americans, as its leader.

== Culture ==
Ruth Samuelson of the Houston Press said that the residents "formed a tight-knit, law-abiding community." Josh Harkinson of the Houston Press said that the complex has a "tightly knit community."

As of 2005, many residents engage in farming, despite the space constraints. Josh Harkinson of the Houston Press said that farming in Thai Xuan Village "has been as much a hobby as an occupation." Before November 2005, many residents also sold goods from within the village, including homegrown wares sold by women, bún chả, and whole flounders caught by the vendors' relatives, in the parking lot. Municipal health inspectors asked the residents to stop selling food. In November 2005 the police told the woman who sold the fish that she would be arrested if she did not pay the fine, so at that point the market ended.

In 2005 Harkinson said "The cultural norms of Thai Xuan's yeomen often trump the complex's old building codes" which had been written when the complex was first constructed, before it became Thai Xuan Village.

Residents celebrate the Mid-Autumn Festival, held at the courtyard.

=== Religion ===
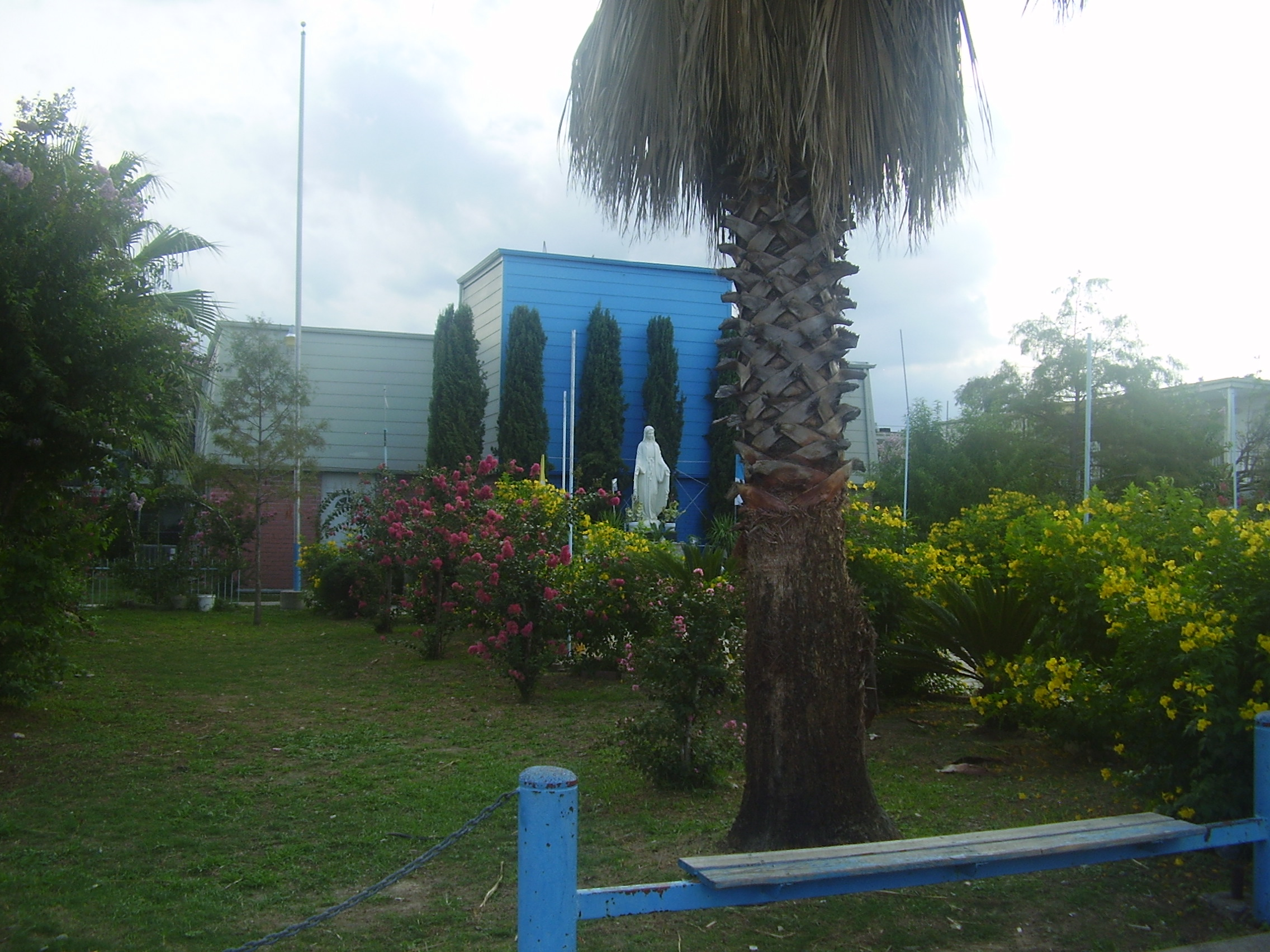
Virgin Mary grotto

During the same year, due to the presence of the religious institutions, Harkinson said "Religion is literally at the center of daily life in the village -- just as it was in Vietnam," referring to the Roman Catholic influence in the former Thai Xuan village in South Vietnam. Harkinson added that while Chinh originally exerted a lot of Catholic influence, the influence was decreasing. In 2005 Thai Xuan was the only Vietnamese village complex where Chinh held masses. In 2005 the village chief of Thai Xuan Village was building the community's first stone Buddha. In 2005 less than 33% of the residents were Roman Catholic.

== Government and infrastructure ==
Thai Xuan is in Houston City Council District I.

== Education ==
Thai Xuan is zoned to the Houston Independent School District. The zoned schools are Park Place Elementary School, Ortíz Middle School, and Chávez High School.

Prior to the opening of Ortiz, which was built in 2002, Thai Xuan was zoned to Stevenson Middle School. Stevenson opened in January 1994. Prior to the opening of Chávez, Thai Xuan was zoned to Milby High School. Chávez opened in 2000.

== See also ==
- Gulfton, Houston
- History of Vietnamese Americans in Houston
