= List of killings by law enforcement officers in the United States, January 2019 =

This is a list of people reported killed by non-military law enforcement officers in the United States in January 2019, whether in the line of duty or not, and regardless of reason or method. The listing documents the occurrence of a death, making no implications regarding wrongdoing or justification on the part of the person killed or officer involved. Killings are arranged by date of the incident that caused death. Different death dates, if known, are noted in the description. The table below lists 94 people.

== January 2019 ==
Date	Name (age) of deceased	State (city)	Description
2019-01-30	Michael Joe Jolls (47)	Arizona (Phoenix)	Jolls was shot and killed by police.
2019-01-30	Anthony Pellissier (52)	Texas (Midland)	Pellissier was shot and killed by police.
2019-01-30	Nicholas P. Philhower (30)	New York (Binghamton)	Philhower was pulled over by a New York State Trooper after the vehicle he was driving matched the one reported by Philhower's mother who said her son had stolen her car. As the officer stopped Philhower, he fired at the officer with a military styled rifle through the back of the vehicle. The officer returned fire through his windshield, before stopping to reload. At this moment Philower exited his vehicle and began to approach the police car firing his rifle. The officer reloaded, exited his own vehicle, and shot the exposed Philhower several times killing him instantly.
2019-01-29	Paul Cantu (27)	Texas (Austin)	Cantu was shot and killed by police.
2019-01-29	Siatu'u Tauai (51)	Hawaii (Kalihi)	Tauai was shot and killed by police.
2019-01-28	David Michael Bosiljevac (55)	Kansas (Wichita)	Bosiljevac was shot and killed by police.
2019-01-28	Nekiylo Dawayne Graves (27)	Nevada (Nevada National Security Site)	Graves was shot and killed by police.
2019-01-28	Gregory Griffin (46)	New Jersey (Newark)	Griffin was shot and killed by police.
2019-01-28	Richard Moulton (52)	California (Butte County)	Moulton was shot and killed by police.
2019-01-28	Rhogena Ann Nicholas (58)	Texas (Houston)	Officers entered the home of Tuttle and Nicholas via a no-knock-warrant, due to an informant's tip that the home had illegal drugs, although no drugs were found in the home. Upon entry officers shot and killed the family dog, and encountered Tuttle who had armed himself to defend against intruders while Nicholas was unarmed. Officers shot and killed Tuttle and Nicholas, with four officers injured by bullets and one with a knee injury.
2019-01-28	Dennis Wayne Tuttle (59)	Texas (Houston)	Officers entered the home of Tuttle and Nicholas via a no-knock-warrant, due to an informant's tip that the home had illegal drugs, although no drugs were found in the home. Upon entry officers shot and killed the family dog, and encountered Tuttle who had armed himself to defend against intruders while Nicholas was unarmed. Officers shot and killed Tuttle and Nicholas, with four officers injured by bullets and one with a knee injury.
2019-01-28	Joey Duane Ramirez (29)	Michigan (Jacksonville)	Ramirez was shot and killed by police.
2019-01-28	Carl Thayer (45)	California (Tehama County)	Thayer was shot and killed by police.
2019-01-27	Jacob Archambault (25)	South Dakota (Rosebud)	Archambault was shot and killed by police.
2019-01-25	Jeffrey Lynn Jones (60)	Tennessee (Dyersburg)	Jones was shot and killed by police.
2019-01-25	Robert C. Martin (69)	Florida (Escambia County)	Martin was shot and killed by police.
2019-01-25	Russ Allen McClellan (48)	Texas (Garland)	McClellan was shot and killed by police.
2019-01-24	Christian Albarran (26)	Arizona (Ehrenberg)	Albarran, who was wanted by in California, was chased by the Californian Highway Patrol for a 146 mile chase that brought them across the border. Albarran was then stopped by Arizona state troopers and the La Paz County sheriff's deputy. After refusing to obey commands and allegedly making a threatening motion (he was believed to be armed) officers opened fire, killing him.
2019-01-24	Katlyn Alix (24)	St. Louis, Missouri	Alix, an off-duty St. Louis police officer, was shot and killed by fellow officer Nathan Hendren at his home after a variation of Russian roulette.
2019-01-23	Preston Oszust (20)	Arizona (Flagstaff)	Oszust was shot by police and died on January 24th.
2019-01-23	Marcus Gishal (20)	Arizona (Flagstaff)	Gishal was shot and killed by police.
2019-01-23	Dwight Steward (46)	Washington (Spokane)	Steward was shot and killed by police.
2019-01-23	Kevin Grant Vawter (46)	Indiana (South Haven)	Vawter was shot and killed by police.
2019-01-22	Jimmy Atchison (21)	Georgia (Atlanta)	Atchison was shot and killed by police.
2019-01-21	Horacio Ruiz-Rodriguez	Nevada (Las Vegas)	North Las Vegas Police, responding to a reported kidnapping, shot and killed Ruiz-Rodriguez outside his home after he allegedly told police he was armed and rammed their SUV. The body of a second victim was found under his bed.
2019-01-20	Chance Mavity (26)	Montana (Billings)	Mavity was shot and killed by police.
2019-01-19	Mark Leo Gregory Gago (42)	Oregon (Clackamas County)	Gago was shot and killed by police.
2019-01-19	Jason C. Minnick (30)	Tennessee (Knoxville)	Minnick was shot and killed by police.
2019-01-19	Matthew Neil Tuhkanen (35)	Minnesota (St. Louis Park)	Tuhkanen was shot and killed by police.
2019-01-18	Dale Weich (64)	Missouri (O'Fallon)	Weich was shot and killed by police.
2019-01-17	Mikyas Mehary Tegegne (31)	Maryland (Silver Spring)	Tegegne, claiming he had a bomb, attempted to rob a bank. The teller pressed the alarm and at hearing sirens Tegegne fled the bank. Outside in an alley Tegegne was confronted by an officer responding to the scene who shot Tegegne in an alley. Tegegne later died in hospital, he is suspected of having committed several other bank robberies in the area previously.
2019-01-16	Jesse Jenson (41)	Colorado (LaSalle)	After a high speed chase late at night, off-duty Adams County Sheriff's Deputy Jesse Jenson was shot by a La Salle Police officer pursuing him. Jenson was shot in the head as he exited his vehicle. Alcohol and Prozac were found to be in Jenson's system, both within legal and therapeutic levels, respectively. Police previously stated that another vehicle was involved in the chase. Jenson died in a hospital two days later. The case was referred to a grand jury for further investigation.
2019-01-16	Shawn Joseph Billinger (46)	Colorado (Fort Lupton)	After responding to a call about a disturbance and pursuing Billinger on foot, Officer Zachary Helbig was approached by Billinger who turned and walked rapidly at him yelling “kill me" with nothing in his hands. Officer Helbig shot Billinger once in the chest, who was then pronounced dead at the scene. The Weld County Statutory Grand Jury charged Helbig with manslaughter.
2019-01-16	De’Angelo Brown (30)	Arkansas (West Memphis)	Police attempted to pull over a car with two occupants driving in a suspicious manner with no license plate and the high-beams on. The vehicle did not cooperate and led officers on a lengthy pursuit across the state line. The suspects' car was eventually boxed in by more than 8 police vehicles, but continued to try to ram its way out. When one of the officers attempting to apprehend the suspects was run over, 6 of the officers opened fire, killing both occupants. They were later identified as 22-year-old Megan Brooke Rivera and 30-year-old De’Angelo Jamar Brown, both of Lancaster, South Carolina. The injured officer was hospitalized with a fractured leg. The car the suspects were in was later identified as being stolen from a 72-year-old woman in South Carolina. Officers discovered a .22 rifle and crack cocaine inside the vehicle. The Memphis police department released the dash cam footage of the incident after the families of the deceased filed a complaint against the department.
2019-01-16	Megan Rivera (22)	Arkansas (West Memphis)	
2019-01-16	D'Ettrick Griffin (18)	Georgia (Atlanta)	A man allegedly attempting to steal an unmarked Police car at a gas station was confronted by an ununiformed officer. The individual managed to break in and drive off but was shot by the officer and as a result crashed the car, and was pronounced dead at the scene. The suspect was later identified as 18-year-old D'Ettrick Griffin.
2019-01-16	Terry Lee Cockrell (57)	Oklahoma (Sperry)	Cockrell was shot and killed by police.
2019-01-16	Danny Kelley (32)	North Carolina (Charlotte)	Kelley was shot and killed by police.
2019-01-15	Esmond Trimble (42)	Colorado (Aurora)	Trimble was a rapper from California known under the pseudonym Ron Eazi and had recorded songs with Nipsey Hussle. Around 2 a.m. on 15 January, Trimble shot 58-year-old Dean Heerdt in the latter's house before being shortly confronted outside by police, with both parties exchanging gunfire. Trimble was wearing body armor but was shot multiple times. Heerdt was Trimble's father-in-law. Both Heerdt and Trimble died shortly after in the local hospital.
2019-01-15	Stanley Stepanski III (48)	California (Roseville)	Stepanski was shot and killed by police.
2019-01-15	Quency Chavez Floyd (22)	Missouri (St. Louis)	Floyd was shot and killed by police.
2019-01-15	Antonio Arce (14)	Arizona (Tempe)	Police approached a truck they believed was being burglarized. As they approached they observed a suspect with what appeared to be a gun in the truck. The suspect fled and the officer shot him as he chased. The suspects body was later found. He was later identified as 14-year-old Antonio Arce, who had an air-soft gun. His family disputes the police accounts.
2019-01-14	Amiliano Apodaca (18)	Colorado (Pueblo)	Apodaca was shot and killed by police.
2019-01-14	Damon Murad Asad (33)	Texas (Odessa)	Asad was shot and killed by police.
2019-01-14	Louis Jose Burrus (25)	Texas (El Paso)	Burrus was shot and killed by police.
2019-01-14	Rodney Hamilton (62)	Georgia (Gainesville)	Hamilton was shot and killed by police.
2019-01-14	Nathaniel Holland (37)	California (Vacaville)	Holland was shot and killed by police.
2019-01-14	William Owens (39)	New Jersey (Logan Township)	Owens was shot and killed by police.
2019-01-14	Jahmal Derrick Stewart (45)	California (Linda)	Stewart was shot and killed by police.
2019-01-13	Dimas Diaz Jr. (43)	California (Calabasas)	Diaz was shot and killed by police.
2019-01-13	Keith Harvey (43)	Washington (Lakewood)	Harvey was shot and killed by police.
2019-01-13	George Robinson (62)	Mississippi (Jackson)	Robinson, who is black, was pulled from his car and beaten to death by three police officers, also black, who suspected him of selling drugs and sought to question him regarding a recent murder. All three officers were indicted by a grand jury on second-degree murder charges on August 14, 2020.
2019-01-13	Roberto Tapia (28)	California (Cathedral City)	Tapia was shot and killed by police.
2019-01-13	Nathan Thoe (34)	South Dakota (White Lake)	Thoe was shot and killed by police.
2019-01-12	Bill Gerald Akes (48)	Colorado (Colorado Springs)	Police responded to a call about a suspicious man driving a stolen vehicle. When confronted, Akes rammed police cars with the stolen vehicle and confronted officers with a hatchet. Officer Brock Lofgren shot and killed Akes.
2019-01-12	Christopher Schmitt (58)	Indiana (Dearborn County)	Schmitt was shot and killed by police.
2019-01-11	Jacob Michael Harris (19)	Arizona (Phoenix)	At 12:30 a.m. police pulled over a vehicle with suspects in an earlier crime. During the stop Harris exited the vehicle and reached for a gun in his waistband, and police shot him. The 3 other individuals in the car were arrested.
2019-01-11	Charles Landeros (30)	Oregon (Eugene)	Landeros was at Cascade Middle School over a custody dispute with his ex-wife who was trying to remove their two daughters from the school. Landeros, who had just enrolled the girls in the school, was arguing with the school staff when he was approached by two officers. After not cooperating to instructions to leave, Landeros was forcefully removed by the officers. In the process Landeros pulled out a concealed firearm and shot twice at one of the officers, but missed both times. The officer responded by shooting Landeros in the head, killing him. The officer who fired the shots was later cleared of wrongdoing.
2019-01-11	Juston Landry (26)	Louisiana (Lake Charles)	Landry was shot and killed by police.
2019-01-11	Treshun Symone Miller (20)	Texas (Arlington)	Miller was shot and killed by police.
2019-01-10	Johnny Lee Burney (70)	Alabama (Eclectic)	Burney was shot and killed by police.
2019-01-10	Geoffrey Morris (29)	Kansas (Wichita)	Morris was shot and killed by police.
2019-01-08	Michael W. Mobley (53)	Missouri (Leadwood)	Mobley was shot and killed by police.
2019-01-08	Jerald Wilson (33)	Texas (Midland)	Wilson was shot and killed by police.
2019-01-07	Miguel A. Barraza-Lugo (37)	Washington (Kent)	Barraza-Lugo was shot and killed by police.
2019-01-07	Jeremy Dale Edmonds (42)	Oklahoma (Tulsa)	Edmonds was shot and killed by police.
2019-01-07	Shatelle Hooks (35)	New York (Utica)	Off duty officer Christofer Kitto of the Albany police department used his handgun to shoot and kill Hooks, who was allegedly attempting to rob Kitto at knife point. Utica police say that they will not charge Kitto with murder, calling it a "justified homicide" in self-defence, but Kitto was arrested for patronizing a prostitute.
2019-01-07	David Novak (35)	Washington (Spokane)	Novak was shot and killed by police.
2019-01-06	Dion Lamar Taylor (20)	Maryland (Baltimore)	Three suspects robbed a pizza delivery driver and stole his vehicle. After a several-mile police pursuit, the three suspects jumped from the vehicle, and Taylor was fatally struck by a Baltimore County Police Department vehicle. A 16-year-old suspect was arrested, and the third fled.
2019-01-06	Andre Gladen (36)	Oregon (Portland)	Gladen was shot and killed by police.
2019-01-06	Kevin Shawn Hanson (42)	West Virginia (Hurricane)	Hanson was shot and killed by police.
2019-01-06	Nil Houer (38)	Texas (Houston)	Houer was shot and killed by police.
2019-01-06	James McDonald (40s)	Oklahoma (Cache)	McDonald was shot and killed by police.
2019-01-05	David John Engebretson (50)	Oregon (Milwaukie)	Engebretson was shot and killed by police.
2019-01-05	Adolfo Gonzalez (28)	California (Lemon Grove)	Gonzalez was shot and killed by police.
2019-01-05	Oliver Hernandez (29)	California (Fresno)	Hernandez was shot and killed by police.
2019-01-05	Shaun Kennedy (54)	California (Santa Clara)	Kennedy was shot and killed by police.
2019-01-05	Harold Thompson (81)	South Carolina (Union County)	Thompson was shot and killed by police.
2019-01-04	John Richard Camacho (27)	Texas (San Marcos)	Camacho was shot and killed by police.
2019-01-04	Jeremy Dean Duncan (39)	Texas (Amarillo)	Duncan was shot and killed by police.
2019-01-04	Lawrence Thompson III (32)	Texas (Houston)	Thompson was shot and killed by police.
2019-01-04	Zonell Williams (33)	Louisiana (New Orleans)	Police responding to a suicide call to a house were confronted by an individual in the doorway, who opened fire at them with a handgun. One of the officers was struck twice in the chest but his bullet-proof vest ensured the injuries were not life threatening. Officers returned fire with their weapons, killing the suspect, who is suspected of committing suicide by cop. The individual was later identified as 33-year-old Zonell Williams.
2019-01-03	Samuel Garcia (39)	Texas (San Antonio)	Garcia was shot and killed by police.
2019-01-03	Jae Wesley Hardy (27)	Alabama (Millbrook)	Hardy was shot and killed by police.
2019-01-03	Robert Myers (63)	New York (Greenport)	Myers was shot and killed by police.
2019-01-03	Abiel Innis De Joel Rios (33)	California (Visalia)	Rios was shot and killed by police.
2019-01-03	Joseph Roberts (27)	Minnesota (Albert Lea)	Roberts was shot and killed by police.
2019-01-03	Eric David Sauerhagen (31)	Montana (Bozeman)	Sauerhagen was shot by police.
2019-01-02	Matthew Burroughs (35)	Ohio (Niles)	Burroughs was shot and killed by police.
2019-01-02	Arron Thomas Lambert (33)	Texas (San Antonio)	Lambert was shot and killed by police.
2019-01-02	Abdoulaye Thiam (20)	Tennessee (Whitehaven)	Thiam was shot and killed by police.
2019-01-01	Iosia Faletogo (36)	Washington (Seattle)	Police pulled over Faletogo in his vehicle for making an unsafe lane change and driving with a suspended license. During the stop Faletogo ran from the vehicle carrying a firearm. A total of 6 police officers caught up and pinned Faletogo as well as knocking his firearm away. During the incident Faletogo allegedly reached for the gun, and one of the officers reacted by fatally shooting him at close range. Faletogo was on parole for drug trafficking and was found to have large sums of cash as well as fentanyl and acetaminophen. A female passenger who was traveling with Faletogo was later released without charge.
2019-01-01	Dylan Michael Smith (26)	North Carolina (Davidson County)	Smith was shot and killed by police.
2019-01-01	Brandon Lovell Webster (28)	North Carolina (Shallotte)	Webster was shot and killed by police.

== See also ==
- Death in custody § United States
- Henry A. Wallace Police Crime Public Database
- List of cases of police brutality
- List of countries with annual rates and counts for killings by law enforcement officers
- List of law enforcement officers killed in the line of duty in the United States
- List of law enforcement officers convicted for an on-duty killing in the United States
- List of police reforms related to the George Floyd protests
- List of unarmed African Americans killed by law enforcement officers in the United States
- Lists of killings by law enforcement officers
- Police brutality in the United States
- Police misconduct § United States
- Police riot § United States
- Police use of deadly force in the United States
