= 2019 Texas shooting =

2019 Texas shooting may refer to:

- 2019 Dallas courthouse shooting – on June 17
- 2019 El Paso shooting – on August 3
- Midland–Odessa shootings – on August 31
- Pecan Park raid – in Houston on January 28

== See also ==
- List of mass shootings in the United States in 2019
