= Chávez High School (Houston) =

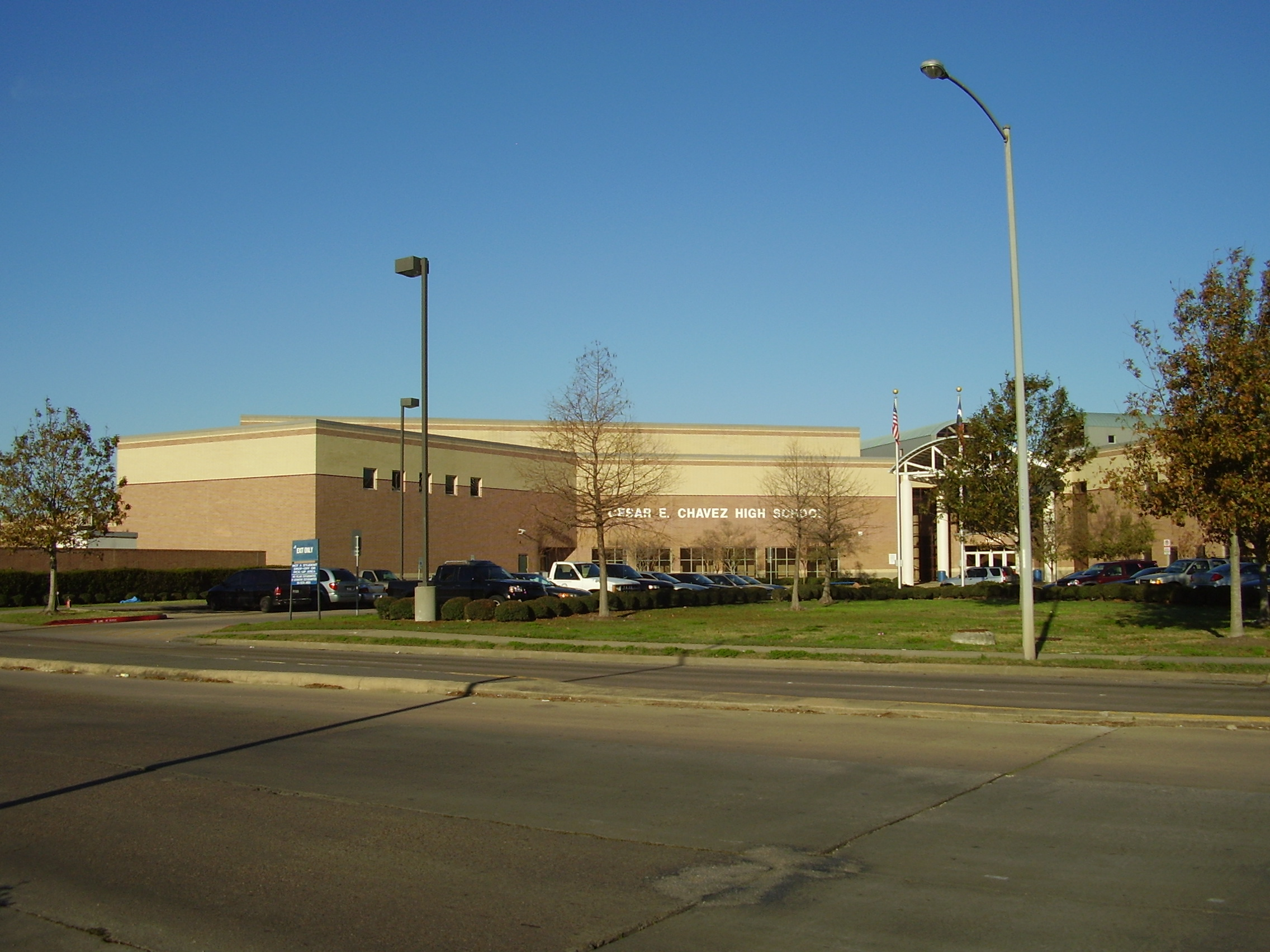

Location
- 8501 Howard Drive; Houston, Texas 77017; United States; 29°41′13″N 95°15′16″W

Information
- Type: Public High School
- Motto: Si Se Puede!
- School district: Houston Independent School District
- Principal: Karol Galindo
- Staff: 128.10 (FTE)
- Grades: 9-12
- Enrollment: 2,006 (2023-2024)
- Student to teacher ratio: 15.66
- Colors: Blue, White, Silver, Black
- Athletics conference: 18-6A
- Nickname: Lobos
- Newspaper: The Paw Print (Defunct)
- Yearbook: CHS Yearbook
- Feeder schools: Cornelius Elementary School; Others listed below
- Website: https://chavez.houstonisd.org/

César E. Chávez High School is a secondary school located at 8501 Howard Drive in the Allendale neighborhood in Houston, Texas, United States.

The school is part of the Houston Independent School District, and serves grades nine through twelve. Chavez serves several areas outside the 610 Loop in southeast Houston, including the neighborhoods of Glenbrook Valley, Gulf Freeway Oaks, and Park Place.

Chavez High School serves a mainly Hispanic population located near Hobby Airport. The school is named for civil rights activist Cesar E. Chavez.

HISD's Environmental Science magnet program is offered at Chavez. The school's principal (as of June 2025) is Ms. Karol Galindo. The "Lobo" (Spanish for "wolf") is the school's official mascot.

The school became an International Baccalaureate school which started offering Diploma Programme classes in 2017-2018.

== History ==
By 1991 the East End area schools Austin High School and Milby High School had among the largest enrollments in Texas. In December of that year school district trustees voted to construct a new high school in September 1995 instead of 1997 due to the severity of overcrowding. By 1997 the new high school had not yet been constructed; area community leaders and parents anticipated the construction of Chávez as Austin and Milby were still overcrowded.

In the fall of 2000, Chávez opened and took most of Milby's traditional neighborhoods. In turn Milby absorbed some students from Austin.

A group called the Unidos Contra Environmental Racism (UCER) protested the school's proximity to many chemical plants before it was opened; the school is less than .25 miles (0.40 km) from plants owned by Texas Petroleum, Denka Chemical, USS Chemical, and Goodyear Chemical. Juan Parras, the leader of the UCER group, stated that the school would take the brunt of a chemical leak. Heather Browne, a spokesperson for Houston ISD, stated that the Chavez site was tested for environmental hazards in the air and soil in 1992 and 1996; no problems were found in the tests. Browne also stated that one park, three public swimming pools, the City Hall of South Houston, and one golf course are within 2 miles (3.2 km) of Chavez.

In 2007, an Associated Press/Johns Hopkins University study referred to Chávez as a "dropout factory" where at least 40% of the entering freshman class does not make it to their senior year. During that year 21% of high school age children zoned to Chávez chose to attend a different Houston ISD school.

In 2014, HISD superintendent Terry Grier stated that Chávez should reduce its enrollment to around 3,000 students.

== Operations ==
Students at Chávez use the former Kay Elementary School in Harrisburg as a "land lab".

== Demographics ==
For the 2022-23 school year:

- African American: 7.2%
- Hispanic: 87.9%
- White: 1.2%
- American Indian: 0.1%
- Asian: 3.2%
- Pacific Islander: 0.1%
- Two or More Races: 0.2%
- Economically Disadvantaged: 93.2%

As of 2009 Chávez's enrollment mostly consists of low income Hispanic and Latino students.

== AP Courses Offered at Chávez ==
- AP World History: Modern
- AP United States History
- AP English Language and Composition
- AP English Literature and Composition
- AP Spanish Language and Culture
- AP Macroeconomics
- AP United States Government and Politics
- AP Calculus AB
- AP Calculus BC
- AP Chemistry
- AP Physics
- AP Biology
- AP Environmental Science
- AP Computer Science

== Athletics and Arts ==
Chavez fields eighteen varsity teams in the University Interscholastic League's Region III, District 20-6A. The campus has a field house that includes an athletic training room, weight room, team meeting rooms, coaches' offices, coaches and officials' lockers, and large locker room areas for male and female athletes. Other campus athletic facilities include an 8-lane all-weather track, 4 tennis courts, an outdoor basketball court, a practice gymnasium, basketball court, secondary weight room, natatorium with olympic-sized competition pool, football, baseball, softball, soccer fields, and a cross country running course over wooded terrain.

Varsity sports offered at the school (as of 2026) include:

- Cross Country (boys, girls)
- Volleyball (girls)
- Football (boys)
- Soccer (boys, girls)
- Swim & Water Polo (boys, girls)
- Baseball (boys)
- Softball (girls)
- Basketball (boys, girls)
- Wrestling (boys, girls)
- Track & Field (boys, girls)

Chavez High School (as of 2024) offers only Band & Mariachi classes, though, previously offered Piano, Choir, Jazz & Orchestra The Chavez Band is known as, "The Mighty Lobo Marching Band" The Chavez Mariachi is known as, "Mariachi Si Se Puede!" Chavez also has a Theatre program that consists of acting, musical theatre, and tech.

Also, Army JROTC (Junior Reserve Officer Training Corps).

== In media ==
In the 2011 novel What Can't Wait, the sports team of the Houston high school attended by the main character is the "Loyal Lobos". Chávez High's real-life mascot is the "Lobos", and the novel's author, Ashley Hope Pérez, once worked as a teacher at Chávez. In the acknowledgements section Pérez thanked the students of Chávez High.

== Feeder pattern ==
Elementary schools that feed into Chavez include:

- Bonner
- Park Place
- Patterson
- Cornelius (partial)
- Lewis (partial)
- Rucker (partial)
- Sanchez (partial)

Middle schools that feed into Chavez include:

- Ortiz
- Deady (partial)
- Stevenson (partial)

== Notable alumni ==
- Juan Díaz - World Boxing Association's Lightweight Champion
- Michael Brockers - American football defensive tackle
- Vanessa Guillén - US Army soldier who was killed by another soldier at Fort Hood on April 22, 2020
