= Murder of Vanessa Guillén =

2020 murder of a U.S. army soldier

- Fort Hood census-designated place
- Location: Fort Hood, Texas, U.S.
- Date: April 22, 2020; 6 years ago
- Attack type: Murder by bludgeoning, murder-suicide
- Weapon: Hammer
- Deaths: 2 (including the perpetrator two months later)
- Victim: Vanessa Guillén
- Perpetrator: Aaron David Robinson
- Motive: Cover-up of Robinson’s harassment and sexual assault of Guillén
- Convictions: Aguilar: Accessory after-the-fact, making false statements (3 counts) (Note: Dropped charges as part of a plea deal: Conspiracy to tamper with documents or proceedings; Tampering with documents or proceedings (2 counts); Accessory after the fact (2 counts); Destruction, alteration, or falsification of records in a federal investigation; Making false statements)
- Sentence: Aguilar: 30 years in prison
- Convicted: Cecily Anne Aguilar

The murder of Vanessa Guillén, a 20-year-old United States Army soldier, took place inside an armory at Fort Hood, Texas, on April 22, 2020, when she was bludgeoned to death by another soldier, Aaron David Robinson. Guillén had been missing for more than two months before some of her dismembered, burned remains were found buried along the Leon River on June 30. Robinson fled Fort Hood after learning of the discovery. When law enforcement tried to apprehend him in nearby Killeen, Texas, he fatally shot himself.

Cecily Aguilar, a local woman identified as Robinson's girlfriend, was taken into custody for assisting him in dismembering and burying Guillén's body. On July 2, 2020, Aguilar was charged with one federal count of conspiracy to tamper with evidence. On July 13, 2021, she was indicted on eleven counts by a federal grand jury. On November 29, 2022, Aguilar pleaded guilty to accessory to murder after the fact and three counts of making a false statement. On August 14, 2023, Aguilar was sentenced to the maximum of 30 years for her role in covering up the murder of Guillén.

Guillén had long had the goal of serving in the Army but, after being assigned to Fort Hood, told friends and family of being sexually harassed by a superior. She did not report it officially for fear of retaliation, as such reports were supposed to go through the chain of command..

== People involved ==
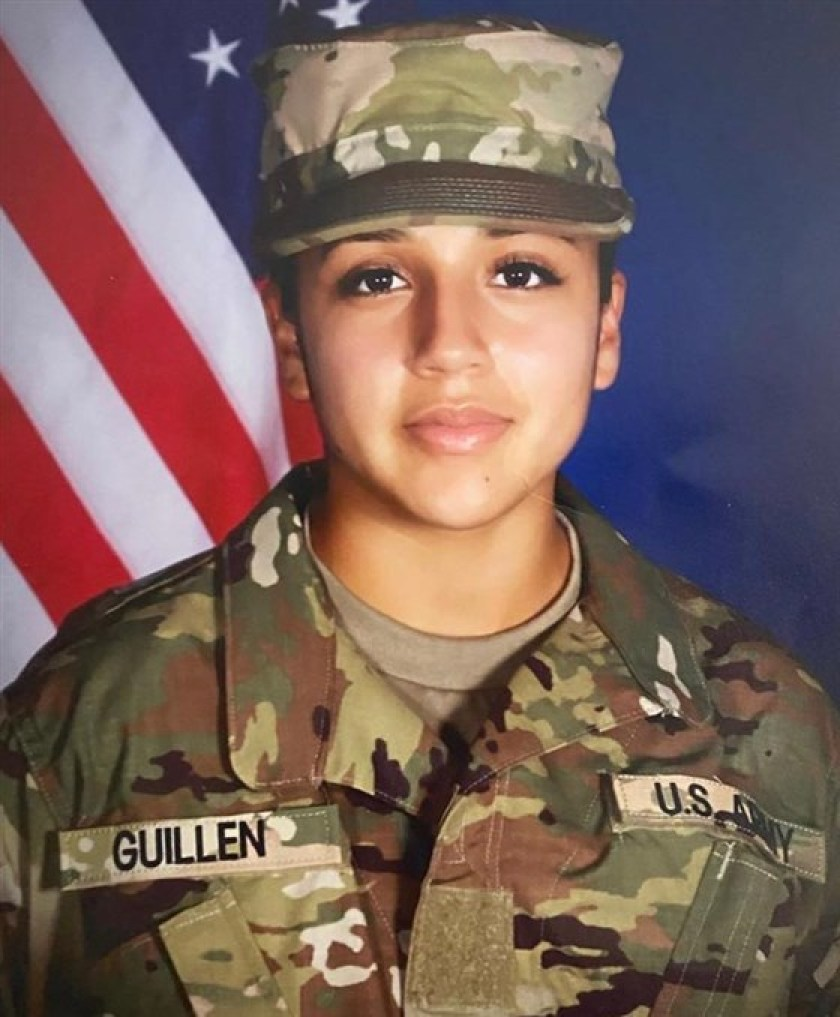
Vanessa Guillén in 2018

=== Victim ===
- Vanessa Guillén, 20, was from Houston, Texas. She was born in Ben Taub Hospital in Houston on September 30, 1999, to parents Rogelio and Gloria Guillén, who originated from Zacatecas State in Mexico. She had five siblings. Guillén attended Hartman Middle School. According to her family, she graduated from César E. Chávez High School in 2018 in the top 15% of her class. She played soccer, loved to jog, and enjoyed sports and learning.

Satisfying a long-term goal, Guillén joined the United States Army in June 2018. She trained as a 91F, Small Arms and Artillery Repairer, and was stationed at Fort Hood, Texas. Guillén was posthumously advanced from private first class to the rank of specialist on July 1, 2020.

=== Perpetrators ===
- Aaron David Robinson, 20, was from Calumet City, Illinois, a southern suburb of Chicago. Robinson joined the United States Army in October 2017 and trained as a 12B, Combat Engineer. He held the rank of specialist at the time of his death and was Guillén's supervisor.
- Cecily Anne Aguilar, 22, described by authorities as Robinson's girlfriend, was the estranged wife of another soldier, whom she had married in May 2018.

== Investigation ==
Guillén was stationed at Fort Hood, a U.S. Army installation in Bell County, Texas. About 340 square miles (880 km^{2}) in size, it is one of the military's largest installations. It is home to III Corps and the First Cavalry Division.

She was last seen around 1:00 pm on April 22, 2020, in the parking lot of her unit, the Regimental Engineer Squadron Headquarters of the 3rd Cavalry Regiment (3CR). Her car keys, identification card, bank card, and barracks key were found inside the armory where she worked. Guillén's family believed that she would not have left these items behind voluntarily and thought suspicious circumstances existed. The case was initially investigated under the jurisdiction of the U.S. Army Criminal Investigation Command (CID) and the Federal Bureau of Investigation (FBI) with local law enforcement agencies in Bell County, Killeen, and Belton; the Texas Parks and Wildlife Department; the United States Marshals Service; and the Texas Ranger Division in support. Multiple Fort Hood units, including 3CR, began searching the area within two weeks of her disappearance.

Before Guillén went missing, she had told her family that she was being sexually harassed by an unnamed sergeant at Fort Hood, and that complaints made by other female soldiers against the sergeant had been dismissed by officials. Guillén's mother advised her to report the matter, but she responded that "she could put a stop to it herself". Guillén said she feared retaliation if she made a report. Her mother was at risk as an undocumented migrant.

In early June, Guillén's mother told reporters she did not trust the Army's handling of the investigation. Her attorney, Natalie Khawam, said she believed the family was "being kept in the dark"; the Army had released few details regarding the young soldier's disappearance.

On June 13, 2020, hundreds of people assembled at the gates of Fort Hood to protest what the family and supporters believed was a lack of information on the case. CID reported that they found no evidence that Guillén was assaulted, but said investigators believed foul play was involved in her disappearance.

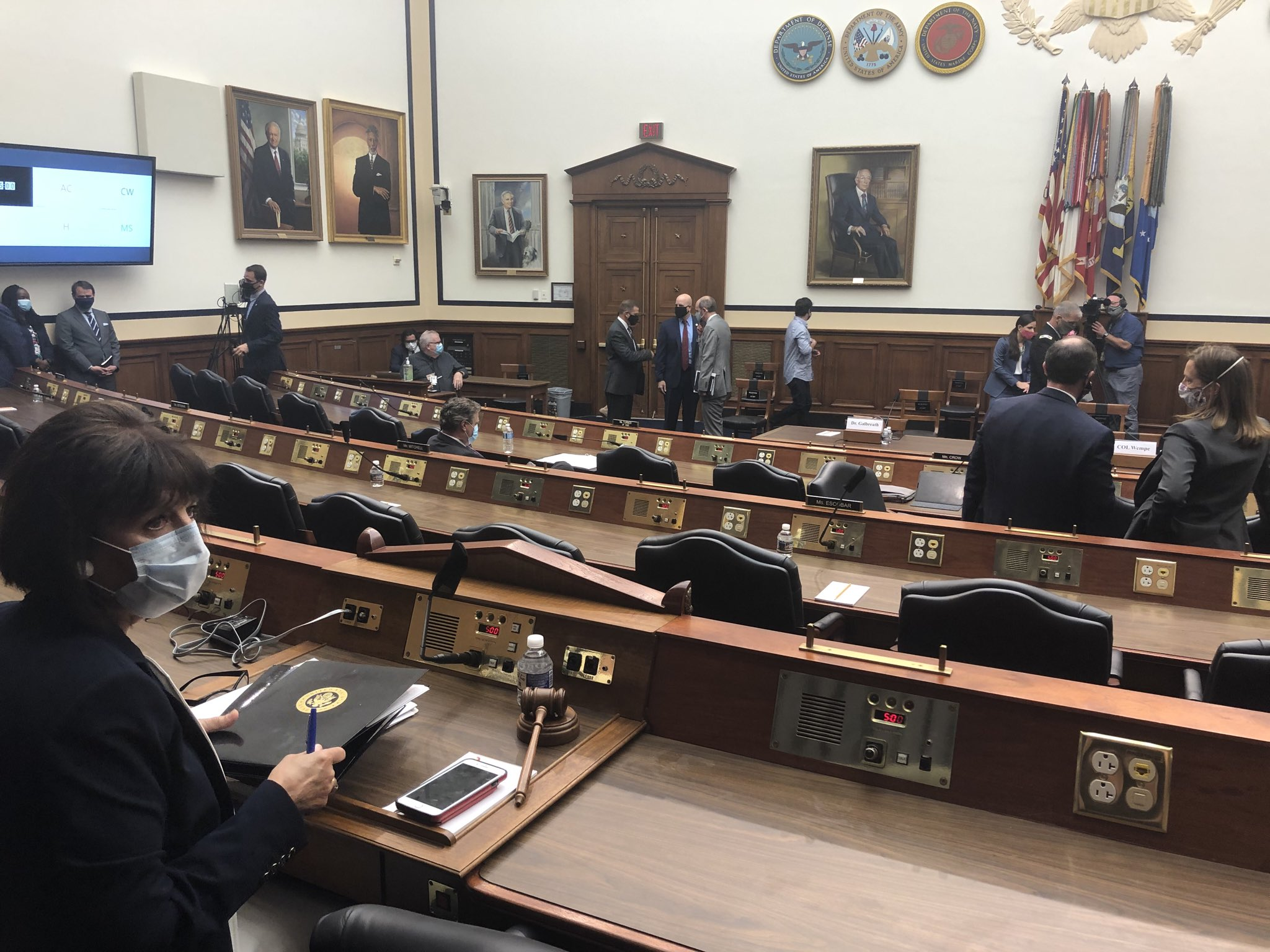
A United States House Armed Services Subcommittee on Military Personnel hearing, chaired by Jackie Speier, was held in July 2020 about the killing of Guillén after her remains were found.

On June 17, the League of United Latin American Citizens added a $25,000 reward to the existing $25,000 reward announced by the Army for finding Guillén.

On June 23, Congresswoman Sylvia Garcia, in whose district Guillén's family lived, met with Fort Hood officials to discuss the ongoing search. The authorities said that more than 300 interviews had been conducted, and they spent more than 10,000 hours investigating Guillén's disappearance. On July 27, 2020, Guillén's mother, who had previously been detained for illegal immigration, was granted parole in place by the U.S. Department of Homeland Security through the assistance of Garcia and immigration attorney Luis Gomez Alfaro.

=== Discovery of remains ===
On June 30, 2020, Army investigators were called in when private contractors discovered partial human remains along the Leon River in Belton. The area had previously been searched by Texas Rangers, detectives, and cadaver dogs on June 20 after a burn mound was discovered nearby. Investigators theorized that the remains, previously buried under concrete, had been dug up by wildlife. Tim Miller, Director of Texas EquuSearch, stated that it was the most sophisticated burial site he had ever seen.

Later that evening, at around 8:30 pm, authorities reinterviewed Cecily Anne Aguilar, a local woman. She was estranged from her husband, a soldier at Fort Hood. Aguilar was reported to be the girlfriend of Aaron David Robinson, a specialist-ranked enlisted soldier who was one of the last people known to have seen Guillén on the day of her disappearance. He had previously been interviewed by investigators. Aguilar told police that Robinson had confessed to her that he had killed a female soldier at Fort Hood. At the request of law enforcement, Aguilar placed a controlled telephone call to Robinson, who said, "Baby, they found pieces", and texted Robinson multiple news articles. He did not deny any facts of the articles. According to a criminal complaint filed in the Western District Court of Texas, Aguilar allegedly helped Robinson dismember and dispose of Guillén's body on April 22, 2020, after Robinson told her he had bludgeoned the soldier to death with a hammer inside the armory.

A number of other soldiers had recently been reported missing at Fort Hood. During the course of the search for Vanessa Guillén, the remains of two other soldiers were discovered. Pvt. Mejhor Morta, 26, of Pensacola, Florida, was pronounced dead shortly after the discovery of his body near Stillhouse Hollow Lake on July 17. The body of Pvt. Gregory Wedel-Morales, 23, was discovered June 19 buried in a field at the end of a Killeen cul-de-sac.

=== Arrests ===
On the evening of June 30, Robinson escaped the custody of an unarmed guard from his unit. He fled Fort Hood after having learned of the discovery of remains. He had been detained by his unit at the request of a CID agent under the pretense of violating COVID-19 quarantine rules. In the early hours of July 1, Killeen police located Robinson, who killed himself with a handgun before he could be taken into custody.

Aguilar was arrested by Texas Rangers and held at the Bell County Jail. On July 2, Bell County officials stated Aguilar would be transferred to federal custody due to being charged with one count of conspiracy to tamper with evidence by the United States Attorney's Office for the Western District of Texas. Assistant United States Attorneys Mark Frazier and Greg Gloff prosecuted the case on behalf of the federal government.

=== Motive ===
On May 24, 2022, the Texas Department of Public Safety released a report stating, "Aguilar later explained why Robinson killed Guillén, saying Guillén saw Robinson's cellphone lock screen, which contained a picture of Aguilar. (Robinson) told her he was worried about getting in trouble for violating the Army's fraternization rules, since Aguilar was still married to another soldier, (so) he hit Guillén in the head with a hammer."

== Memorials ==
A mural in honor of Guillén was created in her hometown of Houston by a local artist. The mural portrays her with the flags of both the United States and Mexico, the latter due to her Mexican American ethnicity. Another mural is dedicated to her at Taqueria del Sol in the Park Place neighborhood.

Multiple people have written corridos (songs) about her.

On July 6, 2020, at city hall in Richmond, California, a memorial of candles, along with tea lights spelling out "Vanessa", were displayed in front of a makeshift altar. Hundreds of people gathered to honor Guillén and other victims of sexual violence and mistreatment within the military.

On April 19, 2021, Lieutenant General Robert P. White, commander of III Corps and Fort Hood, unveiled that one out of the 27 gates that grant entry to Fort Hood will be renamed the "Vanessa Guillén Gate" with a plaque in her honor. The gate is the main entry point to the 3rd Cavalry Regiment, where Guillén worked in an arms room as a small-arms repairer.

In 2022, the Park Place post office in Houston was renamed after Guillén.

== Later developments ==
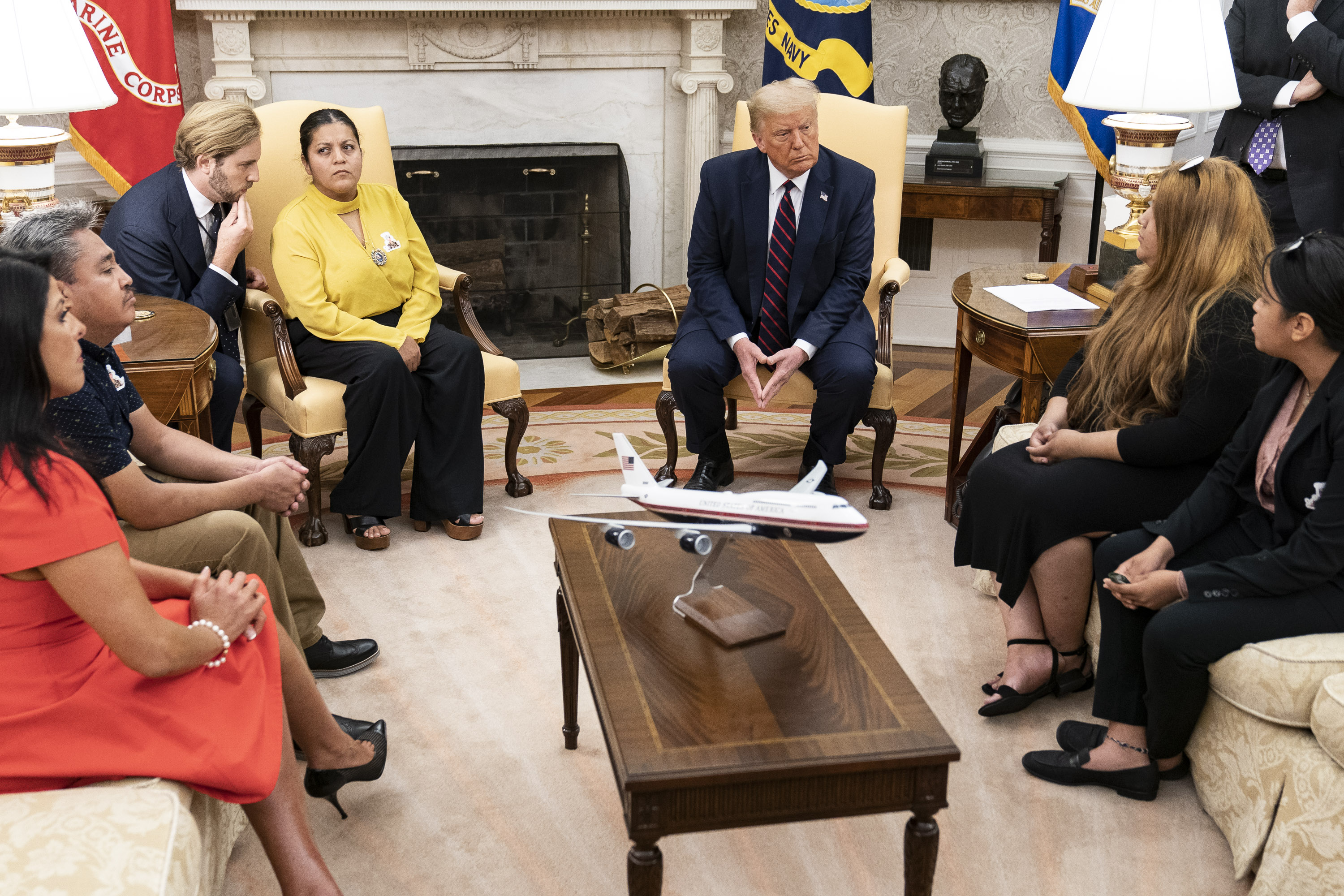
President Donald Trump meets with the family of Vanessa Guillén in the Oval Office on July 30, 2020.

Guillén's family called for justice and improvement of the way claims of sexual harassment are handled by the military. Guillén's mother stated publicly that she had spoken to witnesses who heard two shots at the moment of Robinson's death, and said she believed that Robinson was executed by authorities as part of a coverup involving senior members of the military.

On July 10, 2020, the Secretary of the Army Ryan D. McCarthy announced that he would order a "full independent review" of Guillén's case.

On July 30, 2020, Guillen's family met with President Donald Trump regarding her murder.

On December 8, 2020, McCarthy announced the results of the investigation, and disciplined 14 U.S. commanders and other leaders at Fort Hood, citing multiple "leadership failures". The investigation found that there was a "permissive environment for sexual assault and sexual harassment at Fort Hood." Among those disciplined by McCarthy were Major General Scott L. Efflandt, Colonel Ralph Overland, and Command Sergeant Major Bradley Knapp. The Army suspended Major General Jeffery Broadwater and Command Sergeant Major Thomas C. Kenny, pending the outcome of a new investigation into the 1st Cavalry Division's command climate and program for preventing and responding to sexual harassment and assault. Disciplinary measures were also taken against soldiers and leaders assigned below brigade level, but the Army does not, as a matter of policy, "...release the names of the battalion level and below commanders and leaders who received administrative action".

During the December 8 Pentagon press conference, McCarthy said that Guillén's murder "shocked our conscience and brought attention to deeper problems" at Fort Hood and across the Army more widely. He said it "forced us to take a critical look at our systems, our policies, and ourselves."

Broadwater did not receive any disciplinary action following an investigation of the 1st Cavalry Division's command climate; he turned command of the division over to Major General John B. Richardson in July 2021. Broadwater was subsequently assigned as deputy commander of V Corps at Fort Knox, Kentucky.

=== Civil suit ===
In August 2022, the Guillén family filed a civil lawsuit against the United States Army, seeking $35 million in damages for the sexual harassment, assault, and wrongful death of their daughter Vanessa while serving in the military.

== Legislation named for Guillén ==
- On June 1, 2021, Texas Governor Greg Abbott signed SB 623 into law, also known as the Vanessa Guillén Act. It was introduced by state senator Cesar Blanco (D), named to honor Guillén, and had bipartisan support. It sets up procedures so that military service members can report sexual harassment or assault by other members outside the chain of command, to protect their safety and avoid retaliation.
- In late December 2021, President Joe Biden signed the National Defense Authorization Act, which also enacted provisions of the I Am Vanessa Guillén Act, named in honor of the murdered soldier at Fort Hood. The new law, which took effect on January 1, 2022, made changes to military justice to have sexual harassment investigations and decisions to prosecute made outside service members' command structure. In addition, service members are to be protected against retaliation for making complaints or reports of sexual harassment, as it has been reported as occurring at times by superiors.
- On January 26, 2022, President Biden signed Executive Order 14062, which established sexual harassment as a specific offense under the Uniform Code of Military Justice.

=== Representation in other media ===
- ABC 20/20 presented an episode titled "I Am Vanessa", (season 42/episode 34 - Sept. 11, 2020), about Guillen, her murder at Fort Hood, and the investigation.
- In November 2022, the documentary I Am Vanessa Guillen was released for streaming on Netflix. It was directed by Christy Wegener and produced by Wegener, Isabel Castro, Lindsey Cordero, and Armando Croda. It presents the lives of Guillén and her family, and documents their effort to get her disappearance investigated and receive answers from the military, to raise awareness of issues related to missing soldiers in the military and sexual assault and harassment, and their efforts, with attorney Natalie Khawam, to gain legislation to change how the military handles sexual harassment and related issues. The title comes from a social-media campaign following the family's release of her claims of sexual harassment before her death.

== Controversy over funeral costs ==
Jeffrey Goldberg, editor of The Atlantic, alleged in an October 2024 article that former President Donald Trump had committed to paying for Guillén's funeral, only to oppose it later. According to two anonymous sources and contemporaneous notes taken by one of the participants present at the meeting, during an Oval Office meeting, Trump became angry when he discovered the cost, stating, "It doesn't cost 60,000 bucks to bury a fucking Mexican!" and ordered his chief of staff, Mark Meadows, not to pay the cost. However this source was discredited since they were not in the meeting, relayed it second hand, and those in the meeting adamantly denied the claim. According to another unnamed source, Trump remained agitated later in the day, reportedly saying, "Can you believe it? Fucking people, trying to rip me off."

Trump campaign spokesperson Alex Pfeiffer and Meadows offered accounts that differed, stating that Trump did not make the remarks that Goldberg alleged. In response to Goldberg's report, Guillén's sister Mayra responded on X that his story was "exploiting" her sister's death for politics, and said, "President Donald Trump did nothing but show respect to my family and Vanessa." Guillén family lawyer Natalie Khawam, who was not present at the meeting in question, confirmed that a bill had been sent to the White House, but that no money had ever been received. However, Khawam accused Goldberg of misrepresenting her clients' treatment by the Trump administration. Khawam stated that Goldberg "used and exploited" her clients "for cheap political gain," and that the timing of the article, two weeks before a pivotal presidential election and four years after the alleged events, was "quite suspicious".

== See also ==
- List of solved missing person cases (2020s)
- Me Too movement
- Murder of Tracie McBride – kidnapping and murder of a soldier from a military base in Texas
- Sexual harassment in the military
