= Pecan Park, Houston =

Neighborhood in Houston, Texas, U.S.

Coordinates: 29.710°N 95.285°W

Pecan Park is a neighborhood in Houston, Texas.

Pecan Park is located approximately 6 miles (9.7 km) south of downtown Houston inside Interstate 610, known as "The Loop", to the east of Interstate 45 in the East End, Houston area. The name Pecan Park generally refers to the larger neighborhood, of which there are over 30 individual subdivisions, with Pecan Park being the largest. The typical size of the lots is 5,000 square feet (460 m^{2}) and the average size of the homes is 1,100–1,600 square feet (100–150 m^{2}). The Gulfgate Center, formerly the Gulfgate Mall, is located just south of the Gulf Freeway from Pecan Park. The neighborhood is served by the Pecan Park Civic Association.

This area also includes Ingrando Park, home of Dixie Little League. It also has a local library, the Lucille Yvonne Melcher branch of the Houston Public Library system.

== History ==
The heart of the area was once a pecan orchard dating back to the late 19th century with platting of lots for sale by the Magnolia Park Land Company beginning in 1926. The original streets were paved in shell, with asphalt paving becoming widespread during the 1930s and 1940s, when the majority of the homes in the area were constructed. The area was nearly completely built out by 1955, with the homes being examples of typical middle class residential architecture for Houston at the time; Bungalow, both brick and wood sided, Cape Cod (house), early Ranch-style houses and many mildly Tudor influenced English Cottages. Between 1980 and 1990 the area gained 1,000 to 3,500 people per square mile.

The Pecan Park raid occurred in 2019.

== Demographics ==
As of 2015 the Pecan Park Super Neighborhood had 16,245 residents, with 9,762 persons per square mile. 92% were Hispanic, 3% were non-Hispanic whites, 2% were non-Hispanic blacks, 2% were non-Hispanic Asians, and zero were others.. In 2000 the area had had 19,230 residents, with 11,584 persons per square mile. 90% were Hispanic, 5% were non-Hispanic white, 3% were non-Hispanic black, and 2% were non-Hispanic Asian.

== Education ==
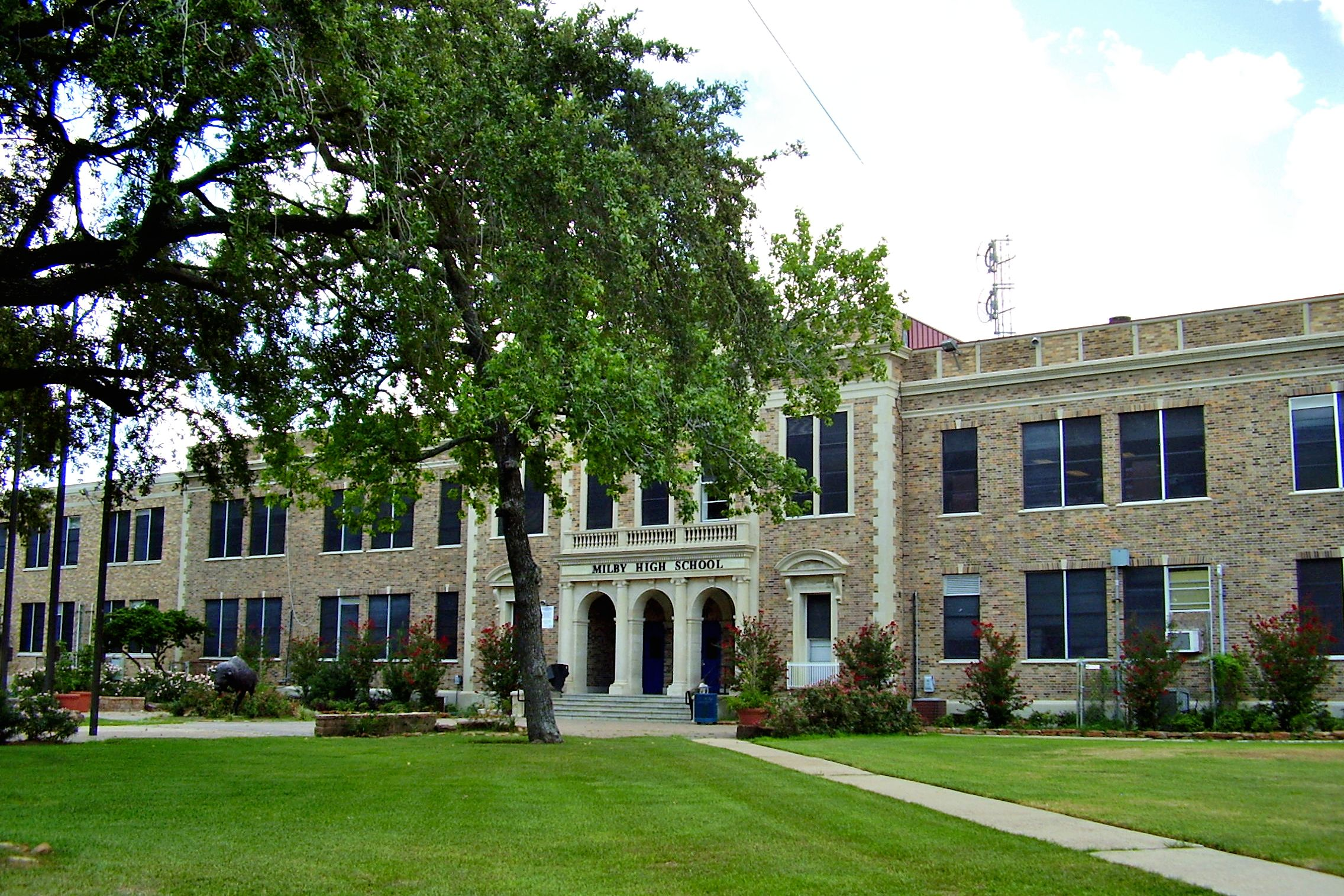
Milby High School

Pecan Park proper and the Pecan Park Super Neighborhood are zoned to Houston ISD schools. Three different elementary schools serve sections of Pecan Park proper: Southmayd, Davila, and Crespo. In addition, Sanchez Elementary School serves parts of the Pecan Park Super Neighborhood. All residents of the Pecan Park Super Neighborhood are zoned to Deady Middle School and Milby High School.

Houston Community College's Eastside Campus is located on the edge of the neighborhood near the Gulf Freeway.

Lucile Yvonne Melcher Library of Houston Public Library, named after a woman who established a children's literature fund, is in the super neighborhood. Although the branch was closed for five years due to damage from Hurricane Harvey, as of August 2021, it is open to the public once again.

== Infrastructure ==
The Harris Health System (formerly Harris County Hospital District) designated the Ripley Health Center for the ZIP code 77012, while Martin Luther King Health Center is designated for ZIP code 77087. In 2000 Ripley was replaced by the Gulfgate Health Center. The designated public hospital is Ben Taub General Hospital in the Texas Medical Center.

== Free Wireless ==
In 2005 Pecan Park was the first area in the United States to provide a super wireless hotspot for free or at a low cost. The service currently offers internet access close to 20,000 residents. Rice University students collaborated with the non-profit organization Technology for All (TFA).

== Metro routes ==
Getting to Pecan Park can be accessed on the METRO (Houston) system on Bus 76, which travels north to south on Evergreen Dr, and also on Bus 50, which travels also north to south on Broadway Blvd. Both routes have access to the Magnolia Transit Center on Harrisburg for additional transportation and also access to the METRORail Green Line when completed in late 2014.

== Parks and recreation ==
Ingrando Park, named after Frank and Jennie Ingrando and originally named Southmayd Park, is in the Super Neighborhood and has about 16.2575 acres (6.5792 ha) of area along Plum Creek. The city of Houston bought the property for $14,866 from a couple from Campbell, California, Malcolm and Nellie Sprague, on August 23, 1944. The city government gave it its current name as per a September 22, 1971 resolution, and the namesakes donated $100,000 for improvement of the park. Originally the park had 14.688 acres (5.944 ha) of space, but on September 18, 1996, the city government by ordinance acquired an additional 1.3915 acres (0.5631 ha) for $96,129.25 after Houston City Council member Gracie Saenz began advocating for its expansion two years prior. The estate of Eunice H. Johnson and the Will Frank Johnson Trust funded the 1996 acquisition. The Texas Parks and Wildlife Department (TPWD) funded additional improvements with a matching grant.
