= Alton Ford =

American basketball player (1981–2018)

Personal information
- Born: May 29, 1981 Houston, Texas, U.S.
- Died: April 2, 2018 (aged 36) Pearland, Texas, U.S.
- Listed height: 6 ft 10 in (2.08 m)
- Listed weight: 264 lb (120 kg)

Career information
- High school: Milby (Houston, Texas)
- College: Houston (2000–2001)
- NBA draft: 2001: 2nd round, 51st overall pick
- Drafted by: Phoenix Suns
- Playing career: 2001–2011
- Position: Center
- Number: 4, 1

Career history
- 2001–2003: Phoenix Suns
- 2003–2004: Houston Rockets
- 2004: ASVEL
- 2004–2005: Fujian Xunxing
- 2005–2006: Anwil Włocławek
- 2007–2008: Igokea
- 2008–2009: Rio Grande Valley Vipers
- 2009: Xinjiang Flying Tigers
- 2009: Reno Bighorns
- 2010: Bourg-en-Bresse
- 2011: Erie BayHawks

Career highlights
- McDonald's All-American (2000); Second-team Parade All-American (2000); Third-team Parade All-American (1999)
- Stats at NBA.com
- Stats at Basketball Reference

Alton Ford Jr. (May 29, 1981 – April 2, 2018) was an American professional basketball player who played in the National Basketball Association and other leagues. He last played for the NBA D-League team the Erie BayHawks.

Ford was born in Houston, Texas and attended Houston ISD Milby High School.

He was selected 51st overall in the 2001 NBA draft by the Phoenix Suns. He played with the Phoenix Suns from 2001 to 2003, and then with the Houston Rockets in the 2003-04 NBA season. Ford played a total of 73 NBA games (64 for Phoenix and 9 for Houston) with career averages of 2.5 points and 1.7 rebounds. His final NBA game was on January 3, 2004, in an 84–63 win over the Utah Jazz where he played for a little under 2 minutes and recorded no stats.

He played overseas from 2004 to 2008.

== Personal life and death ==
Ford and his wife, Victoria had four children.

Ford died of lymphoma, a form of blood cancer, on April 2, 2018. He was 36. His funeral was held on April 5, 2018.
