= Glenbrook Valley, Houston =

Subdivision in Houston, Texas, United States

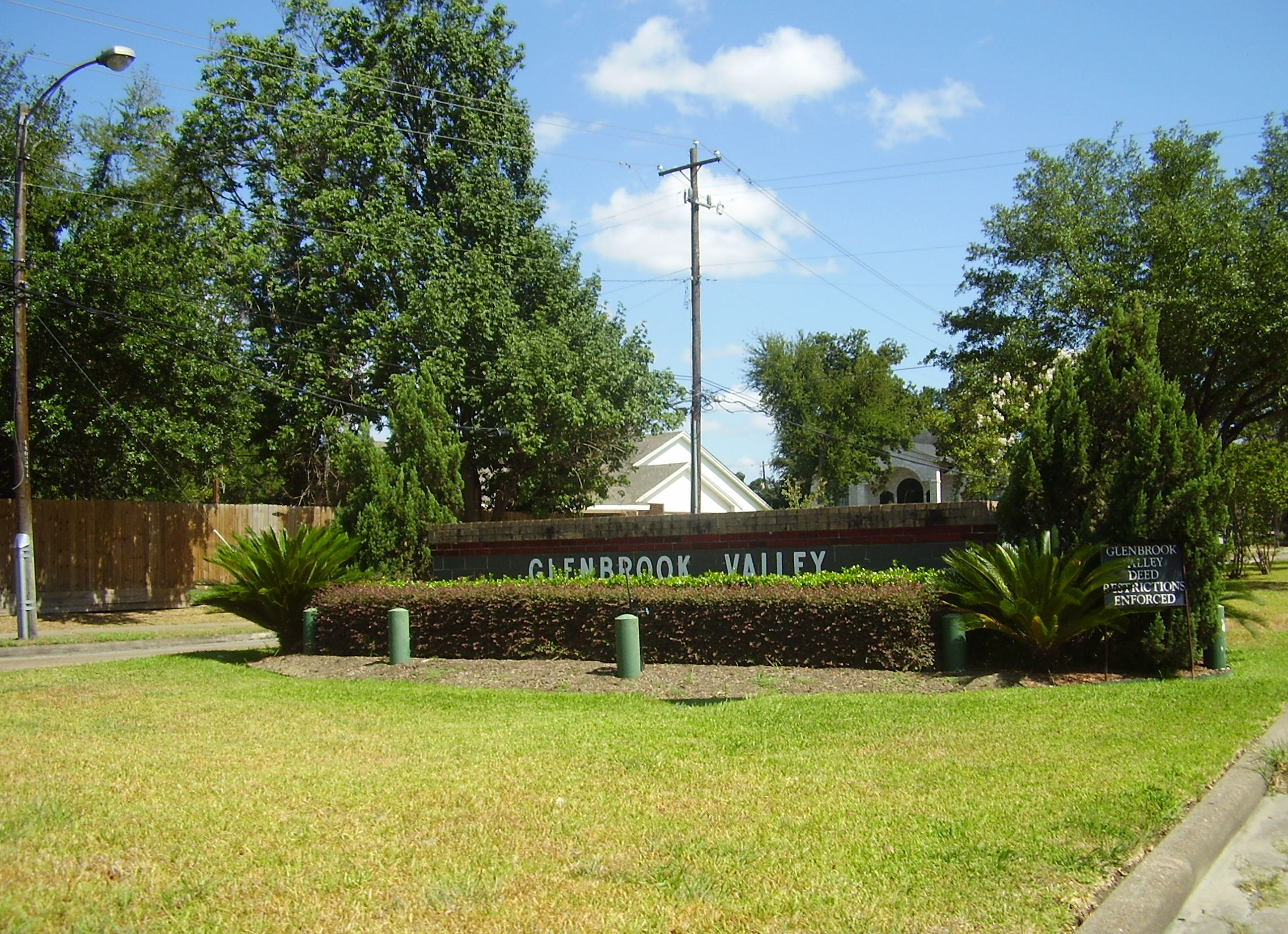
Glenbrook Valley

Glenbrook Valley is a subdivision located in Houston, Texas, United States.

Glenbrook Valley was developed by Fred McManis, Jr.

== History ==
Glenbrook Valley was developed from 1953 to 1962. Hare and Hare, architects from Kansas City, Missouri, designed the community for Fred McManus, the developer.

The first section opened in 1954; the original six homes were featured in the 1954 "Parade of Homes," a program sponsored by the Greater Houston Builders Association. At one time in the neighborhood's history, it was known by Houstonians as the "Little River Oaks." Better Homes and Gardens referred to one of the six "Parade of Homes" model houses as "the model home for all America". The Houston Press said "Glenbrook Valley was a showpiece suburb, a mod vision of the glorious George Jetson age to come."

As time passed, Houston's development focused westward. The Houston Press stated that this phenomenon caused "affluent east side outposts like [Glenbrook Valley] to wither in obscurity for decades." The 1980s oil bust started an economic decline in the community. Many older residents left their houses, causing many of them to have a lack of maintenance.

In 2007 Ruth Samuelson of the Houston Press said that "According to several members of the Glenbrook Valley Civic Club, Thai Xuan Village is like a mini Vietnamese nation state smack-dab in the middle of Houston. Residents live by their own laws, and no one intervenes," In February 2007, residents of Glenbrook Valley complained to Mayor of Houston Bill White about the condition of the nearby Thai Xuan Village condominium complex. Robert Searcy, a realtor and a member of the Glenbrook Valley civic club, said that Thai Xuan Village was impacting the property values of Glenbrook Valley.

Glenbrook Valley was, in the Houston Press's 2009 rankings, the "Best Hidden Neighborhood" of Houston. During that year, the Houston Press stated that "hip, young-ish Houstonians" began focusing on eastside neighborhoods because many westside neighborhoods had become expensive. In 2010, the Houston Press nominated Glenbrook Valley as one of Houston's Most Underrated Neighborhoods. Richard Connelly, of that publication, said "The neighborhood's webpage embraces the `60s feeling, and residents there have been resolute in preserving the history of the place."

In 2008 members of the Glenbrook Valley Civic Club and Searcy began a campaign to make Glenbrook Valley a municipally-designated historic district. It would be the first designated historic neighborhood in the state of Texas consisting of post-World War II structures. Volunteers asked residents to sign a petition approving or not approving the designation; According to Marlene Gafrick, the director of the Planning and Development Department of the City of Houston, 54% of Glenbrook Valley residents signed the petition; a 51% approval was necessary to approve the historic district designation. Accusations of foul play among the pro-historic district and anti-historic district sides caused political turmoil within the community. In June 2011 the Houston City Council designated Glenbrook Valley as the city's first historic neighborhood outside of the 610 Loop.

== Cityscape ==
Glenbrook Valley has 1,256 houses in thirteen sections. It is located on the south side of the Sims Bayou. The neighborhood has four quadrants, divided by the intersection of Bellfort Avenue and Broadway Boulevard. William P. Hobby Airport, the Sims Bayou, Telephone Road, and Interstate 45 (Gulf Freeway) roughly form the community's boundaries. The Houston Press stated in 2009 that "it reminds us of a much more stylish Sharpstown, with houses that would do a Mad Men [sic] character proud set on lots practically the size of small farms." Ruth Samuelson of the Houston Press said "The quiet, winding streets behind Broadway are lined with mid-century modern houses and neatly trimmed lawns."

Glenbrook Valley consists of many post-World War II houses. Because an economic decline beginning with the 1980s oil bust had affected Glenbrook Valley and because the community continued to have certain deed restrictions, by 2011 developers of newer houses did not operate in Glenbrook Valley. Steve Jansen of the Houston Press said during that year "Though some unique homes were remodeled beyond original recognition, a passerby won't see McMansions and loftzillas. Instead, home shoppers can find a spacious dwelling (which may need $20,000 in upgrades) and a sizable chunk of land for as low as $190,000." ($271930.47 in current money, upgrades would be $28624.26 in current money) Robert Searcy, a realtor quoted in a 2011 Houston Press article, said that Glenbrook Valley was "an area that sits almost untouched, like a time capsule." Searcy added that many people looking for houses in Greater Houston have a "southeast side vertigo" and tend to move to Oak Forest and Westbury instead of Glenbrook Valley, so Searcy called Glenbrook Valley a "diamond in the rough".

Steve Jansen of Houston Press said in 2011 that most Houstonians are not familiar with Glenbrook Valley. He added that Glenbrook Valley is "smack-dab in the middle of urban blight."

John Nova Lomax of the Houston Press said in a 2008 article that Morley Street "is fairly typical of this part of Garden Villas – a mix of Sharpstownesque ranch houses and corrugated tin light industrial workshops." The section is in the Glenbrook Valley area.

== Demographics ==
As of 2011 many residents of Glenbrook Valley are African Americans, Hispanic Americans, and Vietnamese Americans. Many members of the latter two groups, as of 2011, have limited English fluency.

City of Houston demographic data recent as of June 2011 stated that the median household income of Glenbrook Valley was $37,860.

During the "Space Age" many Italian Americans moved to Glenbrook Valley.

== Government and infrastructure ==
Glenbrook Valley is in Houston City Council District I.

Houston Fire Department Fire Stations 36 (Hobby Airport) and 29 (Old Galveston Road) are in the area.

The Harris Health System (formerly Harris County Hospital District) designated the Martin Luther King Health Center in southeast Houston for the ZIP code 77061. The designated public hospital is Ben Taub General Hospital in the Texas Medical Center.

== Education ==
=== Primary and secondary schools ===
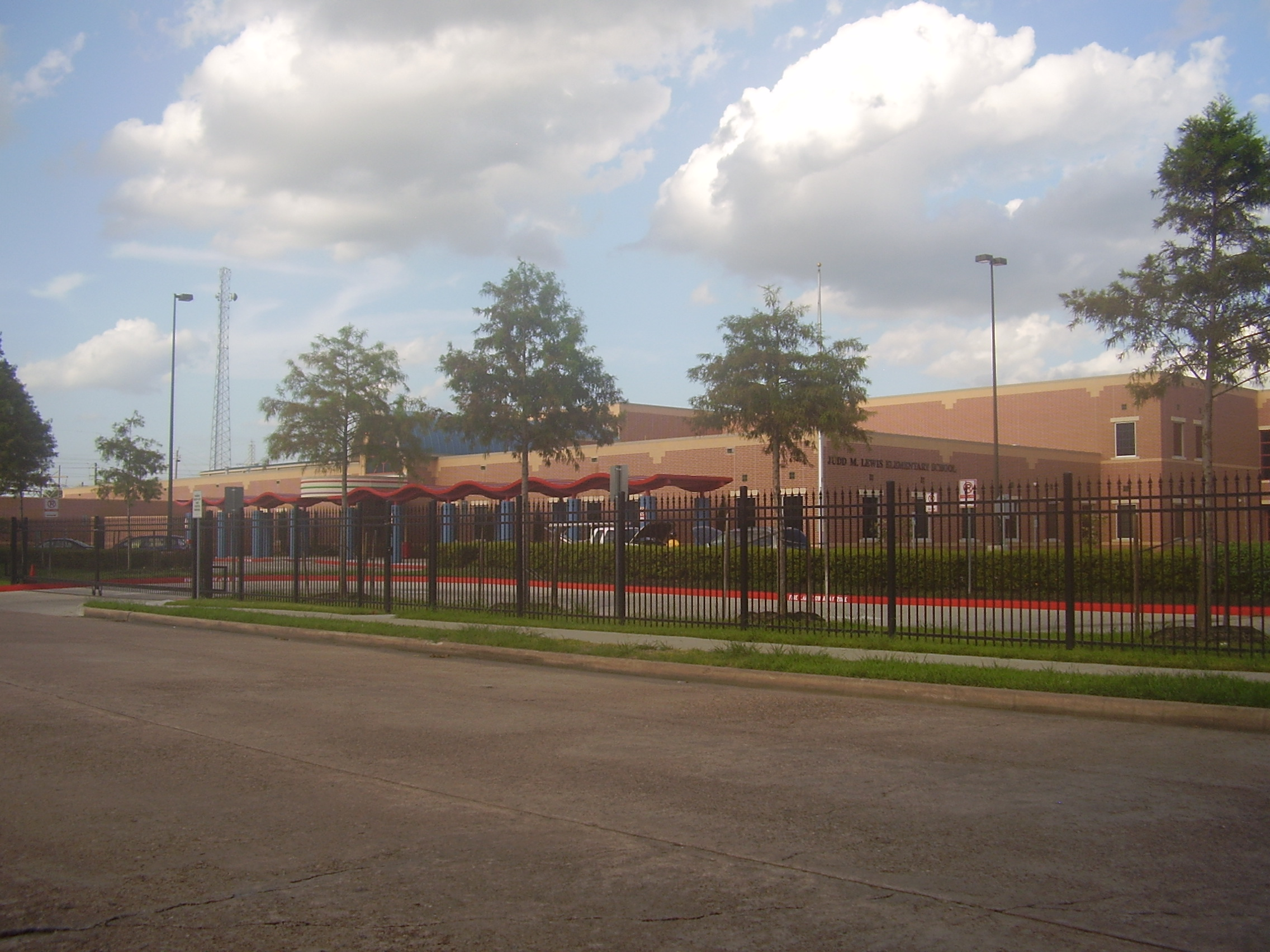
Lewis Elementary School

Glenbrook Valley is zoned to schools in the Houston Independent School District.

Bellfort Early Childhood Center serves the community. Most residents are zoned to Lewis Elementary School. Some residents are zoned to Cornelius Elementary School, and some residents are zoned to Park Place Elementary School. All residents are zoned to Ortiz Middle School and Chávez High School.

Prior to the opening of Ortiz, which was built in 2002, Glenbrook Valley was zoned to Stevenson Middle School. Stevenson opened in January 1994. Prior to the opening of Chávez, Glenbrook Valley was zoned to Milby High School. Chávez opened in 2000.

Bellfort Academy, purchased by HISD in 1996, was originally a medical building. As an HISD facility it began as an alternative school. In 1998 it was configured into a zoned 4-5 school, to take grades 4-5 from Lewis elementary school. The school district announced that Bellfort would be consolidated into Lewis Elementary so that all grades attend the same campus; the consolidated school was expected to open in Spring 2011. Bellfort became a PreK-K center.

=== Public libraries ===
The Houston Public Library operates the Park Place Regional Library near Glenbrook Valley.

== Parks and recreation ==
Dow Park is located in Glenbrook Valley. It includes a trail system, a 240-foot (73 m) multipurpose baseball field, three full court tennis courts, and a playground.
