= Park Place, Houston =

Subdivision in Houston, Texas, U.S.

Coordinates: 29.692°N 95.277°W

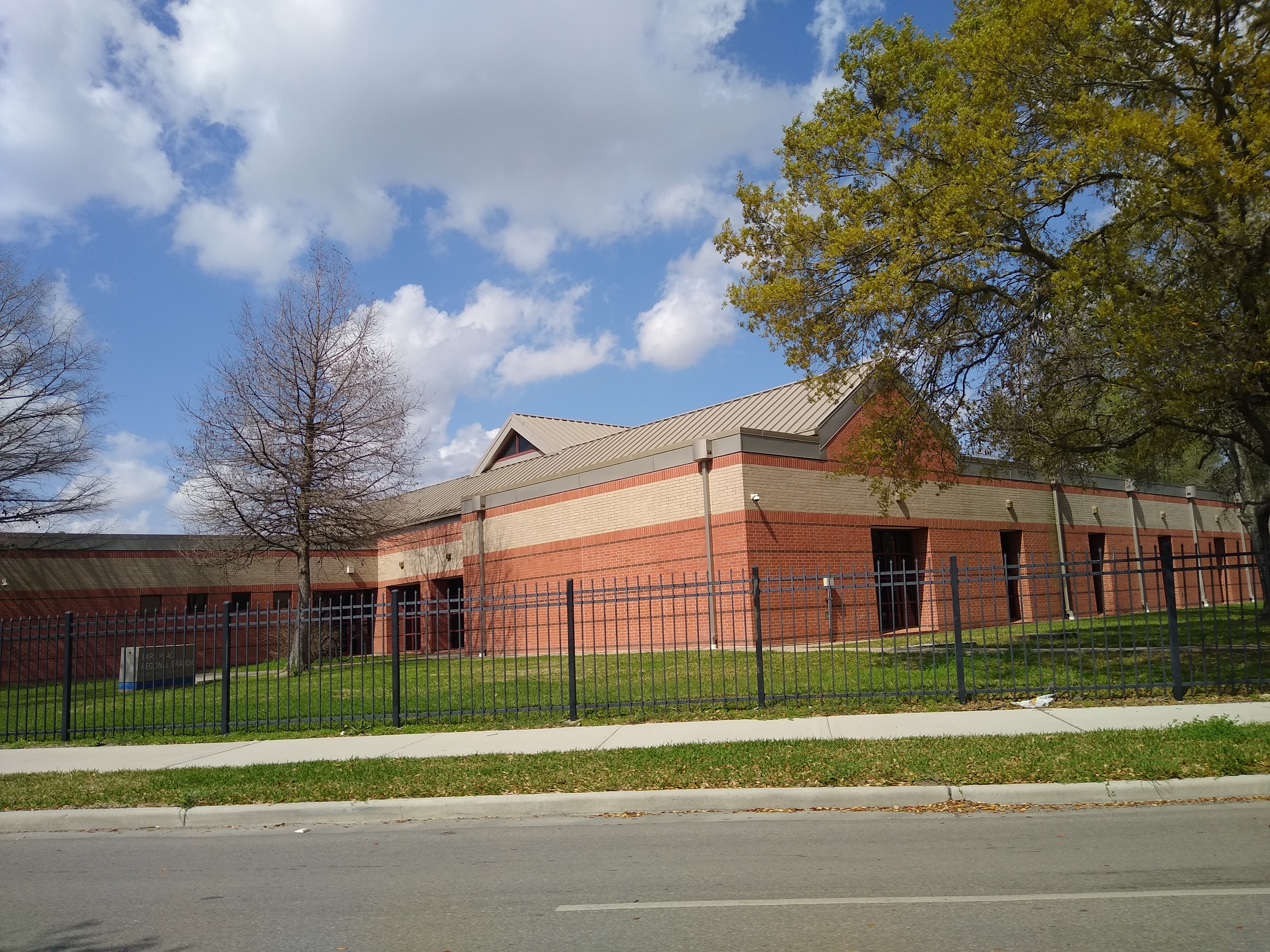
Park Place Regional Library

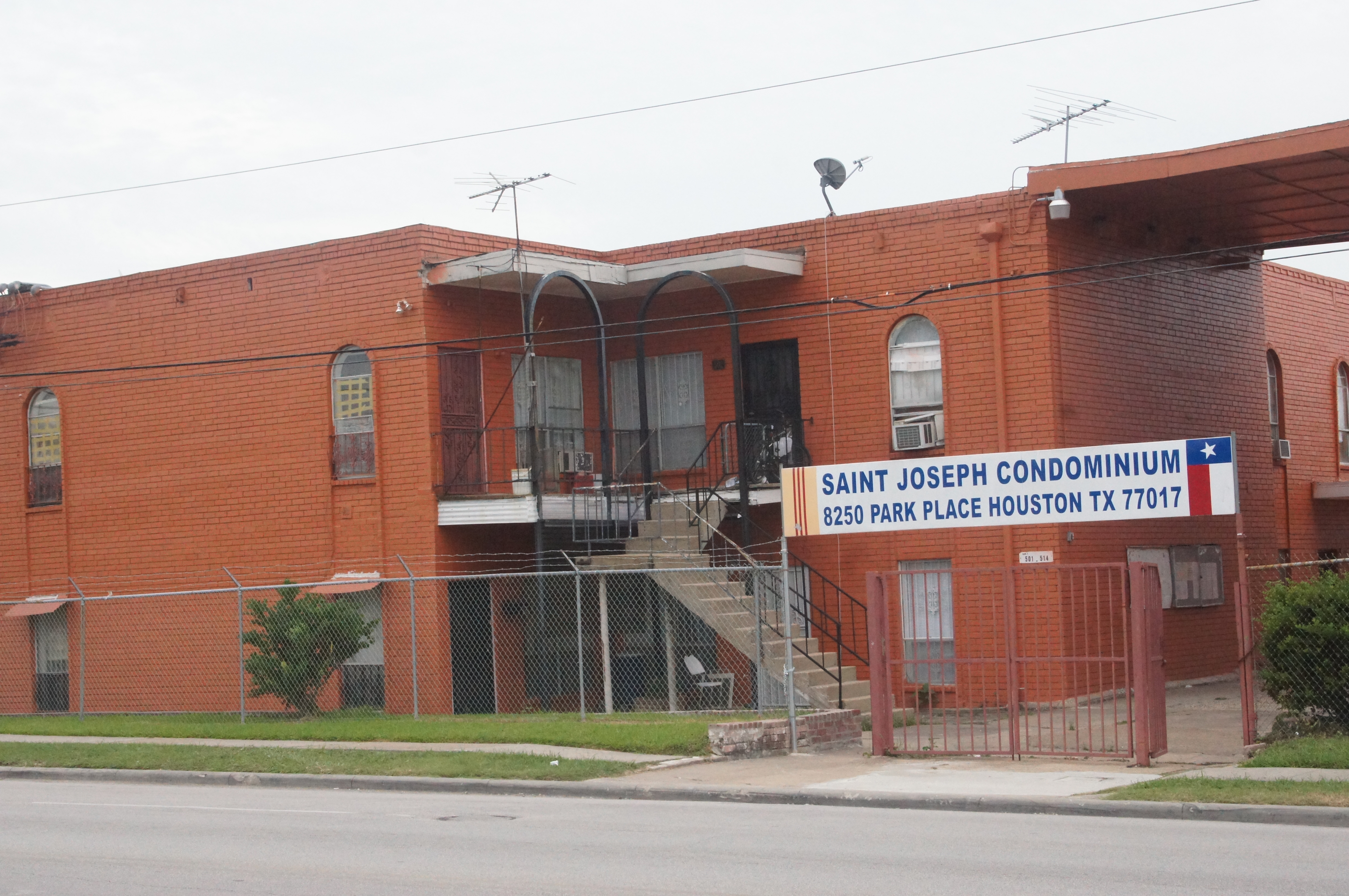
Saint Joseph Condominium

Park Place is a subdivision located in Houston, Texas, United States.

Park Place is located outside of the 610 Loop and inside Beltway 8 in southeast Houston, near William P. Hobby Airport.

Journalist John Nova Lomax described Park Place in a 2008 Houston Press article as "old, but not as tired as it looked a few years ago" as Park Place had new retail strip malls and renovated houses.

== Demographics ==
As of the 2000 U.S. census about 67% of the residents of the Park Place Super Neighborhood have an income below $35,000. The citywide rate for Houston is 57%. Therefore the real income for Park Place residents is below the average for the City of Houston.

== Cityscape ==
St. Joseph Village, a condominium complex with an ethnic Vietnamese population, is in Park Place. A St. Luke's Episcopal Health Charities report said that residents have a lack of security, a paucity of maintenance services, a poor sewer system, and other problems.

== Government and infrastructure ==
Park Place is served by the Houston Police Department's Eastside Patrol Division, with headquarters at 7525 Sherman Street. The Leija Community Storefront is located at 4701 Galveston Road.

Park Place is within City Council District I. As of 2008 James G. Rodriguez represents the district.

The United States Postal Service operates the Vanessa Guillén (formerly Park Place) Post Office at 5302 Galveston Road. In July 2011 the USPS announced that the post office may close. The post office remained open, and, in 2023, was renamed after soldier Vanessa Guillén.

The Harris Health System (formerly Harris County Hospital District) designated the Strawberry Health Center in Pasadena for the ZIP code 77017. The designated public hospital is Ben Taub General Hospital in the Texas Medical Center.

== Education ==
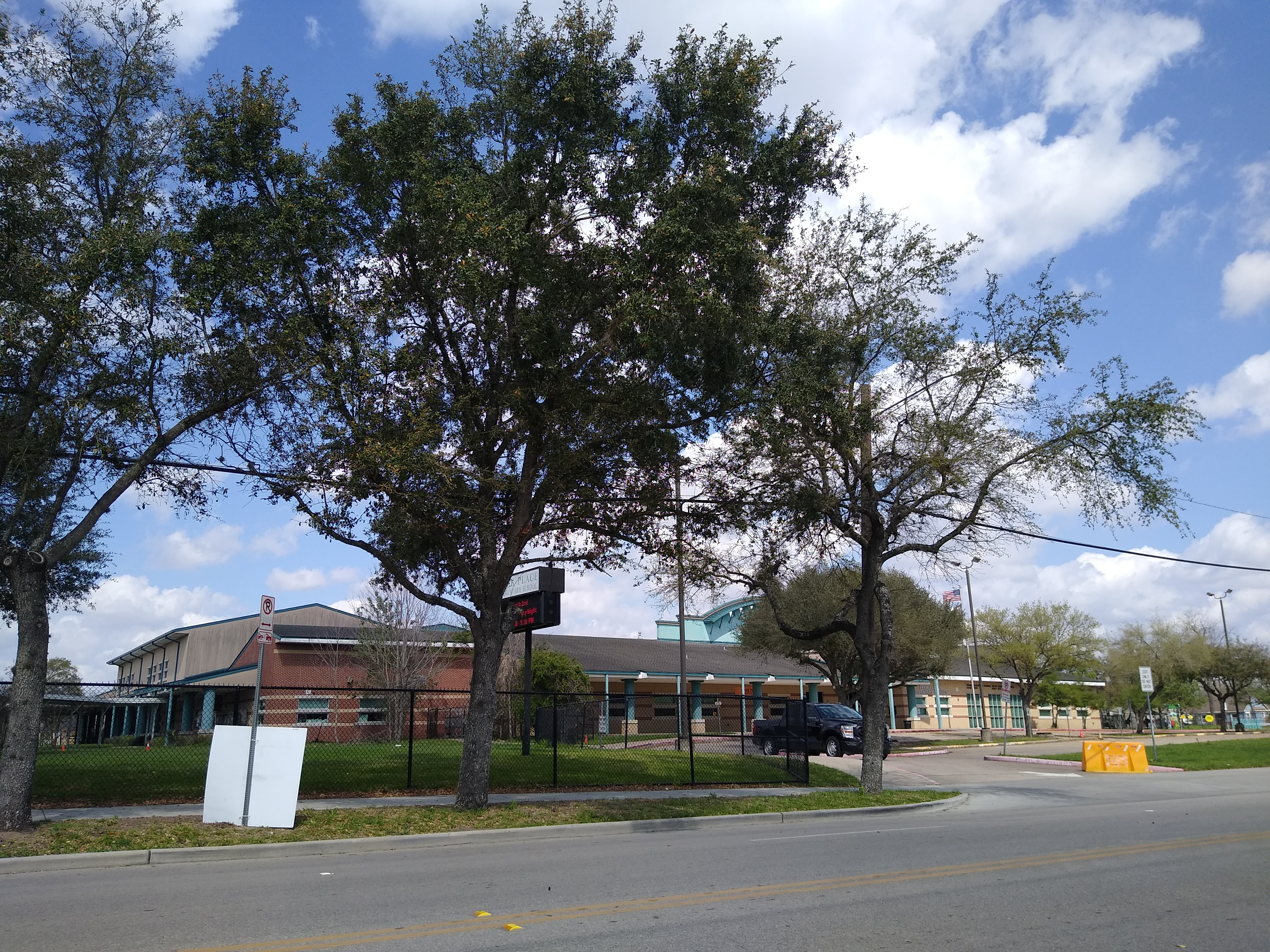
Park Place Elementary School

Houston Independent School District (HISD) operates local public schools. Park Place is within Trustee District III, represented by Manuel Rodríguez, Jr. as of 2008.

Residents are zoned to Park Place Elementary School, Ortiz Middle School, and Chávez High School. Park Place opened in 1915, as a part of the City of Park Place. The land was donated by the Park Place Development Company. The city government renovated the school in 1925, and HISD annexed the school in 1927. Chávez opened in August 2000. Ortiz opened in 2002. During the same year Park Place moved to a new facility north of the former campus, while keeping the same address. The new Park Place building opened in the fall of that year. Park Place Elementary has signage in English, Spanish, and Vietnamese. As of 2006, 20% of the students attending the school were ethnic Vietnamese.

Prior to the opening of Ortiz, Park Place was zoned to Stevenson Middle School. Stevenson opened in January 1994.

Prior to the opening of Chávez, Park Place was zoned to Milby High School.

Park Place includes St. Christopher Church, and the church, of the Roman Catholic Archdiocese of Galveston-Houston, includes St. Christopher Catholic School. The school opened in August 1924.

== Culture ==
There is a mural dedicated to Vanessa Guillén at Taqueria del Sol in Park Place neighborhood.
