= Xuân Định =

Coordinates: 10.8872°N 107.26°E

- Ward
- Location in Vietnam
- Country: Vietnam
- Municipality: Đồng Nai

Area
  - Total: 504 sq mi (1,305 km^{2})

Population (1999)
  - Total: 7.749
- Time zone: UTC+7 (UTC+7)

Xuân Định is a commune (xã) in Đồng Nai, Vietnam.

== Hamlets ==
Thái Xuân is a hamlet within Xuân Định, in proximity to Saigon. It was founded in 1954 by Father John Chinh Tran, a Catholic priest, in what was South Vietnam at the time. Chinh founded it with peasants who had fled North Vietnam. The group, who were Catholic, were from Thái Bình Province. Due to the Xuân Lộc location and the Thái Bình origin, the hamlet was named "Thái Xuân".

After the Vietnam War lead to the disestablishment of South Vietnam, many Catholic refugees arrived in the United States. In Houston, Chinh founded Thai Xuan Village as a new community, and named it after the old village. As of 2005, 99% of the residents of Thai Xuan have remained as Roman Catholics.

== Hamlets ==
Bảo Thị is a hamlet within Xuân Định.
