= Texas Environmental Justice Advocacy Services =

U.S. non-profit organization

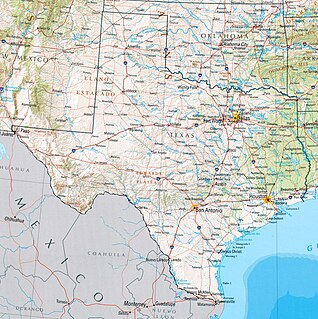
Texas Map

Texas Environmental Justice Advocacy Services (TEJAS) is a non-profit organization based in eastern Houston. It was established in 1995, and is dedicated to protecting the environment through policy, community awareness, legal proceedings, and education. Their past efforts have included expanding language accessibility with the Texas Commission on Environmental Quality (TCEQ) and making efforts against the Keystone XL pipeline.

== History ==
The Texas Environmental Justice Advocacy Services (TEJAS) was established in 1995 by Juan Parras, Bryan Parras and Ana Parras under its original name, Unidos Contra Environmental Racism. One of their initial campaigns aimed to halt the construction of Cesar Chavez High School.

Juan Parras serves as the founder and executive director of TEJAS, while Ana Parras, contributes as the co-director.

== Major programs and initiatives ==
TEJAS has worked with Furr High School, which has been named the "First Environmental Justice School in the Nation" by emphasizing citizen science and environmental justice work in Houston.

== Partnerships and collaborations ==
Below is a list of some of TEJAS's partnerships:

- Texas A&M: With the Institute for Sustainable Communities, TEJAS works with Texas A&M to create research questions about the impact of industrial emissions and other operations on air quality. TEJAS organizes the data collection and works with the institute.
- Union of Concerned Scientists: TEJAS has worked with the Union of Concerned Scientists to address the issues of chemicals and air pollution, specifically in the Houston area. Their work is primarily directed to affected people of color and individuals who reside in low income neighborhoods.

== Leadership ==
Juan Parras is the co-founder and director of TEJAS. He has worked to assist marginalized communities via environmental advocacy. Ana Parras is the co-founder, co-director, and administrator of TEJAS. She and Juan Parras co-founded Unidos Contra Environmental Racism, which is now known as TEJAS. Nalleli Hidalgo is the educational liaison and community outreach coordinator of TEJAS. She works with youths to educate them about environmental justice and equity, primarily in underrepresented communities such as at Furr High School. She educates them on ways to advocate for environmental justice. TEJAS also has many volunteers and community members who help to advocate for environmental justice and equality in Texas.
