= Milby High School =

Public secondary school in Houston, Texas

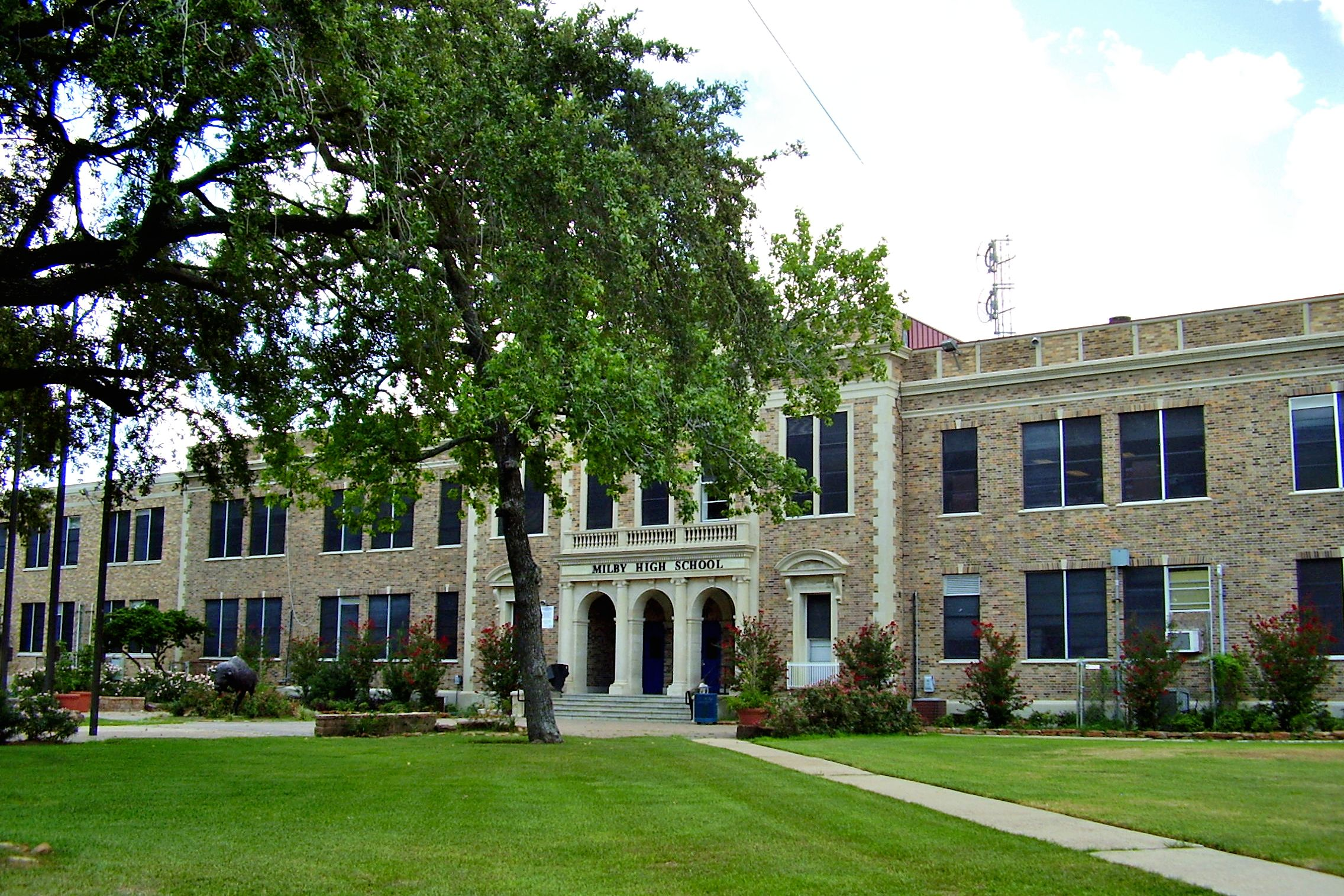

Location
- 1601 Broadway; Houston, (Harris County), Texas 77012; United States

Information
- Type: Public high school
- Principal: Ruth I. Pena
- Staff: 98.45 (FTE)
- Enrollment: 2,107 (2022-23)
- Student to teacher ratio: 21.40
- Colors: Blue and gold
- Mascot: Bison
- Nickname: Buffs
- Website: milby.houstonisd.org

Charles H. Milby High School is a public secondary school at 1601 Broadway in the East End, Houston, Texas, United States. It serves grades 9 through 12, and is a part of the Houston Independent School District.

Milby is located inside the 610 Loop in southeast Houston. The school contains Houston ISD's Science Institute Magnet Program. As of 2018, the school's principal administrator is Ruth Ruiz.

Milby also has HISD's high school program for deaf students.

In 2014, J. Howard Johnston and Ronald Williamson described Milby's neighborhood as "one of the most impoverished parts of Houston".

== History ==
Milby began its life in March 1926, replacing the former Harrisburg High School, which was located several blocks south of Milby. Thirteen teachers and 212 students formed Milby's initial population. The $180,000 campus had, and still has, a Romanesque exterior. Milby has since had various expansions and renovations. Originally a predominately non-Hispanic White school, Milby became mostly Hispanic as the population of the East End area increased.

Prior to 1965, Milby admitted White and Hispanic students, while it did not admit Black students. At the time, Hispanics were considered white. Houston high schools desegregated one grade per year from 1965 - 1967.

Milby High School was used as a filming location for My Best Friend Is a Vampire in 1986; it was renamed "Milton High School" in the movie. Many interior scenes, including scenes of the main character in his bedroom, were filmed inside the school, and the exterior was used in the movie as well. Students at Milby were extras in many scenes, as the filming took place during school hours. After the movie was completed, the sign on the exterior of the school that had been in disrepair was replaced with a new one by the production company.

In September 1991, Milby was one of 32 HISD schools that had capped enrollments; in other words, the school was filled to capacity and excess students had to attend other schools.

On November 14, 1991, 18-year-old Francisco Contreras received four gunshot wounds in his feet and leg outside of the cafeteria at Milby. Police arrested a 16-year-old described by HISD officials as a "disturbed freshman."

In December 1991, Milby was one of the largest high schools in Texas, with 3,617 students. Due to the overcrowding, by that month Houston ISD trustees approved a plan to open a new high school in September 1995 instead of in 1997. Milby, in the meantime, had already had additions, so the district did not need to install very many temporary buildings. By 1997 the new high school had not yet been constructed; area community leaders and parents anticipated the construction of César Chávez High School, as Austin and Milby were still overcrowded. Prior to 1997, residents zoned to Furr also had the option to attend Austin and Milby high schools; in 1997 the school district canceled the option.

In the fall of 2000, Chávez opened and took most of Milby's traditional neighborhoods. In turn Milby absorbed some students from Austin. Areas that were zoned to Milby in 1998 were rezoned to Chávez. In turn Milby absorbed attendance areas from Austin and Furr high schools.

In 2007, Johns Hopkins University referred to Milby as a "dropout factory," where at least 40 percent of the entering freshman class does not make it to their senior year. During that year, 20 percent of high schoolers zoned to Milby chose to attend a different Houston ISD school.

A petroleum academy opened in Milby in the fall of 2008. Halliburton donated $27 million to provide engineering and geoscience software while Shell Oil Company donated laptops altogether worth $115,000. The first petroleum academy class graduated in 2011.

Around 2014, the school began digitizing its old yearbooks.

As of August 2014, the Milby campus closed for reconstruction. The school administration and the 9th grade students were temporarily housed in trailers at Attucks Middle School in Sunnyside, while students in grades 10-12 were housed at Jones Futures Academy in South Park.

On December 18, 2014, groundbreaking for a new campus occurred. The project comes from the 2012 bond. The original 1926 building, made of concrete and brick, will remain, while other portions have been demolished and replaced with new construction.

== Student population ==
In 1948, Milby had 1,230 students.

In 1960, Milby High School was majority Anglo White with students of Mexican origin making up less than 9% of the student body.

The total student population for the 2014–2015 school year was 1,591.

As of 2014, many students are children of first-generation immigrants.

== Campus ==
By 1998 the campus had had a total of seven additions, reflecting the growth of the student population in the East End. The school had established a new track and football field, and acquired neighboring property to make room for new additions. In 2012, Richard Connelly of the Houston Press ranked Milby as the fourth most architecturally beautiful high school campus in Greater Houston. The school library at the time was previously an auditorium. As of 1998 it had 30,000 titles available. A computer laboratory and reading room were, as of 1998, located in the former second floor gymnasium. By 1998 the school locker rooms had been upgraded.

== Academics and academic performance ==
As of 2012, Milby offers technical English courses meant to improve comprehension of non-fiction texts. These courses are offered in addition to standard literature classes.

Students from Milby and Austin High School who are taking computer-related courses that qualify them for an A+ certification in computer troubleshooting or an N+ certification in networking go to the Rudy C. Vara Center for Technology every other day.

Of the non-Petroleum Academy Milby students graduating in 2011, 46% entered community colleges and 37% entered four-year universities and colleges. Of the 80 students who started in the first Petroleum Academy class, 62 moved on to four-year colleges and universities, and most of the remainder went on to community colleges.

== School uniform ==
In 1999, Milby High School instituted a school uniform policy. The Texas Education Agency specified that parents and/or guardians of students zoned to a school with uniforms could apply for a waiver to opt out of the policy so their children did not have to wear the uniform; parents were required to specify "bona fide" reasons, such as religious reasons or philosophical objections.

As of the 2017–2018 school year, students no longer wear uniforms, but there are strict guidelines and rules as to what they can wear with their "free-dress", such as the exclusion of spaghetti strap shirts and basketball shorts. No form of gang-related symbols may be present on clothing.

== Extracurricular activities ==
By 1998 extracurricular clubs in general had declined since many students were too busy to participate; by then many of them had after-school jobs.

The school once had a Future Farmers of America club but by 1989 it was disbanded.

=== Athletics ===
Historically, the player on the football team considered to be the most valuable would receive the Looney Trophy. Mike Vance, author of Houston's Sporting Life: 1900-1950, described Milam "Mike" Jones, the first football player from Milby to appear in the Texas North-South All-Star Game, as "an early star of Milby football". Jones won the Looney Trophy and, as a 12th-grade student, appeared in the 1941 North-South All-Star Game.

In a period beginning around 1972, and as of 1997 the Milby basketball team was mostly made up of African-Americans.

By 1998 the school had gained a pep squad with both boys and girls. The previous Girls' Booster Club declined due to a decreasing number of students, and ended in 1994.

In 1926 the group Coed Cadettes was established. Berryhill wrote that it was the "mainstay" of Milby when the school first opened. It was a marching group and included only female students. By 1998 the Coed Cadettes had a small number of students. The number of participants of the group, later named the Milby Cadettes, lowered still and the group stopped operations in 2010. It was re-established in 2021. In 2023 22 students are in the group.

== Neighborhoods served by Milby ==
Several neighborhoods inside and outside the 610 Loop, including Harrisburg, Pecan Park, Park Place, Mason Park, Manchester, Pineview Place, and most of Magnolia Park are located in Milby's attendance zone.

Prior to the opening of Chávez, Milby served the communities of Park Place and Glenbrook Valley.

== Feeder patterns ==
The following elementary schools feed into Milby: All of the attendance zone:

- Crespo
- J.R. Harris

Some of the attendance zone:

- Briscoe
- Dávila
- De Zavala
- Gallegos
- Sanchez
- Southmayd

Portions of the attendance zones of Deady, Edison, and Stevenson Middle Schools feed into Milby.

== Notable alumni ==
- South Park Mexican more known as SPM a famous rapper who attended Milby Highschool but was expelled in 1987 in his freshman year.
- Carol Alvarado (Class of 1986) – State Representative, District 145 (Texas)
- Donald Driver (Class of 1993) – NFL player for the Green Bay Packers
- Alton Ford (Class of 2000) – former NBA player for the Phoenix Suns and Houston Rockets.
- Mario V. Gallegos Jr. (Class of 1968) – Texas State Senator; retired captain of the Houston Fire Department
- Robert "Bob" Alton Gammage (Class of 1956) – Texas State Supreme Court Justice and U.S. Representative
- Gorgeous George, real name George Wagner – early television wrestler; dropped out of high school
- Frank O. Mancuso (Class of 1936) – retired City Councilman (served 1963–1993); former Major League catcher; member of the World Series-bound 1944 St. Louis Browns; played for the Washington Senators and Houston Buffaloes; namesake of a Houston Public Library branch and a Harris County baseball complex
- K.T. Oslin (Class of 1960) – country-western singer
- Gordon Quan (Class of 1966) – Houston Council member-at-Large; former Houston Mayor pro tempore
- Charles Swindoll (Class of 1953) – Christian pastor
- Andrea Yates (Class of 1982) – killer of her five children due to post-partum psychosis
- Rob Williams (Class of 1979) – member of the Houston Cougars' Phi Slama Jama basketball team from 1979–82; drafted 1st. rd. 19th overall by the Denver Nuggets in the 1982 NBA draft
