= Harding Street raid =

2019 botched police raid in Texas, U.S.

- Location: 29.709493°N 95.281815°W; 7815 Harding Street; Pecan Park, Houston, Texas, U.S.
- Date: January 28, 2019
- Attack type: Mass shooting; shootout; police brutality
- Deaths: 2
- Injuries: 5 (4 by gunfire)

On January 28, 2019, in the Pecan Park area in the East End district of Houston, Texas, United States, Houston Police Department (HPD) officers initiated a no-knock raid on a house, killing the two homeowners, a husband and wife: Dennis Wayne Tuttle and Rhogena Ann Nicholas. They were aged 59 and 58, respectively. Five HPD officers sustained injuries.

St. John Barned-Smith and Keri Blakinger of the Houston Chronicle described the event as "one of the worst [scandals] to hit HPD in years".

== Background ==
Dennis Wayne Tuttle (March 26, 1959 – January 28, 2019) was raised in the Denver Harbor neighborhood of Houston and had once served in the U.S. Navy. Tuttle's brother Cliff stated that Tuttle liked the water and chose the Navy for that reason. However, he sustained injuries from an accident during his service which caused him to develop seizures, and he was honorably discharged as a result. He fathered two children with his wife, and suffered from a car crash and additional accidents. He was not working at the time of his death due to his health issues. Tuttle's sister, Elizabeth, stated that the man "had debilitating injuries for many years and it's a sad situation." He married Nicholas circa 1999, after having a ceremony at a courthouse. The two had ended their previous relationships prior to becoming romantically involved. Tuttle owned the house located at 7815 Harding Street.

Rhogena Ann Nicholas (March 1, 1960 – January 28, 2019) was born in Ackerman, Mississippi to a dentist and a housewife. She was of partial Lebanese descent through her father. From approximately 1962 onward, she grew up in Macon, Mississippi, attending Central Academy in Macon and Bauder College in Atlanta, before moving to her parents' new residence in Florida. She moved to Houston in the 1980s with her then-boyfriend. At the time of her death, she was taking care of Tuttle and also made some income helping care for her ex-partner who lived nearby. At the time, some members of her family also lived in the Houston area.

Gerald Goines, the officer responsible for writing the search warrant, began working for HPD circa 1985. He had worked in narcotics for many years and had been shot twice before. The first incident occurred in 1992 after a controlled drug buy. The second occurred on a freeway where Goines and another motorist allegedly were competing for space. The other driver reportedly drew a gun and shot Goines in the arm but was killed when Goines returned fire.

== Incident ==
The raid was precipitated by calls from next-door neighbor Patricia Ann Garcia after multiple bitter disagreements. She made a "swatting" call to police on January 8, 2019, reporting that her 25 year-old daughter was doing heroin at the couple's house. She also reported seeing that they had machine guns in the home. In reality, there were no machine guns or heroin found and Garcia did not even have a daughter.

Based on this false information, Goines, an officer with the Houston Police Department, obtained a no-knock search warrant for the residence. To bolster the case, he lied, saying a confidential informant had obtained black tar heroin in a hand-to-hand buy at their house. However, the named informant denied having made such a buy as did all other informants Goines had worked with.

Three weeks after Garcia's initial calls, police officers raided the home of Tuttle and Nicholas on January 28, 2019. After the officers entered the home, they shot a dog owned by the couple. According to the HPD report, Tuttle was armed with a revolver and engaged the officers before being killed by return fire. Nicholas was unarmed but was shot by a backup officer when she allegedly reached for a wounded officer's shotgun. There is no video footage of the raid. Four of the police suffered gunshot wounds, though there was some doubt early on that they were all from Tuttle's revolver.

== Casualties ==
The autopsies of Tuttle and Nicholas were conducted by the Harris County Institute of Forensic Sciences in Houston on January 29 and 30.

Tuttle sustained up to nine bullet wounds to his head and neck, chest, left shoulder, left forearm and hand, left thigh and buttock, and right wrist. Other injuries included "minor blunt force" trauma to his left ear, extremity wounds, bullet grazing on the right forearm, neck lacerations possibly caused by a necklace, and upper left-side abdomen abrasions. Possible gunpowder residue was noted next to his left index finger. Toxicology testing found THC in his system.

Nicholas sustained two bullet wounds, with other injuries tentatively attributed to bullet fragments. She had been hit in the thigh and chest, and fragments may have hit her right leg and thigh. Toxicology reports later found benzoylecgonine, a byproduct associated with metabolism of cocaine, but no traces of cocaine in her system.

The injured police officers were treated at Memorial Hermann–Texas Medical Center. Four of them had received gunshot injuries and another had a knee injury. One of the officers was permanently paralyzed as a result of his injuries. Goines, one of the officers shot, later stated through his lawyer that he was retiring.

== Investigations ==
Police reportedly found 18 grams of marijuana and 1.5 grams of cocaine in the house, which were user amounts but not distributor levels; the small amount and type of drugs were consistent with the toxicology findings. KHOU-TV received the reports on May 2. On May 15, 2019, HPD chief Art Acevedo announced that the investigation had concluded, with the information given to prosecutors.

The Tuttle and Nicholas families hired a forensic team headed by Mick Maloney formerly of Naval Criminal Investigative Service (NCIS). The team processed the crime scene on May 10, 2019, three months after the raid. They were surprised and troubled to find significant evidence left behind or uncollected by the earlier Houston Forensic Science Center police investigation. They mapped out the trajectories from the bullet holes in the walls with the goal to reconstruct the shooting by matching bloodstains and bullet trajectories in the house to the wounds of the victims. The team spent four days reviewing the evidence. Attorney Chuck Bourque told the Houston Chronicle they found no evidence anyone in the house fired toward the door nor that Tuttle's two rifles and two shotguns had even been fired. This did not account for the .357 revolver and shell casings reportedly collected by police; a revolver was not listed in the inventory of confiscated items after the raid. The team did find evidence that suggests police outside the house fired blindly through the walls. Evidence also suggested that some of the officers' injuries were from friendly fire.

== Legal action ==
On July 24, 2019, the federal grand jury investigating the raid heard testimony from Houston police officers. On August 23, 2019, Harris County District Attorney Kim Ogg announced that officer Gerald Goines had been charged with two counts of felony murder. Officer Steven Bryant had also been charged with evidence tampering for "knowingly providing false information" in a police report. In November 2019, the FBI arrested Goines and others as part of the organization's investigation.

On November 20, 2019, a federal grand jury returned indictments on federal charges in the Pecan Park raid case. Goines was charged with making false statements and depriving the victims of their constitutional right to be secure against unreasonable searches. Steven M. Bryant, another ex-HPD officer, was charged with making false statements and obstructing an official proceeding with further false statements. Patricia Ann Garcia was charged with making several fake 911 calls including the false claims that her daughter was in the Tuttle residence doing drugs and that the Tuttles were drug addicts who possessed machine guns. Authorities took the three into custody. Goines was charged with seven counts total; he surrendered to the FBI at his residence.

In January 2020, a Harris County grand jury indicted Goines and Steven Bryant under Texas law, charging both with tampering with government documents and Goines with felony murder. Bryant later pleaded guilty to his charges.

The relatives of the deceased filed the first document in a lawsuit against the municipal government in July 2019.

In July 2020, an additional 17 criminal counts were filed against six of the officers. As of June 2021, a total of 11 current or former HPD officers had been indicted.

In March 2021, Patricia Ann Garcia pleaded guilty to making the false call leading to the raid and, in June, was sentenced by Judge George C. Hanks Jr. to 40 months of federal prison.

Goines was convicted of murder in September 2024. During his sentencing on October 3, 2024, he suffered a medical emergency and was removed from the courtroom. Goines later recovered and was sentenced to 60 years' imprisonment.

== Reaction ==
Radley Balko of The Washington Post wrote a criticism of no-knock raids based on this incident. The Houston Chronicle editorial board criticized HPD, stating that it lost the trust of Houstonians.

In light of the shooting, Texas House of Representatives member Gene Wu and Texas Senate member Borris Miles proposed a bill that would make no-knock warrants unlawful in Texas.

The group We the People Organize, formed after the incident, created a mural in honor of the victims, which was unveiled in 2022.

As a result of the raid, HPD began requiring approval from the department head or a designee of that head before any no-knock raid.

== Families of Tuttle and Nicholas sue ==
The families of those killed in the Harding Street raid filed lawsuits against the city in January 2021. They allege that the officers involved had violated the civil rights of Tuttle and Nicholas.

On January 16, 2024, while announcing his resignation from the Aurora Colorado police department, Art Acevedo said he'd recently been served with a subpoena to testify in a federal lawsuit the victims' families filed against the City of Houston.

A week later the Houston City Council approved $1.7 million to defend itself and former Police Chief Art Acevedo against the lawsuit. This was in addition to $1.25 million paid to law firm Beck Redden, to file a motion for summary judgment to dismiss the lawsuit.

== Reexamination of Goines' cases ==
Due to the false statements made by Goines and Bryant concerning the raid, Houston police began a systematic review of some combined 14,000 cases which had been handled by the officers in Goines's squad. In February 2020, the Houston District Attorney's office had identified 69 cases in which information provided by Goines had led to a wrongful conviction. By the end of 2021, more than 160 pending cases had been dismissed.

George Floyd, who grew up and spent most of his life in Houston, had been convicted of a drug charge in 2004. Goines had participated in this case, which was among those reviewed. Based on a parole board's findings, Floyd was one of two dozen people scheduled to be pardoned in December 2021 by Governor Greg Abbott before the parole board abruptly withdrew their recommendation due to "unexplained departures" in its process.

In July 2022, Houston resident Frederick Jeffery was released on bond after findings that Goines had falsified evidence and perjured himself. His conviction was overturned by the appeals court in November 2022. Another Houston resident, Monique Davis, had her conviction for possession of cocaine overturned on February 5, 2025 after Goines and Bryant were found to have fabricated evidence. The National Registry of Exonerations has recorded at least 38 overturned convictions which resulted from misconduct by Goines, the earliest of them in 2007. To date, neither Goines nor anyone else has been prosecuted for these specific cases of false testimony.

In 2024, both Goines and the city of Houston were sued in a federal lawsuit by James Ybarra, whom Goines had arrested on false drug charges in 2014.

== See also ==
- Lists of killings by law enforcement officers in the United States
