= Economy of Houston =

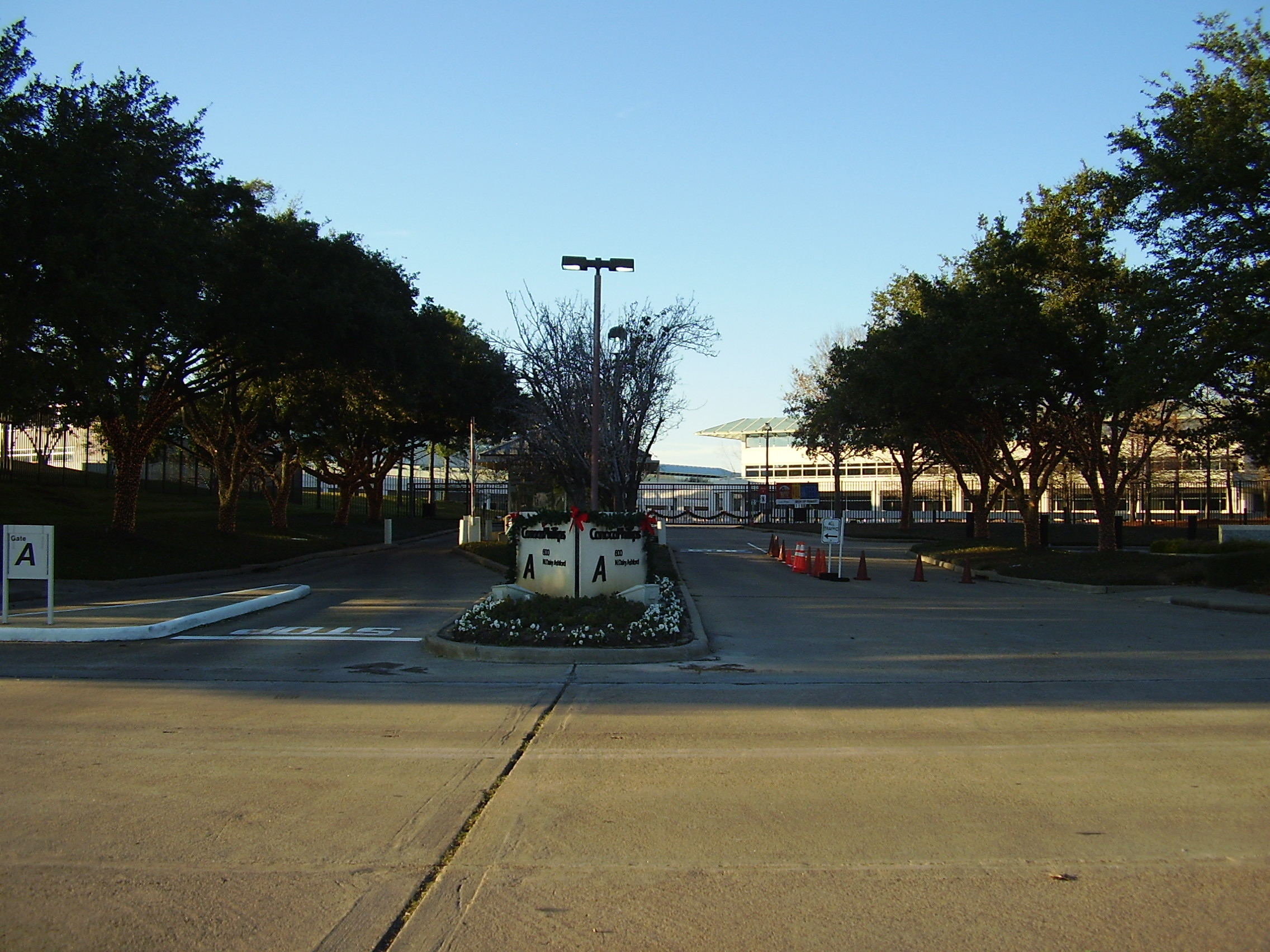
ConocoPhillips headquarters, in the Energy Corridor area of Houston, is the fifth-largest private sector energy corporation in the world.

The economy of Houston is based primarily on the energy industry, particularly oil. However, health care, biomedical research, and aerospace also constitute large sectors. In 2021, the gross domestic product (GDP) of the Houston–Pasadena–The Woodlands metropolitan statistical area (MSA) was $537 billion U.S. dollars, the fourth-largest of any metro area in the United States. The Houston metropolitan area comprises the largest concentration of petrochemical manufacturing in the world, including for synthetic rubber, insecticides, and fertilizers. It is the world's leading center for oilfield equipment construction, with the city of Houston home to more than 3,000 energy-related businesses, including many of the top oil and gas exploration and production firms and petroleum pipeline operators. As of 2011, 23 companies were listed on the Fortune 500 that had headquarters in Houston; In 2026, the figure had grown to 27.

The Houston–Pasadena–The Woodlands ranked 33rd among the nation's 361 MSAs on per capita personal income at US$36,852 - 11.5 percent higher than the national figure of US$33,050. In 2012, Houston was ranked #1 by Forbes for paycheck worth, and, in late May 2013, it was identified as America's top city for job creation.

== Real estate and corporate location ==
Houston is a major corporate center. The city and surrounding metropolitan region is home to 27 Fortune 500 companies, in 2026, as well as other multinationals and domestic companies.

Of the world's 100 largest non-U.S.-based corporations, as of February 2007 more than half had operations in Houston. In 2006, the Houston metropolitan area ranked first in Texas and third in the U.S. within the category of "Best Places for Business and Careers" by Forbes. The 2011 Fortune 500 list shows 23 firms headquartered in the 10-county Houston–Pasadena–The Woodlands Metropolitan Statistical Area. Only New York City has more Fortune 500 headquarters within city limits.

== Finance ==
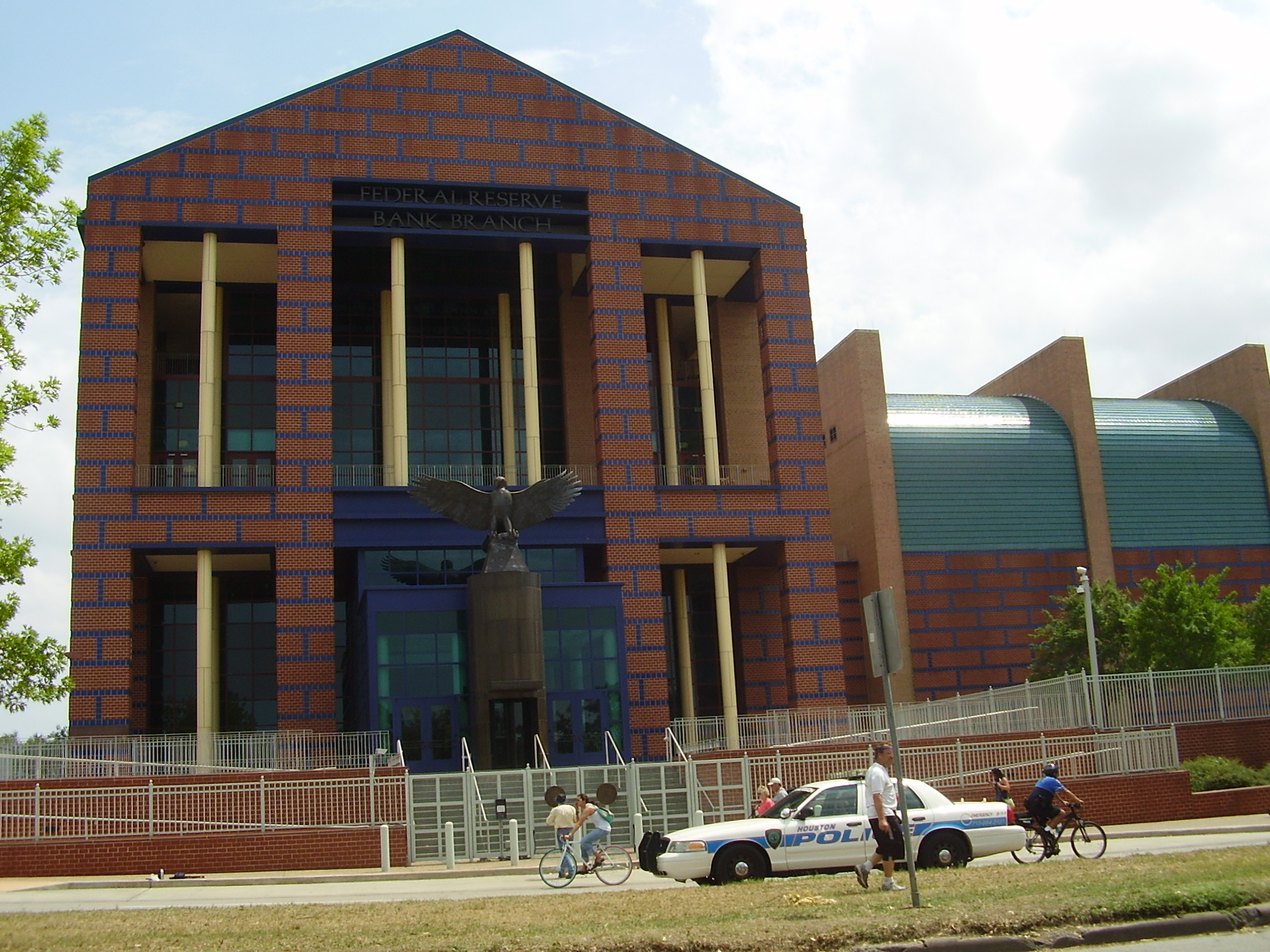
Federal Reserve Bank of Dallas Houston Branch

Banking and financial services are vital to the region. As of December 2006, 40 foreign governments maintained trade and commercial offices here and the city had 23 active foreign chambers of commerce and trade associations. As of 2012, 22 foreign banks representing 12 nations operated in Houston and provided financial assistance to the international community. In 1997, Houston had offices of 84 subsidiaries of Japanese companies. In 2026, the Federal Reserve Bank of Dallas reported a shift to sustainable and Tech finance, along with a lack of available finance professionals in the Houston market, with demand exceeding supply. Three Houston financial companies are listed in the Fortune 1000 in 2026, including one in the Fortune 500.

== Information technology ==
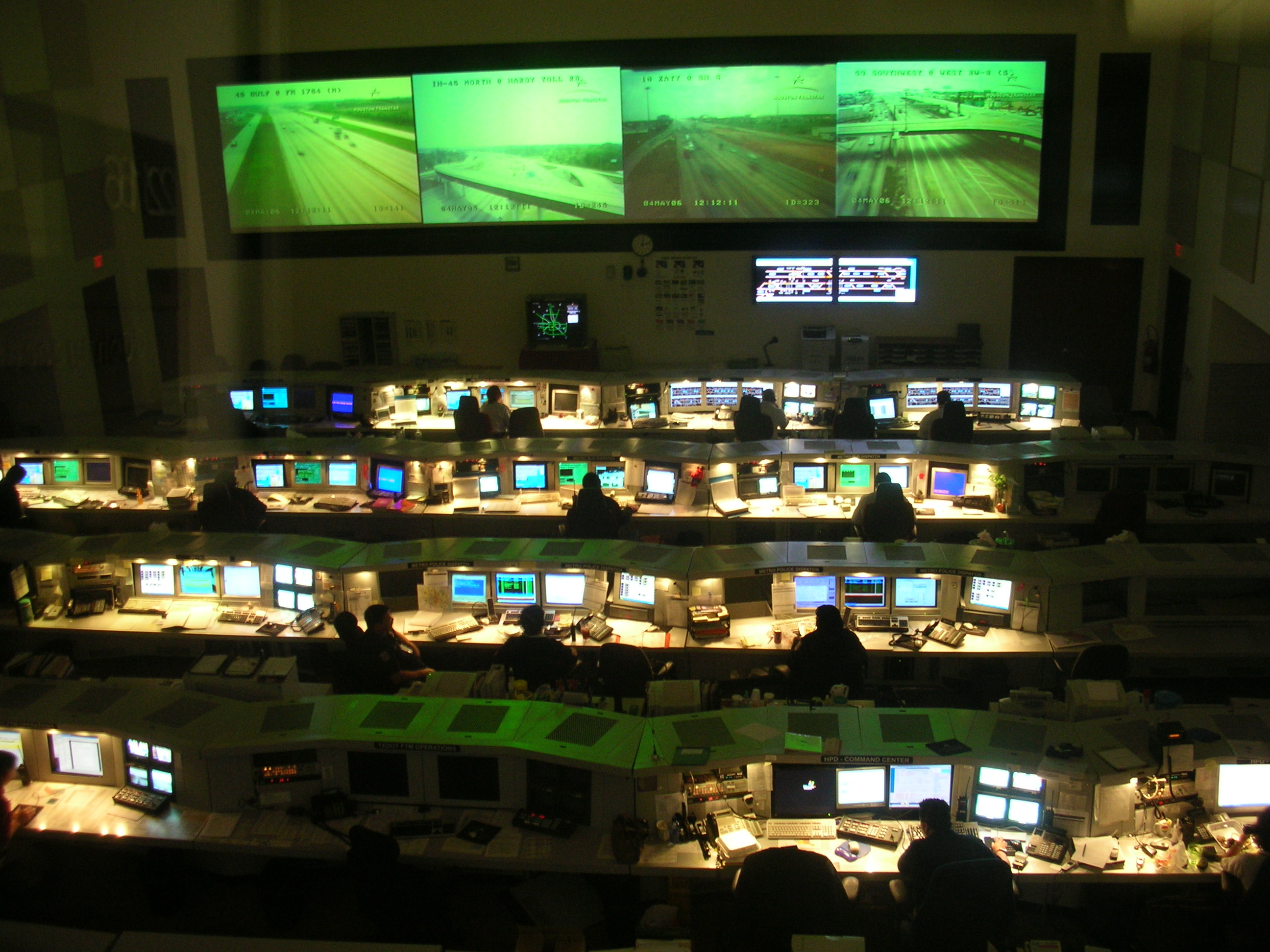
Houston TranStar Center

As of February 2007, Houston had more than 1,900 computer-related companies. Since its inception in 1999, Houston Technology Center has become the center of technology entrepreneurship in Houston. The center has helped more than 150 emerging technology companies raise more than $400 million in capital and create about 1,000 new jobs. Information technology developed in Houston affects many entities, including the region's traffic and emergency response efforts at Houston TranStar, a centralized transportation management and regional emergency management center.

As of 2007, Houston, with a customer base of more than 3 million, was AT&T's largest service city. The city's telecommunications infrastructure completed more than 70 million Houston telephone connections daily. The Texas Public Utilities Commission has certified more than 400 additional local exchange carriers to provide service statewide or specifically within Houston. More than 1,600 interexchange carriers have registered with the commission to provide long-distance service.

== Higher education ==
The University of Houston System's annual impact on the Houston-area's economy equates to that of a major corporation: $1.1 billion in new funds attracted annually to the Houston area, $3.13 billion in total economic benefit, and 24,000 local jobs generated. This is in addition to the 12,500 new graduates the UH System produces every year who enter the workforce in Houston and throughout Texas. These degree-holders tend to stay in Houston. After five years, 80.5 percent of graduates are still living and working in the region.

== Health care and biomedical ==
The Texas Medical Center is the city's healthcare and biotechnology focal point with $3.5 billion committed to research grants from 2000 through 2004, more than 43 member institutions, 5.2 million patient visits in 2004. As of February 2007, more than 65,000 health care professionals worked there every day, treating more than five million patients from all over the world every year. The UT Research Park, a joint venture between The University of Texas M.D. Anderson and the UT Health Science Center at Houston, is located in the Medical Center. When fully developed, the UT Research Park will be made up of nearly 2 million square feet (180,000 m^{2}) of research, lab, office and support space for private companies and not-for-profit research institutions. The venture will be focused on biotechnology and life sciences research. Baylor College of Medicine is home to the Human Genome Sequencing Center, one of only five in the nation.

According to U.S. News & World Report, as of December 2006 many hospitals in Houston consistently rank among the nation's top healthcare institutions.

== Manufacturing and industry ==
Fortune 500 companies based in Houston
| Rank | Company Name |
| 21 | Chevron Corporation |
| 29 | Phillips 66 |
| 55 | Sysco |
| 75 | ConocoPhillips |
| 89 | Enterprise Products Partners |
| 103 | Plains GP Holdings |
| 149 | NRG Energy |
| 157 | Quanta Services |
| 164 | Baker Hughes |
| 173 | Occidental Petroleum |
| 179 | Waste Management |
| 201 | EOG Resources |
| 264 | Group 1 Automotive |
| 207 | Halliburton |
| 223 | Cheniere Energy |
| 236 | Corebridge Financial |
| 262 | Targa Resources |
| 266 | Kinder Morgan |
| 388 | Westlake Chemical |
| 435 | CenterPoint Energy |
| 438 | APA Corporation |
| 440 | Comfort Systems USA |
| 455 | NOV Inc. |
| 488 | KBR |
| 496 | Coterra (acquired by Devon Energy) |
Companies in the petroleum industry

Houston is home to more than 10,700 manufacturing establishments. The city ranked as a Gold Medal World-Class Community for Manufacturing for four consecutive years by Industry Week magazine. The Houston-Gulf Coast region has nearly 40 percent of the U.S. capacity for base petrochemicals, ensuring rapid access to major resin producers and resin technologies. Houston is projected to experience a 2.7 percent increase in manufacturing employment by 2012. Metals manufacturing is a $12.0 billion industry in Houston, with nearly 2,100 establishments employing more than 67,000 workers in the region. Approximately 250 establishments employ more than 20,000 people in Houston's electronics manufacturing industries. As of November 2006, Hewlett-Packard employed more people in its Houston operations than any other HP facility in the world.

=== Energy ===
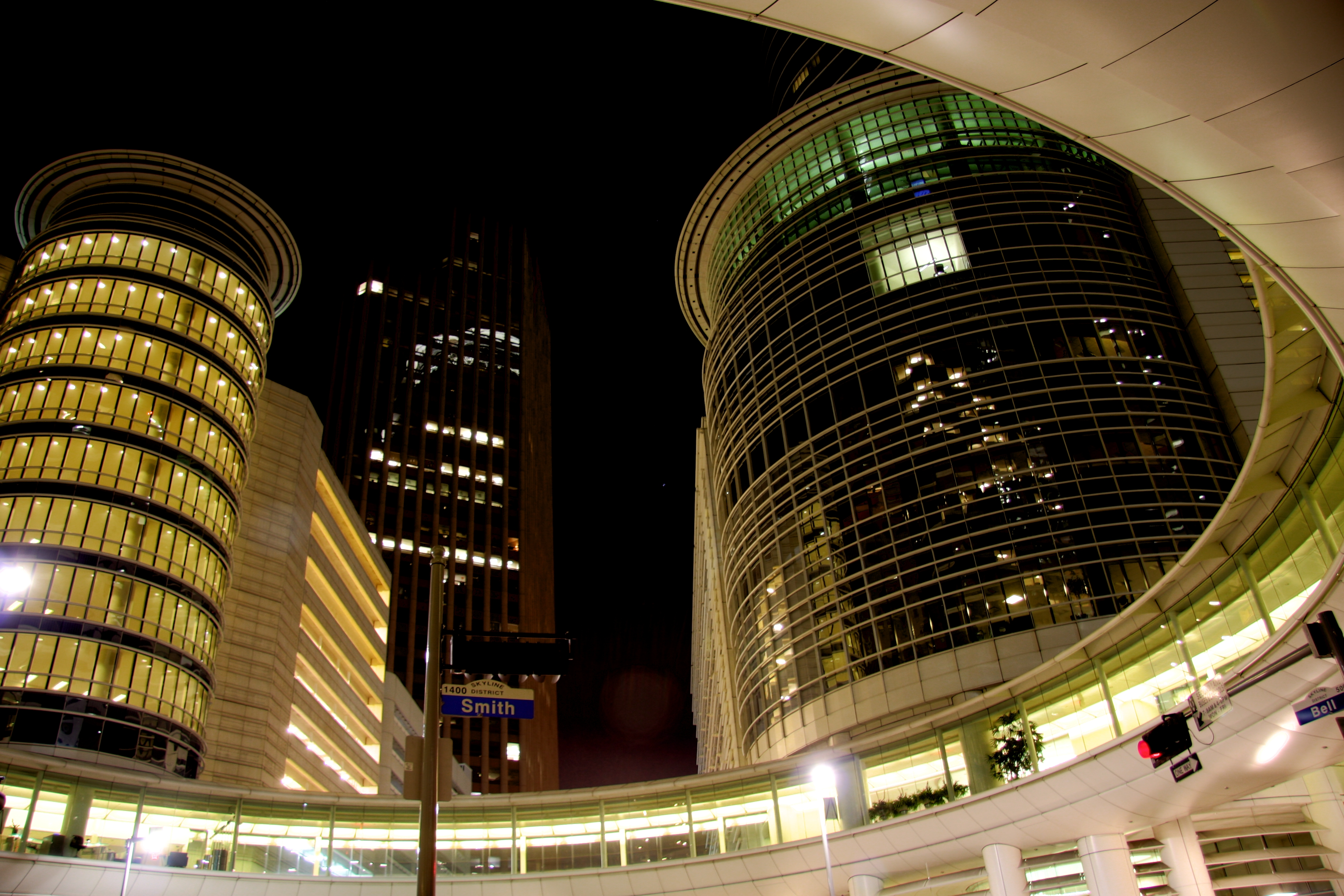
Chevron has its Houston offices at the 1400 Smith Street complex.

Houston is known as a world capital of the oil and gas industry with over 5000 energy firms doing business in the region in 2013. In 2026, 24 of the 27 Fortune 500 companies headquartered in Houston are energy-related enterprises.

Historically, Houston has had several growth spurts (and some devastating economic recessions) related to the oil industry. The discovery of oil near Houston in 1901 led to its first growth spurt — by the 1920s, Houston had grown to almost 140,000 people. The city is a leading domestic and international center for virtually every segment of the oil and gas industry - exploration, production, transmission, marketing, service, supply, offshore drilling, and technology. Houston dominates U.S. oil and gas exploration and production. The city remains unrivaled as a center for the American energy industry. In January 2005, the Houston Primary Metropolitan Statistical Areas (PMSA) accounted for: 31% of all U.S. jobs in oil and gas extraction (38,300 of 123,400), and 14% of all U.S. jobs in support activities for mining (28,100 of 200,900). In 2016, Houston was headquarters for 17 energy-related Fortune 500 companies and more than 3,600 energy-related establishments. Houston is home to 13 of the nation's 20 largest natural gas transmission companies, 600 exploration and production firms and more than 170 pipeline operators.

The Offshore Technology Conference held yearly in Houston presents the latest exploration and development technology in the energy industry to more than 50,000 attendees.

Houston is a member of the World Energy Cities Partnership, a collaboration between 13 energy focused cities around the world.

As of 2004, mining, which includes mostly oil and gas exploration and production in Houston, accounted for 11 percent the region's gross area product (GAP)—down from 21 percent as recently as 1985. The reduced role of oil and gas in Houston's GAP reflected the rapid growth of other sectors—such as engineering services, health services, and manufacturing. As of 2005, however, oil and gas exploration and production increased in reaction to high energy prices and a reduced worldwide surplus oil production capacity.

Members of the oil and gas industry are representatives of most of the boards of Houston's arts bodies, charities, and museums. The energy companies spent funds in order to make Houston a more attractive community for their employees to live in.

=== Petrochemicals ===
Houston is one of the world's largest manufacturing centers for petrochemicals, and the $15 billion petrochemical complex at the Houston Ship Channel is the largest in the country. Supporting the industry is a complex of several thousand miles of pipeline connecting 200 chemical plants, refinery, salt domes and fractionation plants along the Texas Gulf Coast, which allows transfer of feedstocks, fuel and chemical products among plants, storage terminals and transportation facilities. Houston has more than 400 chemical manufacturing establishments with more than 35,000 employees. Houston has two of four largest U.S. refineries. ExxonMobil’s complex in Baytown is one of the oldest in the area and one of the largest of its kind in the world

As of 2005, more than 235 establishments in the Houston metro area manufactured plastic and rubber products. Houston dominates the U.S. production of three major resins: polyethylene (38.7% of U.S. capacity); polyvinyl chloride (35.9% of U.S. capacity) and polypropylene (48.4% of U.S. capacity).

=== Aerospace ===
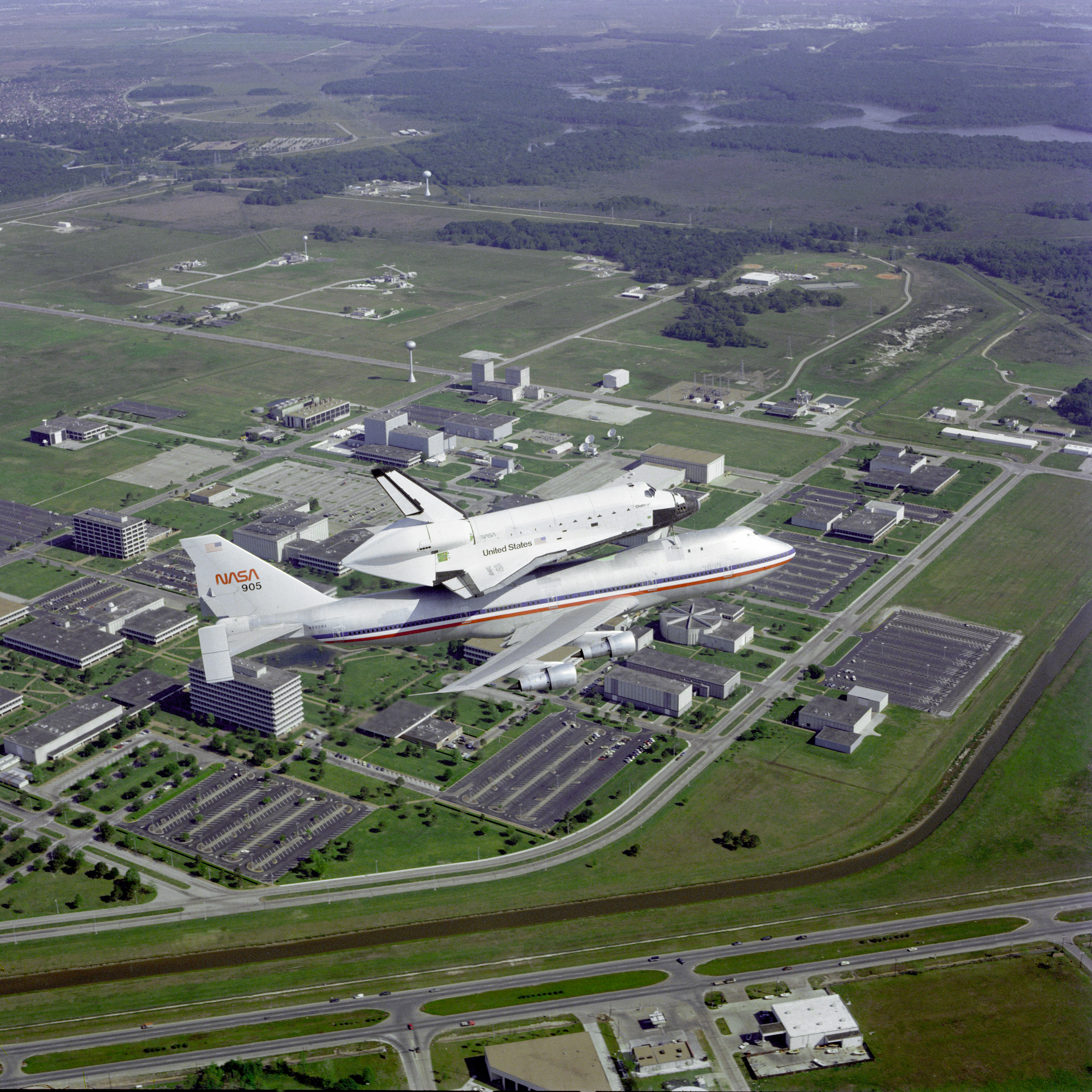
The space shuttle, atop its Boeing 747, flying over NASA's Johnson Space Center

Houston is home to the Johnson Space Center, NASA's largest research and development facility, employing, as of 2007, nearly 3,000 federal civil service workers and more than 14,000 contract personnel. Program offices for Project Constellation, Orion, and other new space vehicle projects will create new jobs at the center. The city's burgeoning aerospace industry heralded its second growth spurt, which solidified with the 1973 oil crisis. The majority of the contractor work force related to the projects will also be located at the center. Texas Governor Rick Perry recently announced a $7.5 million Texas Enterprise Fund (TEF) grant to Lockheed Martin, which will bring about 1,000 jobs to the Houston area. The grant ensures that Lockheed Martin will create these jobs in the Houston area after they earned a multibillion-dollar contract from NASA to build the Orion Crew Exploration Vehicle. Houston is also home to the United Space Alliance, which employs well over 10,000 people.

== Trade ==
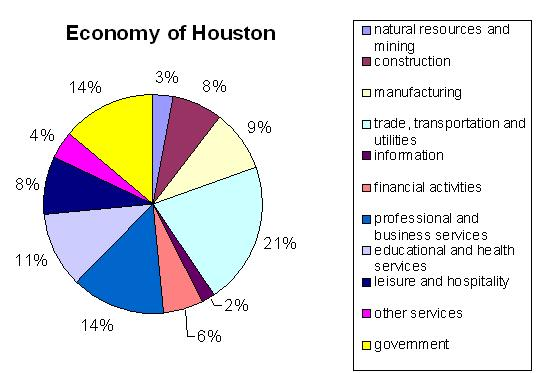
A graph showing the major sectors of the Houston economy

Much of Houston's success as a petrochemical complex is due to its busy man-made ship channel, the Port of Houston. The port ranks first in the country in international commerce and is the sixth-largest port in the world. Amid other U.S. ports, it is the busiest in foreign tonnage and second in overall tonnage. Because of these economic trades, many residents have moved to Houston from other U.S. states, as well as hundreds of countries worldwide.

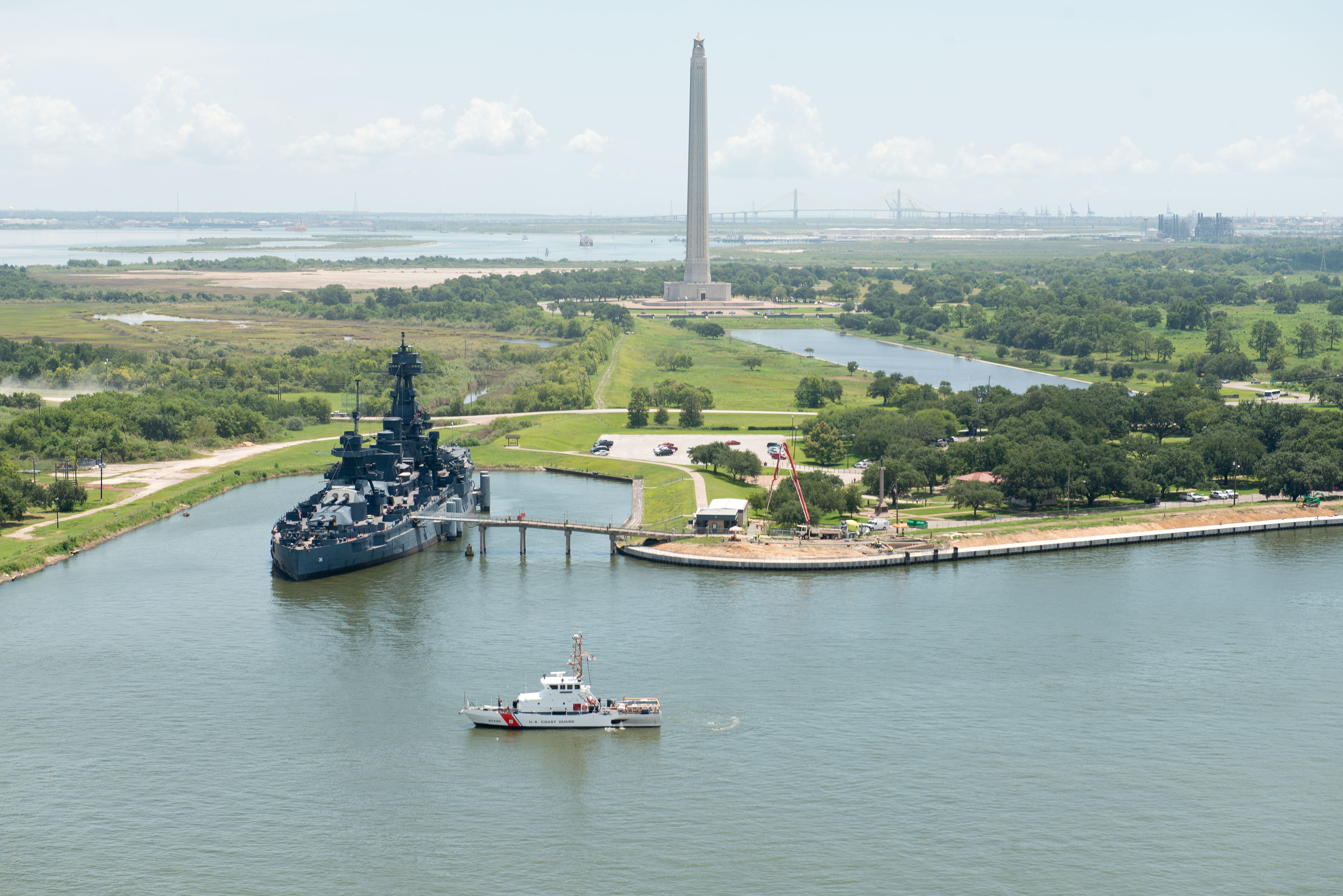
Houston Ship Channel

The coffee companies of Houston formed the Greater Houston Coffee Association in fall 2000. The industry then tried to make Houston a major coffee shipping port. Coffee sold through futures contracts may only be shipped to a New York Board of Trade-certified port, and Texas's ad valorem tax on warehouse inventories made it impossible for Houston to get such a certification. The tax was written into the Constitution of Texas, so the Greater Houston Coffee Association asked State Representative Joe E. Moreno and State Senator Mario Gallegos to present a constitutional amendment bill to exempt cocoa and coffee stored in Harris County warehouses from the tax. Voters approved the amendment in 2001. Since then Houston's role as a coffee port increased. After Hurricane Katrina hit New Orleans, much of the traffic switched to Houston.

Demand on Texas oil increased, and many people from the northeast moved to Houston to profit from the trade. Pasadena has refineries, and the Port of Houston is among the busiest in the world. Since the 1980s oil bust, the Houston area aimed to diversify its industries.

== Employment ==
In 2013, Houston was identified as the #1 U.S. city for job creation by the U.S. Bureau of Statistics after it was not only the first major city to regain all the jobs lost in the preceding economic downturn, but after the crash, more than two jobs were added for every one lost. Economist and vice president of research at the Greater Houston Partnership Patrick Jankowski attributed Houston's success to the ability of the region's real estate and energy industries to learn from historical mistakes. Furthermore, Jankowski stated that "more than 100 foreign-owned companies relocated, expanded or started new businesses in Houston" between 2008 and 2010, and this openness to external business boosted job creation during a period when domestic demand was problematically low.

As of 2009 Walmart was the largest employer in Houston, with 31,900 employees. The second-largest was Administaff (now Insperity), with fewer than 21,900 employees.

== Tourism ==
Tourist attractions in the Houston area include Space Center Houston and the original La Casida and Ninfa's. Previous attractions included tours of the Houston Astrodome and Gilley's. The Houston Bay Area and Galveston also have many other tourist attractions, including a Schlitterbahn Water Park, Kemah Boardwalk, Moody Gardens, beaches, fishing, pleasure boats, and many local seafood restaurants. The Houston Museum District, Houston Theater District in Downtown, and The Galleria are also heavily visited tourist attractions.

On July 26, 2003, the Greater Houston Convention and Visitors Bureau started "The Neighborhoods Alive: Houston's Multicultural Tour," a bus tour throughout several neighborhoods in inner Houston. The tour's destinations included Downtown Houston, the First Ward, the Second Ward, the Third Ward, the Sixth Ward, East Downtown, and Midtown. Two later bookings, those for August 23, 2003 and September 2003, quickly sold out. Therefore, the bureau added six more dates on short notice.

Around 2006 Taiwanese people became owners of several independent and small chain hotels in the Houston area. In December 2006 C.Y. Ling, the director of the commercial division of the Taipei Economic and Cultural Office in Houston, said that Taiwanese owned more hotels than any other ethnic group except for the Indians.

== Retail ==
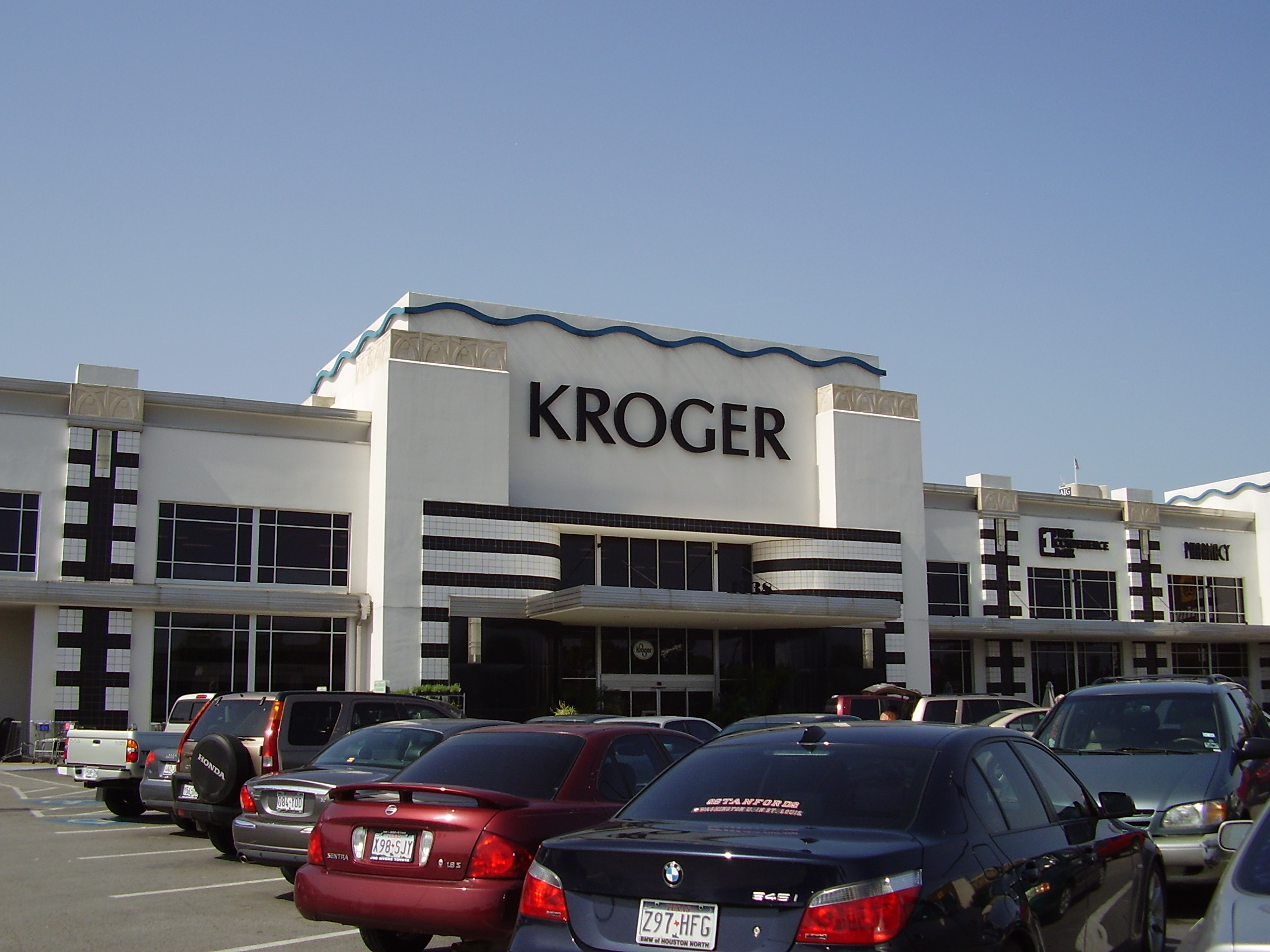
The Kroger supermarket in the River Oaks Shopping Center

In 1980, a year of strong economic activity and robust competition in the grocery market, prices in Houston's grocery stores were below the national average prices in grocery stores. Houston's grocery price index averaged at 85.6, below the national average of 88.4. This means that, for the 1982-1984 base period, Houstonians paid $88.40 for an amount of food that would cost $100 according to the national average. During the oil bust and the economic decline, Houston's prices stayed even with the national average. In 1983 Houston's grocery index increased from 96.8 to 99.4 and matched the national average of 99.1. As the city began to recover, the prices began to edge upward. When a recession in the U.S. began and while Houston's economic growth slowed and continued, the national price index fell below Houston's price index. As of 1992 prices in Houston's grocery stores were higher than the national average; Houston's index averaged to be 137.3, and the national average was 132.3.

Nic Santangelo, an analyst of the Bureau of Labor Statistics, a department of the U.S. Department of Labor that composes the monthly consumer price index, said in 1992 "We have a difficult time explaining why Houston food prices go one way, Dallas another, and the nation yet another." A person quoted in the Houston Post described as an industry insider said that when companies in the Houston grocery market left, the surviving competitors "got comfortable" and raised prices. Tammy Bobon, a director of public affairs for AppleTree Markets, said that the Houston grocery market had remained competitive for the entire period.

As of 2015 the largest grocers in the Houston market by the number of locations were Kroger, with 107 stores and 5 planned stores; H-E-B, with 90 stores and 8 planned stores; Walmart, with 78 stores and one planned store; Target, with 35 stores; Fiesta Mart, with 34 stores; Lewis Food Town, with 32 stores; Randalls Food Markets, with 30 stores; Aldi, with 21 stores; Sam's Club, with 20 stores; Sellers Bros., with 11 stores; Foodarama and Whole Foods Market, with 10 stores each; Costco Wholesale and Sprouts Farmers Market, with six stores each; and The Fresh Market and Trader Joe's, with four stores each. As of 2007, the largest grocers in the Houston market were Wal-Mart, Kroger, H-E-B, Safeway Inc. (as Randalls Food Markets), Grocers Supply Company (as Fiesta Mart), Target, Lewis Food Town, Gerlands Food Fair, Brookshire Brothers, and Sellers Bros.

== Media ==
Houston is the tenth largest television market in the United States. While Houston is the fourth largest city in the United States, other cities that are smaller than Houston have metropolitan regions that are larger than Houston's.

== See also ==
- List of companies in Houston
