= Market Basket (Louisiana and Texas) =

American supermarket chain

Market Basket Foods
- Trade name: Market Basket
- Type: Private
- Industry: Retail (Grocery)
- Founded: 1962 (64 years ago) in Nederland, Texas, United States
- Founder: Bruce Thompson, Ed Hughes
- Headquarters: Nederland, Texas, United States
- Number of locations: 34
- Area served: Texas and Louisiana
- Key people: Skylar Thompson (President)
- Products: Bakery, Dairy, Deli, Frozen Foods, Grocery, Meat, Health & Beauty Aids, Produce, Seafood, Snacks, Beer & Wine
- Services: Supermarkets
- Revenue: US$58 million (2021)
- Owners: Hughes family
- Number of employees: 2,201 (2021)
- Website: marketbasketfoods.com

Market Basket Foods, under the trade name Market Basket, is a chain of 34 supermarkets that serves southeast Texas and Louisiana in the United States, with headquarters in Nederland, Texas.

== History ==
Johnnie Alford, Ed Hughes, Howard Hatfield, Roy Theriot and Bruce Thompson founded Market Basket in early 1962. Each was an independent grocer, owning one store each. The five grocers joined together to keep advertising costs low and pool their purchasing power. Three of the grocers remained one-supermarket operators while Hughes and Thompson formed a 50-50 corporation for joint expansion.

Thompson and Hughes bought four stores as partners in the 1960s. During the early 1970s they obtained former A&P, Kroger and Weingarten's stores in Lake Charles, Beaumont, Port Arthur and Orange. In 1983, Bruce Thompson purchased Hughes’ interest in their jointly held corporation.

During the 1980s, two new stores were constructed, and the chain grew with the acquisition of 14 more stores formerly operated by Piggly Wiggly, Safeway, Theriot’s, Winn-Dixie, and Weingarten's.

The next decade saw Market Basket begin an extensive remodeling and expansion program for half of the chain. More stores in the 1990s were acquired, including four cash and carry locations and three AppleTree stores. The Mauriceville location was replaced with a newly constructed store during this time.

During the summer of 2001, the company purchased two Hughes Market Basket stores, in Port Arthur and Nederland. In 2002, the grocer purchased two Price-Lo stores in Vidor and DeRidder. Stanley’s in Leesville and Pair’s in Winnie were added, as well.
