= Leura Collins =

American labor union member

Leura Collins was a member of Retail Clerks Union Local 455 and subject of a workplace theft investigation that resulted in the 1975 Supreme Court of the United States case NLRB v. J. Weingarten, Inc., 420 U.S. 251 (1975).

== History ==
Weingarten Inc. was founded in 1948 as a retailer. By 1972, Weingarten Inc. operated 100 stores, some of which included "lunch counters", and others which included "lobby food operations." These counters/lobbies provided eat-in or carry-out dining options for customers. Collins was employed from 1961-1970 at store #2 as a "lunch counter" sales person. She transferred to store #98 where she was a sales person at the "lobby food operation."

Loss Prevention Specialists were employed by Weingarten Inc and operated at the companies stores undercover, sometimes unbeknownst to management to observe/apprehend people suspected of theft, including employees. In June 1972, Loss Prevention Specialist "Hardy" observed the lobby operation at store #98 for 2 days (without the knowledge of management) to investigate a report that Collins was stealing money from the cash register. Hardy disclosed his presence to the store manager only after his 2-day investigation turned up no evidence. The store manager then told Hardy that he was just informed by a coworker that Collins had taken a $2.98 box of chicken and put only $1 into the cash register. Collins was then interviewed by both Hardy and the store manager.

== Interview #1 ==
Collins repeatedly requested union representation at the meeting, but her requests were denied. The interview continued and Collins explained that the "lobby" had run out of small boxes, so she had to use the large size ($2.98) box to hold her small ($1) order of chicken. Hardy left the interview and was able to verify with another employee that they had indeed run out of small boxes, and the employee who reported her was unaware of how many pieces of chicken were in the box. Hardy returned to the interview and apologized for the confusion and informed Collins that his investigation was over.

== Interview #2 ==
Collins then burst into tears and proclaimed the only thing she ever took was her free lunch. Hardy and the manager were surprised to hear this because their understanding was that free lunches were provided in stores with "lunch counters" (e.g. #2), but not in those with "lobby food operations" (e.g. #98). A new interrogation proceeded and Collins' renewed request for union representation was again denied. Hardy computed a total of $160 owed the company by Collins for these free lunches. However, a call to company headquarters revealed much confusion regarding the companies 2 different free lunch policies. In fact, most other employees at the "lobby food operation" at store #98, including the manager, had taken free lunches. The store manager asked Collins to keep the interview confidential, but she informed her union shop steward.

== See also ==
- Weingarten Rights
