= Grocers Supply =

American wholesale grocery distributor

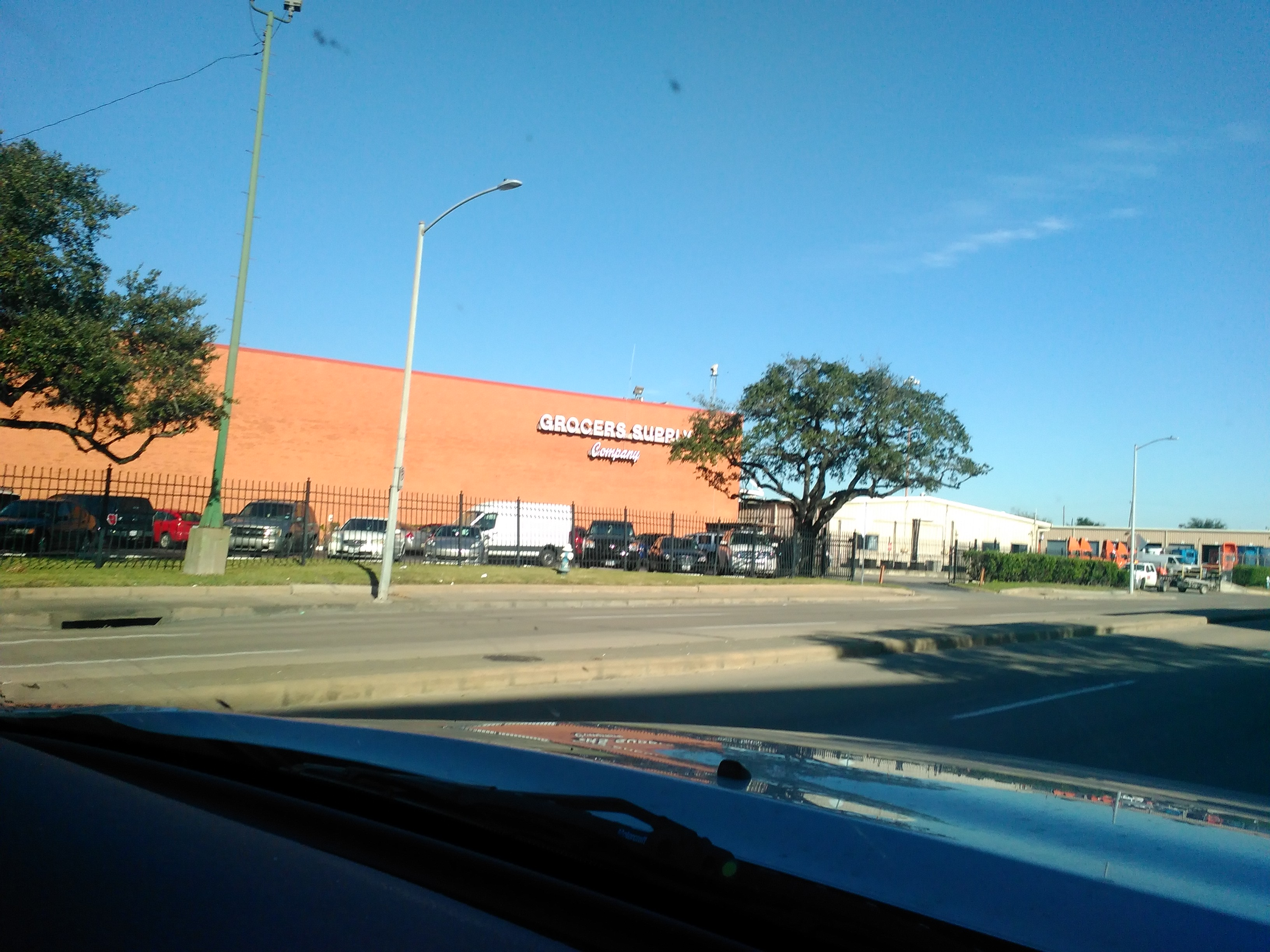
Headquarters

The Grocers Supply Co., Inc. is a wholesale grocery distributor with its headquarters in the Southeast Houston district, Houston, Texas. As of 2011, it was the largest grocery wholesale company in the Southwest United States.

David Kaplan and Nancy Sarnoff of the Houston Chronicle said that the company is "low-profile" and is most well known for the orange trucks. They said that it was one of the "strongest" American regional wholesalers. As of 2004 Grocers Supply had over 2,100 employees; most of them are in Houston. As of 2004, Grocer's Supply served Davis Food City, Fiesta Mart, Foodarama, Gerland's, Lewis Food Town, Rice Epicurean Markets, and Sellers Bros.

The company services an area within a 350-mile (560 km) radius of the center of Houston. It services 1,200 convenience stores, over 650 grocery stores, and 200 schools.

The company's main facility has over 747,752 square feet (69,468.4 m^{2}) of space. A 211,611-square-foot (19,659.3 m^{2}) cooler and freezer is across the street from the main warehouse. Grocers Supply has four satellite warehouses, all in Houston.

In 2014, Grocers Supply was acquired by C&S Wholesale Grocers.

== History ==
Joe Levit, an immigrant from Russia, began a grocery wholesale business when he leased a 7,500-square-foot (700 m^{2}) three-story building in the "Produce Row" area of Houston. In 1928 the company moved its operations to the warehouse, larger than the previous facility, in Downtown Houston, near the Buffalo Bayou. In 1936, the facility flooded. The company moved to a three-story building at the intersection of Commerce and Jackson. The company later moved to another building in North Jackson.

In 1956, the company moved its operations to its current location. The facilities there had been expanded on several occasions. The company's new cooler and freezer opened in 1983, across the street from its main warehouse. At the time it had 105,000 square feet (9,800 m^{2}) of space. This facility was later expanded.

In 2003, the company generated sales of $1.5 billion.

By 2004, Grocers Supply had purchased the Handy Andy grocery chain, which was previously owned by H.A. Assets. Grocers Supply formed the subsidiary Bexar County Markets so it could manage the Handy Andy locations. In 2004 there were ten Handy Andy locations. By 2012, Handy Andy had a different owner.

In 2004, Grocers Supply purchased Fiesta Mart, a supermarket chain. Prior to the purchase, Fiesta was the company's largest customer. According to David Kaplan and Nancy Sarnoff of the Houston Chronicle, a local grocery industry member who wished to remain anonymous said that the acquisition was beneficial for both firms. He said that the acquisition protected Grocers Supply since it ensured that it would not lose Fiesta; if Fiesta was sold to another company, there was the possibility that Fiesta could switch to another grocery supplier. Kaplan and Sarnoff said that the anonymous employee added that the acquisition allowed Fiesta to get access to more capital and growth potential. The Levit family kept Fiesta until 2015, when it was sold to Acon Investments, a company based in Washington, DC.
