= Stanley Stores =

American regional grocery store chain

Stanley Stores Inc.
- Type: Private
- Industry: Grocery retail
- Founded: 1945
- Founder: O. B. Stanley
- Headquarters: Bay City, Texas, United States
- Area served: Texas; Louisiana
- Key people: Fred C. Stanley (President)
- Products: Groceries
- Brands: Stanley Stores; Price Lo Supermarkets; Foods "4" Less

Stanley Stores Inc. was a family-owned regional grocery store chain in the United States, with its headquarters in Bay City, Texas. The chain operated three brands. Stanley Stores was the conventional grocery store brand. The Houston Chronicle said that the brands Price Lo Supermarkets and Foods "4" Less were "modern, warehouse-type food stores with large sales and cut-rate prices." In 1994 Greg Hassel of the Houston Chronicle said that Stanley Stores was one of several "small area outfits" operating stores in the Houston area.

== History ==
O. B. Stanley established the chain in 1945. The first location, a drive-in grocery in Bay City, Texas, was the 880-square-foot (82 m^{2}) Stanley's Superette. Originally O. B. Stanley served as the president of Stanley Stores. Fred C. Stanley became the president of Stanley Stores in 1962. At its peak the chain operated 33 stores.

In 1988 Stanley Stores had 30 locations in Texas and Louisiana. At that period the stores ranged in size between 20,000 square feet (1,900 m^{2}) and 46,000 square feet (4,300 m^{2}). During that year, it opened two new stores in Houston, including one 30,655-square-foot (2,847.9 m^{2}) location and one 29,730-square-foot (2,762 m^{2}) location. O. B. Stanley, in regards to the changes in size, said "We've gotten a little bigger since then. Our operations have changed with the times."

Around January 1994, Stanley Stores acquired the Lake Jackson Appletree Markets location after the chain sold many of its locations. In December 1994, Stanley Stores filed for Chapter 11 reorganization in a federal bankruptcy court in Houston. It owed Grocers Supply Inc. $14 million. At the time, it had 29 stores in Texas and Louisiana and 1,400 employees. By February 1995, seven stores had closed. In November 1995, Stanley Stores reached an agreement to get out of bankruptcy protection. At that time it had 15 stores and 750 employees. Fred Stanley, then still serving as president of the chain, died on Monday, July 12, 1999 from cancer.

The chain made several donations to the Bay City Museum.
