= Minyard Food Stores =

Former supermarket chain in Texas, USA

Minyard Food Stores, Inc.
- Company type: Private
- Industry: Retail
- Founded: 1932
- Defunct: 2016
- Headquarters: Carrollton, Texas, United States
- Key people: Frances Nelson, President; Bill Davidson General Manager
- Products: Grocery
- Revenue: ▼US$665 million 2009
- Number of employees: ~1,500

RLS Supermarkets LLC, doing business as Minyard Food Stores, was a privately owned supermarket chain in Texas.

== History ==
=== Early years ===
The history of Minyard Food Stores dates back to the 1930s. A.W. "Eck" Minyard, a postal employee, purchased a store at 6011 Lindsley Avenue in East Dallas for $1,200. His primary motivation for the purchase was to provide jobs for his two younger brothers, H.C. "Henry" and M.T. "Buddy" Minyard, who had just completed high school. At that time, the country was in the depths of the Great Depression and jobs were scarce. On February 12, 1932, the first Minyard Food Store opened around the corner from the Minyard family home. The clapboard store was 540 square feet (50 m^{2}) in size. A.W. Minyard initially continued his job as a postal worker while running the store on Sundays. He would later quit the postal job to focus fully on the grocery business. His sister Fay and another brother, H.J. "Hap" Minyard had joined the others by the late 1930s. The store was successful enough to spawn the opening of another store and a convenience store by the close of the decade. When the United States entered World War II, the younger Minyard brothers joined the military. A.W. and Fay Minyard, closed all of the stores, with the exception of the original East Dallas location. After the war, a total of three new stores opened during the 1940s.

=== Growth ===
The 1950s were a decade of growth for Minyard stores. Six new stores were opened, including the first outside of Dallas County in McKinney in 1957. In 1959, the business opened its largest store to date in Lancaster. At 25,000 square feet (2,300 m^{2}), the Lancaster Minyard featured new technology such as mercury vapor lighting, a 200-car parking lot, automatic air-opened doors, background music, and air-conditioning. By 1960, the 11 Minyard Food Stores generated sales of $15 million. Additional sites were purchased for future expansion and in 1961, a 70,000-square-foot (6,500 m^{2}) complex on Cedar Springs Street in Dallas became the site of Minyard's central office and distribution operations. By the end of the 1960s, the company had a total of 16 stores.

=== Rapid Expansion ===
An additional 21 stores opened during the 1970s. By 1978, nine shopping centers were also owned by Minyard Properties, Inc. In 1979, a store opened in Mesquite that introduced bar codes and scanning to the chain. Plans for a new corporate headquarters were spearheaded by Bob and H.C. "Henry" Minyard. Henry, however, suffered a fatal heart attack on December 25, 1979, and didn't live to see the ground broken on the new complex. Bob Minyard was named president of the company. In August 1981, the corporate headquarters and distribution center moved to a 394,954-square-foot (36,692.4 m^{2}) facility in Coppell, between the cities of Dallas and Fort Worth. By its 50th anniversary in 1982, the company operated 53 stores. That same year, a new concept store, the Sack 'n Save Warehouse Food Store, was introduced. The store, located in Haltom City, offered products in bulk at reduced prices. This new concept was considered necessary to remain competitive in the grocery industry, which faced slow growth during the mid-1980s. In 1987, Minyard purchased 24 stores from Safeway Stores, Inc., which exited the Dallas-Fort Worth market. This boosted the company's presences in the area. A total of 12 stores were bought in Dallas County, nine in neighboring Tarrant County, and three in other counties. Minyard was able to reopen all 24 stores within a record five days. By the end of 1987, the company owned and operated 62 Minyard Food Stores and 10 Sack 'n Save stores. Less than a year after the major acquisition, chairman and CEO M.T. "Buddy" Minyard died of a heart attack. Leadership of the company passed to his two daughters, Lisbeth "Liz" Minyard and Gretchen Minyard Williams and CEO J. L. "Sonny" Williams

=== Increased competition ===
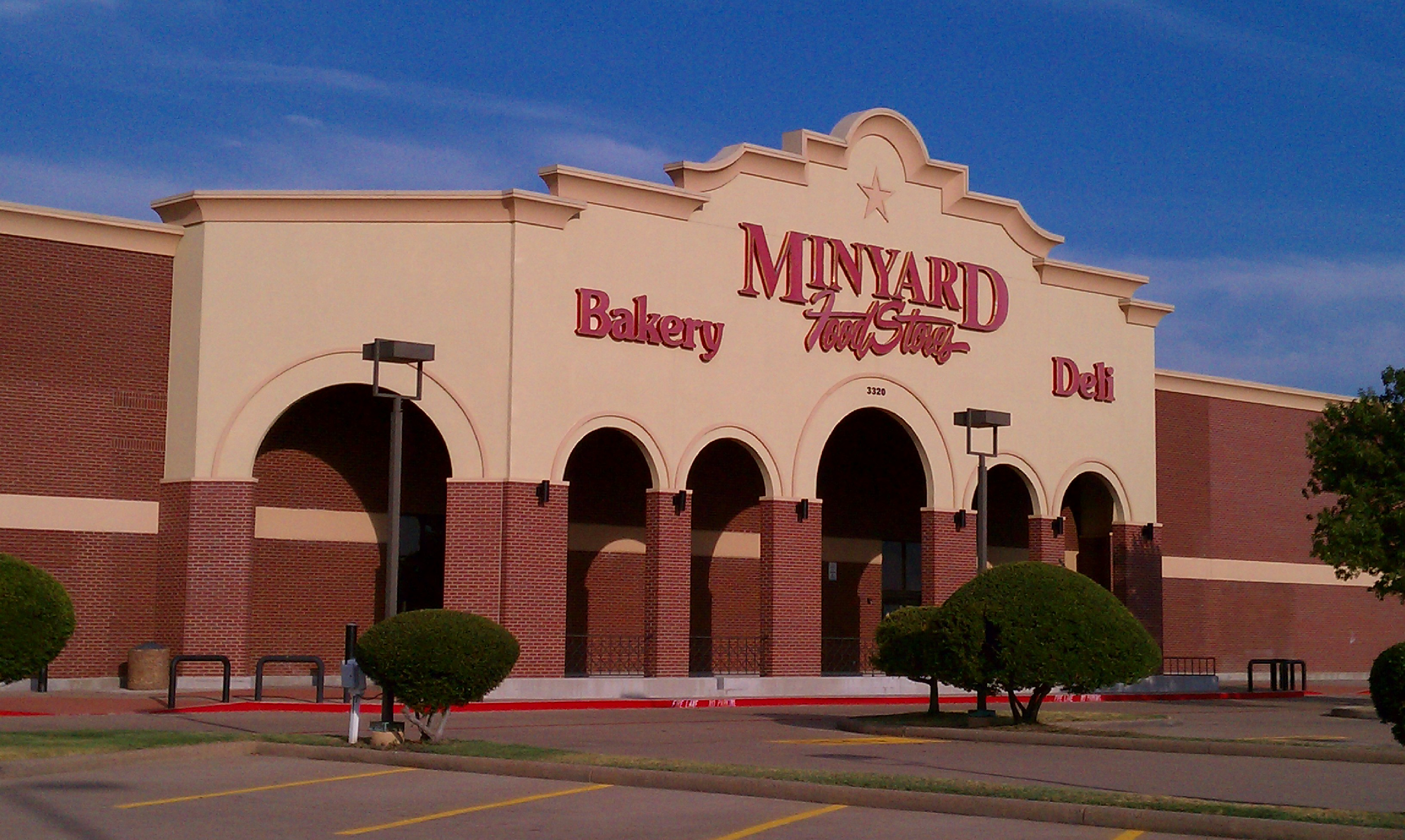
Former Minyard Food Stores in Plano, Texas.

In 1990, the company announced that it would open a new store format dedicated to the growing, mostly under-served minority population in ethnic neighborhoods. Operating under the name Carnival Food Stores, ethnic merchandise was offered in addition to traditional grocery products depending on the neighborhood it served. Three Carnival Food Stores opened in Fort Worth in the summer of 1990. Two catered to African Americans and one focused on Hispanic shoppers. The concept proved to be successful and Minyard announced plans to open four additional Carnival Food Stores by late 1991. A total of 21 Carnival stores were operating by the end of the decade.

The 1990s were a period of increased competition in the Dallas-Fort Worth area grocery market. In addition to longtime competitors such as Kroger and Tom Thumb, new chains were also entering the market. The most notable entrant was North Carolina-based Food Lion, which planned on opening 50 stores in the area. Minyard focused on improving customer service to deal with the growing competition. Store expansion slowed, although new stores were opened in strategic locations. By the mid-1990s, the company had managed to survive the stiff challenges from other chains. Food Lion began closing stores in 1994 and exited Texas in 1997. In 1996, Minyard was the third-largest grocery chain in Dallas-Fort Worth, behind Tom Thumb and Albertsons. In January 1997, the company entered into the gasoline business by opening two gas stations adjacent to two Minyard supermarkets in Dallas. By the end of 1999, the number of Minyard-owned gas stations had risen to twelve.

Throughout Minyard's Food Store existence Minyard's would sponsor all local sports team in fact former CEO J.L. “Sonny” Williams and Gretchen Minyard Williams was longtime owner of the Dallas Sidekicks (1984-2004) from 1996 to 2004.

On October 29, 2004, after 72 years in business, the Minyard family sold Minyard Food Stores, Inc. to Acquisition Vehicle Texas II, LLC, an investment company conducting business under name Minyard Group. Q Investments, the ultimate owner of Minyard, began selling off the stores slowly. With its market share declining due to pressure from larger chains (such as Walmart putting full grocery stores in their Walmart Supercenters, and Target doing the same), Minyard sold its 37 Carnival stores to a group including Houston-based Fiesta Mart, Inc. in 2008. Minyard also closed or sold its Sack N Save stores to independent operators: the last one (in Denton) would close and the property sold to the University of North Texas.

In May 2011, 10 Minyard locations were acquired by RLS Supermarkets of Carrollton. RLS kept the Minyard name on all of them; the locations included Dallas, Duncanville, Balch Springs, Fort Worth, Irving, Lancaster, and Mesquite. In late 2014, Minyard purchased stores from Albertsons and Tom Thumb as part of anti-trust settlements resulting from Albertsons’ merger with Safeway (Tom Thumb's corporate parent).

== Closure of Brand ==
In July 2016 Minyard announced the sale of all Minyard-label stores and two Sun Fresh Market stores to Fiesta Mart. The remaining Sun Fresh Market stores would be operated by RLS, but the sale resulted in the Minyard name disappearing from the DFW landscape with the exception of a single store which operated until August 17, 2017, which ended the 85-year old Minyard chain.

== Corporate affairs ==
For a period of time Minyard had its headquarters in Coppell (a replica of Minyard's original store, formerly at the headquarters location, was relocated to Coppell's Old Town area). At a later point Minyard had its headquarters in Irving.

== See also ==
- List of supermarket chains in the United States
