= Cottage Grove, Houston =

Community in Houston, Texas, US

Coordinates: 29.788°N 95.429°W

Cottage Grove is a community in Houston, Texas.

== History ==
Cottage Grove was established around 1910 by the Bankers Trust Company as one of Houston's early suburbs. "". Based on newspaper ads from the period, the neighborhood development was remarkably similar to the "build on your own lot" homes that are common in Houston suburbs today. The neighborhood was known for its unique homes on large lots surrounded by large pine trees.

From the 1920s onward the neighborhood was a hub of activity. Insurance maps housed in the Houston Metropolitan Research Center show a bustling neighborhood full of homes, grocery stores, bars and other small businesses.

Cottage Grove Grocery Store, 1919 Detering (Demolished during I-10 Construction)

Around 2005 many young professionals and empty nesters began settling in Cottage Grove. Earvin Smith, the civic club president, said that the resulting increase in taxes are forcing senior citizens with fixed incomes to leave the neighborhood.

Around 2011 the company Houston InTown Homes planned to build new houses in the community. The first phase, consisting of 230 houses, would enlarge Cottage Grove by one third.

== Cityscape ==
Cottage Grove is located inside the 610 Loop, in proximity to Memorial Park. The neighborhood is located between Shepherd Drive and Westcott Avenue, with Interstate 10 (Katy Freeway) running through the community. The streets in Cottage Grove are narrow. The neighborhood has few parking areas and few sidewalks. Mike Snyder of the Houston Chronicle said in 2009 that Cottage Grove does not have good drainage. The original houses in the neighborhood consisted of cottages.

=== Houses ===
Mary-Jane Buschlen, a resident of Cottage Grove quoted in the Houston Chronicle said that there were no new townhouses being built in Cottage Grove in 1995. She also said that flooding had never occurred before the early 1990s. As of 2005 the neighborhood had not yet been completely built out, contrasting with other area neighborhoods. Due to an increase in demand, around that year, developers began building new houses in Cottage Grove. The new housing styles included patio houses and townhouses. In a two-year period ending in May 2005, land prices increased from $9 ($15.38 in current money) per square foot to $20 ($32.2 in current money) per square foot. This would be an increase in $100,000 for a 5,000-square-foot (460 m^{2}) lot. In 2005 some houses were priced up to $280,000 ($450795.71 in current money).

By 2009 many large townhouses had been built in the community. Many lots that previously held one cottage began holding multiple townhouses. During that year Snyder said that car owners heavy rains in the neighborhood result in standing water and many cars are parked on the sides of the street in both directions. In 2007, Tom Murphy, a former Mayor of Pittsburgh and a senior fellow of the Urban Land Institute, visited Cottage Grove. After seeing the large houses in crowded conditions, Murphy said "It was shocking to see this jewel of a neighborhood in this condition. It was about the ugliest thing I’d ever seen, to be honest with you.” In 2011, Jerry Wood, an independent consultant advising the City of Houston on issues related to the U.S. Census and a former City of Houston deputy assistant of planning and development, said "In Cottage Grove, three-and four-story townhouses are replacing bungalows at a high rate" Buschlen said in 2011 that about 70% of the houses on her street were newly built. She argued that the development had occurred faster than the infrastructure could handle, and that the development should have been better planned; she explained that new development caused many of the trees in the neighborhood to be destroyed, and flooding occurred regularly.

In 2010 InTown Homes planned to prices 365 houses within Cottage Grove from $275,000 ($396532.12 in current money) to $550,000 ($793064.25 in current money).

== Government and infrastructure ==
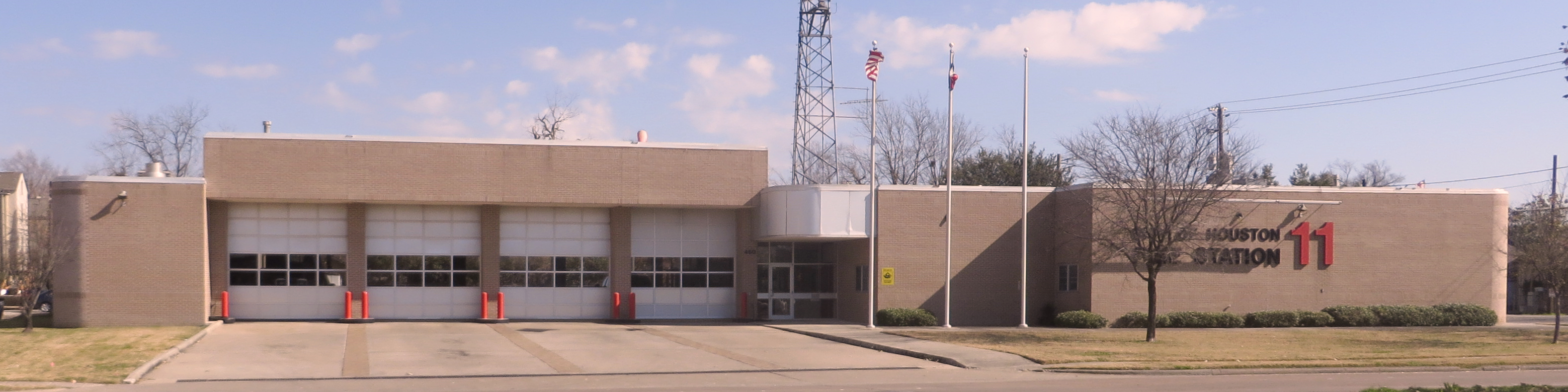
Houston Fire Department Station 11

The community is within Houston City Council District C. In the 2000s and the 1990s the community was in District H. The community is within the Washington Avenue/Memorial Park Super Neighborhood. The super neighborhood was recognized on March 6, 2000.

Houston Fire Department Station 11 is located at 460 T. C. Jester in Cottage Grove.

== Economy ==
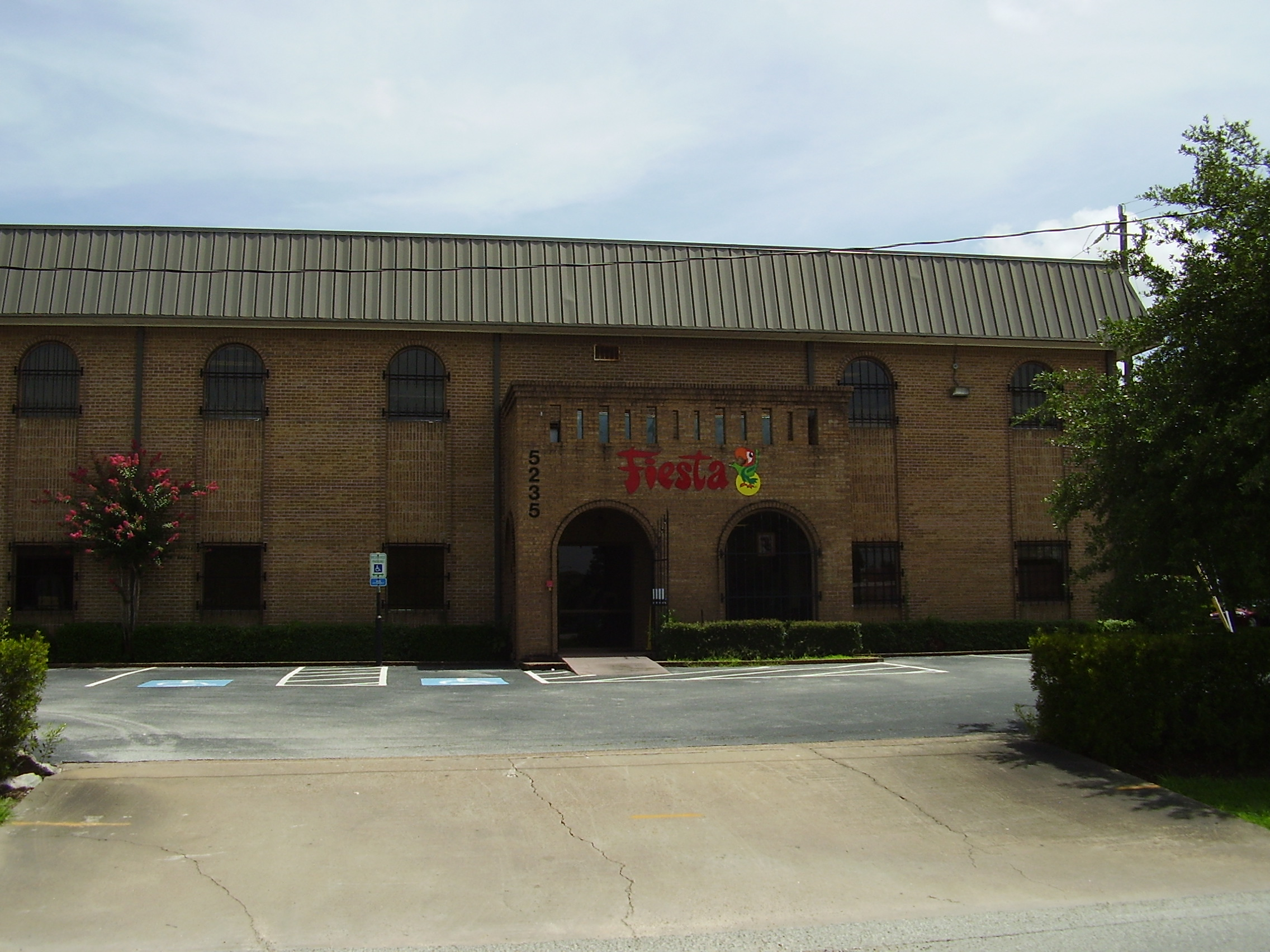
Fiesta Mart headquarters

The Cottage Grove area was once home to the headquarters of Fiesta Mart. It was demolished in the 2010s and is still a vacant lot as of late 2020.

== Education ==
Cottage Grove is within the Houston Independent School District. Most residents are zoned to Memorial Elementary School, while some are zoned to Love Elementary School. All residents are zoned to Hogg Middle School in Norhill. Most residents are zoned to Waltrip High School, while some are zoned to Lamar High School in Upper Kirby.

The community was previously zoned to Stevenson Elementary School, located on land in Sections 2 and 3, and named after Robert Louis Stevenson. The school opened in 1915 as Cottage Grove High School. In 1927 the school was remodeled and given its final name. According to Lisa Sacaris, the educational liaison of the Cottage Grove Civic Association, the school had a capacity of around 450 students. Around 2007, the school district considered closing Stevenson. Sacaris added that the school was just beginning to attract families with young children before the school district announced a plan to close the school. The community was creating a plan to recruit additional families to the school.

In May 2011 the school had 357 students. At that time the school district proposed closing the school and rezoning children to Memorial and Love Elementary Schools in order to cut costs. Sacaris, who stated her opposition to the closure, argued that the plan would not reduce costs because the district would have to spend more money to send school buses to send children to more distant schools. Sacaris also said that InTown Homes's plans to build 230 houses in the Stevenson attendance zone and the school's "Leader In Me Academy" are reasons to keep the school open. Jane West, the president of the superneighborhood that includes Cottage Grove, said that the school district would need the school's capacity within several years. West also stated that after the district closed nearby Ben Milam Elementary School, it was converted into a private preschool.

The school district closed Stevenson in 2011. The post-closure preliminary Texas Education Agency 2011 rating was "Exemplary." The school district promoted the already-closed school as one of the 59 HISD schools that received exemplary ratings. The TEA ratings of Memorial and Love decreased from 2010 to 2011. Sacaris said that the news was "bittersweet."

== Parks and recreation ==
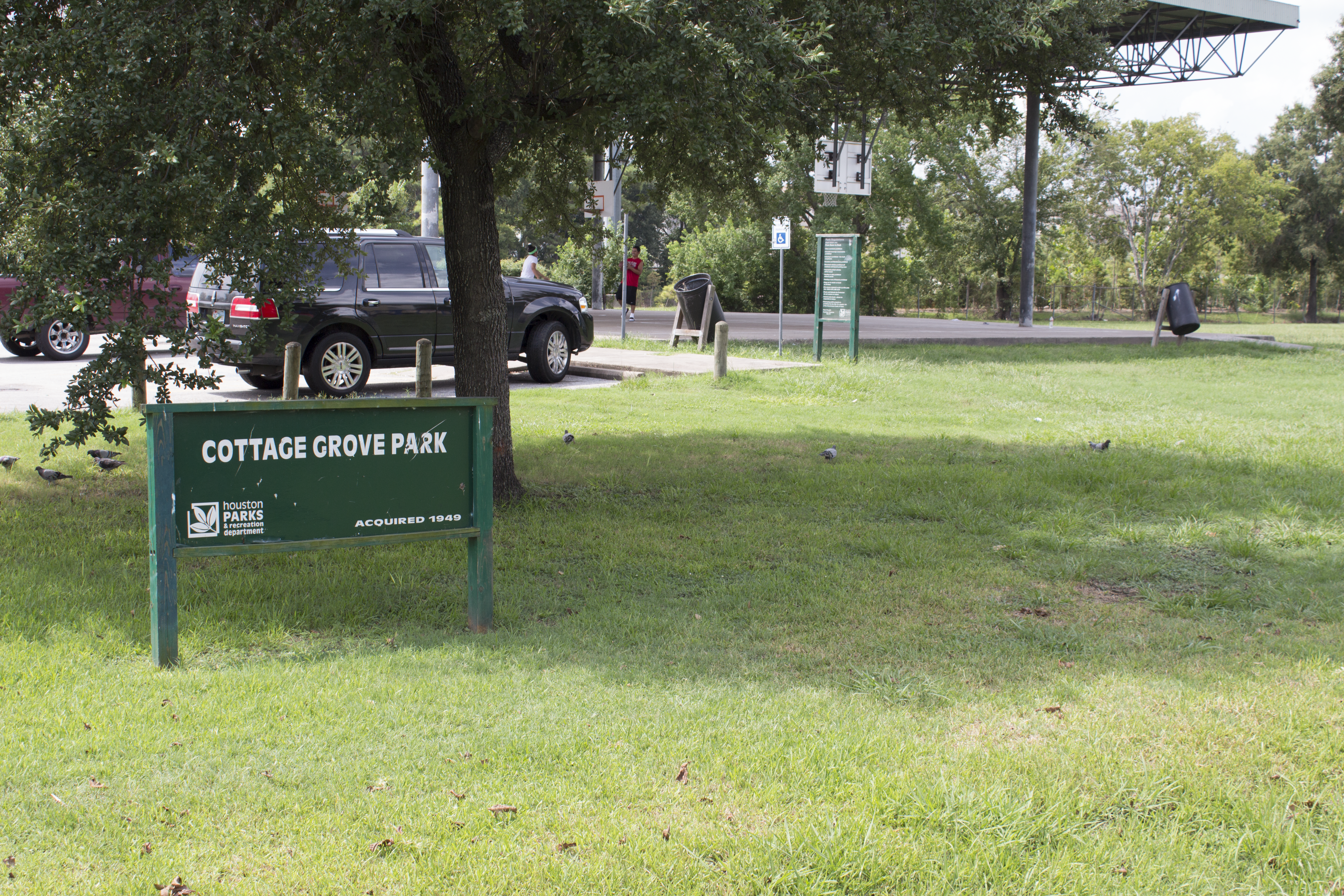
Cottage Grove Park

Cottage Grove Park is in Cottage Grove. It has a full covered basketball court, a 60-foot (18 m) baseball field, a playground, and paved parking. On September 1, 2010 the Houston City Council voted to approve a Chapter 380 agreement, a program authorized by the State of Texas to allow a municipal government to give house developers an incentive to increase economic development. As a result, a developer has planned to build a hike and bike trail along a railroad spur. In addition, Cottage Grove residents had lobbied to extend an existing hike and bike trail from Shepherd Drive to Hempstead Road.
