= NLRB v. J. Weingarten, Inc. =

- Supreme Court of the United States

Argued November 18, 1974 Decided February 19, 1975
- Full case name: National Labor Relations Board v. J. Weingarten, Inc.
- Citations: 420 U.S. 251 (more) 95 S. Ct. 959; 43 L. Ed. 2d 171; 1975 U.S. LEXIS 136

Case history
- Prior: NLRB found employer had engaged in unfair employment practice under National Labor Relations Act, 202 N.L.R.B. 446 (1973), decision reversed based on impermissible construction of statute, 485 F.2d 1135 (5th Cir. 1973)
- Subsequent: Judgment reversed and remanded with direction to enter judgment enforcing NLRB's order.

Holding
- In unionized workplaces, employees have the right under the National Labor Relations Act to the presence of a union steward during any management inquiry that the employee reasonably believes may result in discipline.

Court membership
- Chief Justice Warren E. Burger Associate Justices William O. Douglas · William J. Brennan Jr. Potter Stewart · Byron White; Thurgood Marshall · Harry Blackmun; Lewis F. Powell Jr. · William Rehnquist

Case opinions
- Majority: Brennan, joined by Douglas, White, Marshall, Blackmun, Rehnquist
- Dissent: Burger
- Dissent: Powell, joined by Stewart

Laws applied
- 29 U.S.C. § 157 (Section 7 of the National Labor Relations Act)

NLRB v. J. Weingarten, Inc., 420 U.S. 251 (1975), is a United States labor law case decided by the Supreme Court of the United States. It held that employees in unionized workplaces have the right under the National Labor Relations Act to the presence of a union steward during any management inquiry that the employee reasonably believes may result in discipline.

== Facts ==
In 1972, J. Weingarten, Inc. (Weingarten) operated a chain of food outlets. Weingarten operated two types of food establishments: stores with lunch counters and lobby food operations. Weingarten's purported policy was to allow employees at stores with lunch counters a free lunch, but employees at lobby food operations were not allowed a free lunch; this distinction (and what the actual policy was) would figure in the controversy to follow.

Beginning in 1961, Leura Collins was employed as a sales person at Store No. 2, which was a store with a lunch counter. Then in 1970, she was transferred to Store No. 98, which was a lobby food operation, where she again worked as a sales person. As a Weingarten sales person, Collins was represented under a collective bargaining agreement by Local Union No 455 of the Retail Clerks Union, which later became part of United Food and Commercial Workers. After a report that Collins was taking money from the cash register, an internal Weingarten investigator spent two days in June 1972 observing the store without the knowledge of Store No. 98's manager. After completing the surveillance, the investigator informed the store manager of his presence and reported that he could find nothing wrong. The store manager then told the investigator that one coworker had reported that Collins failed to pay full price for a box of chicken she had purchased.

The manager and investigator summoned Collins for an interview and questioned her. Collins asked for the presence of a union representative several times but was refused by the manager each time. Upon questioning, Collins explained that she had put four pieces of chicken (which cost $1 total) into a larger box (one which could hold $2.98 of chicken) because the store had run out of the four-piece sized boxes. To check Collins's story, the investigator left to ask the coworker who had reported her. The coworker confirmed that the store had run out of $1 size boxes and admitted she did not know how much chicken Collins had placed in the larger box. The investigator returned to the interview, apologized to Collins, and prepared to let her go.

Collins then burst into tears and exclaimed that the only thing she had ever gotten from the store without paying was her free lunch. This prompted renewed questioning from the investigator and manager because of the differing policies regarding free lunches at lobby food operations (not allowed) versus stores with lunch counters (allowed). Collins again requested and was refused the presence of a union representative. Based on the questioning, the investigator prepared a statement that Collins owed $160 for lunches but she refused to sign the statement. It was later found that most (if not all) of the employees at Store No. 98 (including the manager) took free lunches because they had never been informed of the policy prohibiting it. When the investigator contacted company headquarters during the interview, the company itself was uncertain whether the policy against free lunches was even in effect at that store.

As a result, the investigator terminated the questioning and the store manager asked Collins to keep the inquiry private. However, Collins reported the interview to her shop steward and other union representatives. As a result, an unfair labor practice proceeding was brought before the National Labor Relations Board (NLRB).

== Judgment ==
=== National Labor Relations Board ===
The NLRB applied a right it had recently announced in Quality Mfg. Co. and then clarified in Mobil Oil Corp. that employees in unionized workplaces had a right under Section 7 of the National Labor Relations Act (NLRA) to the presence of a union representative during any inquiry where the employee's job might be in jeopardy. The NLRB had explained in those decisions that having a union representative present was an exercise of the right to the 'mutual aid and protection' protected by Section 7. Therefore, an employer's refusal of such presence was an unfair labor practice and actionable under the NLRA. As a result, the NLRB found that Weingarten had engaged in an unfair labor practice by refusing Collins a representative and Weingarten appealed to the United States Court of Appeals for the Fifth Circuit.

=== Fifth Circuit ===
The Fifth Circuit held that this interpretation of Section 7 was impermissible and refused to enforce the NLRB order. The Fifth Circuit followed the lead of the Seventh and Fourth circuits which had refused to enforce the NLRB's previous decisions in Mobil Oil Corp. and Quality Mfg. Co. respectively. The Fifth Circuit argued that no union presence was necessary in Collins' questioning because the company was not attempting to bargain with her in any way. Additionally, the court argued that requiring a union representative any time the threat of discipline was present would extend the scope of the NLRA far too broadly. The NLRB appealed to the Supreme Court of the United States, which granted certiorari to hear the case.

=== US Supreme Court ===
The Supreme Court, reversing the Fifth Circuit, held that the NLRB decision was appropriate because its interpretation of the NLRA was permissible. The Court explained that the NLRB is entrusted with the responsibility to adapt the NLRA to changing times and that as a result courts reviewing its decisions only have the authority to reject its interpretations of the NLRA if those decisions are impermissible under it. This also led to the Court's observation that the NLRB can change its interpretation of the NLRA over time and is not required to comply with its earlier decisions.

The Court held that in this case the NLRB's interpretation of Section 7 was permissible because union representation at employer inquiries constitutes "concerted activity for mutual aid or protection" under the statute. While a particular inquiry might only have implications for one worker, each employee has an interest in the outcome as it establishes rules they will have to follow in the future. The Court further pointed out that having a representative present will help the employee who may be too "fearful or inarticulate" to accurately participate in the investigation as well as the employer by eliciting facts and helping find other sources for the investigation. The Court also pointed out that requiring a union representative at inquiries was consistent with actual labor practice as something already found in many workplaces. As a result, the Court reversed and remanded directing the Fifth Circuit to enter a judgment enforcing the NLRB order. Justice Brennan said the following.

The Board's construction plainly effectuates the most fundamental purposes of the Act. In § 1, 29 U.S.C. § 151, the Act declares that it is a goal of national labor policy to protect

the exercise by workers of full freedom of association, self-organization, and designation of representatives of their own choosing, for the purpose of ... mutual aid or protection.

To that end, the Act is designed to eliminate the "inequality of bargaining power between employees ... and employers." Ibid. Requiring a lone employee to attend an investigatory interview which he reasonably believes may result in the imposition of discipline perpetuates the inequality the Act was designed to eliminate, and bars recourse to the safeguards the Act provided "to redress the perceived imbalance of economic power between labor and management." American Ship Building Co. v. NLRB, 380 U. S. 300, 380 U. S. 316 (196). Viewed in this light, the Board's recognition that § 7 guarantees an employee's right to the presence of a union representative at an investigatory interview in which the risk of discipline reasonably inheres is within the protective ambit of the section "read in the light of the mischief to be corrected and the end to be attained.'" NLRB v. Hearst Publications, Inc., 322 U. S. 111, 322 U. S. 124 (1944).

The Board's construction also gives recognition to the right when it is most useful to both employee and employer. A single employee confronted by an employer investigating whether certain conduct deserves discipline may be too fearful or inarticulate to relate accurately the incident being investigated, or too ignorant to raise extenuating factors. A knowledgeable union representative could assist the employer by eliciting favorable facts, and save the employer production time by getting to the bottom of the incident occasioning the interview. Certainly his presence need not transform the interview into an adversary contest. Respondent suggests nonetheless that union representation at this stage is unnecessary, because a decision as to employee culpability or disciplinary action can be corrected after the decision to impose discipline has become final. In other words, respondent would defer representation until the filing of a formal grievance challenging the employer's determination of guilt after the employee has been discharged or otherwise disciplined. [Footnote 8] At that point, however, it becomes increasingly difficult for the employee to vindicate himself, and the value of representation is correspondingly diminished. The employer may then be more concerned with justifying his actions than reexamining them.

Chief Justice Burger dissented arguing that the NLRB had not adequately explained and justified its decision to impose the union representative presence requirement. He argued that the Court was not required to accept the NLRB decision because it was not adequately explained. Justice Burger stated that he would remand the case to the NLRB for a fuller explanation of its decision.

Justice Powell argued that the NLRB's interpretation of Section 7 was impermissible because having a union representative present during an investigation is a matter left by the NLRA to the bargaining process. He argued that the NLRA only creates the framework in which employers and unions bargain for employment benefits and does not cover specific benefits like the right to have a union representative present. He further explained that Section 7 only "protects those rights that are essential to employee self-organization" which did not include the right at issue in the case. As a result, he would have affirmed the Fifth Circuit because the right to the presence of a union representative was not covered by Section 7.

Justice Powell also prophetically noted that the rationales relied upon by the majority and the NLRB were applicable not only to unionized workplaces, but also to situations where there is no union.

== Significance ==
The decision that employees have a right to union representation at investigatory interviews led to what has become known as the Weingarten rights.

During an investigatory interview, the Supreme Court ruled that the following rules apply:

Rule 1
The employee must make a clear request for union representation before or during the interview. The employee cannot be punished for making this request.
Rule 2
After the employee makes the request, the employer must choose from among three options:

- Grant the request and delay questioning until the union representative arrives and (prior to the interview continuing) the representative has a chance to consult privately with the employee;
- Deny the request and end the interview immediately; or
- Give the employee a clear choice between having the interview without representation, or ending the interview.

Rule 3
If the employer denies the request for union representation, and continues to ask questions, it commits an unfair labor practice and the employee has a right to refuse to answer. The employer may not discipline the employee for such a refusal.

Since Weingarten was decided, the NLRB has extended and retracted its protections several times. While the right announced in the case has never been removed, the NLRB has changed its mind several times as to whether or not the right to have a representative present during investigations applies to non-union workplaces. In 1982 in the case of Materials Research Corp., the NLRB extended the right to workplaces that did not have unions. The NLRB reasoned that the right was derived from Section 7 of the NLRA rather than Section 9. While Section 9 covers the exclusive rights of unions to act in the collective bargaining process and are thus only available in unionized workplaces, Section 7 rights are available to employees without a union and thus do not vary based on whether the workplace is unionized. The NLRB further explained that the right to have another employee present during interviews that might lead to discipline helped to reduce the inequality between employees and management as intended by the NLRA. This would also be true regardless of whether a workplace was unionized.

However, the NLRB removed this right from non-unionized workplaces only three years later in the 1985 of Sears, Roebuck & Co. In that case, the NLRB explained that the right to a union representative during inquiries that could lead to discipline was appropriate because a union protects the rights of all workers by safeguarding the terms and conditions for each individual worker. However, when there is no union present the right is inappropriate because employers have the authority to deal with employees on an individual basis and the right to the presence of another employee interferes with that. The NLRB further explained that a representative protects the interests not just of the individual employee, but of the entire collective bargaining unit. As a result, giving employees in non-unionized workplaces is like requiring the employer to deal with the equivalent of a union representative which is not intended by the NLRA. As a result, employees who are not represented by unions do not have the right to a representative during inquiries.

In July 2000, the NLRB under the Clinton administration extended the Weingarten rights to employees at nonunionized workplaces. On June 15, 2004, the NLRB under the George W. Bush administration effectively reversed the previous ruling by a three to two vote.

In the 2001 case of Epilepsy Found. of Ne. Ohio, the NLRB again extended the right to non-unionized workplaces, and this decision was affirmed by the United States Court of Appeals for the District of Columbia Circuit. Then, the NLRB again withdrew the right in the 2004 case of IBM Corp. The NLRB noted that either interpretation of the NLRA, extending the right to representation during investigations that may lead to discipline or not doing so, was permissible. Therefore, whether or not to extend the right is purely a policy decision for the NLRB to make. After considering the policy issues on both sides, the NLRB decided that the "employer's right to conduct prompt, efficient, thorough, and confidential workplace investigations" outweighed the employee's right to representation during those investigations and withdrew the right from workplaces without unions.

As of 2007, workers who are not union members do not have the right to the presence of a representative during management inquiries. However, since the NLRB has changed its decision on this issue over time, it is unclear whether that will be true in the future.

== See also ==
- US labor law
- Weingarten Rights
- List of United States Supreme Court cases, volume 420
