= Fiesta Mart =

Latino-American supermarket chain based in Houston, Texas and established in 1972

- Type: Private
- Industry: Retail
- Founded: 1972 (54 years ago) in Houston, Texas, United States
- Headquarters: Houston, Texas, United States
- Products: Bakery, beer, dairy, delicatessen, frozen foods, gasoline, general merchandise, meat, pharmacy, produce, seafood, wine
- Owner: Grupo Comercial Chedraui, S.A.B. de C.V.
- Website: fiestamart.com

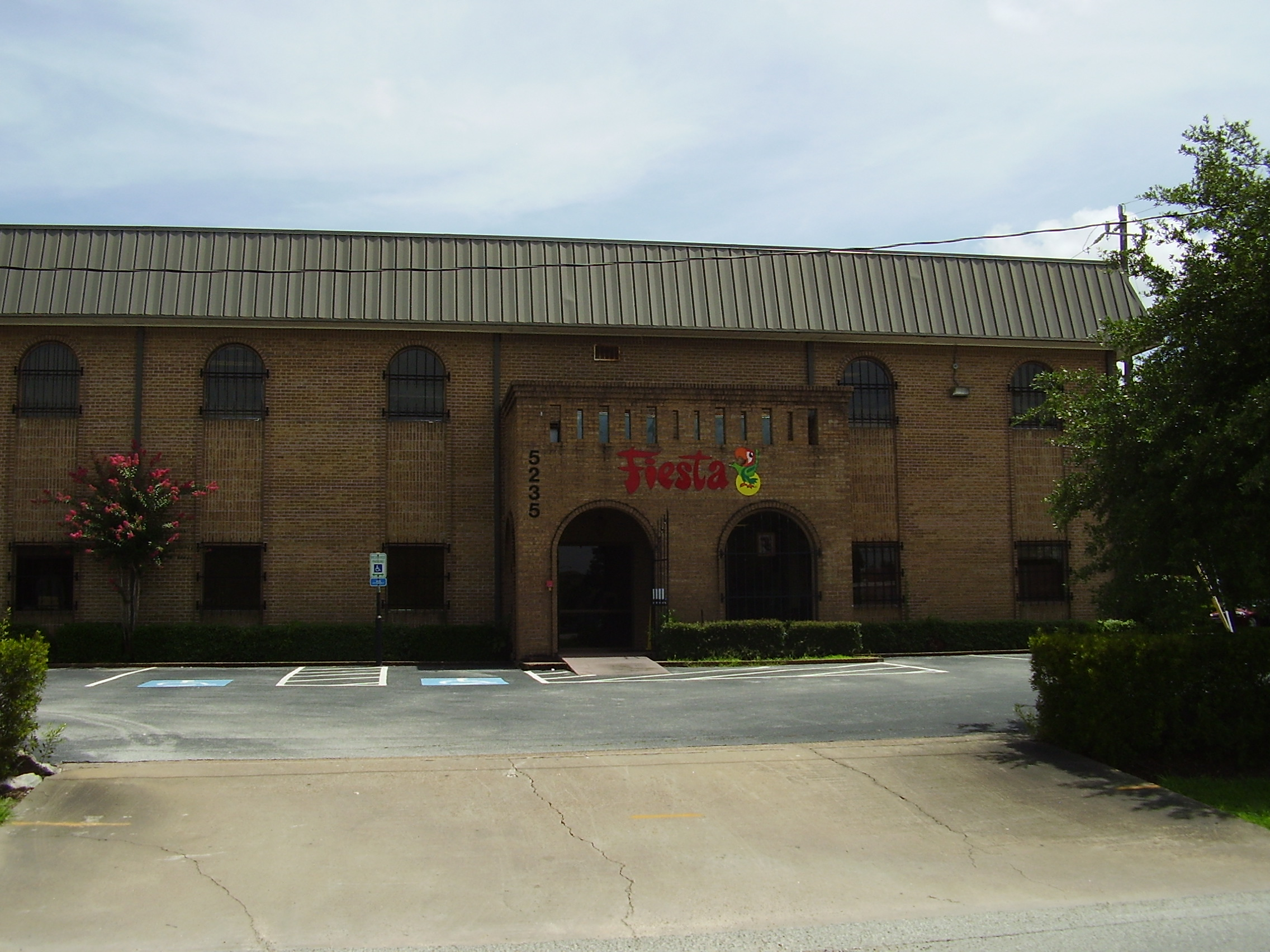
Former Fiesta Mart headquarters

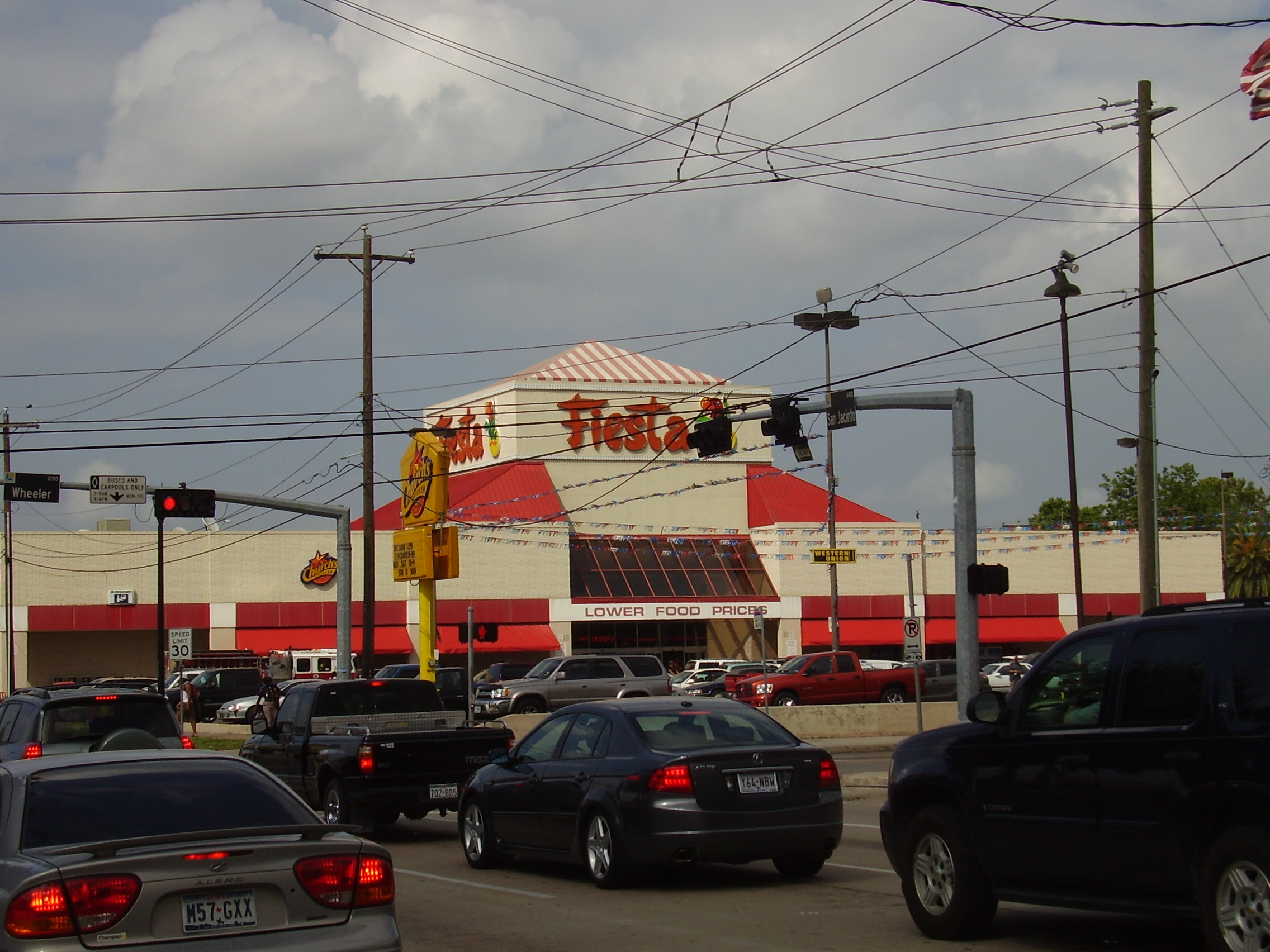
Former Fiesta Mart location in Midtown, Houston, Texas, United States, which closed in July 2020

Fiesta Mart, L.L.C., formerly Fiesta Mart Inc., is a Latino-American supermarket chain based in Houston, Texas. Established in 1972, the company specializes in serving Hispanic and other minority neighborhoods. As of 2004, the chain operated 34 supermarkets in Greater Houston and 16 supermarkets elsewhere in Texas, along with 17 Beverage Mart liquor stores. During that period, Fiesta Mart held a 7.5% share of the grocery market in Greater Houston. The chain's mascot is a cartoon parrot.

Fiest Mart is recognized for its selection of Hispanic groceries and prepared hot meals. Allison Wollam of the Houston Business Journal noted that, "The company has been successful at targeting the Hispanic market and specifically catering to their needs and shopping styles." In 2006, a company spokesperson reported that Hispanic customers accounted for up to 70% of stores in certain locations.

The chain provides international foods and ingredients which are typically not available at American grocery stores. Furthermore, Fiesta Mart locations often include independent store-within-stores, such as discount jewelry and banking services. The company also operates Fiesta Liquor Stores, which specializes in the sale of alcohol.

== History ==
In 1972, Donald Bonham and O.C. Mendenhall started Fiesta; neither were ethnically Hispanic. Bonham farmed in Belize and Guatemala and supervised the creation of a Chilean supermarket chain. Upon return to Texas, Bonham believed Houston-area businesses did not adequately cater to Mexican Americans, a large proportion of the city's population. He opened the first Fiesta, catering exclusively to Hispanic Americans, in the Near Northside.

By the late 1970s, Fiesta broadened its product range in response to changes in the demographics of Houston, introducing African, Indian, Korean, Filipino, and Vietnamese items. By the mid-1980s, Fiesta had 15 stores. By 1989, Fiesta had $420 million in annual sales, including $25 million in clothing sales. As the chain developed, its clientele expanded, including second and third-generation Hispanics.

During the late 1980s and early 1990s, Fiesta operated a very large supermarket—an early version of modern supercenters, such as Walmart Supercenter and SuperTarget. This store targeted the surrounding, more affluent, Houston suburbs. It featured a large, sloped hydroponic garden along the north wall. The floor space was sold off in portions in the 1990s. As of 2011, the location is called the NASA Value Center Shopping Center and has no Fiesta presence.

In 1994, Fiesta acquired four locations sold by Appletree Markets. In 1998, Fiesta made a marketing agreement with Conoco Inc. allowing their gas stations at Fiesta supermarkets. In 1999, Fiesta had a 10.9% share of Houston's grocery market.

In 2003, the Houston Press ranked Fiesta as the "Best Grocery Store" in Houston.

In 2004, Fiesta was acquired by Grocers Supply, a family-owned Houston-based wholesale groceries distributor. On July 23, 2008, Fiesta Mart acquired eleven Carnival Brand stores from Minyard Food Stores. In 2015, the Levit family, owners of Grocers Supply, sold Fiesta to Acon Investments, a company based in Washington, DC. Bodega Latina, and its Mexican parent company Chedraui, acquired Fiesta Mart from Acon in April 2018.

== Headquarters and locations ==
The current headquarters is on Wirt Road, on the property of Store #8 in Spring Branch, Houston. Previously, the headquarters was in the Cottage Grove area of Houston for many years.

The property was sold, and the office was later in the Capital One building on Westheimer Road near the Galleria; it moved there in 2018.

=== Locations ===
- Greater Austin
  - Austin (2 locations)
- Dallas/Fort Worth Metroplex
  - Arlington
  - Carrollton
  - Dallas (11 Fiesta locations, 1 Carnival location)
  - Fort Worth (7 Fiesta locations, 1 Carnival location)
  - Garland (2 locations)
  - Irving (2 locations)
  - Plano
- Greater Houston
  - Conroe
  - Unincorporated Harris County (3 locations)
  - Houston (27 locations)
  - Missouri City
  - Rosenberg
  - South Houston

== Former stores ==
A Fiesta Mart store was in Beaumont, Texas from 1994 to 1995. The location has been replaced with the Conn's, Inc. headquarters, a chain of electronics and appliances stores. From 1999 to 2008, there was a location in Grand Prairie, Texas. A Sugar Creek Fiesta Market Place store opened in Sugar Land, Texas, taking the place of a former Gerland's location in July 2013. The store had the first Caribou Coffee outlet in Texas, a Market Place Eatery restaurant and a Red Mango yogurt shop. Fiesta announced the store would close on April 20, 2014.

There were multiple Houston locations which have shut down. A Fiesta Mart in Spring Branch, Houston has been replaced by a 99 Ranch Market Due to damages from Hurricane Harvey in 2017, a store in North Shore, Houston closed. In 2021, the store was said to reopen at an undetermined point in the future, but a timeline was not provided. Declining performance and expiration of a lease led to a store in Midtown Houston closing in 2020. A store in Montrose, Houston, established in 1994, shut down in 2012 and the site is intended to become an apartment complex.
