= Lewis Food Town =

American grocery store chain

- Type: Private
- Industry: Retail
- Founded: 1994
- Founder: Ross Lewis
- Headquarters: South Houston, Texas
- Number of locations: 29
- Products: Beer, dairy, delicatessen, frozen foods, general merchandise, meat, pharmacy, produce, seafood, wine, poultry, cereal, pasta, bottled water, canned soup, cigarettes, magazines, bread, cheese, orange juice.

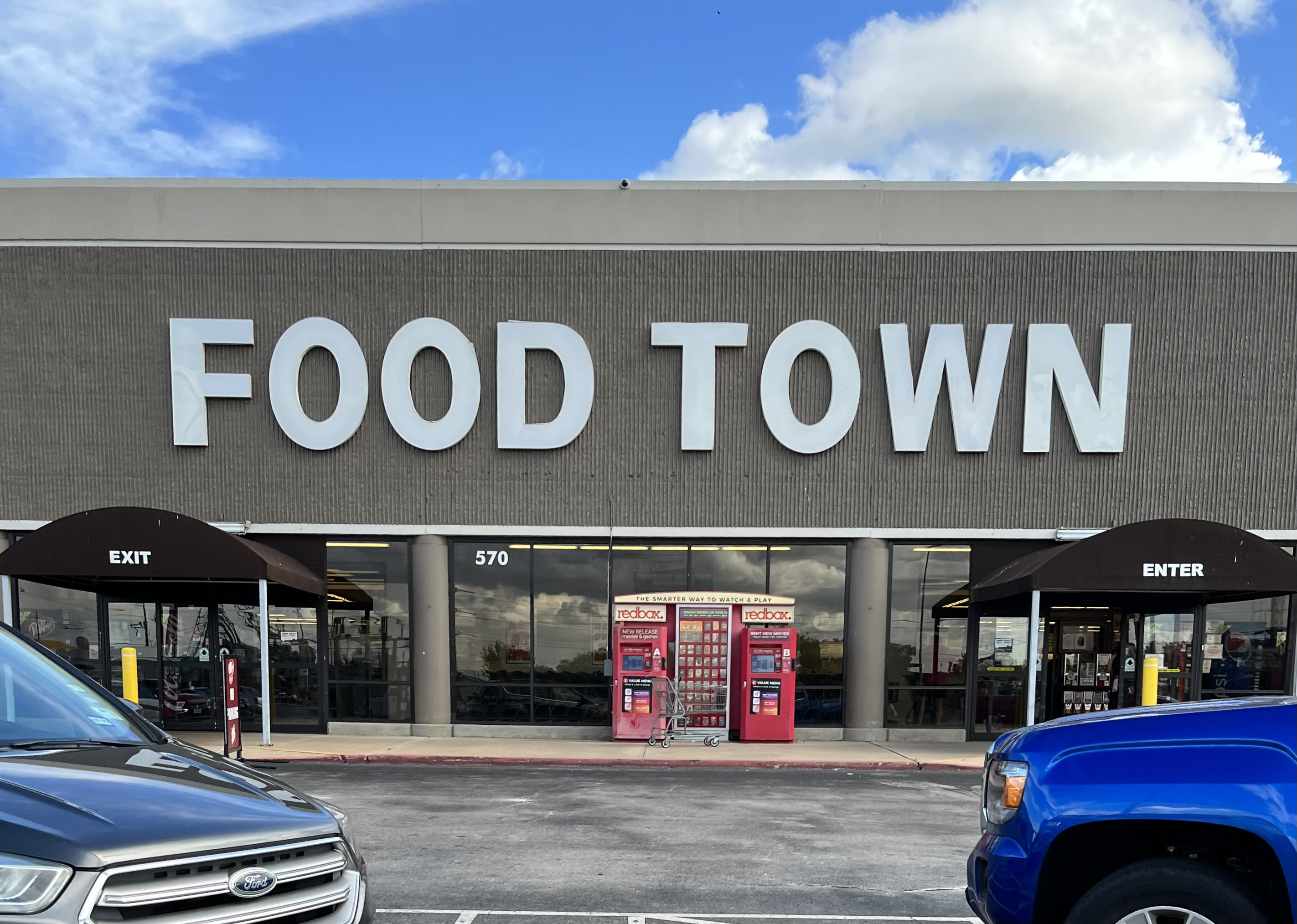
Food Town store in Webster, Texas.

Lewis Food Town, Inc., which does business as Food Town, is an independent grocery chain with 29 stores throughout Greater Houston. The chain got its start with founder Ross Lewis and six associates in late 1993, but officially launched on April 28, 1994, with the opening of its first store in Pasadena, Texas. Although the company’s founder died in December 2020, younger generations continued the family business. Food Town was named among the honorees for the Houston Business Journal’s inaugural Family-Owned Business Awards in 2023. Today, its footprint extends throughout the Houston metro region, from Spring down to Webster, and from Sugar Land to Baytown.

== Company Growth ==
Food Town took a swift approach to growth from the start. The chain’s first store, in Pasadena, launched in April 1994, while two additional locations opened their doors the following month. The company grew to 24 stores in fewer than 10 years, moving into stores such as former Albertson’s operations and Houston’s Auchan hypermarket. In April 2015, Food Town acquired Houston’s Gerland’s grocery chain. Although 10 of the Gerland’s stores already boasted the Food Town name due to franchise agreements, the purchase added another six stores to Food Town’s roster. The Gerland Corporation stores brought Food Town to 32 locations total, two of which the company later closed.

While each opening placed Food Town in a different part of the Houston metroplex, it didn’t result in new construction. Instead of building from the ground up, the chain opted to move into spaces vacated by outgoing stores. The approach is an investment in the community, company President Mike Lewis has said, and serves to improve the neighborhoods the chain moves into.

== Community Involvement ==
Food Town regularly gives back to Houston residents and the charities that support them. The grocery chain’s annual Making Strides Against Breast Cancer efforts, for instance, invite customers and team members to donate to the American Cancer Society either online or at the cash register — and to take part in walks, as well. Food Town’s 2022 efforts brought in $50,000 in support of breast cancer research and awareness. In previous years, the company also regularly hosted the Food Town Golf Tournament benefiting Special Olympics Texas, and has taken part in the American Cancer Society’s Relay for Life. In 2021 Food Town joined with Houston’s KHOU news station for the Turn the Page literacy initiative, bringing in more than 45,000 books for Houston area families.

In addition, for more than a decade Food Town has joined with vendors to provide Thanksgiving meals to needy families throughout Houston. With help from lists provided by area churches and school districts, 250 to 300 families receive boxes of shelf-stable dry grocery goods, meat and cheese products for holiday meals.

== Little-Known Facts ==
Through the years, some of Houston’s Food Town grocery stores have found their place in historic moments and pop culture. In 1989, Russia’s soon-to-be-President Boris Yeltsin stopped by a former Randalls in Webster, Texas, (today, Food Town’s El Dorado location) for a firsthand look at an American grocery store. In 2020, Houston’s Opera in the Heights created a comic opera surrounding the historic visit. Food Town’s Wilcrest Drive location also made a small-screen debut when it served as a filming location for the first episode of comedian Mohammed Amer’s Netflix series, “Mo”.
