= AppleTree Markets =

Defunct supermarket chain in Texas, US

AppleTree Markets was a supermarket chain in Texas formed in 1969 when Safeway opened its first stores in Houston, which were spun off under the AppleTree name in 1988. The division once had 100 stores in Greater Houston and Greater Austin. By January 21, 2002, AppleTree had reduced its holdings to two stores in Bryan, Texas, where it had shifted its headquarters. One of the remaining locations was sold in 2009 and the final location, in Bryan at Highway 21 and Texas Avenue, closed in early 2012, marking the end of the chain.

== History ==
=== Safeway ===
Safeway put its 18-year-old Houston division up for sale in 1988 in an effort to raise money to pay off debts from a $4 billion leveraged buyout in 1986. On June 14, 1988, Safeway agreed to sell its Houston division to Texas Supermarkets Inc., a holding company formed by local investors Duncan Cook & Co. and the Sterling Group. The deal included 50 stores in Houston, 20 in Austin, stores in 23 other communities in East and Central Texas, along with a distribution center, frozen food warehouse, bread manufacturing plant and milk processing plant. At the time of the $174 million (~$244 million in 2024) transaction, Safeway's 18 percent market share ranked third in the Houston market behind Kroger, with 27 percent, and Randall's Food Markets, with 21 percent. M. Dean Gantt, the former Houston division manager, assumed the position of president and chief executive officer of Texas Supermarkets Inc., which initially owned only eight of the stores from the transaction and leased the rest from Safeway. Texas Supermarkets was allowed to operate under the Safeway banner until June 28, 1989, but it would continue to do so until a new name began appearing in July 1989—AppleTree Markets. Five stores were renamed Budget Stores, stores with slightly lower prices on some items and fewer specialty shops such as delis, bakeries, and floral shops. The last of the Safeway banners was replaced in September 1989.

Gantt retired abruptly in October 1989 and was replaced a month later by Arthur L. Patch, senior vice president of Dublin, California-based Lucky Stores Inc.

=== Bankruptcy ===
The company struggled with the debt that originated from the 1988 leveraged buyout out Safeway's stores. After failed attempts to restructure that debt, AppleTree sought Chapter 11 bankruptcy protection in 1992. Soon after the filing, AppleTree announced its plans to begin closing stores. Arthur Patch resigned his post in March 1992, and the chairman of the company's board, Fred R. Lummis, took the helm. Also a growing problem was the chain's aging store base. The bulk of Safeway units in Houston dated from the late 1960s and early 1970s, and a logo change in 1981-1982 was the only alteration, if any, to most of such stores before the AppleTree split. Many former Weingarten's stores, which had been acquired by Safeway in 1983, were even older. A very small minority of Houston Safeways were built in 1986, but these were larger and had a more modern, conventional prototype.

To cut costs and raise cash, AppleTree continued to close stores or sell its stores to competitors such as Fiesta Mart, Gerland's Food Fair, and Market Basket. The company would also look to move its headquarters to a smaller facility, as well as close its distribution warehouse. AppleTree formerly had its headquarters in the Spring Branch area and in Houston.

In its reorganization plan, AppleTree announced plans to close or sell 33 additional stores. Ultimately, AppleTree announced in November 1993 it would sell its remaining 49 stores to competitors. Randall's Food Markets acquired eleven locations in Greater Austin and three in Greater Houston. Eleven stores were sold to Kroger, five stores to Gerland's, four to Fiesta Mart, three stores to Rice Food Markets, and one store each to Cox's Foodarama, Big Chief Super Markets, Stanley Stores, and Super Warehouse Foods. Some of the former Safeway stores Randall's purchased from AppleTree became part of Safeway once again when Safeway bought Randall's in 1999. One location at 8620 Stella Link became a Sellers Bros.

As a result of the reduction of stores, AppleTree's northwest Houston grocery distribution facility, which included a 119,000-square-foot (11,100 m^{2}) refrigerated warehouse, a large bakery and a major milk plant, was larger than AppleTree's needs. The facility was still owned by Safeway, and it was sold to H-E-B. As a result, AppleTree would buy its dairy products from a supplier and also relocated its headquarters to a building in northwest Houston.

=== Independent chain and closing ===
With the sales, AppleTree would be reduced to six stores; three in Bryan-College Station, two in Houston, and one in Huntsville. AppleTree chief executive Tony Kubicek purchased the last six AppleTree stores and planned to operate the stores as an independent, Houston-based chain bearing the AppleTree name.

However, the chain did not fare well – after closing the lone Huntsville store and one of the two Houston locations, in 1997 AppleTree closed its other Houston location. With the closing, AppleTree operated three stores in Bryan-College Station, where it would eventually relocate its corporate staff.

AppleTree further retrenched to its two Bryan locations after closing its College Station store in 2002. In February 2009, AppleTree sold its Briarcrest Drive store in Bryan to local resident Jim Lewis. Lewis used the location to open a new grocery store, Village Foods and rehired all of the AppleTree employees who'd been left unemployed by the closing. The final AppleTree location, in Bryan at Highway 21 and Texas Avenue, closed in early 2010.
