= Foodarama =

Supermarket chain in Texas, United States

Foodarama Markets Texas.
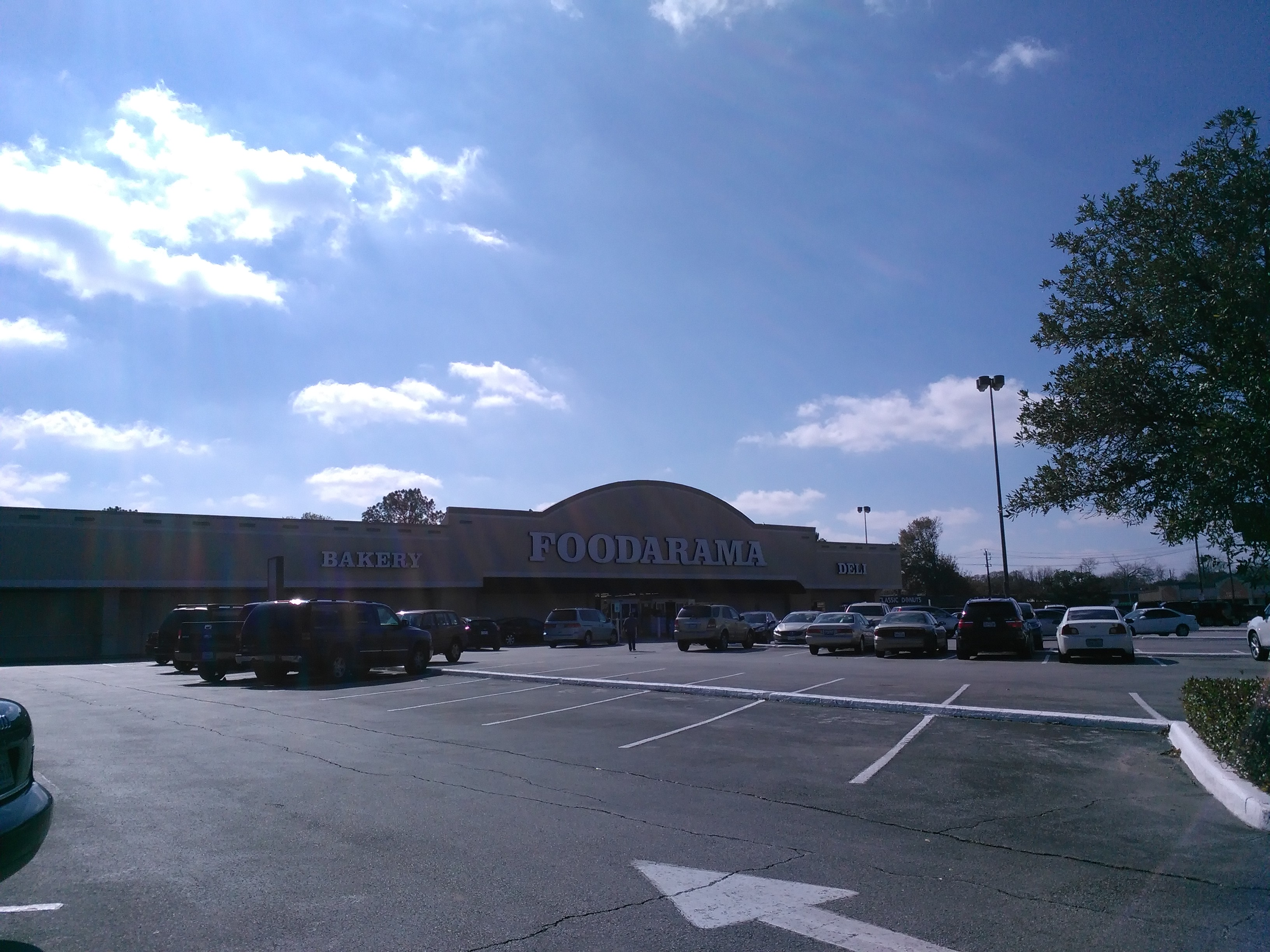
- Foodarama in the Maplewood Mall in Houston
- Trade name: Foodarama
- Founded: 1973; 52 years ago
- Founder: Carrol Cox
- Headquarters: Brays Oaks, Houston, Texas, United States
- Brands: La Fiesta
- Website: foodaramatexas.com

Foodarama, also known as Cox's Foodarama, is a supermarket chain in Texas, with its headquarters in Foodarama Store #1 in Brays Oaks, Houston. In Greater Houston, as of 2016 Foodarama operated ten stores. Carrol Cox is the founder and president of Foodarama. As of 2011, 1,000 people worked for Foodarama. As of 2016, the Cox family were still the owners of the chain.

== History ==
The first Foodarama location was opened in 1973 by Carrol Cox. He had gained grocery-store managerial experience in Arizona and Utah before moving to Houston.

In 1993, after AppleTree Markets put many of its stores up for sale, Cox's Foodarama acquired one. Foodarama acquired the 1805 Ella Appletree, currently Foodarama #4. On February 28, 1999, Cox's Foodarama had seven locations. It had $74.4 million in annual sales and 1.4% of the grocery market. It also had 814 Houston-area employees. In the period between February 1999 and February 2000, Foodarama opened two locations and remodeled two locations. In 1999, Cox's Foodarama had 1.5% of the Houston grocery market. Foodarama occupied a Randall's location that was closed in 2006.

== La Fiesta ==
The Foodarama group also operates a chain of seven stores in Greater San Antonio, under the banner La Fiesta. La Fiesta is headquartered in La Fiesta Supermarket #10 in San Antonio.

In 2002, 80% of the chain's customer base was Hispanic. To cater to Hispanics, the chain devotes large portions of its stores to meat and fresh produce. Ronnie Catlett, the vice president of Foodarama and general manager of the San Antonio division, said that the stores were intended to cater to groceries. Elizabeth Allen of the San Antonio Express-News said that the company's niche was "modest but profitable".

In order to cope with small profit margins, La Fiesta tries to reduce its overhead as much as possible. It uses bulk buying, requires store managers to work on the shop floor instead of in offices, and, as of 2004, has low labor costs. As of 2004 most of its locations are in western San Antonio, serving Hispanic populations there. La Fiesta's designated wholesaler, Grocers Supply, has a buying coalition which allows its customers to get goods at lower prices. Individual locations are permitted to make pricing and scheduling decisions.

Prior to 1998 La Fiesta operated a 16,000-square-foot (1,500 m^{2}) location in Eagle Pass, Texas, a community along the Mexico–United States border. It was across the street from an H-E-B location that was, as of 1998, being remodeled. In addition the future of the Mexican peso as a currency was uncertain. Also the Government of Mexico enforced a $50 import limit upon Mexicans returning into Mexico, affecting La Fiesta's business among Mexican national shoppers. Because of the issues involving Mexico and competition from H-E-B, the Eagle Pass La Fiesta store was closed. As of 2004 it was the only location ever closed in the history of La Fiesta.

The chain's first store opened in 1981. In 2002 the chain had six locations. Starting in 2004 it laid plans to open two additional locations. As of 2004 the largest location was a 43,000-square-foot (4,000 m^{2}) former Handy Andy at Callaghan and Ingram, which includes a bakery and restaurant. The store had replaced a smaller location that was across the street.

After a La Fiesta manager fired a pregnant employee, the United States Equal Employment Opportunity Commission filed a lawsuit against Foodarama, saying that the termination was wrongful because the store did not accept a full medical release from a doctor that was intended to allow her to work without restrictions. Foodarama settled with the EEOC; it gave the employee $10,000 and posted notices saying that it is making a discrimination-free workplace.

La Fiesta markets were sold off to Poco Loco Supermercado of Austin, TX in early 2023.

== Headquarters ==
Foodarama's headquarters are in Foodarama Store #1 in Brays Oaks, Houston. In February 1989, Carrol Cox, the owner of that Foodarama location, opposed the plan of a Metropolitan Transit Authority of Harris County (METRO)-implemented grade separation at Willowbend and South Post Oak since he believed it would reduce the number of parking spaces at the store. On September 10, 1989, a woman was murdered in a robbery in the store parking lot.

== See also ==
- Earlier, the name "Fooarama" was the first side-by-side refrigerator-freezer appliances in the mid-1950s, manufactured by Kelvinator.
