= Sellers Bros. =

American retail chain

- Type: Private; family business
- Industry: Retail (Grocery)
- Founded: 1921
- Headquarters: Houston, TX
- Number of locations: 17
- Key people: Kirk Sellers (Chairman & CEO)
- Products: Beer, dairy, deli, frozen foods, general merchandise, meat, pharmacy, produce, seafood, wine.
- Owner: Sellers family (100%)
- Website: www.sellersbros.com

Sellers Bros. is a chain of grocery stores and convenience stores based in Houston, Texas, United States.

The company was formed in 1921, and its officers are George R. Sellers; Joseph L. Sellers; and John L. Sellers. Sellers Bros. operates 12 supermarkets/grocery stores and five convenience stores.

In the 1990s Sellers Bros. used direct mail as the method of marketing to customers. In 1997 Sellers Bros. hired an advertising firm to promote the chain to Hispanic people. In 1998, the chain had eight grocery stores and six convenience stores. Most of the locations were inside the 610 Loop. Ronnie Sellers, the president of the chain, said that it does not advertise as much as other area supermarket chains. Sellers added that the chain planned to expand its radio advertising in a manner proportionate to the expansion of the chain. When expanding, the chain typically buys existing properties. For example, it acquired an Appletree market which opened in January 1998. Laura Elder of the Houston Business Journal said that the opening had "little fanfare." Elder added that, at the time, executives from the company tended to be "low-key."

== Gallery ==
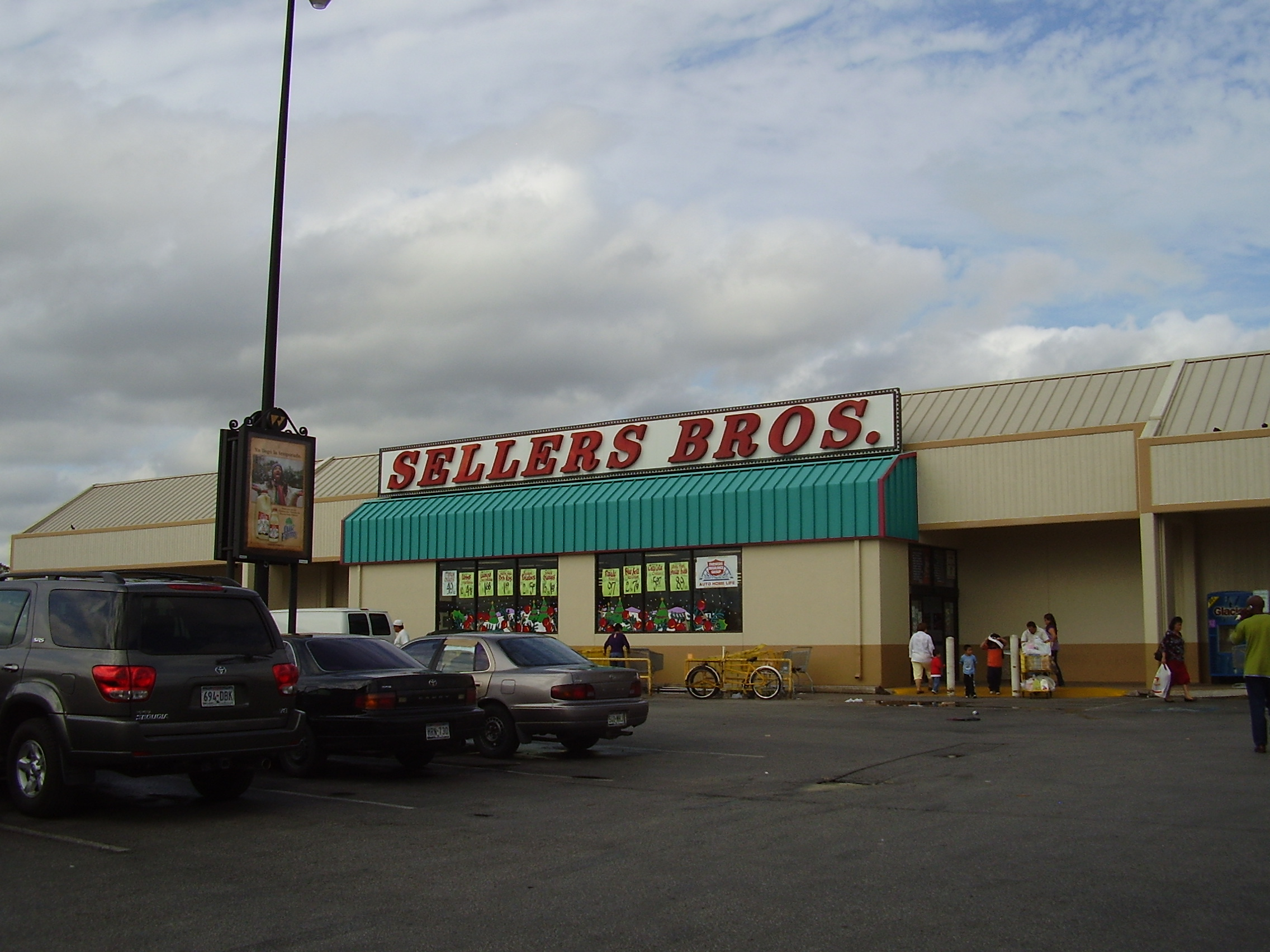
Sellers Bros. location in the Gulfton area of Houston

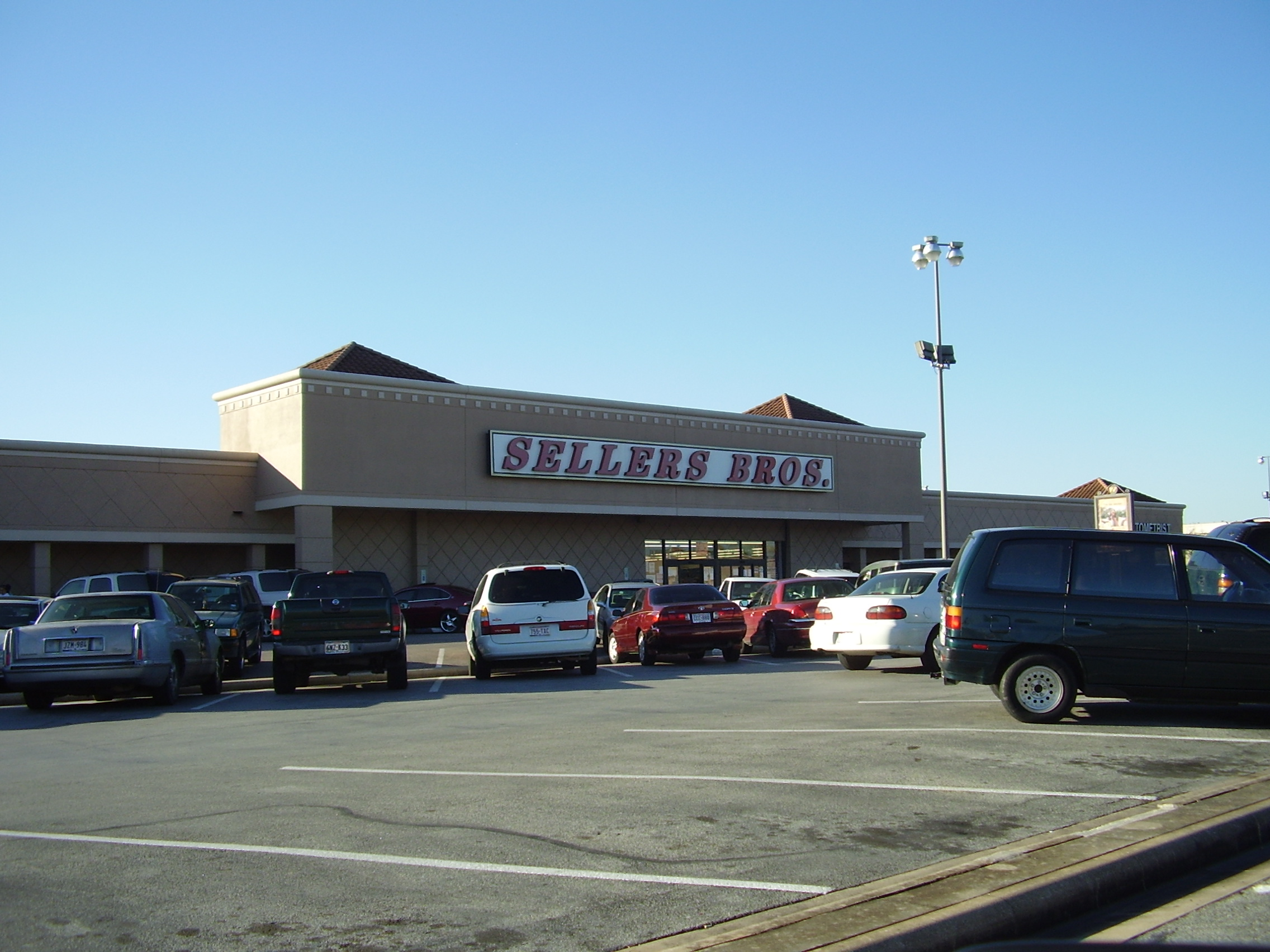
Sellers Bros. location along Stella Link Road

Original Sellers Bros. Logo
