= Weingarten's =

Former American supermarket chain

- Final logo, designed by Milton Glaser
- Founded: 1901; 125 years ago
- Founder: Joseph Weingarten
- Defunct: 1986; 40 years ago
- Fate: Sold to Safeway in 1983
- Headquarters: Houston, Texas, U.S.
- Number of locations: 70

Weingarten's was a supermarket chain in the Southern United States until it was acquired by Safeway in 1983. J. Weingarten, Inc. had its headquarters in what is now the East End in Houston, Texas.

== History ==
Hersch Harris Weingarten, a poor Jewish immigrant from Łańcut (what was then Austria-Hungary) and his son, Joseph, opened a grocery store in Downtown Houston in 1901. A second store opened in 1920. Advertising "Better Food for Less," Joseph Joe Weingarten pioneered self-service and cash-and-carry shopping. Weingarten's chain of stores in Texas, Arkansas, and Louisiana grew by 1926 to six; by 1938 the company had 12 stores; by 1951 there were 25 stores; and by 1967 the chain operated 70 stores.

To concentrate on real estate development for retail shopping centers, Weingarten Incorporated sold its stores, which had grown to a chain of 104 stores in five states, to Cavenham Foods, who transferred management to its chain Grand Union in 1980 for $12 (~$47.00 in 2025) a share. In 1980 Weingarten had 18% of the Houston area grocery market share. Grand Union then resold most of the stores to Safeway (Safeway, which later left the Houston market, acquired 43 of the stores), Randalls (purchased by Safeway when they reentered Houston, but at that time, an independent company), and Gerland's Food Fair in 1983, including 55 stores in the Houston area. However, lease provisions at several locations barred the automatic transfer of leases between operators. Because Weingarten's and Tanglewood Corporation could not agree on a disposition of the Post Oak Center lease, Weingarten's continued to operate the store at that location until the end of March 1986.

Weingarten Realty Investors was acquired by Kimco Realty in 2021.

== See also ==
- NLRB v. J. Weingarten, Inc.
