= Gerland Corporation =

American retail company

- Company type: Private
- Industry: Retail
- Founded: 1967 (59 years ago)
- Headquarters: Houston, Texas
- Products: Beer, dairy, delicatessen, frozen foods, general merchandise, meat, pharmacy, produce, seafood, wine.

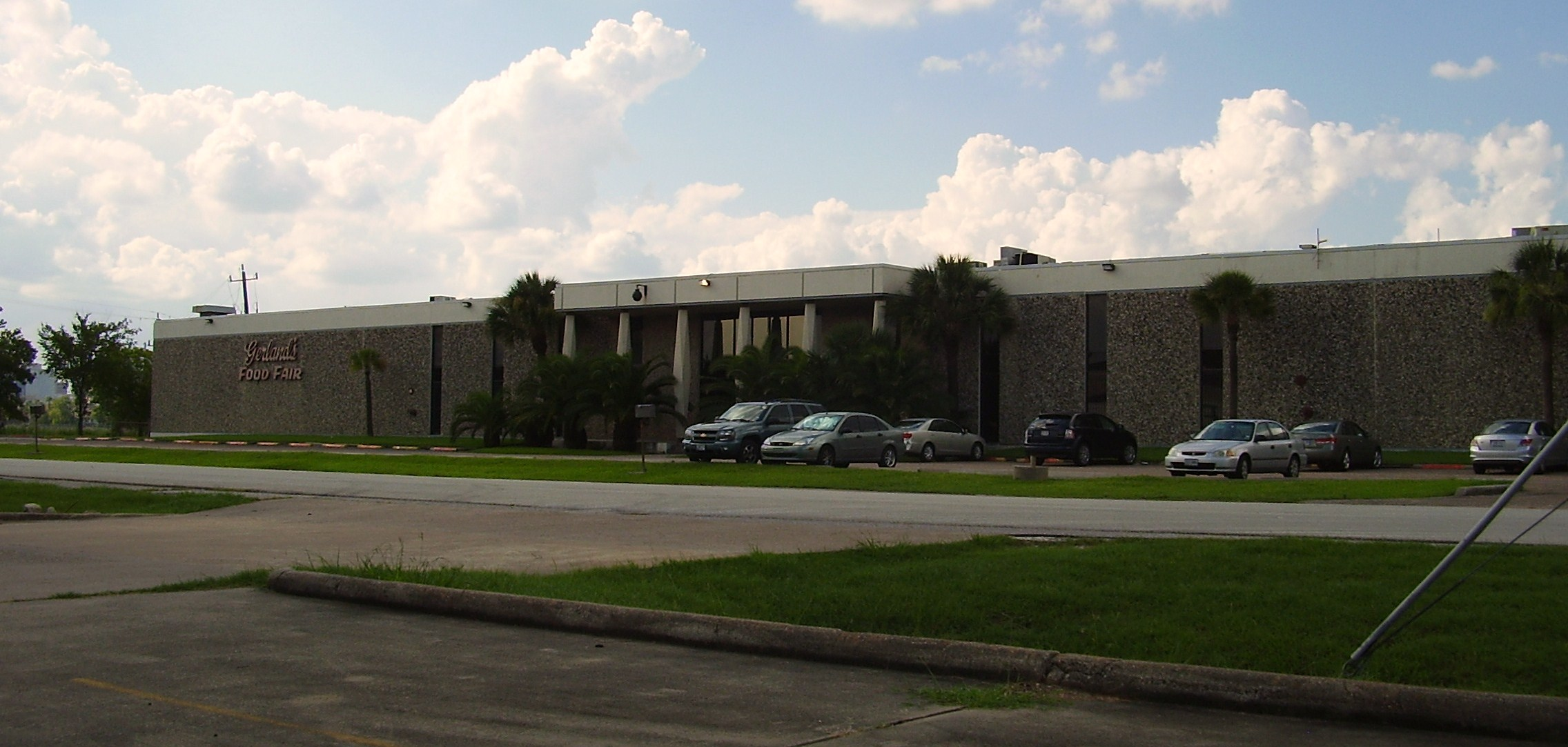
Gerland Corporation headquarters

Gerland Corporation was a retail company headquartered in Houston, Texas, United States; the company operates various grocery stores, gas stations, and check cashing stores within the Greater Houston Area.

== History ==
A. J. Gerland founded the Gerland's Food Fair chain in 1967. The first store was located in the Spring Branch area in northwest Houston.

Following the success of the Weingarten's and Randall's supermarket chains in Houston, Gerland's added bakery and delicatessen departments to its stores in the late 1970s. In recent decades both in-store pharmacies and gas stations were added at certain locations; however, the two gas stations that were in service have both been shut down and repaved.

In 1980 Gerland's had 6% of the Houston-area grocery market share, making it the fifth largest grocer there. Gerland's acquired several stores from the defunct Weingarten chain in 1981, and operated more than 40 store locations in the Houston area by 1990. While most were company-owned, a handful of the Gerland's stores were independently owned franchises. In 1994 Gerland acquired five stores from Appletree Markets. On February 28, 1999, Gerland's had 15 locations. It had an annual sales of $163.5 million. It had 3.1% of the Houston market, making it the sixth largest grocer in Houston. It had 1,650 Houston-area employees. Within the year until February 28, 1999, it remodeled one store. In July 1999 it had 3.2% of the area market share, still being the sixth largest grocer. In 2002 Gerland's was Houston's seventh largest grocer, with 16 locations generating $185.9 million in sales. It had 1,005 Houston area employees. At the time its headquarters was in Pasadena. In 2015, Gerland's was purchased by Lewis Food Town, another local, independent grocer established in Houston. All Gerland's were converted to Food Town and the owners retired.

== Operations ==
Most grocery stores operated by the company are Gerland's Food Fair; stores are located in Houston, La Porte, unincorporated sections of Harris County, and unincorporated sections of Montgomery County.

Grand Market was an upscale store; it was located in Sugar Land until closing in 2011.

Food Town is another name brand; Food Town stores are located in Houston, unincorporated sections of Harris County, Sugar Land, and Deer Park. Two Food Town stores in unincorporated Harris County included combined gasoline stations and convenience stores referred to as Food Town Express, however they have both recently been shut down.

Check Cashing & More are check cashing stores; they are located in Houston, Pasadena, and Baytown.

Lewis Food Town bought out Gerland's as of 2015. Therefore changing all the Food Fairs they owned into Food Towns.
