= Politics of Houston =

Overview of the politics in the U.S. city of Houston, Texas

The politics of Houston in the U.S. state of Texas are complex and constantly shifting in part because the city is one of the fastest growing major cities in the United States and is the largest without zoning laws. Houston was founded in 1836 and incorporated in 1837. The city is the county seat of Harris County. A portion of southwest Houston extends into Fort Bend County and a small portion in the northeast extends into Montgomery County.

The city of Houston has a strong mayor–council government. The city's elected officials, serving four-year terms, are: the mayor, the city comptroller and 16 members of the city council. Under the strong mayor-council government, the mayor serves as the executive officer of the city. As the city's chief administrator and official representative, the mayor is responsible for the general management of the city and for seeing that all laws and ordinances are enforced.

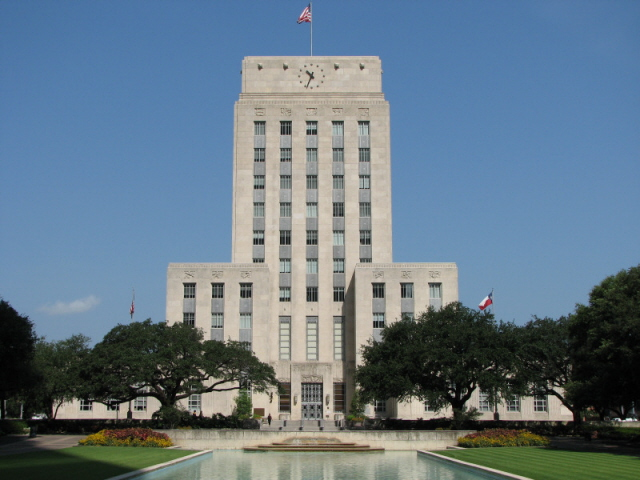
Houston City Hall

As the result of a 1991 referendum in Houston, the two-year term was amended to elected officials who can serve up to three terms until 2015 where the three-term limit and two-year terms were replaced with a two four-year terms – a mayor is elected for a four-year term (previously the mayor, controller, and councilmembers are elected to a two-year term prior to the November 3, 2015 city elections), and can be elected to as many as two consecutive terms. City council members, who also have a three-term limit, are elected from eleven districts in the city, along with five at-large council members, who represent the entire city. Term limits with the City of Houston are absolute – past elected officeholders are prohibited from campaigning for their former council positions (which includes the mayor and city controller). The current mayor of Houston is John Whitmire.

The city council lineup was based on a U.S. Justice Department mandate which took effect in 1979. Under the current city charter, when the population in the Houston city limits passed 2.2 million residents, the nine-member city council districts expanded to include two more city council districts. The municipal elections held on November 8, 2011, included the newly formed Districts J (located in the Greater Sharpstown area) and K (a section of Southwest Houston, Reliant Park, and Fort Bend County located within the Houston City Limits) where 2 candidates won over 50% of the vote. Houston is a home rule city and all municipal elections in the state of Texas are nonpartisan.

Many local lawmakers have been impacted by the city's term limits. Several former city officials—Anthony Hall, Rodney Ellis, Sheila Jackson-Lee, Sylvia Garcia, Martha Wong, Chris Bell, Annise Parker, Shelley Sekula-Gibbs, Adrian Garcia, Ed Gonzalez, and Mike Sullivan—chose to run for other elected positions once their terms expired or shortly before they were due to expire.

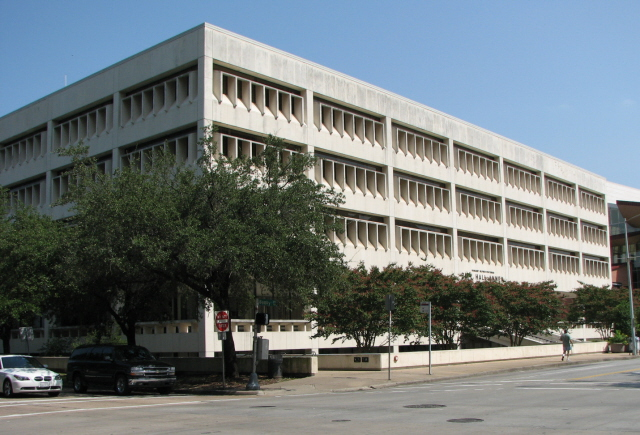
City Council Member offices located at the Margaret Helfrich Westerman City Hall Annex

Former mayor Lee P. Brown denounced the term limits, saying they prevented incumbents from gaining enough experience in city government. A proposal to double the current two-year term of office has been debated—as of 2005, several candidates for the city council have brought up the issue of whether term limits should be amended or eliminated. Some elected officials from the Greater Houston area within the Texas Legislature—primarily Garnet Coleman and Sylvester Turner—have also spoken out against term limits. In 2010, a term limits review commission appointed by former mayor Bill White called for amending the city charter on extending term limits where elected officials could serve two four-year terms; the proposal failed 8.18.10 after the Houston City Council voted 7–7. The November 3, 2015 City of Houston municipal elections a referendum on the voter ballot have amended the term limit law where elected officials can serve two four-year terms - this measure does not abolish term limits nor have a reeligibility provision for past elected officeholders who served their full tenure under the 1991 term limit ordinance. Incumbents who have won re-election during the 2015 election under the three-term rule - those who served 2 are granted an additional 4 years while a freshman councilmember are granted their 2 additional terms - this means that some elected officials can hold up to 10 years in office (if a freshman councilmember who served during their 2014–16 term) or 8 years in office (for those elected in 2011 and re-elected to their final term).

Houston has voted Democratic for more than a decade and is currently liberal leaning, despite being historically conservative. Currently, the majority of Houston elected officials are Democrats, and the city's mayors have been Democrats for over 40 years. The city has become the most ethnically diverse city in the United States with immigrants from all over the world, adding a unique dimension to the city's politics. As of 2017 approximately 28% of the city's population is immigrants and there is no single identifiable ethnic group that holds a majority in the city. Harris County as a whole is more of a swing area, as the longtime GOP majority in Commissioner's Court ended in 2018. Republican challenger Alexandra del Moral Mealer nearly defeated incumbent Harris County Judge Lina Hidalgo in November 2022, losing by 1 percentage point as GOP Commissioner Jack Cagle lost re-election to Democrat Lesley Briones.

== History ==
In 1912 the Government of Texas passed an amendment to the Texas Constitution that allowed the annexation of unincorporated areas. Since then the City of Houston annexed various properties.

== Municipal government ==
=== Elected officials ===
Position	Name	First Elected	Areas Represented Council Districts Super Neighborhoods
Mayor	John Whitmire	2024	City-wide
City Controller	Chris Hollins	2024	City-wide
At-Large Position 1	Julian Ramirez	2023	City-wide
At-Large Position 2	Willie Davis	2024	City-wide
At-Large Position 3	Twila Carter	2023	City-wide
At-Large Position 4	Alejandra Salinas	2025	City-wide
At-Large Position 5	Sallie Alcorn	2019	City-wide
District A	Amy Peck	2019	District A serves areas in northwestern Houston. District A includes communities north of Interstate 10 (Katy Freeway), including Spring Branch. As of 2012 thousands of South Korean people live within District A. As of 2012, according to Rice University political scientist Bob Stein, voters in District A tend to be older people, conservative, and White American, and many follow the Tea Party movement. The voting base is such despite the presence of large Hispanic neighborhoods within District A. In the 2011 election voters favored Tea Party candidate Helena Brown over the incumbent, Brenda Stardig, because Stardig supported a "rain tax," passed in 2010, that taxed churches. In 2019 District A still leaned mainly to the right, and in that mayoral election a plurality in this district voted for Tony Buzbee.
District B	Tarsha Jackson	2020	District B serves areas in northern Houston and northeast Houston. Chris Moran of the Houston Chronicle said that the district "is considered an African-American stronghold." Most residents belong to racial and ethnic minorities. Areas within the district boundaries include Acres Homes, the Fifth Ward, and George Bush Intercontinental Airport. The Houston Chronicle said that District B's constituency "has been shortchanged historically on municipal services and economic development." A lot of illegal dumping occurs within the district. The newspaper added that the district has "a resilient community spirit." Kristen Mack of the Houston Chronicle said in 2005 that the district, prior to the 2011 redistricting, "is plagued by unkempt lots, clogged ditches and substandard streets." In 1987 District B included Clinton Park, the Fifth Ward, Fontane Place, Kashmere Gardens, Scenic Woods, Settegast, Songwood, and Trinity Gardens. It also included the Lake Houston and the Bush Airport areas. In 1987 the district was 69% African American. In 2019 in District B a large majority voted for Sylvester Turner in the mayoral election.
District C	Abbie Kamin	2019	District C extends from an area north of the 610 Loop, through the Houston Heights area, up to the Braeswood area. The current District C includes most of the Houston Heights, Montrose, the Houston Museum District, and some communities around Rice University. District C also includes the Braeswood area, Meyerland, Southampton, almost all of Oak Forest, Garden Oaks, and Timbergrove Manor. Because of the inclusion of the Montrose, Heights, and Rice University areas, it has the nickname "Hipstrict" for what Chris Moran of the Houston Chronicle refers to as its "progressive, urban ethic." The Houston Chronicle editorial base described District C as a district that should be "politically dynamic." Historically District C has covered areas within the "Inner Loop" (areas inside the 610 Loop) and western Houston. 20 years before 2011, Montrose was moved from District C to district D to avoid putting too many minorities in a single city council district. Kristen Mack of the Houston Chronicle said that District C, which "covers a diverse swath of southwest Houston", was "One of Houston's most economically diverse districts, it ranges from leafy Southampton near Rice University through more modest subdivisions and vast apartment warrens in the city's far southwest." Jerry Wood, a former city planner and neighborhood expert, said that all of the regions of District C were active in terms of politics. In the 1990s District C had a wedge shape. It extended from the Museum District to the Beltway 8 south side. It included Fondren Southwest, Meyerland, and Southampton. As 2011 city council redistricting approached, some members of Houston's gay community and some Houston area bloggers proposed returning Montrose to District C. Around 2011 an earlier plan would have combined the Heights and Montrose under a district called District J. The current District C has former turf once located in District H (West End (Washington Avenue), Houston Heights, Historic Sixth Ward) while retaining the Meyerland area (the rest of District C southwest of Meyerland became part of District K). In the November 2015 mayoral election, 25% of the District C voters selected Sylvester Turner, and in the runoff election the following month they favored Bill King over Turner by eleven points. In November 2019, 49% of the District C residents voted for Turner. Mark Jones, a political scientist of Rice University stated that while King ran in the 2019 election as well, the District C voters saw Turner and Tony Buzbee as the only likely candidates for mayor and that therefore they voted for Turner in opposition to Buzbee; according to Jones, the 2019 mayoral election's most significant result was in District C.
District D	Dr. Carolyn Evans-Shabaz	2019	District D extends from the northernmost area within Midtown southward to Beltway 8. District D includes Sunnyside, and it also includes the Third Ward. 20 years before 2011, Montrose was moved from District C to district D to avoid putting too many minorities in a single city council district. While Montrose was in District D, it was not able to have its own residents elected to city council where its residents usually campaigned for candidates who were GLBT friendly and/or involved with pro-HIV/AIDS awareness. Instead the district was forced to try to influence electoral contests involving candidates from other neighborhoods. In the 2011 redistricting Montrose was moved into District C. In 2019, a large majority in District D voted for Sylvester Turner in the mayoral election.
District E	Fred Flickinger	2023	District E mainly consists of Kingwood and the Houston portion of Clear Lake City. The City of Houston has a liaison who works with the District E representative and the residents of Kingwood. In 2006 some Kingwood residents told the Houston Chronicle that the District E representative has too little influence in city council, which had 15 seats during that year, and that the district is, in the words of Renée C. Lee of the Chronicle, territorially "spread too thin." In 2019 District E still leaned mainly to the right, and in that mayoral election a plurality in this district voted for Tony Buzbee.
District F	Tiffany D. Thomas	2019	District F serves areas in southwestern Houston. District F has a significant Vietnamese American community. District F includes much of the Alief, area other areas in Southwest Houston, Briarmeadow and Tanglewood, Houston. In 1985 District F included far Southwest Houston. It included Alief, Braeburn, Braeburn Valley West, Glenshire, Gulfton, Robindell, and Sharpstown. In 1985 the district was 83% white. In 2011 Briarmeadow and Tanglewood, areas south of Westheimer Road which were previously in District G, were moved to District F, while the Bellaire Boulevard areas and Sharpstown were moved out of District F.
District G	Mary Nan Huffman	2022	District G serves areas in western Houston. District G extends from an area inside the 610 Loop, between Interstate 10 (Katy Freeway) and Westheimer Road, westward to an area past Eldridge Road. Neighborhoods in District G include the Memorial area, River Oaks and Tanglewood. Briarmeadow and Tanglewood, two communities south of Westheimer Road, were previously in district G until 2011, when redistricting moved them into District F. In 1987 District G was the wealthiest city council district in Houston. It was about 90% white. It served River Oaks and most of Memorial, two very wealthy communities, and it also served Afton Oaks, the Ashford Area, Briargrove, Briarmeadow, Carvercrest, Greenway Plaza, the Uptown area, Lamar Terrace, Park Hollow Place, Shadow Oaks, Tanglewood, and Westpark Village. In 1987 Kim Cobb said that while it includes wealthy areas, District G "also includes neighborhoods suffering from a shortage of city services because of west Houston's breakneck growth during the boom years." During that year, Chris Chandler, a political candidate for District G, said, as paraphrased by Cobb, that Lamar Terrace was the "most troubled sector" of District G "and could stand a thorough cleanup by the Solid Waste Management Department." In 2019 District G still leaned mainly to the right, and in that mayoral election 39% of the voters in this district selected Tony Buzbee, with 31% favoring Turner and 20% for Bill King.
District H	Mario Castillo	2023	District H includes some areas north of the 610 Loop. Areas within the district include the Near Northside, areas in the Northside region extending to Little York Road, and some areas east of Downtown Houston. The district also includes a portion of the Houston Heights. Before the 2011 redistricting, District H included all of the Houston Heights. At the time District H was mostly Hispanic, but because of the inclusion of the Houston Heights, it was becoming increasingly non-Hispanic White.
District I	Joaquin Martinez	2023	District I includes neighborhoods in southeastern Houston, including several East End communities. It also includes most of Downtown Houston.
District J	Edward Pollard	2019	District J includes several neighborhoods along U.S. Route 59 (Southwest Freeway), outside of the 610 Loop. District J includes Gulfton and Sharpstown. The district stretches from the 610 Loop to an area south of Beltway 8. District J includes territory previously in districts C and F. District J was formed as a district to allow Hispanic and Latino Americans to more easily elect representatives catering to them; as of 2010 Hispanic and Latino people have 44% of Houston's population, but two of the eleven city council members were Hispanic or Latino. During the 2011 redistricting, Hispanic and Latino leaders asked Annise Parker, Mayor of Houston, to revise her proposed redistricting plan of city council areas. Instead of creating a new city council district to serve White communities within the 610 Loop, as the earlier plan had proposed, the revised plan called for making a mostly Hispanic district. Robert Jara, a political consultant of the group Campaign Strategies, drew the boundaries of District J in order to ensure that Gulfton and Sharpstown were together in one area. That way, the Hispanic residents could lobby for influence with their city council representative. As of 2011, 63.1% of residents are Hispanic and Latino. Significant numbers of White, Black, and Asian people live in the district. As of the same year, 17% of registered voters had family names of Spanish/Hispanic origin. Many people living in the district are not U.S. citizens. Jason Moran of the Houston Chronicle said that the area has been referred to as a "Hispanic opportunity district." In a May 2011 editorial the Houston Chronicle editors said that they support the redistricting plan since they believed that Hispanics need more representation, but they added that the election of a Hispanic to fill the position is not guaranteed because many of the residents are not U.S. citizens and are ineligible to vote. As an example, the editors pointed to the Texas State Legislature's establishment of the 29th congressional district so that a Hispanic/Latino could be elected as a member of the United States Congress. Gene Green, a non-Hispanic White, won the first election for the district in 1992. As of 2018 he is still the incumbent in the area - Green announced his retirement where former Houston City Controller Sylvia Garcia (Texas State Senator since 2013) won the 2018 Democratic primary as Green's successor.
District K	Martha Castex-Tatum	2018	District K is in far southwestern Houston. The editors of the Houston Chronicle said that it is "roughly at 7 o'clock if you pretend that our squiggly map is shaped like a circle." District K's approximate boundaries are Almeda Road, South Braeswood Boulevard, Gessner Road, and Farm to Market Road 2234 in Fort Bend County. The district includes Brays Oaks, Hiram Clarke, Reliant Stadium, Westbury, and areas of Houston in Fort Bend County. It also serves Willowbend. District K was formed in 2011, with territory taken from council districts C and D. As of 2011 it has an African-American plurality, and most of its residents were Black and Hispanic. In a 2011 editorial the Houston Chronicle editors stated that African-American voters likely would have control of the district. In 2019, in District K a large majority voted for Sylvester Turner in the mayoral election.

=== Super neighborhoods ===
During the administration of Lee P. Brown, starting in the year 2000 the City of Houston began grouping areas into "super neighborhoods." Communities with similar identities, infrastructures, and physical features were grouped into super neighborhoods. These were meant to encourage residents to come together to address the needs of their individual communities. Super Neighborhood Councils (made up of residents and stakeholders) are intended to be a "middle man" between the super neighborhood and the City of Houston.

=== Parks and Recreation Department ===
The City of Houston Parks and Recreation Department was created by a city ordinance on March 15, 1916. When it was created it had two parks, Hermann Park and Sam Houston Park. As of 2010 the department maintains about 350 developed parks and 200 esplanades and greenspaces inside and outside of the City of Houston.

=== Houston Airport System ===
The Houston Airport System manages three airports in the Houston city limits: George Bush Intercontinental Airport, William P. Hobby Airport, and Ellington Airport.

=== Courts ===
The City of Houston courts try instances of persons or entities violating the municipal code as well as violations of parking and traffic statutes.

County government courts try criminal violations of state law and other civil offenses. Harris County courts, in the post-Furman v. Georgia death penalty period, were more likely to hand down death sentences compared to other courts because the county had the financial resources to pursue capital punishment while other counties, fearful of losing funds, preferred life sentences.

=== Office of Emergency Management ===
The Office of Emergency Management coordinates the city's emergency response, and maintains the city's AlertHouston notification system.

=== Animal services ===
The Houston Bureau of Animal Regulation and Care (BARC), which operates the City of Houston municipal animal shelter, has its campus in the Fifth Ward.

== Regional agencies ==
The Houston Housing Authority (HHA) has a board of directors appointed by the Mayor of Houston, but is not a department of the city government.

== State government ==
The Texas Department of Transportation operates the Houston District Office in Houston.

The Texas Department of Criminal Justice (TDCJ) operates the Region III Parole Division headquarters in Houston. The Houston VI district parole office is located on the grounds of the headquarters. The Houston I, Houston II, Houston III, Houston IV, and Houston VII are located in other places in Houston. The Houston V district parole office is in Pasadena. The agency also operates the Joe Kegans Unit state jail facility in Downtown Houston.

The Huntsville Unit in Huntsville serves as the designated regional release center for prisoners arriving in the Houston area. Throughout the history of the Texas Prison System 90% of male prisoners, regardless of where they were being released, were sent to the unit for the final portions of their sentences before being released. Starting in September 2010 the TDCJ instead began to use regional release centers for male prisoners. Female prisoners throughout Texas who are not state jail prisoners or substance abuse felony punishment facility residents are released from the Christina Crain Unit in Gatesville.

The Texas Youth Commission (TYC) operates the Houston District Office in Greater Sharpstown, Houston. The closest TYC correctional facility to Houston is the Al Price State Juvenile Correctional Facility in unincorporated Jefferson County, near Beaumont. The TYC announced that the Al Price facility will close by August 31, 2011.

== Federal government ==
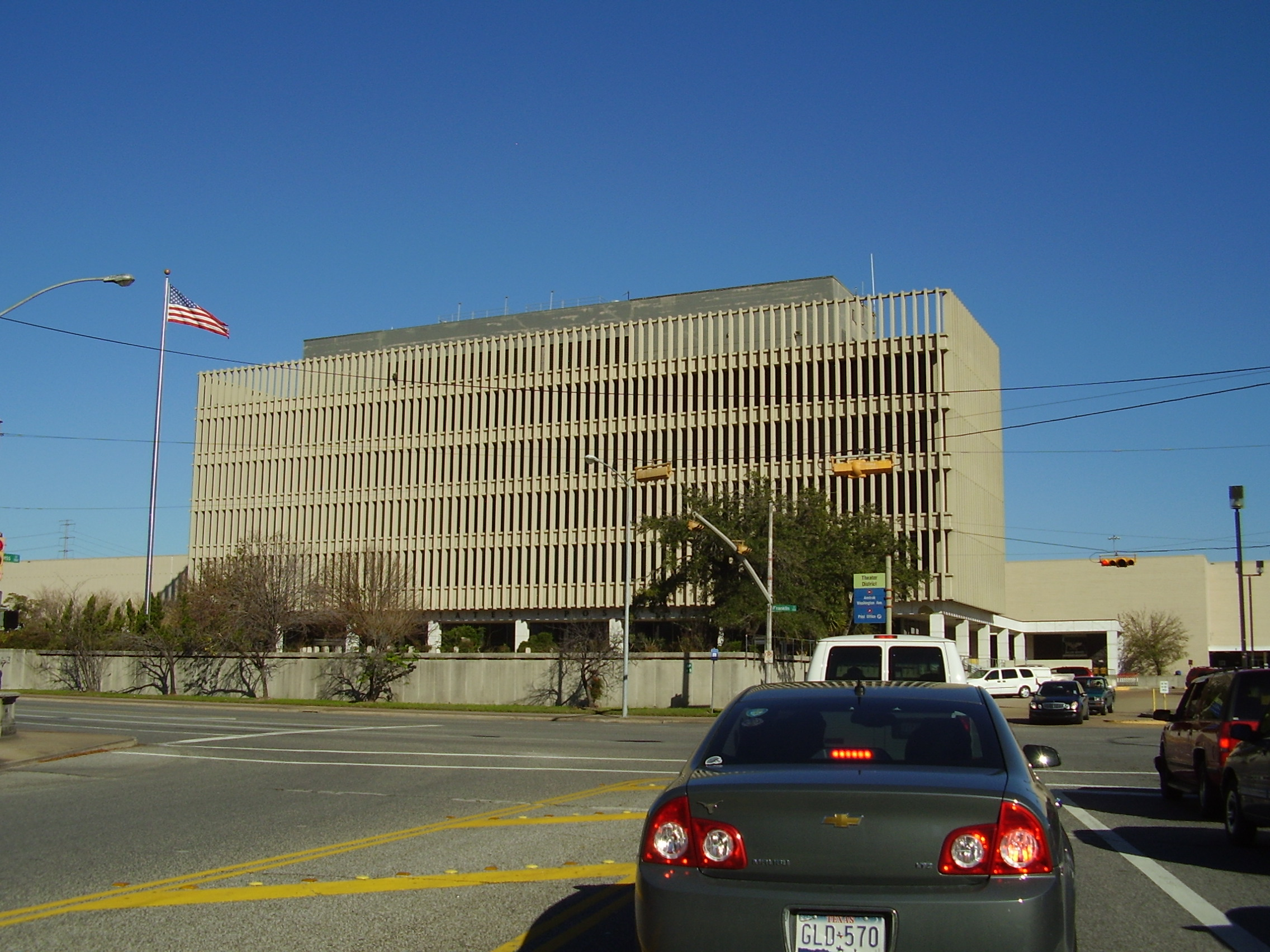
Houston Post Office

The United States Postal Service's main post office facility was the 16-acre (6.5 ha) Houston Post Office at 401 Franklin Street in Downtown Houston. In February 2009 the U.S. Postal Service announced that it was going to sell the Houston Post Office. The party buying the facility is required to build a replacement facility. The postal service operates station branches in other parts of Houston.

Not all city of Houston residents have "Houston, Texas" mailing addresses since the USPS does not base its mailing address names on actual municipal boundaries; some have Friendswood, Humble, Kingwood, Missouri City, and Stafford postal addresses. After the 1996 annexation of Kingwood, residents retained "Kingwood, Texas" mailing addresses, and some places in the city limits before the annexation had Kingwood mailing addresses. Residents of several other municipalities, including Jacinto City, Jersey Village, Nassau Bay, and West University Place, have "Houston, Texas" mailing addresses, and some residents of Missouri City also have Houston mailing addresses.

The U.S. Citizenship and Immigration Services Houston Field Office and the Houston office of the U.S. Immigration and Customs Enforcement (ICE) are in Greenspoint and in Houston. An ICE Special Agent in Charge (SAC) principal field office is also in Houston. The Houston Contract Detention Facility, operated by the Corrections Corporation of America on behalf of ICE, is located in Houston.

The Federal Reserve Bank of Dallas Houston Branch is located in the Fourth Ward of Houston.

=== Elected officials ===
Houston is represented in the United States Congress by U.S. Senators John Cornyn and Ted Cruz and U.S. Representatives Morgan Luttrell, Lizzie Fletcher, Al Green, Sylvia Garcia, Troy Nehls, Brian Babin, Dan Crenshaw, and Wesley Hunt. Texas's 18th congressional district, which includes part of Houston, has been vacant since the March 5, 2025 death of Sylvester Turner.

== Party affiliation ==
After 1960 and until 2016, Fort Bend County generally voted for Republican candidates in U.S. presidential elections.

58% of Houston area voters in the 2004 U.S. Presidential Election voted for George W. Bush. From 2008 and by 2016 increased urbanization caused an increase in votes for Democratic Party candidates in the Houston area, with several unincorporated areas of Harris County selecting Democrats and with declines in Republican voters in River Oaks, Upper Kirby, and Washington Avenue. In the 2012 U.S. Presidential Election, of the 151 election precincts in Harris County, Barack Obama was selected by majorities of voters in 60 of them.

In the 2016 U.S. Presidential Election, Houston area voters were split nearly evenly between Republican candidate Donald Trump and Democratic candidate Hillary Clinton. Residents of Brazoria, Fort Bend, Harris and Montgomery counties combined had about 20% of the people in Texas who voted for Trump and about 25% of the people in Texas who voted for Clinton. That year Alexa Ura of the Texas Tribune stated that "undeniably" the majority of Harris County voters now selected the Democratic candidate for presidential races. In that election, majorities of voters in 86 Harris County precincts selected Clinton, with the total number of precincts being the same as in 2012.

Circa 2017, there were ethnically mixed precincts in Harris and Fort Bend Counties with majority Republican voters as well as majority Democratic ones. In 2017 county level officers in Fort Bend County remained majority Republican and there was only one Democrat on the county commissioner's court.

== Voting base ==
Within the Houston city limits, in 2023, the bulk of active voters were non-Hispanic White and Black, with White people divided between Democrats and Republicans. The bulk of African-Americans are in the Democratic Party, and so therefore the three major blocs are the white people in either political party and the African-American population. Michael Hardy of the Texas Monthly stated that a person wishing to become the Mayor of Houston would need to attract two of these blocs to win their election. In that period, 20% of the voting population was Hispanic and/or Latino, and a smaller number were Asian-American. The Hispanic and Latino population made up 45% of Houston's overall population, and therefore was under-represented in its voting base.

== Gallery ==
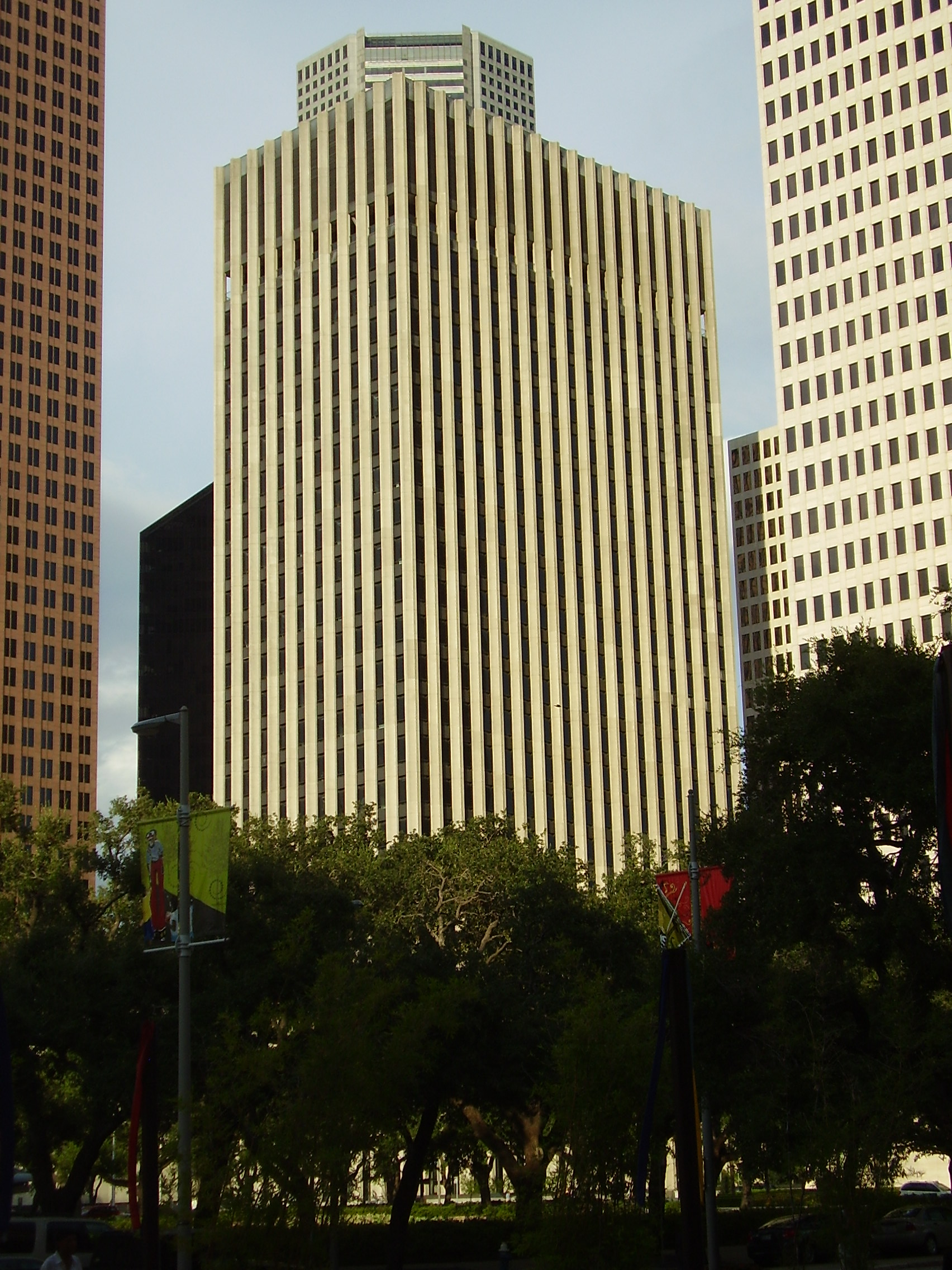
Bob Lanier Public Works Building

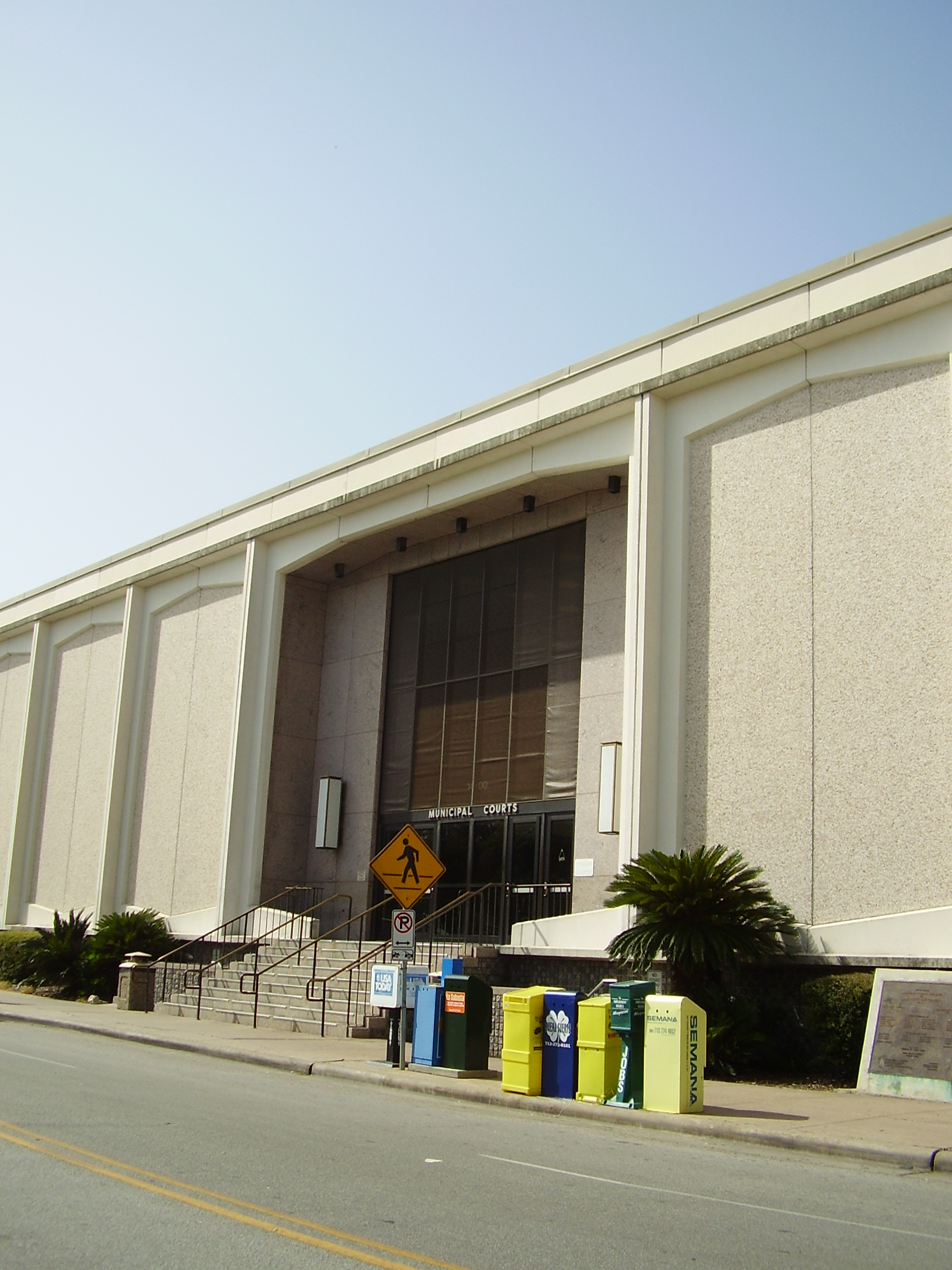
Municipal Courts, northwest of Downtown

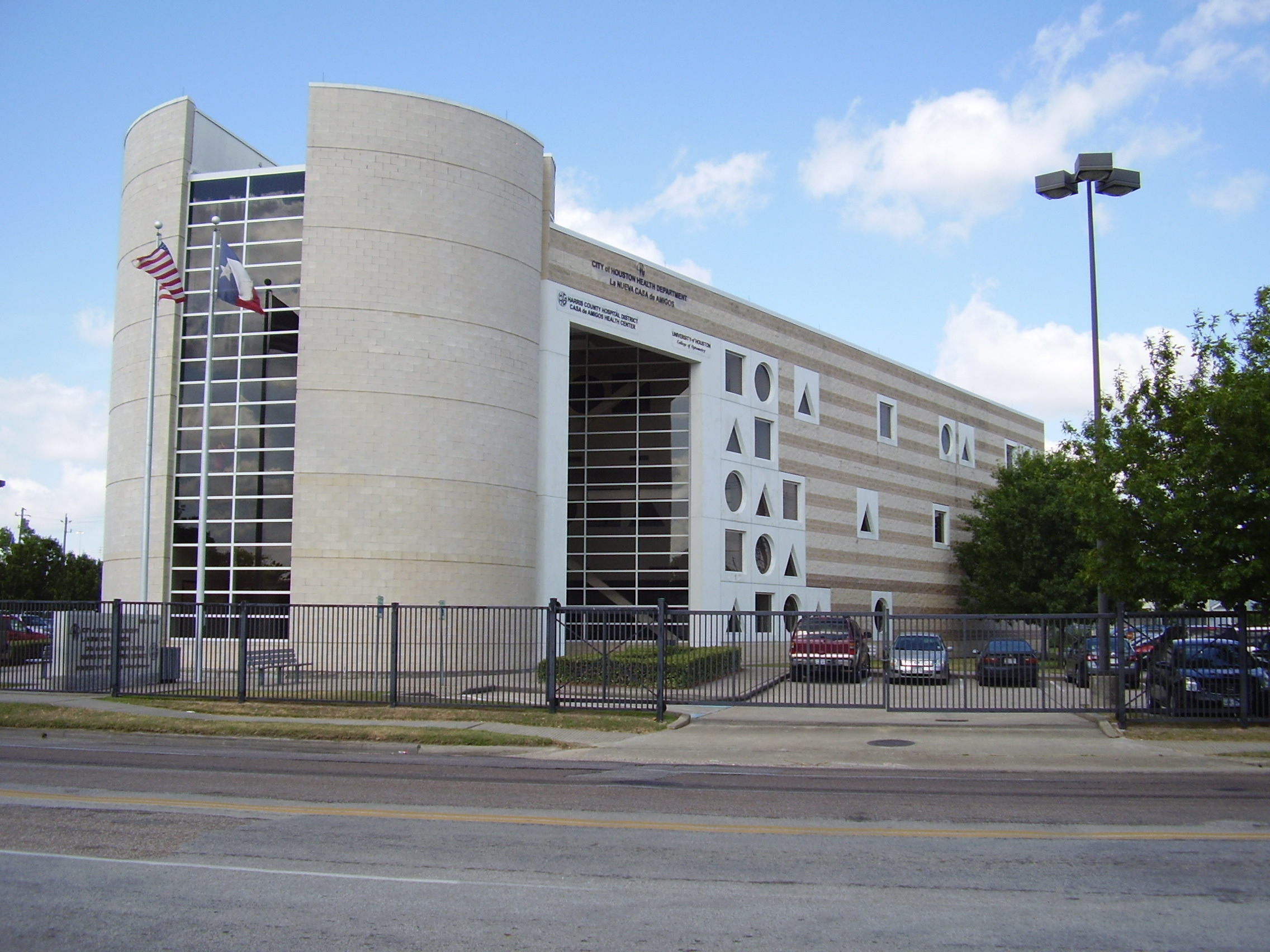
Health Department, in the Northside

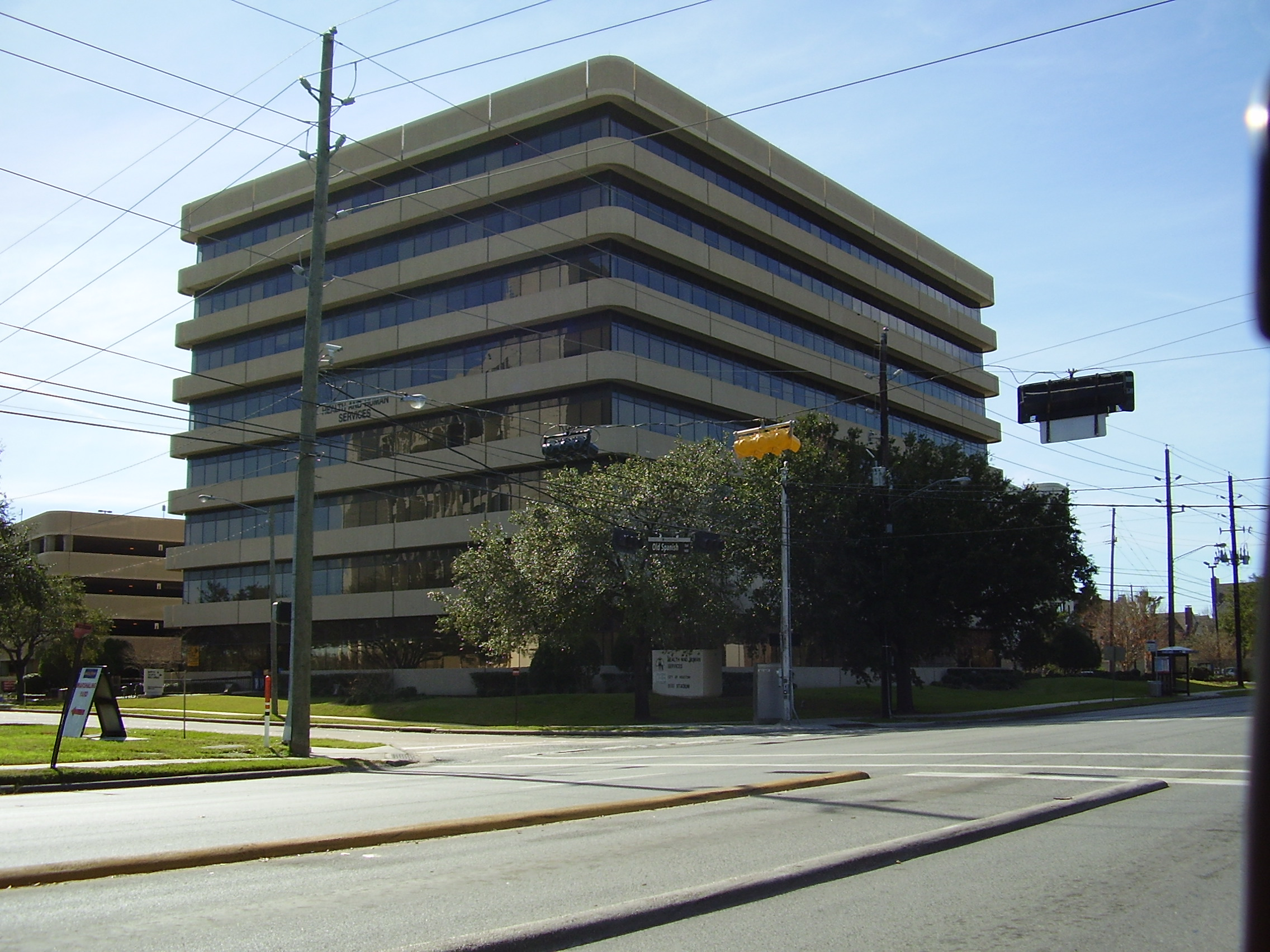
Health and Human Services, south of Downtown

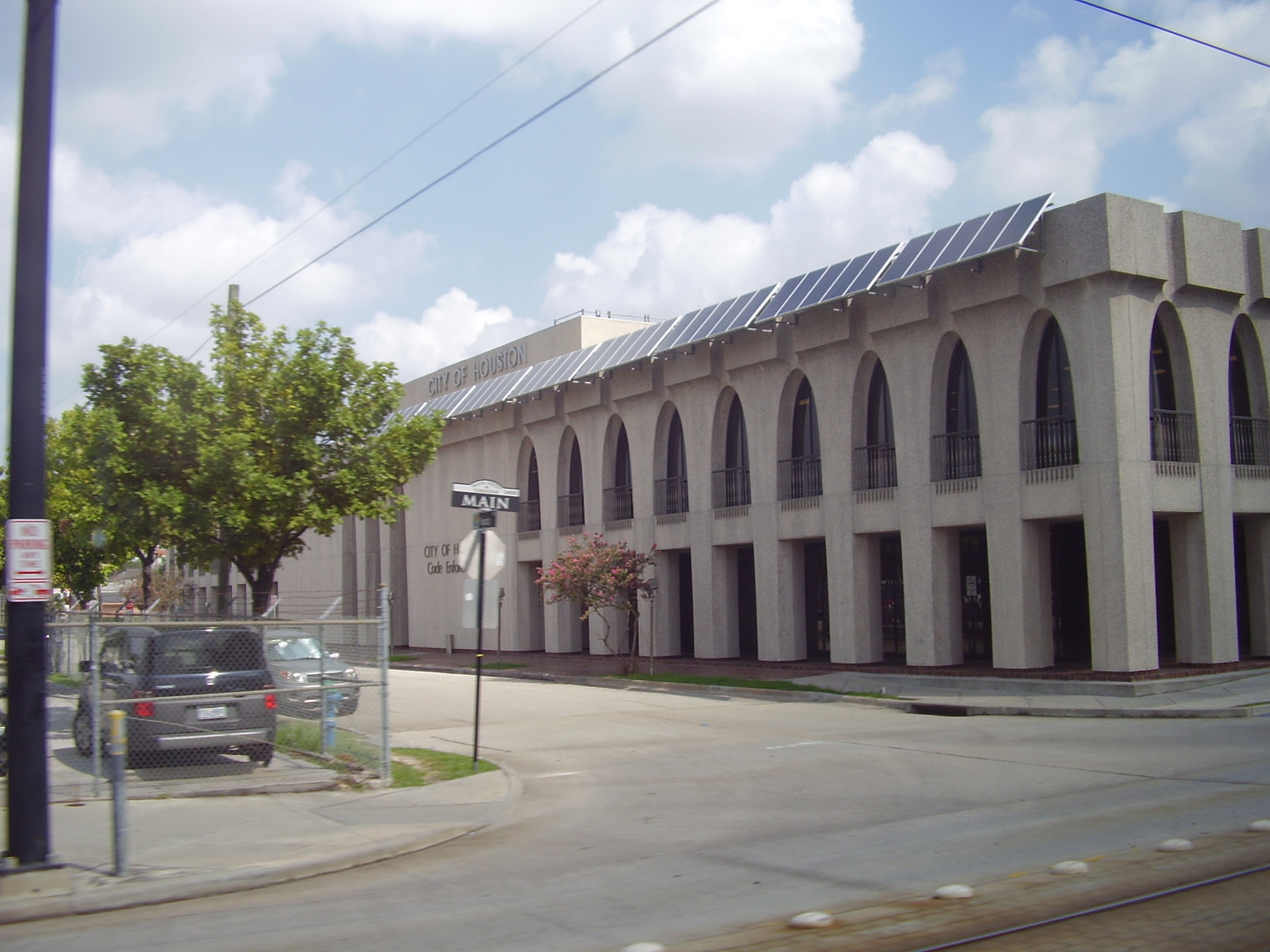
Code Enforcement, at the time located in Midtown

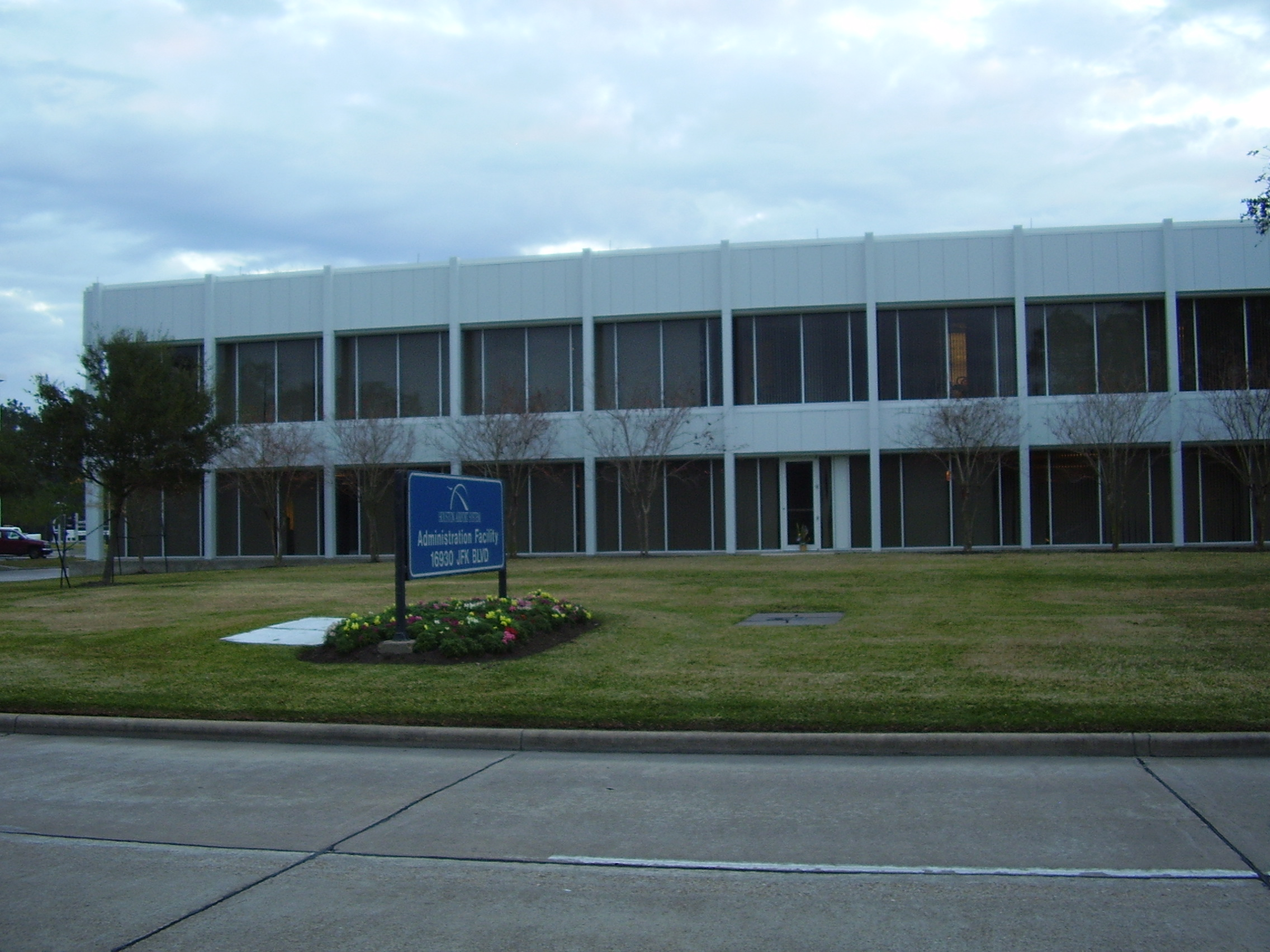
Houston Airport System Administration Building, near George Bush Intercontinental Airport

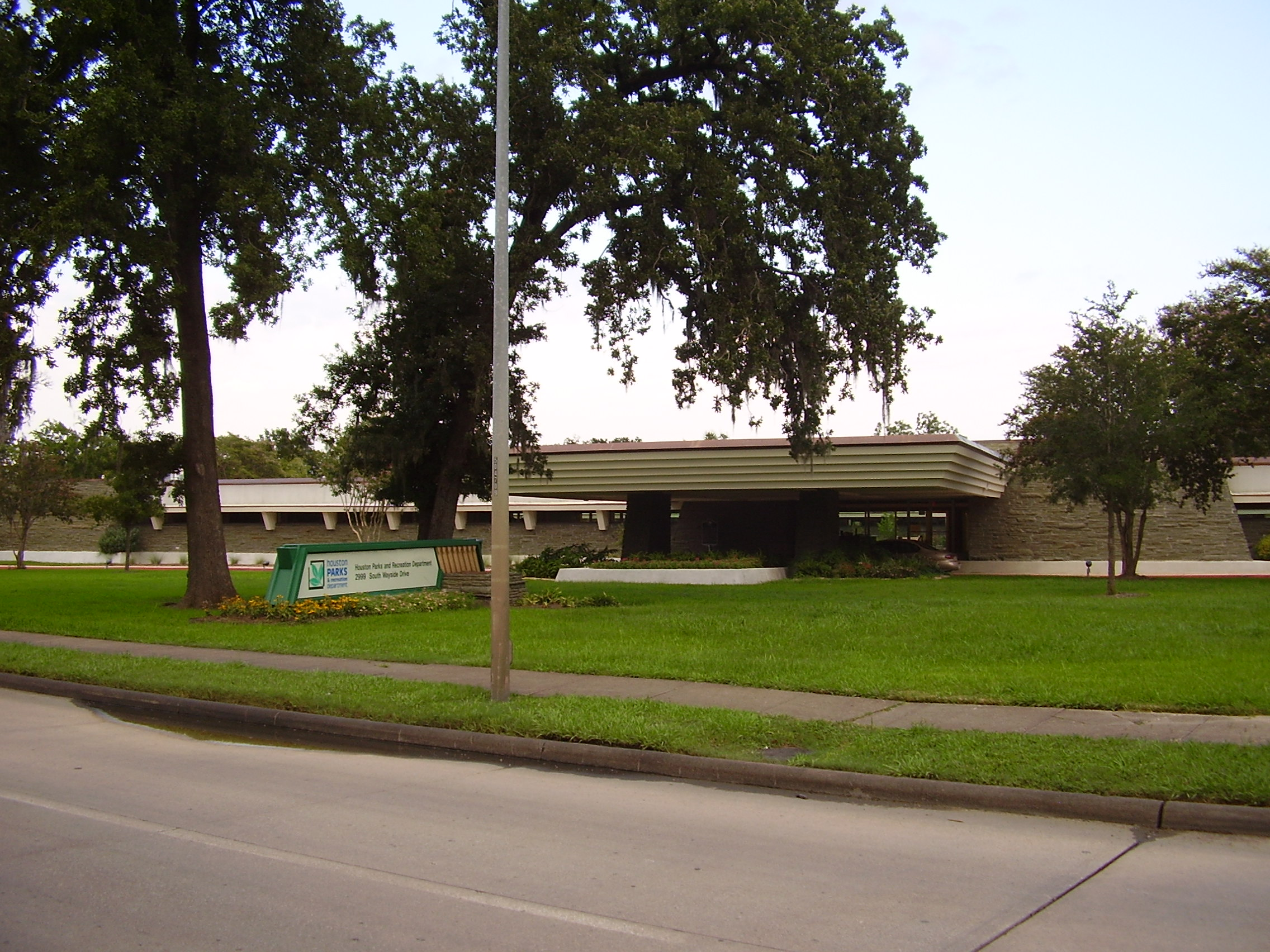
Houston Parks and Recreation Department headquarters

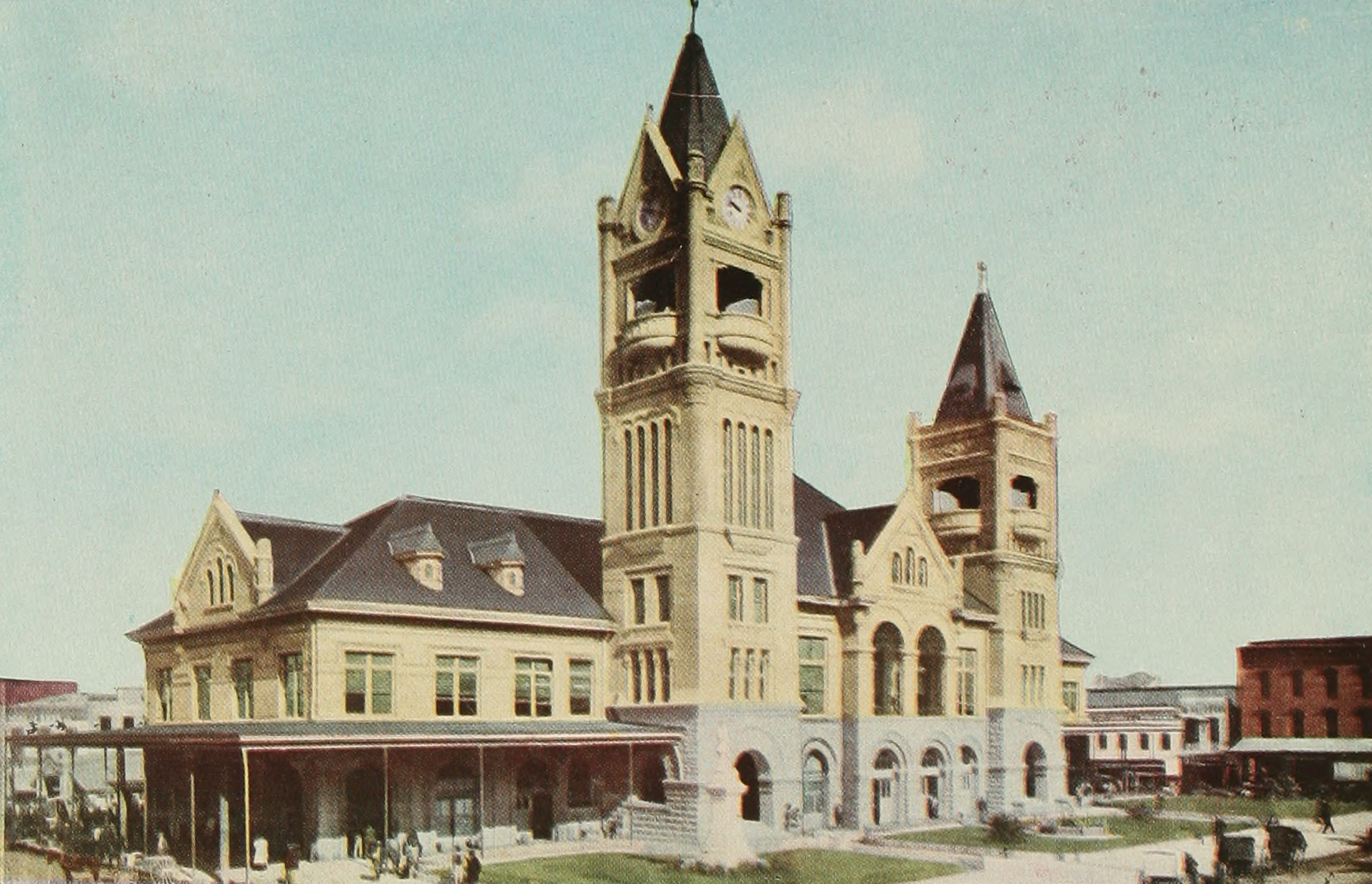
City Hall of Houston, 1913 illustration

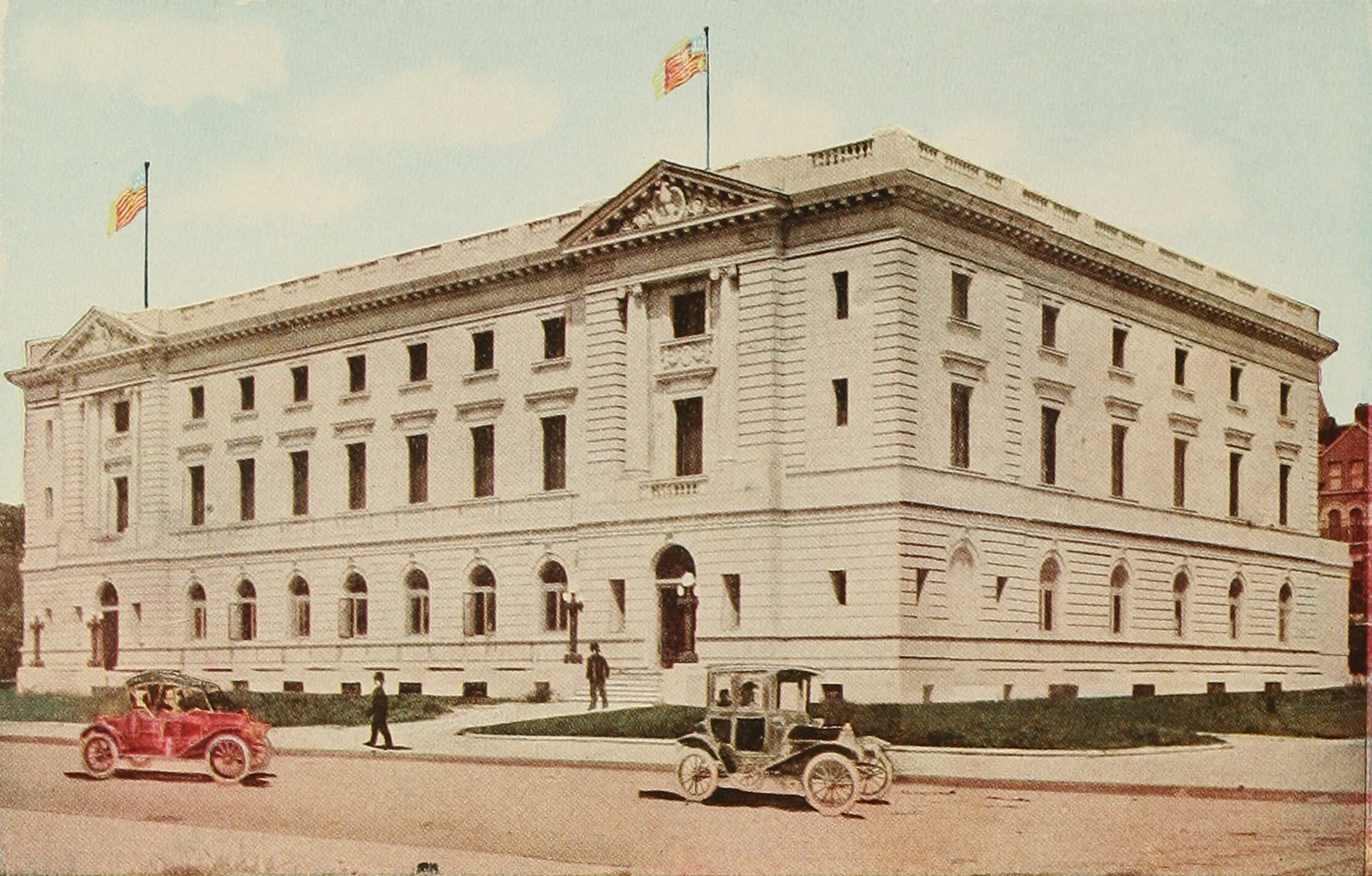
Post Office and Federal Building, 1913 illustration

== See also ==
- Harris County, Texas
- Fort Bend County, Texas
- Montgomery County, Texas
