= The Leader (Houston) =

Weekly newspaper published in Houston, Texas

- Type: Weekly newspaper
- Editor: Stefanie Thomas
- Headquarters: 2020 N Loop W Ste 220 Houston, TX 77018
- Website: theleadernews.com

The Leader is a weekly newspaper published in the Houston Heights, Houston, Texas. It is delivered to residences in the community. In addition to the Houston Heights it is distributed to other northwest Houston communities, including Garden Oaks and Oak Forest.

== History ==
Anne Sloan, author of Houston Heights, wrote that circa the 1950s The Leader was "floundering". At one point a man with the family name Burge acquired the publication, and according to Sloan Burge "brought" the publication "back to life in 1957." The man's son, Terry Burge, became the owner and publisher of the newspaper, serving in that role from circa 1970 to 2012. In 2012 McElvy Media, LLC, headed by Jonathan McElvy, acquired the publication. In summer 2022, California-based Street Media (CEO Brian Calle) bought The Leader along with McElvy Media's other assets, The Greensheet, The Fort Bend Star, Texas Printers, and The Charlotte Weekly.
