= Bureau of Animal Regulation and Care =

Bureau of Animal Regulation and Care (BARC) is an agency of the City of Houston which operates animal control and animal shelter services. Its facility is in the Fifth Ward. It is the municipal open-intake shelter for the Houston city limits.

It is a division of the city government's Administration & Regulatory Affairs Department (ARA). At one point it was an agency of the Houston Department of Health and Human Services.

== History ==
In 2004 a 12,000-square-foot (1,100 m^{2}) dog kennel was scheduled to open. It had a cost of $2,800,000.

In 2006 BARC euthanized on intake multiple breeds or group of breeds that the shelter administration deemed aggressive. While most American shelters at the time euthanized pit bulls on intake, BARC also euthanized Akita inus, bulldogs, cow chows, Doberman pinschers, German shepherds, and Rottweilers on intake.

In the years up to 2010, there had been frequent change in leadership. In 2009 Mike Glenn of the Houston Chronicle stated that BARC was "beleaguered"; that year, the agency dismissed the head veterinarian. In 2010 Craig Malislow of the Houston Press stated that BARC was "beleaguered" and had "a history of mismanagement, reckless disregard and outright abuse". That year, Jack Williams of Houston Public Media used the same "beleaguered" adjective and stated that BARC "developed a bad reputation over the past few years."

Circa 2010 David Atencio became the new leader of BARC. Mayor of Houston Annise Parker, in June 2010, stated that the city government was striving to improve BARC and make it as humane as possible.

In 2025 dogs that were taken from Houston-area shelters by pet rescues were discovered in suboptimal conditions, BARC increased oversight of any rescue groups wishing to pull animals from the shelter, and BARC stopped making public the list of animals scheduled to be euthanized. There was one dog rescue that BARC stopped working with due to the conditions of animals discovered there.

Best Friends Animal Society compiled a document stating that in 2025, BARC had the highest number of animals euthanized of any shelter in Texas. BARC stated that it has a status as an open-intake shelter, and so the report does not take this into account. As of 2024 BARC's live release rate is below the threshold for a "no-kill" shelter.

== See also ==
- Politics of Houston
