= Edward Pollard =

Edward Pollard may refer to:

- Edward A. Pollard (1832–1872), American author and journalist
- Edward Pollard (politician), Houston politician
- Ed Pollard (born 1962), Barbadian boxer
