= Houston City Council =

City council for the city of Houston, Texas, United States

Type
- Type: Unicameral

Leadership
- Mayor: John Whitmire (D)
- Mayor Pro-tempore: Martha Castex-Tatum (D)
- Vice Mayor Pro-tempore: Amy Peck (R)

Structure
- Seats: 16
- Political groups: Officially nonpartisan Majority: Democratic (10); Minority: Republican (6)

Meeting place
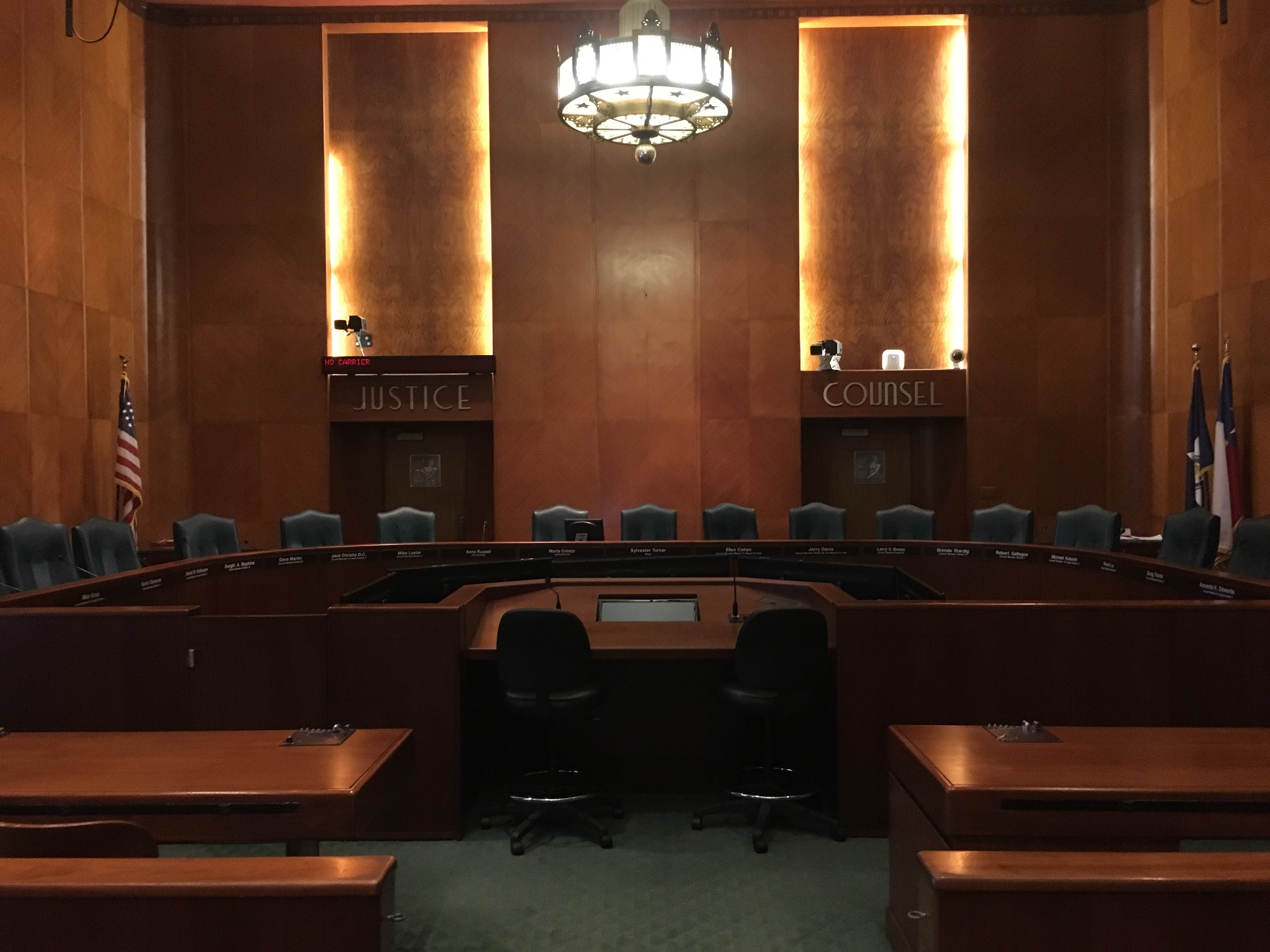
- Council Room; Houston City Hall

Interactive version

Interactive version

District map of the council in effect from 2014 to 2024 (top) and rejected district plan similar to current council district boundaries (bottom)

The Houston City Council is a city council for the city of Houston in the U.S. state of Texas.

The Council has sixteen members: eleven from council districts and five elected at-large. The members of the Council are elected every four years, with the most recent election being held in 2023 and the next being held in 2027. All positions are up for re-election at the same time. Council Members are limited to two terms of four years. Under the current city charter, if the population in the city limits went past 2.1 million residents, the previous nine-member city council districts would be expanded with the addition of two city council districts. Since the threshold was passed, the city created two new districts.

The Council works with the mayor in a strong mayor-council model. The City Council monitors the performance of city agencies, confirm the mayor's appointments, and makes land use decisions as well as legislating on a variety of other issues.

The Mayor chairs meetings of City Council and has a vote in the proceedings in all cases. In the event of the Mayor's absence, the Mayor Pro-Tem, a member of the Council chosen for the position by the mayor, presides over Council meetings. Should both the Mayor and Mayor Pro-Tem be unavailable, the Vice Mayor Pro-Tem, chosen for the position by fellow Council Members, will preside.

City Council and the Administrative Office of City Council (AOCC), a division of the Finance Department which serves administrative duties for the council, are housed in the City Hall Annex in Downtown Houston.

== History ==
Between the Reconstruction and the enacting of court-ordered city council redistricting in the 1970s, none of the city council members were black. Until 1972 all of the members of the city council were white.

== Members ==
| Position | Name | First elected | Party (officially nonpartisan) |
|---|---|---|---|
| District A | Amy Peck | 2019 | Republican |
| District B | Tarsha Jackson | 2020 | Democratic |
| District C | Joseph Panzarella | 2026 | Democratic |
| District D | Carolyn Evans-Shabazz | 2019 | Democratic |
| District E | Fred Flickinger | 2023 | Republican |
| District F | Tiffany Thomas | 2019 | Democratic |
| District G | Mary Nan Huffman | 2022 | Republican |
| District H | Mario Castillo | 2023 | Democratic |
| District I | Joaquin Martinez | 2023 | Democratic |
| District J | Edward Pollard | 2019 | Democratic |
| District K | Martha Castex-Tatum | 2018 | Democratic |
| At-Large Position 1 | Julian Ramirez | 2023 | Republican |
| At-Large Position 2 | Willie Davis | 2023 | Republican |
| At-Large Position 3 | Twila Carter | 2023 | Republican |
| At-Large Position 4 | Alejandra Salinas | 2025 | Democratic |
| At-Large Position 5 | Sallie Alcorn | 2019 | Democratic |

== Districts ==
As of 2011 the City of Houston has eleven city council districts, A through K.

The current City Council Districts were announced in 2011. District J and K were newly added. As of 2011, the populations of four districts (in terms of overall population and voting age population) are majority Hispanic, the populations of three districts are majority White, two districts have a majority African-American population, and one is close to being majority African American. Of the districts, one has a significant Asian American population. Both new districts are in Southwest Houston.

=== District A ===
District A serves areas in northwestern Houston. District A includes communities north of Interstate 10 (Katy Freeway), including Spring Branch. As of 2012 thousands of South Korean people live within District A.

As of 2012, according to Rice University political scientist Bob Stein, voters in District A tend to be older people, conservative, and White American, and many follow the Tea Party movement. The voting base is such despite the presence of large Hispanic neighborhoods within District A. In the 2011 election, voters favored Tea Party candidate Helena Brown over the incumbent, Brenda Stardig, because Stardig supported a "rain tax," passed in 2010, that taxed churches.

=== District B ===
District B serves areas in northern Houston and northeast Houston. Chris Moran of the Houston Chronicle said that the district "is considered an African-American stronghold." Most residents belong to racial and ethnic minorities.

Areas within the district boundaries include Acres Homes, the Fifth Ward, and George Bush Intercontinental Airport.

The Houston Chronicle said that District B's constituency "has been shortchanged historically on municipal services and economic development." A lot of illegal dumping occurs within the district. The newspaper added that the district has "a resilient community spirit." Kristen Mack of the Houston Chronicle said in 2005 that the district, prior to the 2011 redistricting, "is plagued by unkempt lots, clogged ditches and substandard streets."

In 1987 District B included Clinton Park, the Fifth Ward, Fontane Place, Kashmere Gardens, Scenic Woods, Settegast, Songwood, and Trinity Gardens. It also included the Lake Houston and the Bush Airport areas. In 1987 the district was 69% African American.

As of 2020 the runoff for District B had not yet taken place even though the first round of the election occurred in 2019.

After a year-long delay the runoff election for District B took place Dec. 12, 2020, between Tarsha Jackson, an advocate for criminal justice reform, and Cynthia Bailey, head of a non-profit focused on helping local kids. Jackson defeated Bailey with 68.5% of the vote.

=== District C ===
District C extends from an area north of the 610 Loop, through the Houston Heights area, down to the Braeswood area. The current District C includes most of the Houston Heights, Montrose, the Houston Museum District, and some communities around Rice University. District C also includes the Braeswood area, Meyerland, Southampton, almost all of Oak Forest.

Because of the inclusion of the Montrose, Heights, and Rice University areas, it has the nickname "Hipstrict" for what Chris Moran of the Houston Chronicle refers to as its "progressive, urban ethic." The Houston Chronicle editorial base described District C as a district that should be "politically dynamic."

Historically District C has covered areas within the "Inner Loop" (areas inside the 610 Loop) and western Houston. 20 years before 2011, Montrose was moved from District C to district D to avoid putting too many minorities in a single city council district. Kristen Mack of the Houston Chronicle said that District C, which "covers a diverse swath of southwest Houston", was "One of Houston's most economically diverse districts, it ranges from leafy Southampton near Rice University through more modest subdivisions and vast apartment warrens in the city's far southwest." Jerry Wood, a former city planner and neighborhood expert, said that all of the regions of District C were active in terms of politics.

In the 1990s District C had a wedge shape. It extended from the Museum District to the Beltway 8 south side. It included Fondren Southwest, Meyerland, and Southampton.

As 2011 city council redistricting approached, some members of Houston's gay community and some Houston area bloggers proposed returning Montrose to District C. Around 2011 an earlier plan would have combined the Heights and Montrose under a district called District J.

=== District D ===
District D extends from the northernmost area within Midtown southward to Beltway 8. District D includes Sunnyside, and it also includes the Third Ward. District D is home to Texas Southern University and the University of Houston.

20 years before 2011, Montrose was moved from District C to district D to avoid putting too many minorities in a single city council district. While Montrose was in District D, it was not able to have its own residents elected to city council. Instead the district was forced to try to influence electoral contests involving candidates from other neighborhoods. In the 2011 redistricting Montrose was moved into District C.

=== District E ===
District E mainly consists of Kingwood and the Houston portion of Clear Lake City. The City of Houston has a liaison who works with the District E representative and the residents of Kingwood. In 2006 some Kingwood residents told the Houston Chronicle that the District E representative has too little influence in city council, which had 15 seats during that year, and that the district is, in the words of Renée C. Lee of the Chronicle, territorially "spread too thin."

=== District F ===
District F serves areas in southwestern Houston. As of 2011 District F has a significant Vietnamese American community, and as of 2013 the Vietnamese are more politically active than the Hispanic majority. District F includes much of the Alief area, Westchase, other areas in Southwest Houston, Briarmeadow, Tanglewilde. The largest communities were Alief and Westchase.

In 1985 District F included far Southwest Houston. It included Alief, Braeburn, Braeburn Valley West, Glenshire, Gulfton, Robindell, and Sharpstown. In 1985 the district was 83% white. In 2011 Briarmeadow and Tanglewilde, areas south of Westheimer Road which were previously in District G, were moved to District F, while the Bellaire Boulevard areas and Sharpstown were moved out of District F.

=== District G ===
District G serves areas in western Houston. District G extends from an area inside the 610 Loop, between Interstate 10 (Katy Freeway) and Westheimer Road, westward to an area past Eldridge Road. Neighborhoods in District G include the Memorial area, River Oaks and Tanglewood.

Briarmeadow and Tanglewilde, two communities south of Westheimer Road, were previously in district G until 2011, when redistricting moved them into District F.

In 1987 District G was the wealthiest city council district in Houston. It was about 90% white. It served River Oaks and most of Memorial, two very wealthy communities, and it also served Afton Oaks, the Ashford Area, Briargrove, Briarmeadow, Carvercrest, Greenway Plaza, the Uptown area, Lamar Terrace, Park Hollow Place, Shadow Oaks, Tanglewood, and Westpark Village. In 1987 Kim Cobb said that while it includes wealthy areas, District G "also includes neighborhoods suffering from a shortage of city services because of west Houston's breakneck growth during the boom years." During that year, Chris Chandler, a political candidate for District G, said, as paraphrased by Cobb, that Lamar Terrace was the "most troubled sector" of District G "and could stand a thorough cleanup by the Solid Waste Management Department."

=== District H ===
District H includes some areas north of the 610 Loop. Areas within the district include the Near Northside, areas in the Northside region extending to Little York Road, and some areas east of Downtown Houston. The district also includes a portion of the Houston Heights.

Before the 2011 redistricting, District H included all of the Houston Heights. At the time District H was mostly Hispanic, but because of the inclusion of the Houston Heights, it was becoming increasingly non-Hispanic White.

=== District I ===
District I includes neighborhoods in southeastern Houston, including several East End communities. It also includes most of Downtown Houston. District I had been established by 1979, with the first election campaign for City Council District I occurring during that year.

=== District J ===
District J includes several neighborhoods along U.S. Route 59 (Southwest Freeway), outside of the 610 Loop. District J includes Gulfton and Sharpstown. The district stretches from the 610 Loop to an area south of Beltway 8. District J includes territory previously in districts C and F.

District J was formed as a district to allow Hispanic and Latino Americans to more easily elect representatives catering to them; as of 2010 Hispanic and Latino people had 44% of Houston's population, but two of the eleven city council members were Hispanic or Latino. During the 2011 redistricting, Hispanic and Latino leaders asked Annise Parker, Mayor of Houston, to revise her proposed redistricting plan of city council areas. Instead of creating a new city council district to serve White communities within the 610 Loop, as the earlier plan had proposed, the revised plan called for making a mostly Hispanic district. Robert Jara, a political consultant of the group Campaign Strategies, drew the boundaries of District J in order to ensure that Gulfton and Sharpstown were together in one area. That way, the Hispanic residents could lobby for influence with their city council representative, whether they are of Hispanic origin or not.

As of 2011, 63.1% of residents were Hispanic and Latino. Significant numbers of White, Black, and Asian people live in the district. As of the same year, 17% of registered voters had family names of Spanish/Hispanic origin. Many people living in the district are not U.S. citizens. Jason Moran of the Houston Chronicle said that the area has been referred to as a "Hispanic opportunity district."

In a May 2011 editorial the Houston Chronicle editors said that they support the redistricting plan since they believed that Hispanics need more representation, but they added that the election of a Hispanic to fill the position is not guaranteed because many of the residents are not U.S. citizens and are ineligible to vote. As an example, the editors pointed to the Texas State Legislature's establishment of the 29th congressional district so that a Hispanic/Latino could be elected as a member of the United States Congress. Gene Green, a non-Hispanic White, won the first election for the district in 1992. As of 2011 he was still the incumbent in the area.

=== District K ===
District K is in far southwestern Houston. The editors of the Houston Chronicle said that it is "roughly at 7 o'clock if you pretend that our squiggly map is shaped like a circle." District K's approximate boundaries are Almeda Road, South Braeswood Boulevard, Gessner Road, and Farm to Market Road 2234 in Fort Bend County.

The district includes Brays Oaks, Hiram Clarke, Reliant Stadium, Westbury, and areas of Houston in Fort Bend County. It also serves Willowbend.

District K was formed in 2011, with territory taken from council districts C and D. As of 2011 it has an African-American plurality, and most of its residents were Black and Hispanic. In a 2011 editorial the Houston Chronicle editors stated that African-American voters likely would have control of the district.

== Notable former members ==
- Carroll G. Robinson (at-large council member)
- Jew Don Boney Jr.
- Helena Brown
- Annise Parker (at-large council member)
- Ben Reyes
- Gordon Quan
- Martha Wong
- Al Hoang
- Sheila Jackson Lee
- Michael Berry
- M.J. Khan
- Sue Lovell
- Rob Todd (Chairman Tower Commission)
- Orlando Sanchez (Harris County Treasurer)
- Mike Sullivan (Harris County Tax Assessor)
- Joe Roach
