= Oak Forest, Houston =

Residential community in Houston, Texas, United States

Coordinates: 29°49′41″N 95°25′31″W

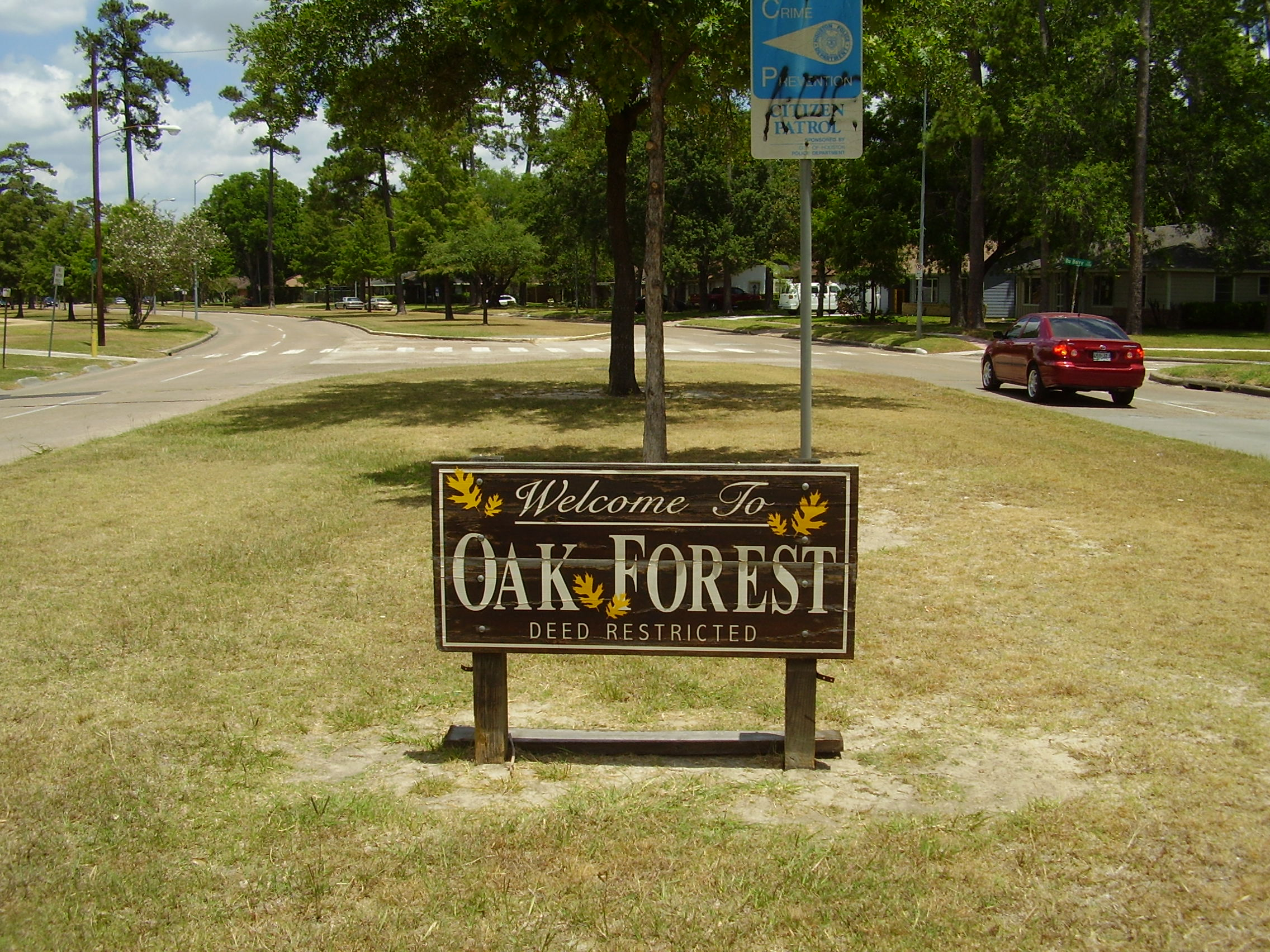
Oak Forest marker

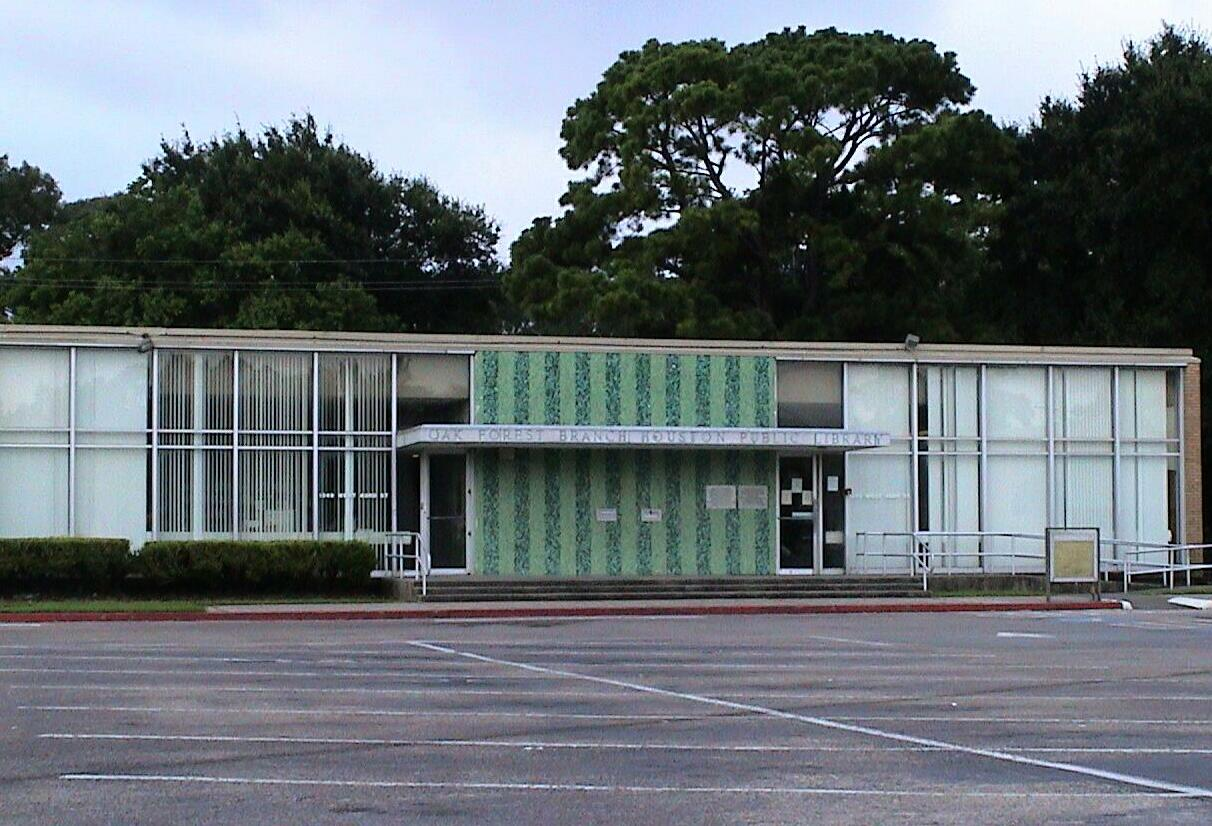
Oak Forest Branch Houston Public Library

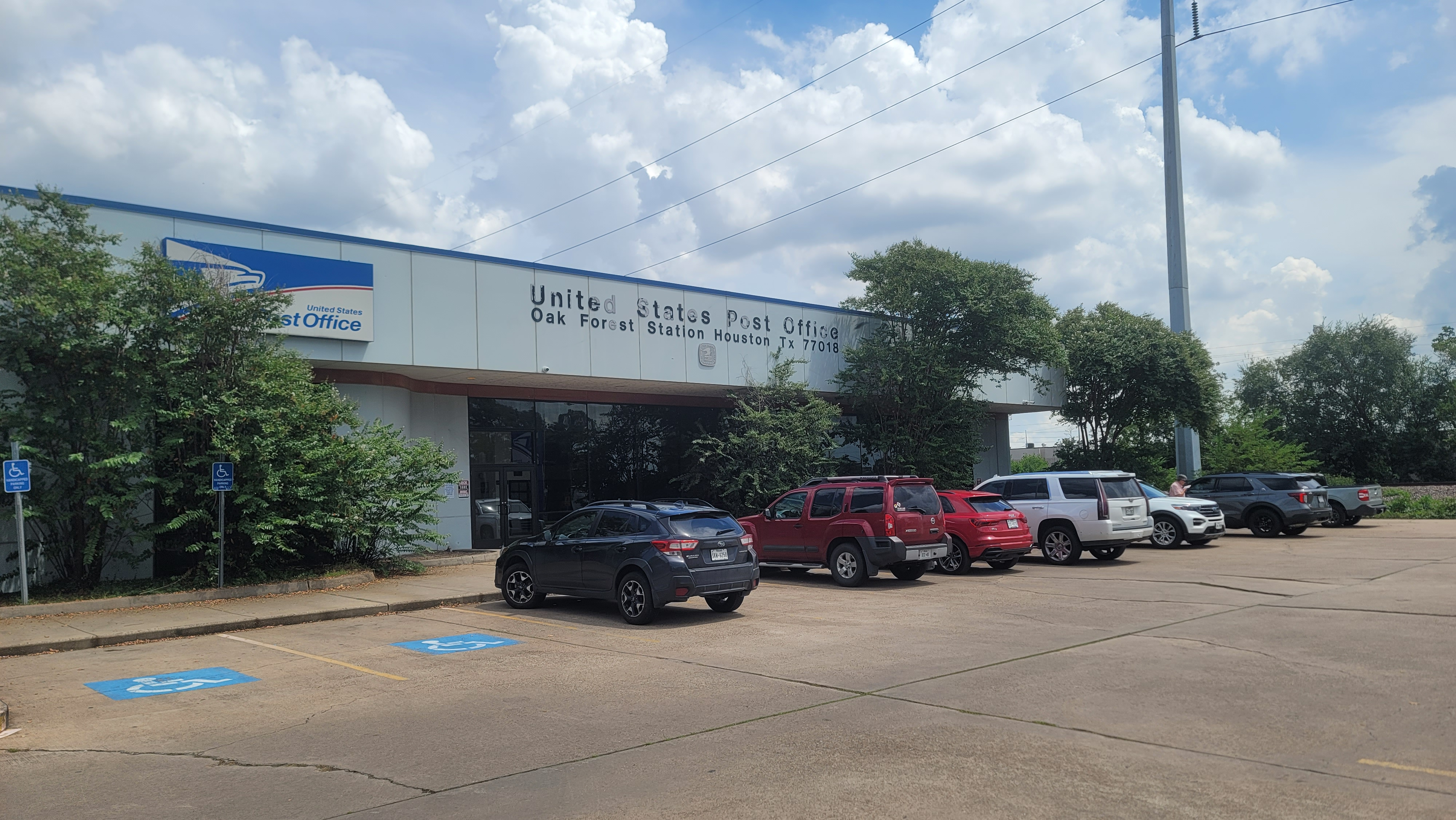
Oak Forest Station Post Office

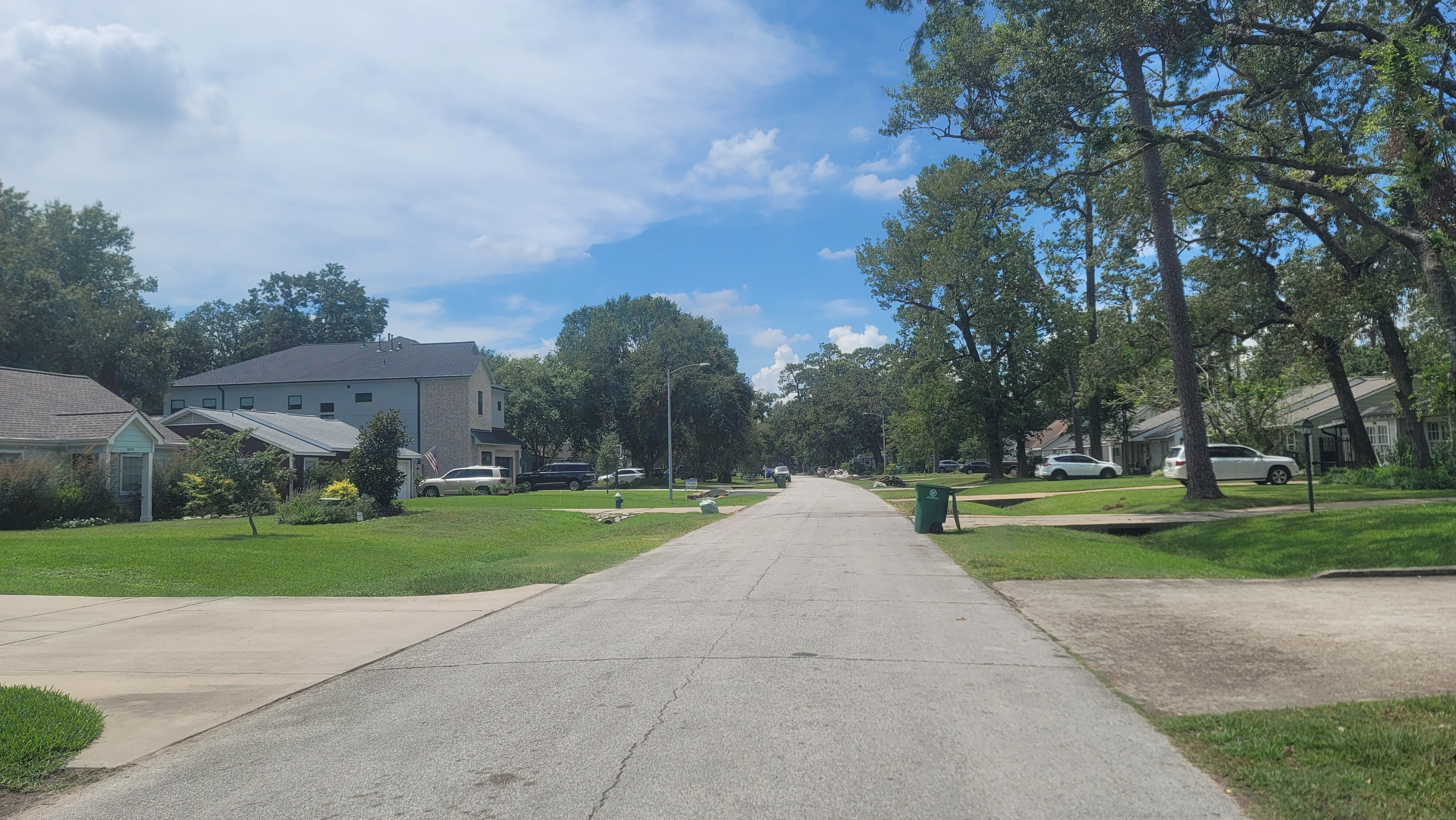
Lamont Lane

Oak Forest is a large residential community in northwest Houston, Texas, United States. Oak Forest is the third largest group of subdivisions in Harris County (behind Kingwood and Sharpstown).

== History ==
The territory which became Oak Forest was annexed by the City of Houston in the 1940s. Oak Forest was established in 1947 by Oak Forest Realty Corporation, owned by Frank Sharp, a developer who would later establish Sharpstown. Oak Forest Realty Corporation built houses only in Section 1 (Golf Dr to Oak Forest Dr, and Du Barry Ln to W 43rd St). Sharp would later develop the neighborhood for 17 additional sections by building streets and installing utility lines, but left the home construction to other contractors.

The first house, which served as a sales office, was built at the corner of Golf and Fisher Dr. Almost all of the first houses were sold to World War II veterans for $8,000-$10,000. One of the original homeowners, Ruth Metzger, bought her house in April 1947, when it was only a slab and still lived there through 2008.

Many of the original settlers moved from rural areas west of Houston and were of Polish Texan and Czech Texan origins.

Originally, there was no telephone service. If a homeowner needed to place a call, they had to use one in the construction shack on the corner of Wakefield and Kinley Lane or one in the house of Frank Sharp’s niece on Wakefield. Telephone service finally arrived in the middle of 1948.

Sufficient acreage in Oak Forest was set aside for churches, parks and schools. Areas were also reserved for commercial development and this accounts for the many grocery stores, cleaners, service stations, etc., which are located along W. 43rd St. between Ella Blvd. and Oak Forest Dr.

When it was first established, Oak Forest had golf course and the part north of Brickhouse Gully and west of White Oak Bayou was in Aldine Independent School District. The land was ceded to Houston ISD in 1958. The original Oak Forest Elementary was built in 1951, followed by Black Junior High School in 1958 and construction on Waltrip High School began in 1959 with the first classes held in the fall of 1960. Stevens Elementary was added as the area grew beyond the capacity of one elementary school.

Oak Forest was originally an unincorporated area in Harris County. It was annexed by the City of Houston about 1949. Sixty years later, there are 5,523 homes in Oak Forest with a population of over 23,000. Oak Forest is the third largest area after the annexation of Kingwood.

Houstonia magazine stated that beginning in 2000 Oak Forest began attracting "creative types" who wanted to establish families or who could not afford the Houston Heights or Montrose.

From 2005 to 2011 the number of house sales in Oak Forest increased by an annual average of 5.8%.

In February 2009 some Oak Forest residents reported increased burglaries and thefts.

In 2010 the Houston Press ranked Oak Forest one of the "Five Most Underrated Neighborhoods In Houston." 226 house sales occurred during that year.

In 2011 Jason Light, the owner of the real estate firm Light Group, was quoted in the Houston Chronicle referring to Oak Forest as the "new West University". Marlene Casares, a woman quoted in the same article, called Oak Forest as "like a little mini Bellaire, but with better prices."

By 2013 many families were moving into Oak Forest and nearby Garden Oaks.

In 2013 Houstonia magazine stated that Oak Forest, which was "starting to resemble a baby Bellaire or West University," was one of the "25 Hottest Neighborhoods" in Houston.

== Cityscape ==
Oak Forest is in northwest Houston, outside of, and north of the 610 Loop and east of U.S. Route 290. It is located near West 43rd Street, and is between T. C. Jester and Interstate 45. Richard Connelly of the Houston Press said "Oak Forest itself is a less prominent little sister to Garden Oaks" and that "Oak Forest offers everything Garden Oaks does, more or less, but at cheaper prices." Connelly added that if the 610 Loop experiences heavy traffic in its mainlanes, "there are plenty of alternative ways to get home." In 2011 Mel Reyna, the owner of the real estate firm Reyna Realty Group, said that Oak Forest has a relatively central location in the Houston area and large lots, and that Oak Forest is relatively affordable.

As of 2011 Oak Forest has 5,480 houses. The original houses are 1950s style houses. In 2005 the median housing price per square foot was $104 ($171.44 when adjusted for inflation). In 2010 it was $138 ($203.75 when adjusted for inflation). As of 2011 housing prices for new houses range from $550,000 ($787167.16 considering inflation) to $700,000 ($1001849.11 considering inflation), and housing prices for remodeled houses range from $200,000 ($286242.6 considering inflation) to $300,000 ($429363.91 considering inflation).

As of 2011 many homeowners tore down the original houses to build new 3,000-square-foot (280 m^{2}) houses. Jason Light of the real estate firm Light Group said that he had seen old houses torn down for larger new ones beginning in 2005, that few teardowns occurred during the Great Recession, but that around 2011 teardowns were beginning to reoccur. Light said that other families instead choose to remodel their older houses.

== Government and infrastructure ==
=== Local government ===
Almost all of Oak Forest is located in Houston City Council District C. A small portion is in council district A.

The Houston Fire Department operates Station 13 Oak Forest at 2215 West 43rd Street; Station 13 is part of Fire District 31.

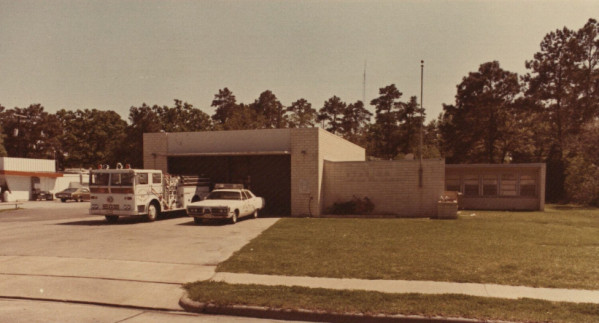
Houston Fire Station 13, 1976

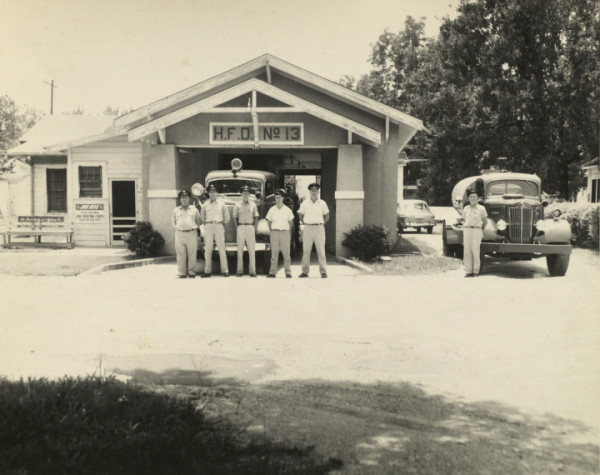
Fire Station 13, 1950

The area is within the Houston Police Department's North Patrol Division with headquarters at 9455 West Montgomery Road. The Near North Storefront is located at 1335 West 43rd Street.

=== County, federal, and state representation ===
Oak Forest is within Harris County Precinct 4. Harris County Hospital District operates the Northwest Health Center at 1100 West 34th Street.

The United States Postal Service Oak Forest Post Office is located at 2499 Judiway Street.

As of 2011 a proposed U.S. Congressional district would put Oak Forest in the same district as Rye, Texas.

Harris Health System (formerly Harris County Hospital District) designated Northwest Health Center for the ZIP codes 77018 and 77092. The nearest public hospital is Ben Taub General Hospital in the Texas Medical Center.

== Education ==
=== Primary and secondary education ===
==== Public schools ====
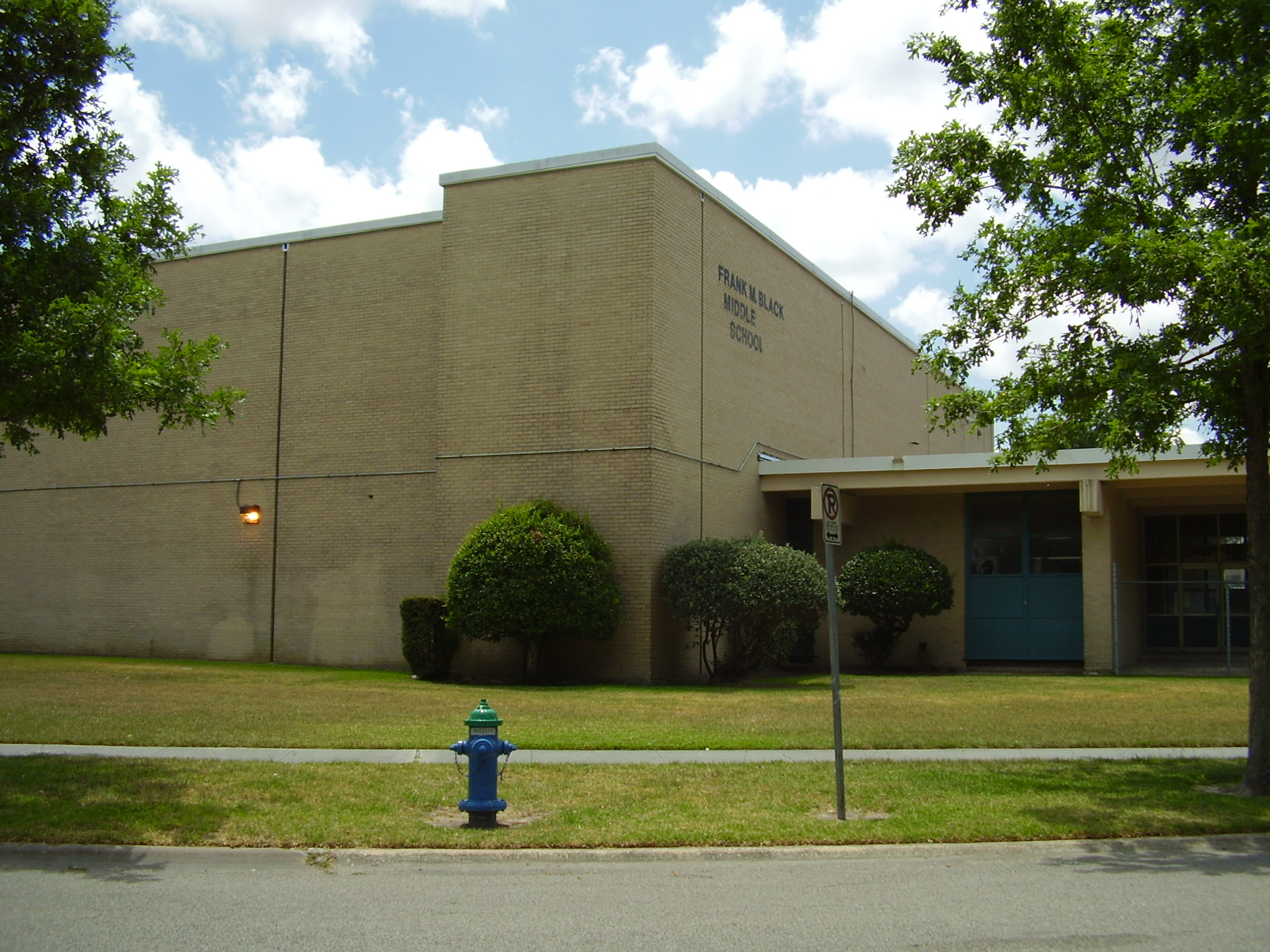
Frank Black Middle School

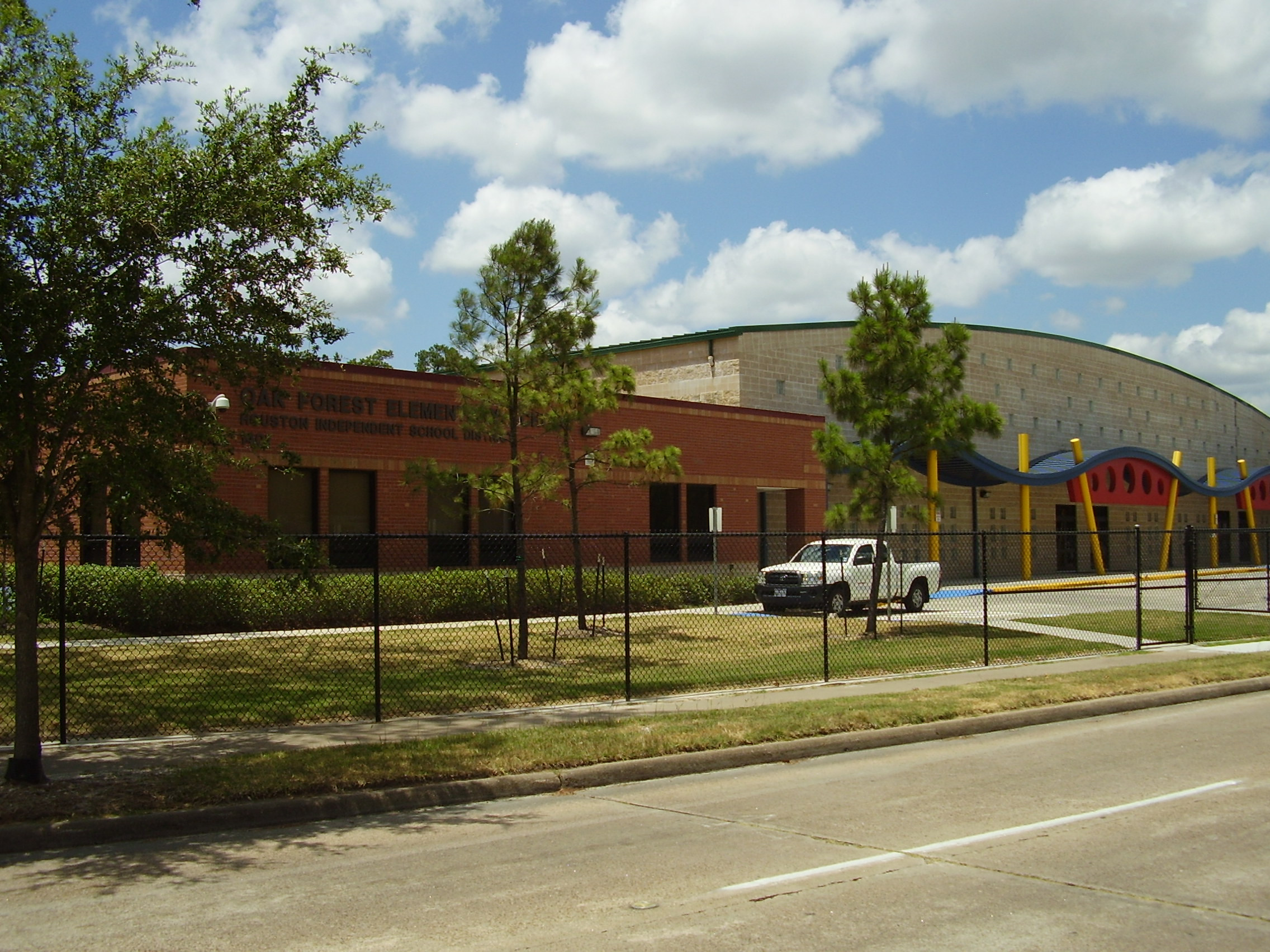
Oak Forest Elementary School

Oak Forest's public schools are operated by Houston Independent School District. The community is divided between Trustee District I and Trustee District VII.

Elementary schools that serve Oak Forest include:

- Oak Forest Elementary School
- Garden Oaks Elementary School
- Katherine Smith Elementary School
- Stevens Elementary School
- Benbrook Elementary School
- Wainwright Elementary School

In 2011 Jason Light of the real estate firm Light Group said many families were moving into Oak Forest and building new houses since Oak Forest Elementary "is a top-rated school."

Parts of Oak Forest in the east are served by Frank Black Middle School, while parts of Oak Forest in the west are served by Clifton Middle School. Both Oak Forest Elementary and Frank M. Black Middle are on a single piece of property in Oak Forest Section 2. Parts of Oak Forest in the east are served by Waltrip High School, while parts of Oak Forest in the west are served by Scarborough High School.

==== Private schools ====
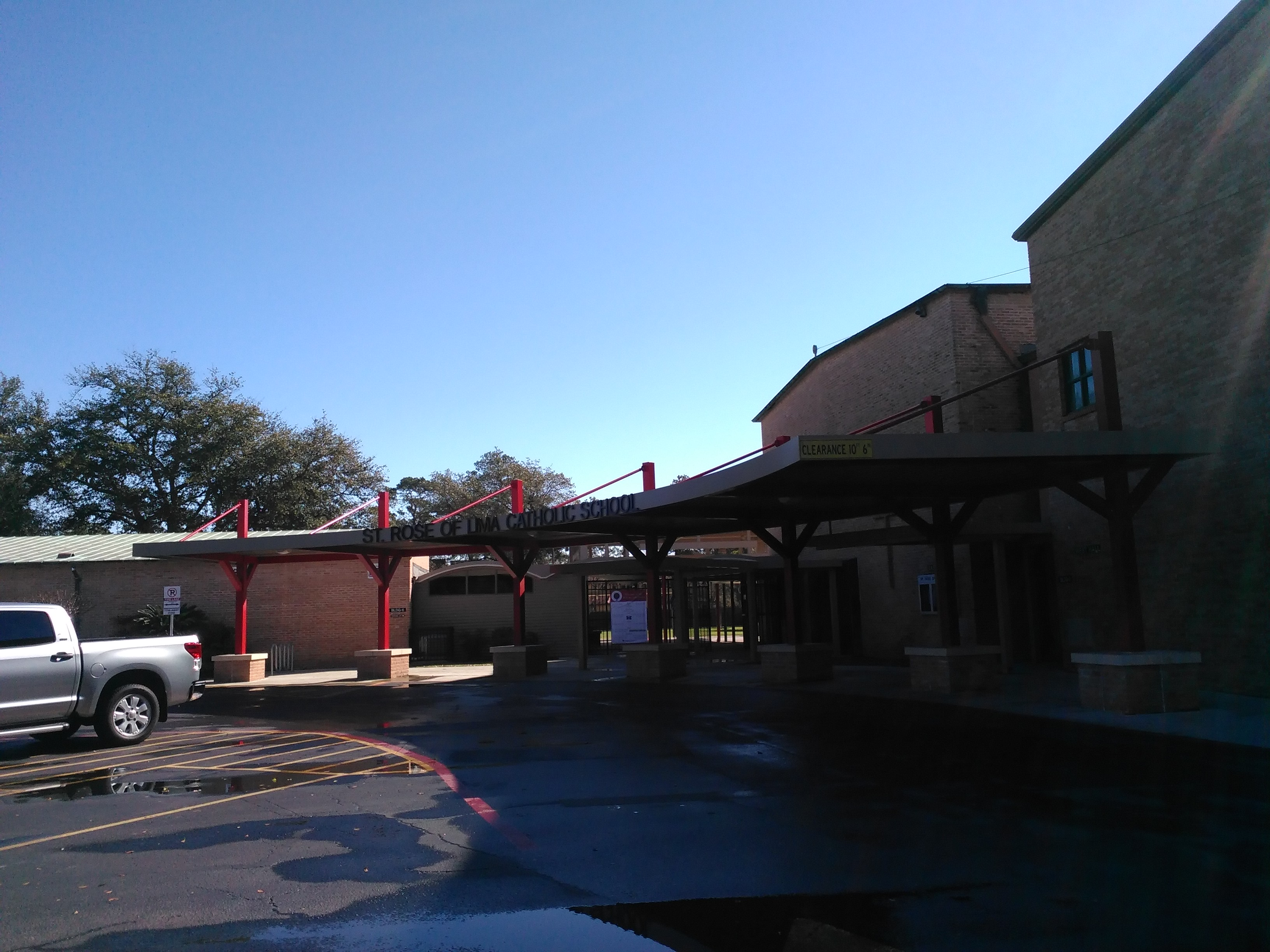
St. Rose of Lima Catholic School

St. Rose of Lima Catholic School is affiliated with the church of the same name. In 2014 John Nova Lomax of Houstonia wrote that it "was the neighborhood focal point, and still is, some say."

=== Public libraries ===
Houston Public Library operates the Oak Forest Neighborhood Library at 1349 West 43rd Street and the Collier Regional Library at 6200 Pinemont Drive. The Oak Forest Library is in Section 1.

== Media ==
The local weekly newspaper The Leader is distributed to Oak Forest.

The Houston Chronicle is the citywide paper.

== Parks and recreation ==
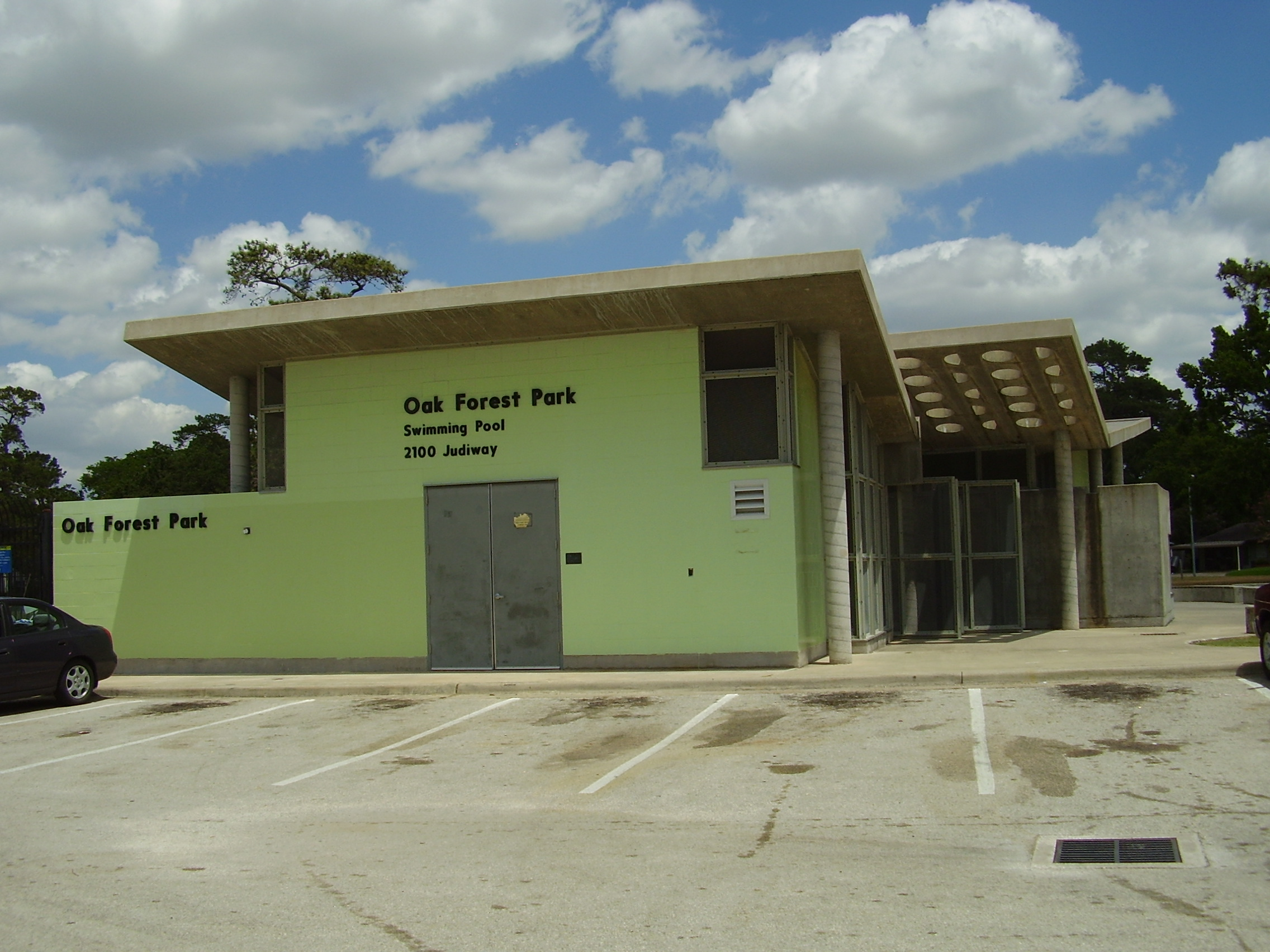
Oak Forest Park

Oak Forest Park is located at 2100 Judiway, in Oak Forest Section 2. Candlelight Community Center and Park is at 1520 Candlelight. It has an indoor gymnasium, a playground, a lighted sports field, and a .45 mile hike and bicycle trail. T.C. Jester Park is located at 4201 TC Jester, West.

The Northwest Branch YMCA is the closest YMCA to Oak Forest.

== Crime ==
In 2013, Casey Michel of the Houston Press said "And until recently, [Oak Forest] had been one of the more placid" communities in Houston.

Jennifer Latson of the Houston Chronicle said that the murder of Jennifer Ertman and Elizabeth Peña in 1993 "shook" Oak Forest "to its foundation." T.C. Jester Park has a memorial to the girls. In addition Waltrip High School has a memorial to the girls, as they were students at the school.

In 2013 there had been a string of "driveway holdups" and the Houston Police Department asked Oak Forest residents to not venture outside during night hours. In response, the Armed Citizen Project, a nonprofit organization based in Houston, gave free shotguns to residents.

== Notable residents ==
- Patrick Swayze
- Lyle deLaunay

== See also ==
- Garden Oaks, Houston
- Independence Heights, Houston
- Acres Homes, Houston
