= Sallie Alcorn =

American politician

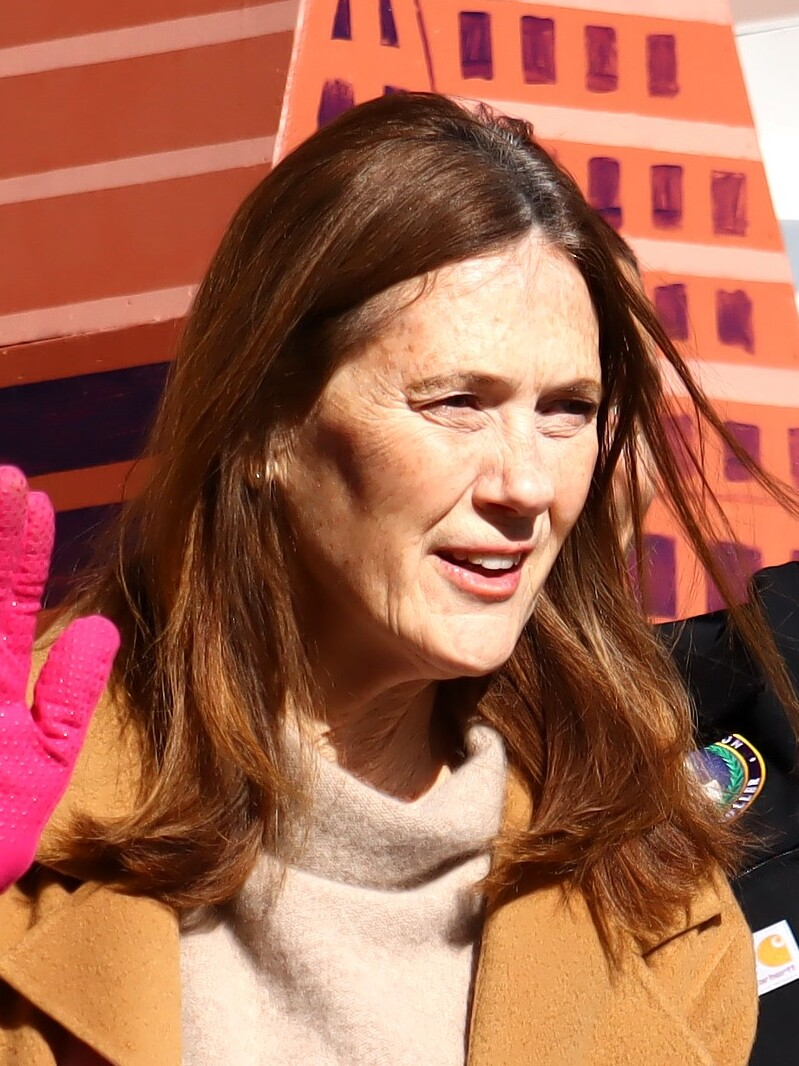
- Alcorn in 2026

Member of Houston City Council for At-Large Position 5
- Incumbent
- Assumed office January 2, 2020
- Preceded by: Jack Christie

Personal details
- Party: Democratic
- Spouse: George Alcorn
- Children: 4
- Education: University of Texas at Austin (BBA); University of Houston (MA)

Sallie Alcorn is an American politician who has held political office as an at-large council member in the City of Houston, Texas since 2020. Alcorn collected 22.8% of the votes in the November 5, 2019 general election, which triggered a runoff. She won her runoff election on December 14, 2019, with 52.8% (90,235) of the vote. Although Houston City Council had previously held a female majority from 2006 to 2007, Alcorn will be serving with the largest number of female council members elected to office at one time in council history after the District B election is settled.

== Early life and education ==
Alcorn (née Comstock) was born in North Carolina and moved to Houston when she was in the seventh grade, later graduating from Westchester High School. She received a BBA in finance from the University of Texas at Austin and an MA in Public Administration from the University of Houston.

== Political career ==
Alcorn's first run for public office was in 2019. She accumulated the largest number of votes in a 9-person race which secured her seat a runoff against Eric Dick, which Alcorn won.

Since being elected to office, Alcorn has focused on facilitating shared services between the City of Houston and Harris County, increasing transparency and community engagement surrounding the municipal budget, and focusing on ensuring the City of Houston prioritizes smart fiscal policies. Most recently, through unanimous approval of Council, Alcorn passed an amendment that prioritizes identifying areas in which the City of Houston and Harris County governments can increase cooperation and streamline efforts, reducing the cost of operations and improving services to the residents of Houston and Harris County.

Alcorn assumed office to represent At-Large Position 5 of the Houston City Council on January 2, 2020, succeeding Jack Christie.

== Personal life ==
She is married to George Alcorn with 4 children, and is a member of St. Michael the Archangel Catholic Church.
