= Houston Public Media =

Houston Public Media operates under the University of Houston System, and may refer to either two licensed stations:

- KUHT, the PBS television member station
- KUHF, the NPR radio member station
