= Briarmeadow, Houston =

Subdivision in Houston, Texas, United States

Coordinates: 29.729°N 95.521°W

Briarmeadow is a subdivision in Houston, Texas, United States.

== History ==
James E. Lyon developed Briarmeadow. A July 10, 1955 article described the beginning of Briarmeadow. At first 258 acres (1.04 km^{2}) straddled Westheimer Road, with 18 acres (73,000 m^{2}) for commercial and retail establishments.

The 1957 Parade of Homes showcased Briarmeadow.

== Education ==
Briarmeadow is within the Houston Independent School District. The community is within Trustee District VII, represented by Harvin C. Moore as of 2008.

Briarmeadow is zoned to:

- Piney Point Elementary School
- Revere Middle School

Briarmeadow residents are zoned to Margaret Long Wisdom High School (formerly Lee High School) and may choose to attend Lamar High School or Westside High School.

Residents of the Piney Point Elementary School attendance zone may apply for the Briarmeadow Charter School (K-8). Named after the Briarmeadow community, it was created in 1997, with 125 students, to relieve Piney Point and three other elementary schools. Briarmeadow Charter at one time rented space at the Post Oak YMCA, with students using an area library and the cafeteria of T.H. Rogers School. It moved into a permanent 11-acre (4.5 ha) facility, with the school building being 90,000-square-foot (8,400 m^{2}) former manufacturing warehouse, with room for 550 pupils, in 2001; the building had a value of $10 million, funded by the Rebuild 2002 bond, and its second floor had 7,000 square feet (650 m^{2}) of space. The classrooms are in groups with a common area linking them. The building's facilities include a cafeteria equipped with a stage and designated for multiple purposes, a fine art studio with a separate entry area and an attached music studio with high-acoustic capabilities, two computer laboratories, a library, a multimedia room, a music studio, two language laboratories, and a science laboratory. Athletic fields, a nature area, and playgrounds use an outdoor area with 11 acres (4.5 ha) of space. HISD had plans to use the second floor as administrative offices. It had 220 students in June 2001, increasing to 350 by September of that year.

Mark White Elementary School was scheduled to open in August 2016. Residents of the Piney Point Elementary zone, along with those of the Briargrove, Pilgrim, and Emerson zones, are allowed to apply to this school.
