= Edward Pollard (politician) =

American politician

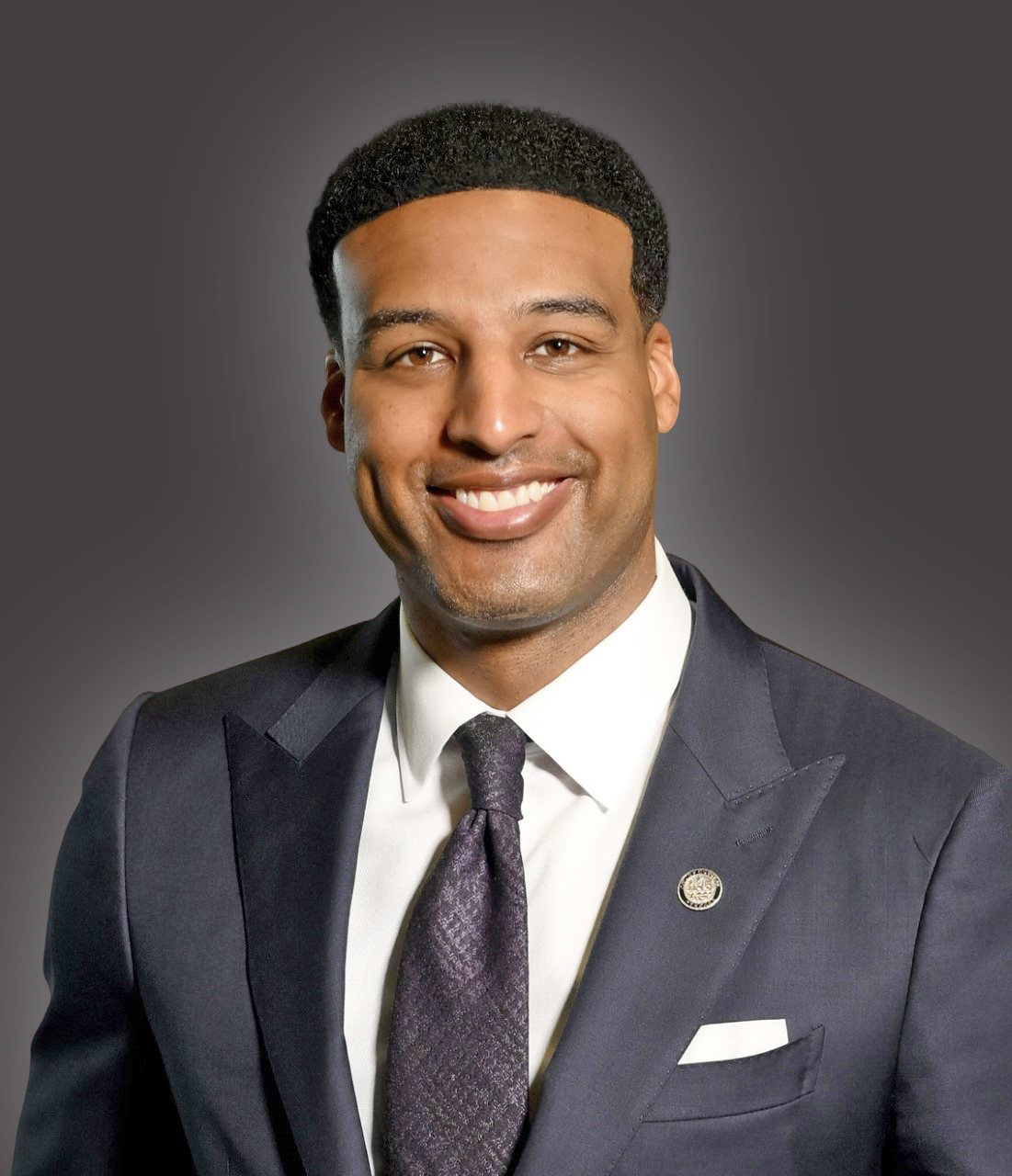

Member of Houston City Council for District J
- Incumbent
- Assumed office January 2, 2020

Personal details
- Born: July 19, 1984 (age 42)
- Party: Democratic
- Children: 2
- Education: Morehouse College (BA); Thurgood Marshall; School of Law (JD); Harvard Business School

Edward Pollard (born July 19, 1984) is a Houston politician that represents District J of the Houston City Council.

== Personal life and education ==
Pollard was born in Southwest Houston, and attended Houston Independent School District schools. He attended Morehouse College in Atlanta, Georgia on a basketball scholarship. He graduated with a bachelor's degree in political science. He played professional basketball internationally in Singapore, Chile, and other South American countries. He then returned to Houston and earned a Juris Doctor from Thurgood Marshall School of Law, and later, from Harvard Business School, received a Certificate in Negotiation Mastery. Pollard is the principal owner of Pollard Legal Group, LLC, which is a civil litigation law firm. Additionally, he founded Suits for Success which is a 501(c)3 organization that helps teenage boys develop life skills. He is member of Antioch Missionary Baptist Church, and has 2 children.

== Political career ==
Pollard is considered to be a centrist or more conservative Democrat. He was sworn in on January 2, 2020 to represent District J of the Houston City Council.
