= Garden Oaks, Houston =

Garden Oaks
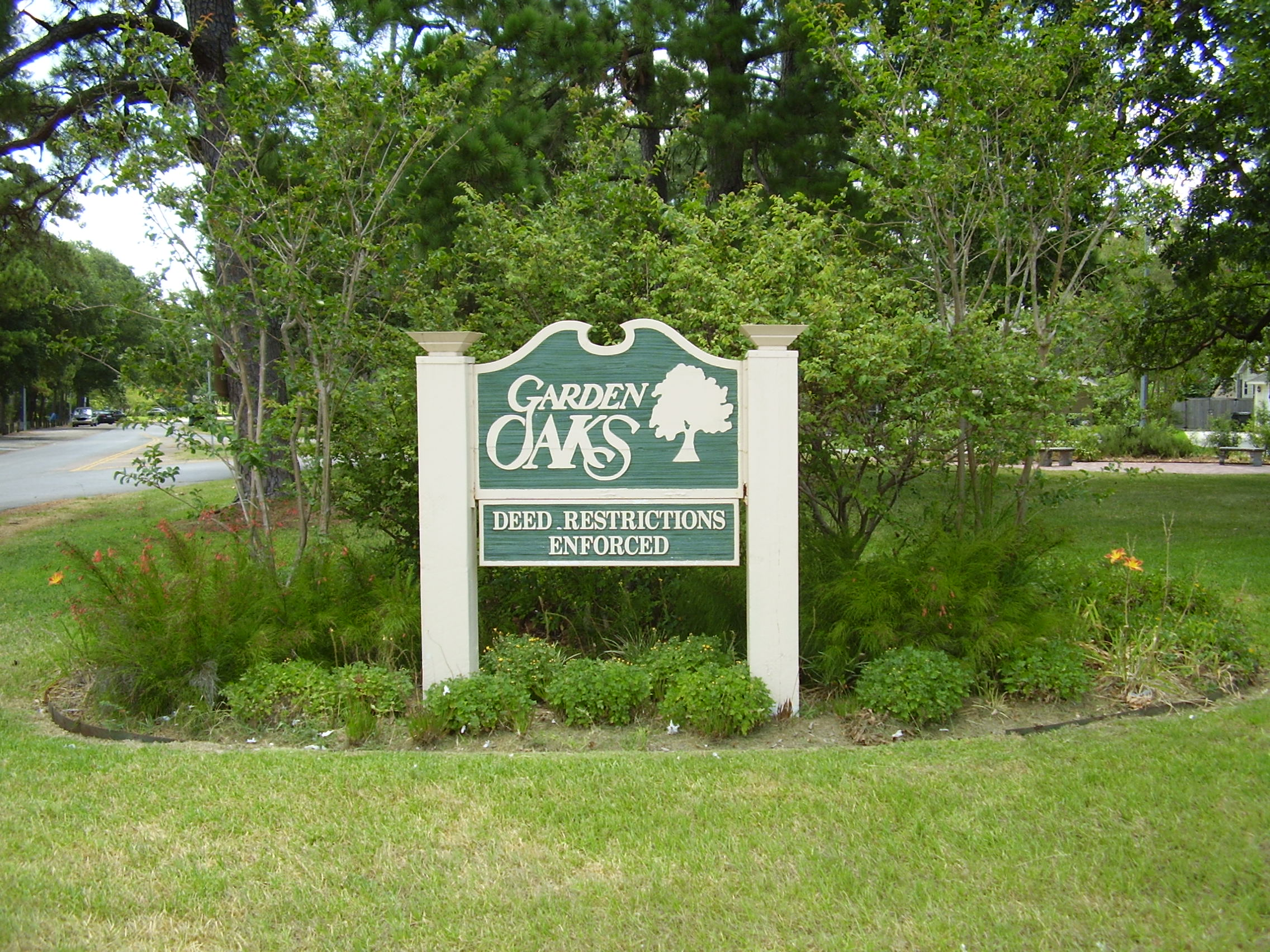
- Country: United States
- State: Texas
- Counties: Harris
- City: Houston
- Area: north Houston
- Elevation: 69 ft (21 m)
- ZIP code: 77018
- Area codes: 281, 713, 832, 346
- Website: http://www.gardenoaks.org/

Garden Oaks is a neighborhood in Houston, Texas (USA). The neighborhood, located north of Houston Heights, was established in 1937 by Edward L. Crain.

Garden Oaks has many oak, pecan, and pine trees in and around the neighborhood. Several types of houses, including ranch-style houses and bungalows, are in the neighborhood.
