= Richard Kinder =

American billionaire businessman (born 1944)

Richard D. Kinder
- Born: October 19, 1944 (age 82); Cape Girardeau, Missouri, US
- Education: University of Missouri (BA, JD)
- Occupation: Businessman
- Title: Executive chairman, Kinder Morgan
- Spouse: Nancy Kinder
- Children: 1

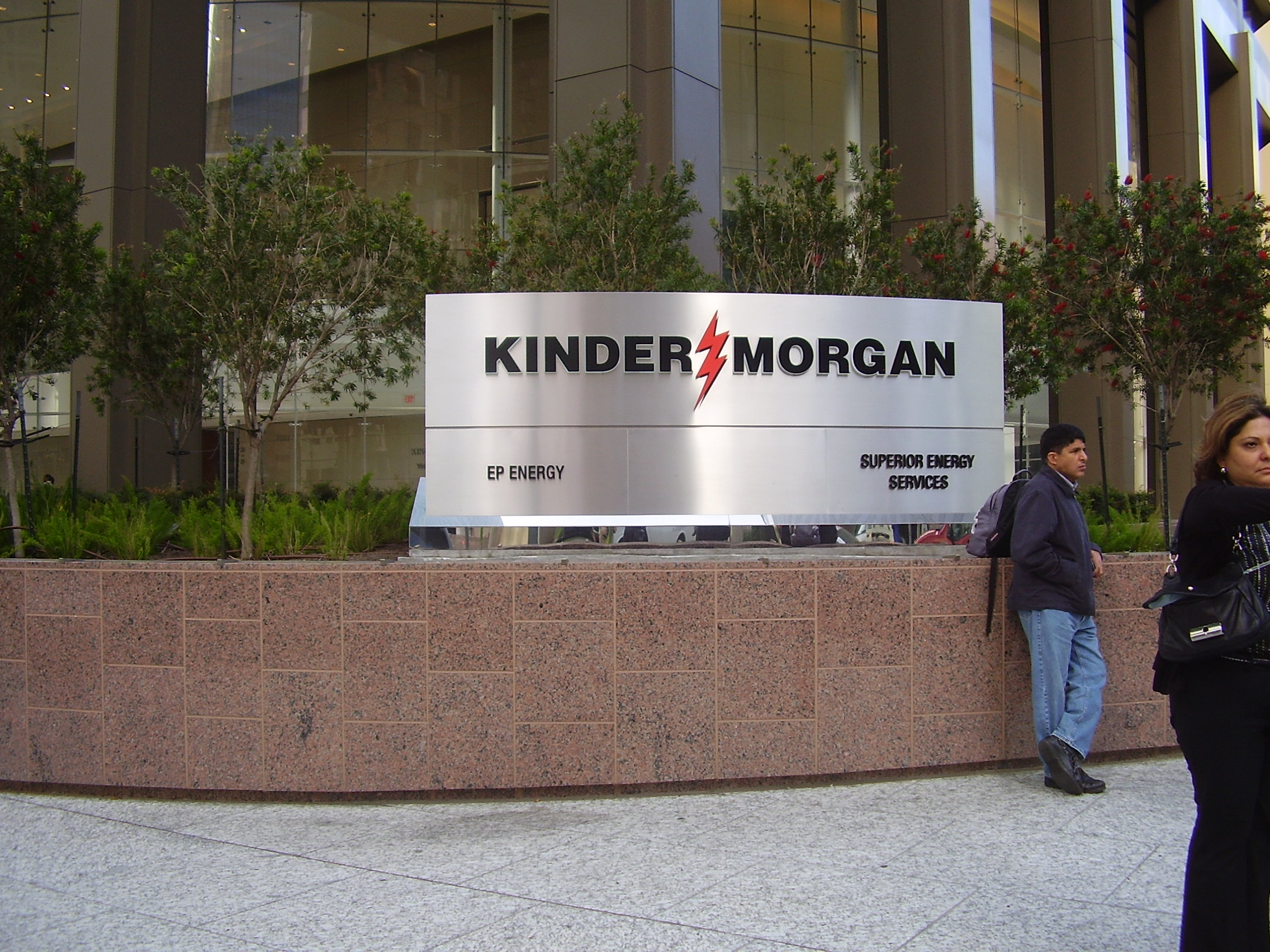
Kinder Morgan Building - 1001 Louisiana St, Houston, Texas

Richard D. Kinder (born October 19, 1944) is an American businessman. He is the co-founder and executive chairman of Kinder Morgan Inc., an energy and pipeline corporation.

== Early life ==
Richard Kinder was born in Cape Girardeau, Missouri, in 1944. He received a BA in 1966 and a JD in 1968, both from the University of Missouri. In college, he was a member of the Sigma Nu fraternity.

== Career ==
He began his career in the energy business as an attorney with Florida Gas Transmission, which eventually became Enron Corporation, after a series of mergers He had been friends with its founder, Kenneth Lay, in college. From 1990 to December 1996, he served as its president and COO. He resigned from Enron in 1996 to start a new pipeline company with college friend William V. Morgan. They purchased Enron Liquids Pipeline for $40 million. They also merged with KN Energy. After a number of acquisitions, the most prominent being El Paso Corporation, Kinder Morgan became the largest midstream energy company in North America.

He is the chairman of the board of trustees of the Museum of Fine Arts, Houston and serves as chairman of the Kinder Foundation. He previously served as a member of the board of Baker Hughes, Transocean and Waste Management, as a national board member of the Smithsonian Institution and is a past chairman of the Interstate Natural Gas Association of America. A Republican, he campaigned for Bush-Quayle in 1992, for Bush-Cheney in 2004, for John McCain in 2008, and for Kay Bailey Hutchison and Tom DeLay.

In 2014, Kinder was listed on Forbes Richest People in the US. Kinder is one of seven self-made billionaires from Houston on the list, with a net worth of $11 billion. In 2025, he was ranked No. 108 on the Forbes 400 list of the richest people in America.

== Personal life ==
He is twice married, with one child from his first marriage. His divorce was in 1996, the same year he left Enron. He married Nancy McNeil in September 1997. Prior to leaving Enron in 1996, McNeil was Ken Lay's assistant and was a member of Rudy Giuliani's presidential committee from 2007 to 2008. He lives in Houston, Texas.

== Kinder Foundation ==
The Kinders founded the Kinder Foundation in an effort to support Greater Houston as a model city for economic and quality of life by providing transformation grants in the areas of urban green space, education and quality of life. As of December 2024, Kinder Foundation has committed over $850 million in grants.

=== Quality of Life ===
Through the foundation, the Kinders donated $15 million to Rice University in 2010 to support and rename the Kinder Institute for Urban Research, formerly Rice's Institute for Urban Research. In 2022, the Kinder Foundation granted Rice another $50 million to expand the Kinder Institute's work to solve challenges facing Houston.

In October 2013, it was announced that the foundation would give $50 million to the Houston Parks Board for the Bayou Greenways 2020 Project, which connects greenspaces along Houston's bayous and creates parkland.

In January 2015, the Museum of Fine Arts, Houston announced a $50 million gift from the Kinder Foundation for the redevelopment of the museum's 14-acre campus. In 2018, the Kinder Foundation gave an additional $25 million challenge grant to complete the capital campaign goal of $450 million. In November 2020, the museum's new Nancy and Rich Kinder Building for modern and contemporary art opened to the public.

The Kinder Foundation actively supports the community development and preservation of Houston's historic Third Ward. It provided $750,000 for the Emancipation Park Conservancy's rededication of Emancipation Park in 2016, $2 million in 2018 to PRH Preservation, Inc. to maintain and enhance existing buildings in the Third Ward to ensure safe, affordable housing for residents, and $1.5 million to the Law Harrington Senior Living Center in July 2019 to establish an affordable independent living center for LGBTQ-affirming seniors in the Third Ward, among other gifts to Third Ward organizations.

In the aftermath of Hurricane Harvey in 2017, the foundation contributed nearly $3 million to disaster relief efforts including to the United Way of Greater Houston Relief Fund, the Greater Houston Community Foundation, and also to employee relief funds to help those in Houston most impacted by the hurricane's devastating effects.

The Kinder Foundation contributed more than $3.5 million to Houston's COVID-19 relief efforts, including $1 million to the Houston Food Bank in April 2020 and $1 million to the City of Houston's second rental assistance package.

In May 2025, Texas Children's Hospital and MD Anderson Cancer Center announced a $150 million gift from the Kinder Foundation to support the launch of Kinder Children's Cancer Center.

=== Urban Greenspace ===
Along with several other Houston philanthropies, the Kinder Foundation founded Discovery Green, downtown Houston's notable 12-acre park, in 2008. The philanthropists approached then-Mayor Bill White with an idea to acquire the Houston Center Gardens adjacent to downtown's George R. Brown Convention Center property and create a permanent downtown greenspace and public park. The Kinder Foundation contributed an initial $10 million for the park's creation.

In 2010, the Kinder Foundation approached the Buffalo Bayou Partnership with a catalyst grant of $30 million of the $58 million needed for improvements to the existing 160-acre, 2.3 mile stretch of Buffalo Bayou from Shepherd Drive to Sabine Street. In 2015, Buffalo Bayou Park's enhancements were complete. In September 2022, the Kinder Foundation granted $100 million to the Buffalo Bayou Partnership for Buffalo Bayou East, a 10-year, $310 million project to expand Buffalo Bayou Park from downtown to Houston's East End.

To accelerate implementation of the visionary Memorial Park Master Plan, the Kinder Foundation offered a grant of $70 million to the Memorial Park Conservancy in April 2018. In February 2023, the Memorial Park Conservancy completed the Kinder Land Bridge, a 100-acre area built over several lanes of traffic underneath the park, named in the Kinders' honor. In April 2025, Memorial Park Conservancy announced Kinder Foundation granted $10 million toward Memorial Groves, a project that will honor the original vision of the park as a greenspace that pays tribute to Houston’s World War I history, along with new recreational amenities and parking for everyday park users.

In December 2023, Kinder Foundation gave $27 million to an effort by the Houston Parks Board to renovate MacGregor Park.

=== Education ===
A $25 million grant from the Kinder Foundation to the University of Missouri in October 2015 went to establish the university's Kinder Institute on Constitutional Democracy. In November 2019, the foundation granted an additional $10 million to support new degree opportunities for undergraduate and graduate students at the Kinder Institute on Constitutional Democracy and the College of Arts and Science. The Kinder Foundation gave an additional $25 million in November 2022 to expand faculty and popular program offerings, bringing the total philanthropy from Rich and Nancy Kinder and the foundation to $60 million.

== Political activities ==
In 2015, Kinder and his wife Nancy donated $2 million to a Super PAC supporting Republican presidential candidate Jeb Bush.

The Kinders are major donors to the Texas Republican Party, and in 2019 alone gave a total of $250,000 to current Texas Governor Greg Abbott.
