= Kinder High School for the Performing and Visual Arts =

Public arts magnet high school in Texas, U.S.

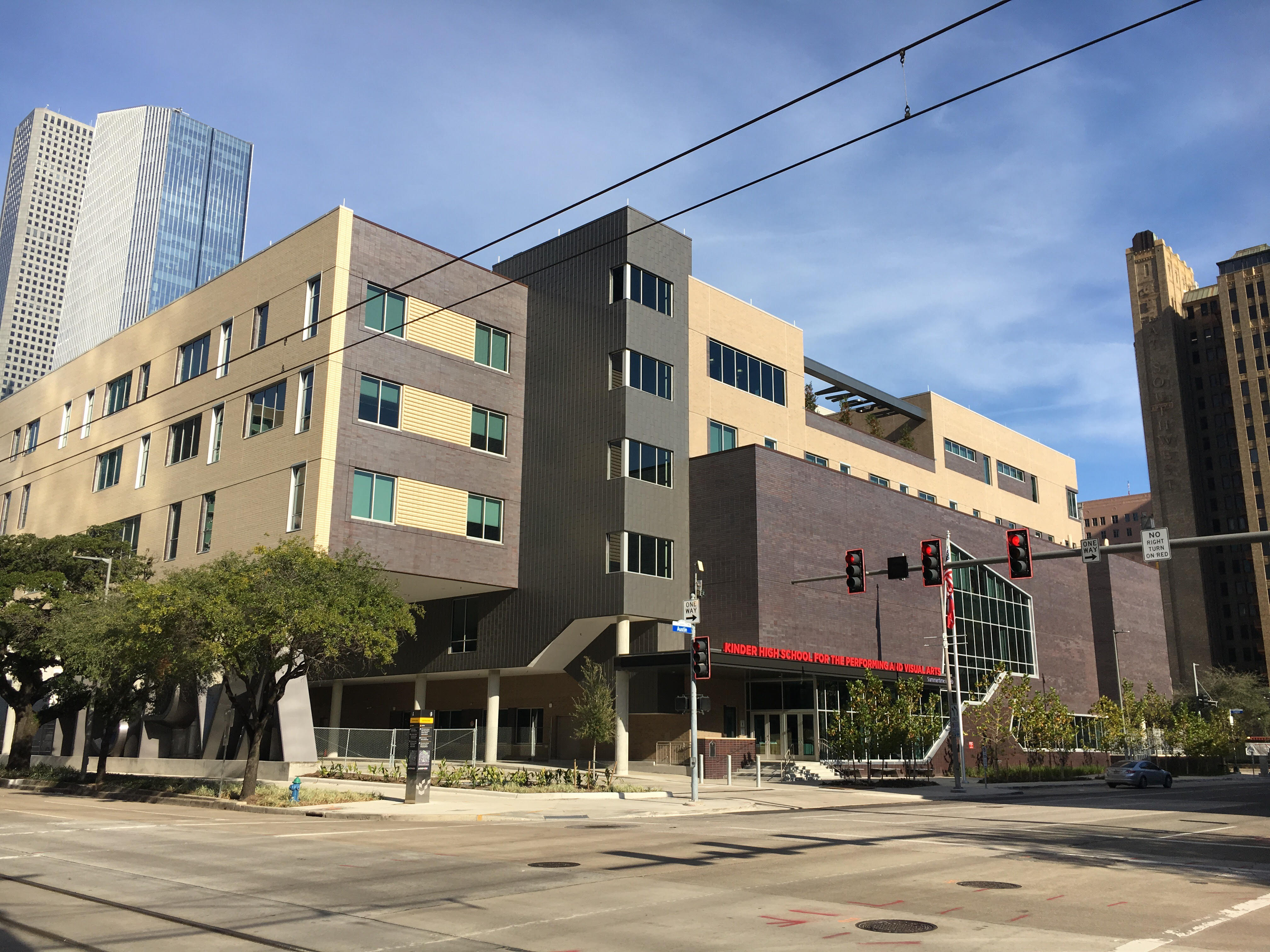
- New downtown HSPVA campus

Location
- 790 Austin Street, Houston, TX 77002; Houston, Texas; United States; 29.75686°N 95.36022°W

Information
- Type: Public Arts Magnet High School
- Established: 1971
- School district: Houston Independent School District
- Principal: Dr. Priscilla Rivas
- Grades: 9-12
- Enrollment: 782 https://www.usnews.com/education/best-high-schools/texas/districts/houston-independent-school-district/kinder-high-school-for-performing-and-visual-arts-19243
- Website: khspva.houstonisd.org

Kinder High School for the Performing and Visual Arts (Kinder HSPVA, HSPVA or PVA) is a secondary school located at 790 Austin Street in the downtown district of Houston, Texas. The school is a part of the Houston Independent School District.

The school provides education for grades nine through twelve. The school is divided into six departments: instrumental music, vocal music, dance, theater (including technical theater), visual arts, and creative writing.

HSPVA was placed as the top school in the Greater Houston Area by Children at Risk's 2009 annual ranking of high schools, and it has continued to be ranked as an "A" grade or higher by Children at Risk. Since 2003, HSPVA has had eight students named US Presidential Scholars in the Arts (Presidential Scholars Program) by the US Department of Education as selected by the National YoungArts Foundation (YoungArts).

As a Magnet school, HSPVA does not automatically enroll students from the surrounding neighborhood; the surrounding neighborhood is zoned to Northside High School.

== Art areas ==
There are six art areas: vocal music, instrumental music, dance, theatre, visual art, and creative writing. There are subdivisions within some of these art areas. Instrumental Music breaks down into band, orchestra, jazz, mariachi, and piano. Theatre breaks down into musical theatre, acting, and technical theatre.

== History ==
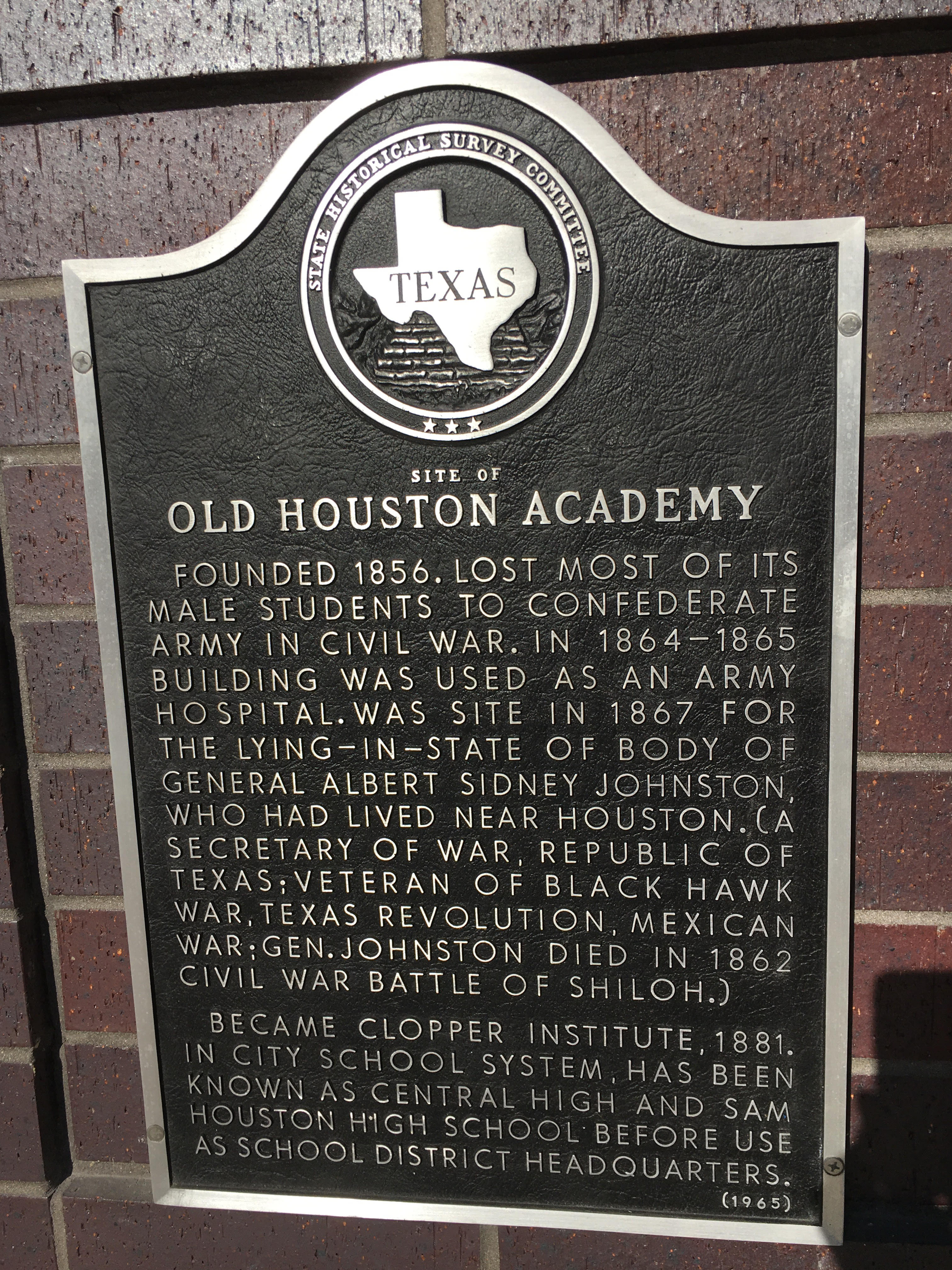
Plaque located at 790 Austin Street detailing history of the new campus site.

HSPVA was established in 1971.

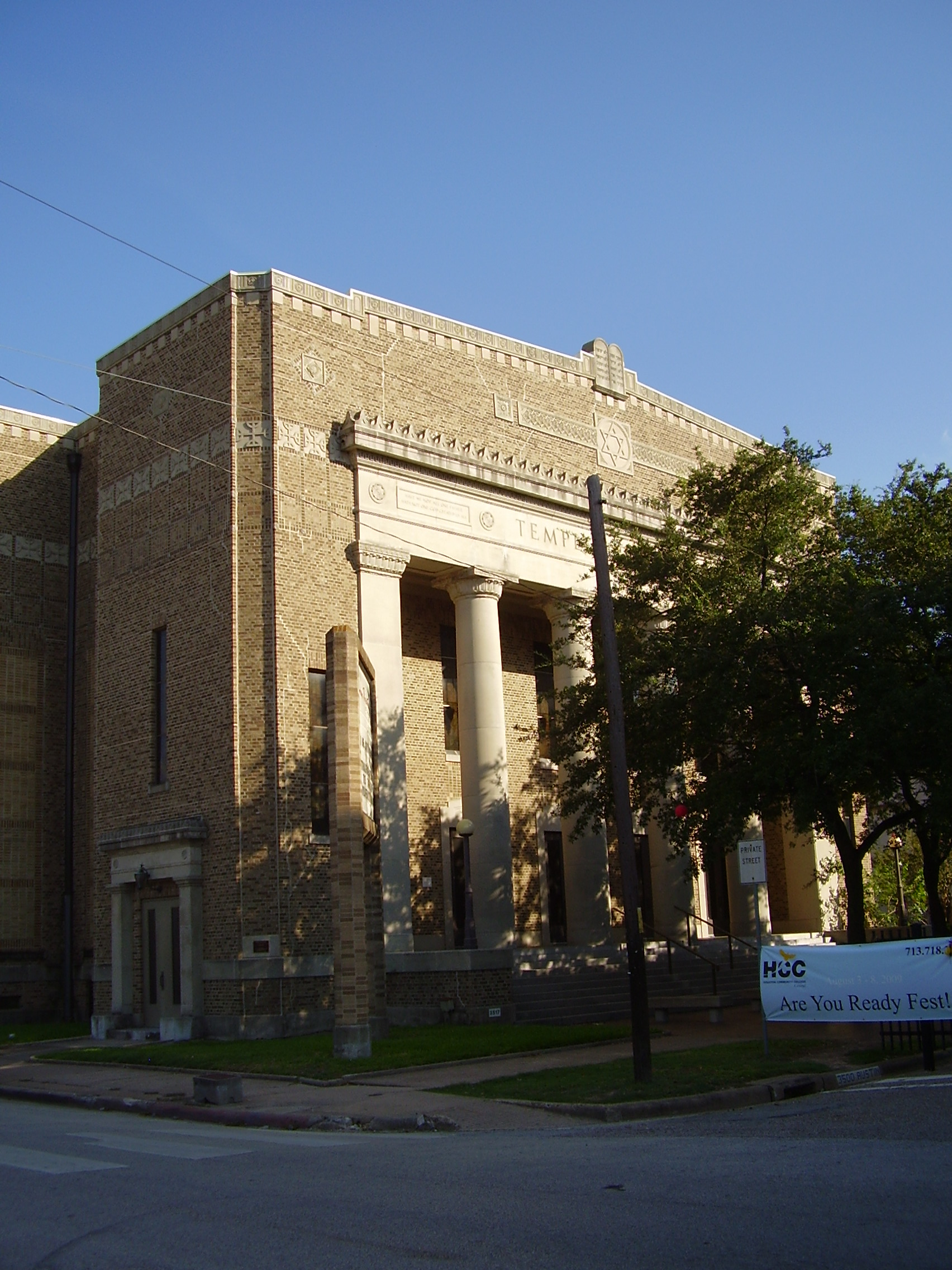
The school was established in the former Temple Beth Israel

HISD chose Ruth Denney as the school's founding director. The district asked Denney to choose between three potential sites: W. D. Cleveland Elementary School, Montrose Elementary School, and the former Temple Beth Israel building. After touring them, Denney selected the temple building and in May 1971 the final plans for HSPVA were presented to the school board.

Parents rallied against a planned move to Timbergrove Manor due to its lack of proximity to Downtown Houston, artist landmarks, and the Houston Museum District, even though the district had already paid $500,000 for planning as of 1979. The school moved to 4001 Stanford Street, the site of the former Montrose Elementary School, in 1982. The cost was $1.3 million, and the HISD board had given the green light to the move the previous year. Keith Plocek of the Houston Press wrote that partly due to the 9th grade being reassigned to the high school level in 1981, "The building on Stanford Street was overcrowded from the get-go" as the facility was only intended for grades 10-12. The HSPVA Friends booster club stated an intention to raise funds to recoup the money used for the Timbergrove site planning; according to the group, the district and HSPVA Friends had conflicting interpretations of their accord in the said recouping, and Plocek stated "The Friends never really paid much of the bill".

By the late 1990s parents advocated for another move due to overpopulation, but again rejected the idea of the Timbergrove site due to the lack of proximity. In the 1990s, there was a proposal to move HSPVA to the Bob R. Casey Federal Building in Downtown Houston. HISD later proposed moving the school near the Gregory-Lincoln Education Center in Houston's Freedmen's Town Historical District in the Fourth Ward. HISD officials agreed to pursue a relocation at that time as Friends of HSPVA agreed to raise about 50% of a projected $30 million cost to develop a new site; otherwise HISD officials were reluctant to promote building a new HSPVA when there were schools with campuses in much worse repair.

The Fourth Ward building would have included a 2000+ seat state-of-the-art theater, updated facilities and possibly a recording studio. Construction was temporarily delayed due to the discovery of a possible American Civil War-era cemetery. In June 2007, the project page for the building displayed "CANCELLED." The site that was to have the new HSPVA instead has the new Carnegie Vanguard High School.

=== Naming discussion ===
On October 13, 2016, the Houston Independent School District Board of Trustees voted 7 to 2 to accept a naming rights contract from the Kinder Foundation for a $7.5 million for capital improvements to the new facility. The school's name was to become Kinder High School for the Performing and Visual Arts when the school moved to the new downtown location. The Kinder funds provide primarily upgrades to theater equipment and some performance spaces, such as outfitting the mini-theater.

The contract was approved by the school board after the Kinder Foundation said it would withdraw the funds if the board did not vote, six days after the public announcement of the deal.

One HISD board member, Jolanda Jones, spoke against the deal, arguing that it was selling out the rights to name a school and that HISD was not giving attention to the non-specialty schools in the district. Jones and Diana Davila were the only board members to vote against the deal. Most speakers at the board meeting, including community members and HSPVA students and parents, supported the deal (17 speakers in favor, 11 against).

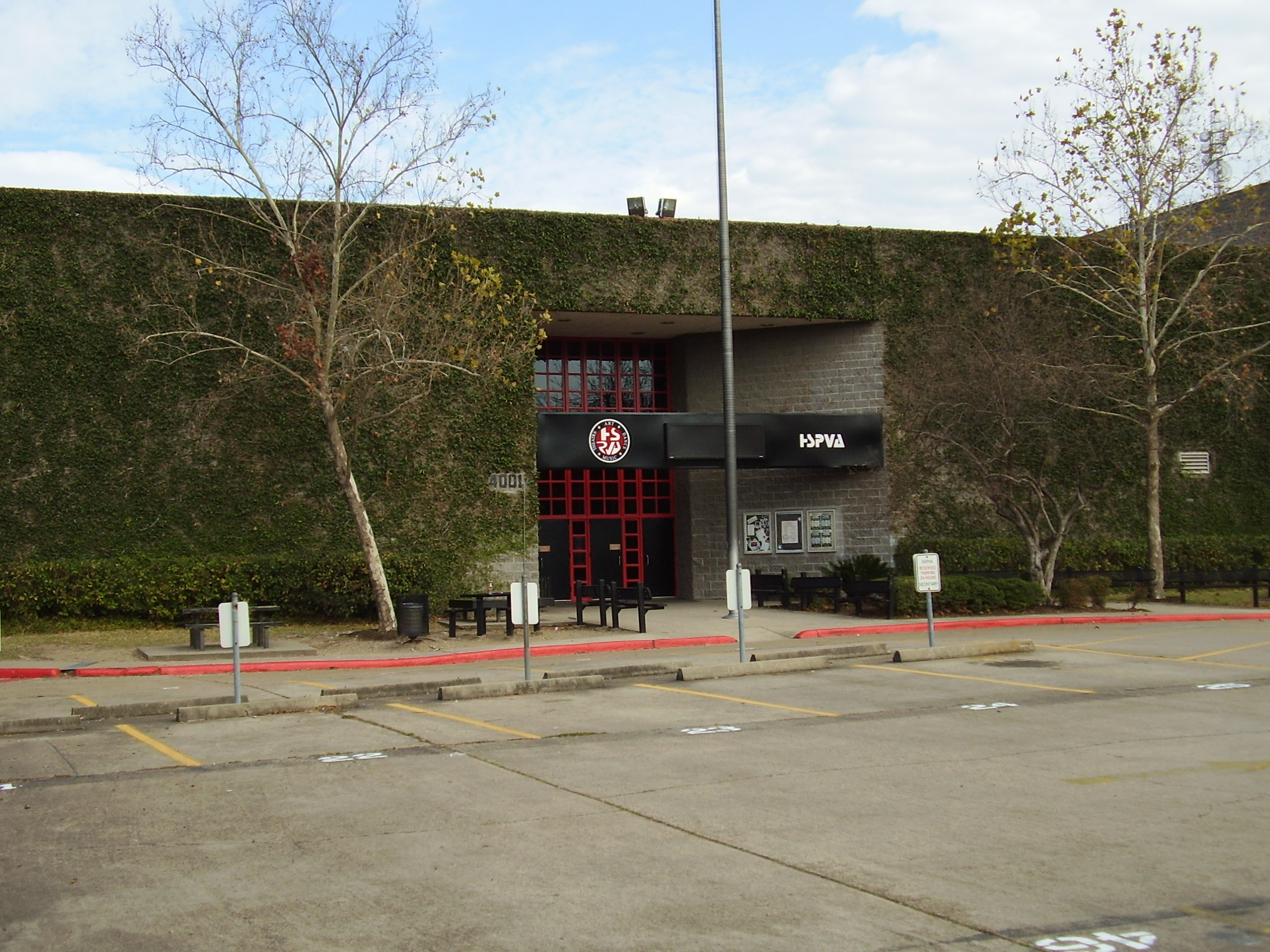
Former Montrose campus

In April 2017, in response to a petition asking the Kinders to give the name back, Richard Kinder wrote to the superintendent of Houston Independent School District. Citing negative controversy, he offered to release the naming rights, but did not suggest or request the school's name be restored. By contract, the name change became effective when the new downtown campus was occupied.

=== New campus ===
In January 2019, HSPVA moved from its Montrose campus to the downtown site at 790 Austin Street. The former campus now houses the Arabic Immersion Magnet School.

== Demographics ==
The demographics for the 2017 - 2018 school year are listed below.

Race/Ethnicity	2016-2017
African American	18%
American Indian	<1 %
Asian/Pac. Islander	9%
Hispanic	26%
White	45%
Two or More	3%

As of 2017 Anglo white students made up less than 50% of the student body, and the three ZIP codes with the highest numbers of students in HSPVA included Meyerland, Montrose, and the West University areas. The HSPVA student body had a higher percentage of Anglo white students than that of HISD as a whole. That year 15% of the students were low income. HSPVA historically had higher rates of minority enrollment as it had affirmative action policies, but these policies were withdrawn after 1997.

== Campus ==
A block in Downtown Houston is the new location for HSPVA. It formerly housed Sam Houston High School; at a later point the building housed the HISD headquarters. The building is five stories and 168,000 square feet (15,600 m^{2}) in size, at a cost of $88.4 million. Gensler Architects designed the building. Groundbreaking occurred on December 14, 2014.

The previous campus was on Blocks 12 and 13 of the Lockard Connor and Barziza Addition, in Montrose. As of 2014, many students practiced their creative arts in the school hallway due to the small size of the campus. Many Montrose-area residents attended performances even though they do not have children enrolled in the school. Students sometimes traveled to area cafes and restaurants after the official end of the school day but before additional rehearsals.

== Admissions patterns ==
HSPVA has no actual feeder patterns. Since it is a magnet school it takes students from all over HISD, and from districts outside of HISD.

HSPVA takes students from many HISD middle schools. In addition, some students who are enrolled in private schools in the 8th grade, such as St. Mark's Episcopal School, Presbyterian School, River Oaks Baptist School, John Paul II School, and Annunciation Orthodox School, choose to go to HSPVA for high school.

== Notable alumni ==
- Jay Alexander (magician mentalist)
- Lisa Hartman Black (actress)
- Kevin Cahoon (Broadway Performer)
- Susan Choi (novelist)
- Tamarie Cooper (Playwright and Performer)
- Bryan-Michael Cox (Grammy Award-winning songwriter/record producer)
- Sapphira Cristál (Drag queen)
- Irene the Alien (Drag queen)
- Chris Dave (drummer)
- Tamar Davis (singer and actress)
- Ryan Delahoussaye (member of the rock band Blue October)
- Adam J. Elkhadem (Cartoonist)
- Mireille Enos (Actress)
- Major R. Johnson Finley ("MAJOR.")
- Michelle Forbes (Actress)
- James Francies (pianist and keyboardist)
- K. Todd Freeman (Stage Actor)
- Justin Furstenfeld (frontman of the rock band "Blue October")
- Robert Glasper (Grammy Award-winning Jazz Musician)
- Bianna Golodryga (TV journalist)
- John Gremillion (voice actor in anime films)
- Tim Guinee (Actor)
- Eric Harland (Jazz Drummer)
- Everette Harp (Jazz musician)
- Sara Hickman (Singer and songwriter)
- Robert Leroy Hodge (Multidisciplinary artist)
- Lance Hosey (Award-winning architect and author)
- Cheryl Kelley (Photorealist painter)
- Autumn Knight (interdisciplinary artist)
- Beyoncé Knowles (Grammy Award-winning
- LeToya Luckett (Grammy Award-winning musician)
- Ralphie May (Comedian)
- Adam Mayfield (Actor)
- Margarita Monet (founder of the band Edge Of Paradise)
- DeQuina Moore (Broadway Actress, Singer, Dancer)
- Jason Moran (jazz musician)
- Mike Moreno Jazz Guitarist
- Carli Mosier (Voice actress)
- Matt Mullenweg (Co-founder of WordPress)
- Renee O'Connor (Actress)
- Lovie Olivia (Multidisciplinary artist)
- Mark Payne (Emmy Award-winning makeup artist)
- Esteban Powell (Actor)
- Antoinette Roberson (Songwriter, producer, educator)
- Kendrick Scott (Jazz musician)
- Ronen Segev (Classical Pianist)
- Mark Seliger (Photographer)
- Olly Sholotan (Actor & musician)
- Justin Simien (Filmmaker, Writer)
- Walter Smith III, (Jazz composer and saxophonist)
- Helen Sung (Professional musician)
- Leron Thomas (multi-genre composer, Jazz musician, vocalist, rapper)
- Devyn Tyler (Actress)
- Chris Walker (R&B Singer)
- Chandra Wilson (Emmy nominated Actress)
- Harris Wittels (Comedian, writer)
- Camille Zamora (Opera singer)
- Gwendolyn Zepeda (Poet)
