= TMCC =

TMCC may refer to:

- Tainan Municipal Cultural Center, a cultural center in Tainan, Taiwan
- Timbergrove Manor Civic Club of Timbergrove Manor, Houston
- Trainmaster Command Control, an electronic control system for model trains
- Truckee Meadows Community College
