= Robert Leroy Hodge =

American artist (born 1979)

- Born: 1979 (age 46–47); Houston, Texas
- Education: Kinder High School for the Performing and Visual Arts Pratt Institute Atlanta College of Art
- Occupation: Artist
- Style: Multidisciplinary and interdisciplinary art
- Awards: Champions of Local Artists Award Artadia Award
- Website: www.robertleroyhodge.com

Robert Leroy Hodge (born 1979) is an American multidisciplinary artist based in Houston, Texas. He attended three art schools starting in high school and ending in his undergraduate college career.

== Works ==
Hodge's art works portray modern racial relations and the struggle of Black Americans in the US through his art works. As well as being an artist, he is a music producer.

In 2013, he formed a duo with another artist, Phillip Pyle II, known as the "Black Guys" as an alternative to another Houston art duo, the "Art Guys". He and Pyle also created the "Beauty Box", which was a revamp of an abandoned space, turning into an event hosting space.

Hodge has several works that rotate between exhibitions and museums. Some of his notable works include DJ Screw Forever, Stand Your Ground and the Destroy and Rebuild series at the Contemporary Arts Museum of Houston; No Kings But Us and Grand Theft at the Blaffer Art Museum; The Sanofka Project at the Lawndale Art Center; Diamonds That Fall from the Treetop at SANMAN Studios.

He's also had works in Station Museum of Contemporary Art; the Museum of Fine Arts, Houston; the Young Masters Exhibition, London; Centre Georges Pompidou; the Nairobi Contemporary Art Institute; the Virginia Museum of Fine Arts, Artpace; Baltimore Museum of Art; and the Carnegie Museum of Art.
