= Lovie Olivia =

American artist

- Born: Lovie Olivia Nolan; Houston, Texas
- Education: Kinder High School for the Performing and Visual Arts
- Style: Contemporary; Installation art; Printmaking
- Awards: Houston Arts Alliance Individual Artist Grant 2009 Houston Arts Alliance Individual Artist Grant 2014
- Website: www.lovieolivia.com

Lovie Olivia (born Lovie Olivia Nolan) is an American multidisciplinary visual artist. She uses the media of printmaking, painting, and installations to explore themes of gender, sexuality, race, class and power.

== Early life and education ==
Olivia is a native of Houston, Texas and attended Kinder High School for the Performing and Visual Arts (HSPVA).

== Work ==
As a multidisciplinary artist, Olivia works across various media including printmaking, painting, fresco, digital and graphic design, and audiovisual and sculptural installation. She frequently works on large wood panels covered in multiple layers of plaster which are manipulated and completed with fresco paintings. Olivia's work revolves around a number of interrelated issues important for a number underrepresented communities that all connect back to her own identity and life experience under the labeled categories of: "Female, Black, Gay, etc." The press release for Olivia's 2010 solo exhibition Thrice Removed at Spacetaker ARC Gallery in Houston, Texas, characterized the show as:

A play on the phrase “twice removed” denoting familial relations through a system of “removals,” Olivia re-contextualizes this terminology to imply separation from African traditions and customs, male authority, and heterosexual privilege in this new solo show. Her work explores the multi-dimensionality of women of African Diaspora in light of the challenges and joy associated with a hybridized presence. Part autobiographical-part objective, Olivia zeroes in on the complex histories of racism, sexism, and classism in America, which intersect for ‘thrice’ the barrier to equal opportunity. Her exhibition, influenced by recorded conversations, video footage, folklore, and ancestral documents, redefines these selves outside conventional depictions in a celebration of identity.

== Career ==
Olivia is the recipient of the Individual Artist Grant Award 2009 and 2014 offered by Houston Arts Alliance and funded by the City of Houston. In 2018, she was on a panel assembled by the City of Houston to select artists to create 40 new mini-murals for the city. In 2025 Olivia a Houston Artadia Awardee receiving $15,000 in unrestricted funds to support her artistic practice. She is a member of the ROUX artist collective alongside Ann Johnson, Rabéa Ballin, and Delita Martin. She has participated in exhibitions, including:

- 2023 - Tinney Contemporary Art Gallery, Nashville, Tennessee
- 2023 - Frist Museum, Nashville, Tennessee
- 2023 - ART IS BOND., Houston, Texas
- 2020 - 9, Civic TV, Houston, Texas
- 2019 - The Wright Gallery in the College of Architecture at Texas A&M University, College Station, Texas
- 2019 - ACRE Projects, Chicago, Illinois
- 2019 - Presa House Gallery, San Antonio
- 2018 - Lawndale Art Center, Houston, Texas
- 2017 - Woman Made Gallery, Chicago, Illinois
- 2017 - Corridor Gallery, Brooklyn, New York
- 2017 - Galveston Arts Center(as ROUX), Galveston, Texas
- 2017 - Art League Houston (as ROUX), Houston, Texas
- 2016 - Vanderbilt University, Nashville, Tennessee
- 2016 - Station Museum of Contemporary Art, Houston, Texas
- 2015 - Art League Houston, Texas
- 2015 - University Museum at Texas Southern University (as ROUX), Houston, Texas
- 2014 - Project Row Houses, Houston, Texas
- 2013 - Art League Houston, Texas
- 2013 - University Museum at Texas Southern University, Houston, Texas
- 2012 - Gallery M Squared, Houston, Texas
- 2011 - Houston Museum of African American Culture, Houston, Texas
- 2010 - Spacetaker Artist Resource Center, Houston, Texas
