= Delita Martin =

American artist

- Born: 1972 (age 53–54); Conroe, Texas
- Education: Texas Southern University (BFA); Purdue University (MFA)
- Known for: Printmaking, mixed media
- Website: blackboxpressstudio.com

Delita Martin (born 1972) is an American multimedia artist based in Huffman, Texas.

== Early life and education ==
Delita Martin was born in 1972 in Conroe, Texas. She attended Texas Southern University in Houston, receiving a BFA in drawing in 2002. She then earned her MFA in printmaking from Purdue University in 2009. She taught at University of Arkansas at Little Rock.

Martin has stated that she knew she wanted to be an artist since she was five years old as she was exposed to art through her father's work as a carpenter and painter.

== Career ==
As a multidisciplinary artist, Martin works across various techniques including printmaking, painting and stitching which incorporates indigenous and modern art-making. Martin uses storytelling to provide a platform for Black women who have often been marginalized. She frequently uses symbolism such as moons to represent women and birds to represent the human spirit. Many of her works contain West African masks which highlight the connection between the mortal and spiritual world. Martin's influences include Elizabeth Catlett, whose work she was introduced to as an undergraduate student. Delita is also inspired by the African aesthetics she has learned exists throughout Black culture.

Martin had her first show at the Community Artists' Collective and was an education coordinator for the nonprofit. She later founded her own studio, Black Box Press, in 2008. She was a lecturer at the University of Arkansas at Little Rock in the Fine Arts department from 2008 to 2012. Her work has been shown in the Havana Biennial and in Art Basel Miami. She is a founding member of Black Women of Print, a printmaking collective for Black women which was founded in 2018. She is also a member of the ROUX artist collective alongside Ann Johnson, Rabéa Ballin, and Lovie Olivia. Delita has been featured as a black woman artist to have on your radar by Marie Claire. She was a juror for “The Contemporary Print: 5×5,” at PrintAustin.

Permanent collections of Delita Martin's works are held by National Museum of Women in the Arts, Salamander Resort, Minneapolis Institute of Art, Bradbury Art Museum, C.N. Gorman Museum, Crystal Bridges Museum of American Art, David C. Driskell Center, Petrucci Family Foundation Collection of African American-Art, Studio Museum in Harlem, Thrivent Financial, William J. Clinton Presidential Library and Museum, US Embassy (Mauritania), Muscarelle Museum of Art, and the Georgetown University Art Collection and more.

== Awards ==
- Bruce J. and Sharon Goodman Merit Award (2006)
- Telly Award (2010)
- Barbara Deming Emerging Voices Award (2011)

== Exhibitions ==
- 2017 They Cried I Am, Gallery 221, Tampa, FL
- 2017 Two Skins,y Art Museum, Arkansas State University, Jonesboro, AR
- 2017 Black Birds in the Night Sky, Gallery 221, Hillsborough Community College, Tampa, FL
- 2017 Constellations, Stella Jones Gallery, New Orleans, LA
- 2017 I Come from Women Who Could Fly, Ohr-O'Keefe Museum Of Art, Biloxi, MS
- 2017 Night Women, Annesdale Park Gallery, Memphis, TN
- 2017 Night Women, Bradbury Art Museum, Arkansas State University, Jonesboro, AR
- 2018 The Dinner Table, Art Gallery, Houston TX (June–July 2018)
- 2018 Between Sisters and Spirits, Nicole Longnecker Gallery, Houston, TX (January 2018)
- 2018 Between Sisters and Spirits, Galerie Myrtis, Baltimore, MD (November 2018–February 2019)
- 2019 Shadows in the Gardens, Stella Jones Gallery, New Orleans, LA (April–May 2019)
- 2019 Mapping Black Identities, Minneapolis Institute of Art, Minneapolis, MN (February 2019 - September 2020)
- 2019, [Un]Common Collections: Selections from Fifteen Collectors, David C. Driskill Center, College Park, MD (September 2019-November 2019)
- 2020 Calling Down the Spirits, National Museum of Women in the Arts, Washington, DC (January 2020–April 2020)
- 2021 Conjure, Art Museum of Southeast Texas (March 13, 2021 – May 23, 2021)

== Publications ==
- 2013 Patton, Venetria. The Grasp that Reaches Beyond the Grave. (cover art)
- 2015 Spencer‐Stonestree, Tracy. "Artists to Watch." The International Review for African American Art, Vol. 25, No. 3, Hampton University Museum.
- 2016 Oxford American Magazine, Issue 95, Winter 2016.
- 2017 The Black Scholar, Volume 47, Issue 4, Winter. (cover art)
- 2018 Word, Tanekeya. "Black Womanhood & The Creative Process." Pressing Matters Magazine, Issue 03, Print Communications, United Kingdom.
- 2020 Wicked Flesh: Black Women, Intimacy, and Freedom in the Atlantic World. (cover art)
- 2020 "The Blessing and Burden of Forever" Oxford American Magazine, Issue 109/110, Fall 2020,
