= Edge of Paradise =

American rock band from Los Angeles, United States

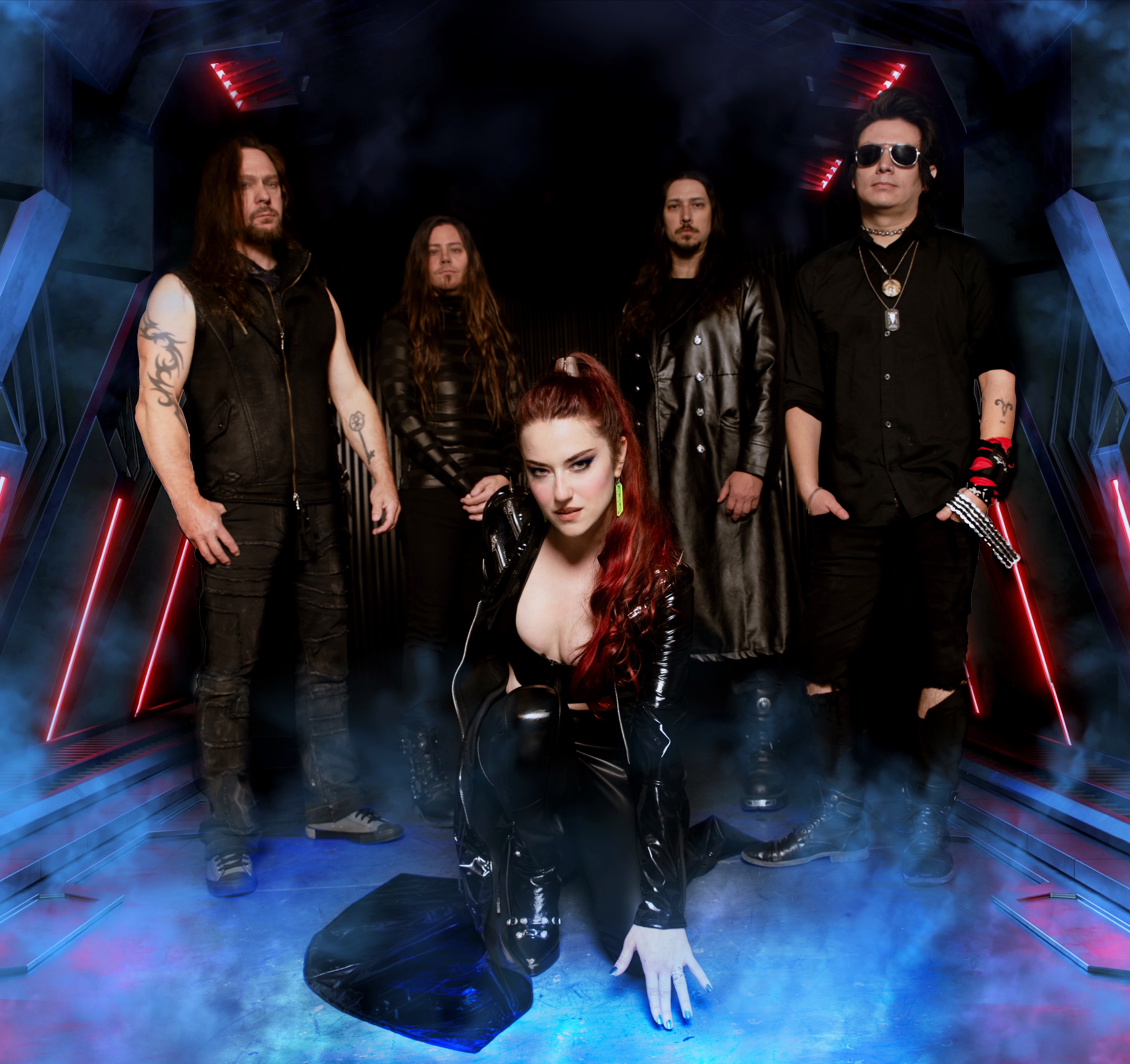

Background information
- Origin: Los Angeles, California, U.S.
- Genres: Hard rock; heavy metal; industrial metal; symphonic metal
- Years active: 2011–present
- Labels: Napalm, Frontiers
- Members: Margarita Monet; Dave Bates; Doug Weiand; Jamie Moreno; Kenny Lockwood
- Past members: Nick Ericson; John Chominsky; Kevin Katich; Gene McEwen; Kurt Schaeffer; Steven Cook; Ricky Bonazza; Vanya Kapetanovic; Jimmy Lee; David Ruiz
- Website: edgeofparadiseband.com

Edge of Paradise is an American rock band that was formed in Los Angeles, California, United States, in 2011. The band currently consists of Margarita Monet (vocals/keys), Dave Bates (guitars), Doug Weiand (guitars), Jamie Moreno (drums) and Kenny Lockwood (bass). The band is known for its heavy guitars complemented by industrial and classical influences, as well as Monet's large vocal range. In 2012, Monet was featured in Metalholic’s "Top 25 Women in Hard Rock and Metal."

== History ==
The band was formed in 2011 after Margarita Monet met guitarist Dave Bates on a freelance project. At the time, Bates was part of a band called "Bleed" with singer Robin McAuley, bassist Tony Franklin, and drummer Gregg Bissonette. Edge of Paradise reworked Bates' unreleased songs and included them in the band's debut album.

The debut album, Mask, was released on September 15, 2011 by Melrose Music Studios. It features a rhythm section consisting of Gregg Bissonette on drums and Tony Franklin on bass.

Edge of Paradise's second album, Immortal Waltz, was released on May 22, 2015 via Pure Steel Records and Soulfood. The album was produced and mixed by Michael Wagener, the album cover art was created by Timo Wuerz, and the music videos for the singles "In a Dream" and "Rise for the Fallen" premiered via the magazine Revolver. The album was voted album of the week by Revolver's readers.

Edge of Paradise's third release, the EP Alive, was released March 10 via ILS/Universal. The six-song EP entered the Billboard charts upon its first week of release, on Billboard's Current Hard Music Albums chart at #58 and Top New Album Artist chart at #94.

Alive gained acclaim from music critics, who called the band a hard rock sensation. Bravewords.com described the EP as a "whole new world, another planet".

The single and title track "Alive" was released on February 3, followed by the music video which premiered on Metal Underground on February 10, and released on Vevo.

Alive was produced by Chuck Johnson, mixed by Jay Ruston, Mike Plotnikoff and Michael Wagener.

Edge of Paradise released their third studio album, Universe, on August 11, 2019.

== Reception and popularity ==
After the release of their first album, Edge of Paradise toured over 20 states, sharing the stage with Kamelot, Chris Broderick of Megadeth, Bullet Boys, Hellion, Helmet, Dave Lombardo of Slayer, and Michael Angelo Batio.

Metalholic stated, "Monet's voice is something that you don't expect, earth-shattering range, rich tone, pure power and strength. That girl can sing and she sings with her heart and soul, I think that's what literally hypnotizes people. There is something iconic about her. She can be idolized not only by generations that are into heavier music but also by the kids that are growing up on pop culture". Hard Rock Haven claimed, "The band can not only put on a show, but they are great songwriters as well. With their memorable hooks and huge choruses, listeners can hum their tunes long after hearing them play. There is no doubt in my mind that Edge of Paradise is on their way to the big stages; they are bound to break through."

Immortal Waltz received critical acclaim as well. The blog The Metal Pit stated, "Immortal Waltz by The Edge of Paradise is one of the most unique-sounding albums I’ve heard in a long, long time."

== Band members ==
Current

- Margarita Monet – vocals (2011–present)
- Dave Bates – lead guitar (2011–present)
- Jamie Moreno – drums (2020–present)
- Kenny Lockwood – bass (2022–present)
- Doug Weiand - rhythm/lead guitar (2024-present)

Former

- Nick Ericson – bass (2015–2018)
- John Chominsky – drums (2012–2018)
- Kevin Katich – drums (2011)
- Gene McEwen – drums (2012)
- Kurt Schaeffer – bass (2011–2014)
- Steven Cook – bass (2011)
- Vanya Kapetanovic – bass (2018–2020)
- Jimmy Lee – drums (2018–2020)
- Ricky Bonazza – bass (2020–2021)
- Justin Blair – bass (2021–2022)
- David Ruiz - rhythm guitar (2017-2024)

== Discography ==
=== Studio albums ===
- Mask (2011)
- Immortal Waltz (2015)
- Universe (2019)
- The Unknown (2021)
- Hologram (2023)
- Prophecy (2025)

=== EPs ===
- Perfect Shade of Black (2013)
- Alive (2017)

=== Singles ===
Title	Year	Album
"In a Dream"	2015	Immortal Waltz
"Rise For the Fallen"	2015	Immortal Waltz
"Alive"	2017	Alive
"Universe"	2019	Universe
"Alone"	2019	Universe
"Fire"	2019	Universe
"In a Dream" (Acoustic)	2020	Non-album single
"Digital Paradise"	2021	The Unknown
"My Method Your Madness"	2021	The Unknown
"Love, Reign o'er Me" (The Who cover)	2021	Non-album single
"The Unknown (Go Higher)"	2022	The Unknown
"Welcome to the Jungle" (Guns N' Roses cover)	2022	Non-album single
"Bound To the Rhythm"	2022	The Unknown
"Hologram"	2023	Hologram
"Soldiers of Danger"	2023	Hologram
"Basilisk"	2023	Hologram
"Another Life	2023	Hologram
"Disarm" (with Caleb Hyles) (The Smashing Pumpkins cover)	2023	Non-album single
"Rogue (Aim For the Kill)"	2024	Prophecy
"Death Note"	2025	Prophecy
"Prophecy Unbound"	2025	Prophecy
"Give It To Me (Mind Assassin)"	2025	Prophecy

=== Music videos ===
Title	Year	Album	Director
"Mask"	2011	Mask	Val Rassi
"Rise For the Fallen"	2015	Immortal Waltz	Unknown
"Alive"	2017	Alive	Val Rassi
"Mystery"	2017	Alive	Natalia Britt
"Face of Fear"	2019	Universe	Val Rassi
"Universe"	2019	Universe	Unknown
"Alone"	2019	Universe	Unknown
"Fire"	2019	Universe	Darren LaFreniere and Tina LaFriere
"World"	2020	Universe	Darren LaFreniere and Tina LaFriere
"Hollow"	2020	Universe	Unknown
"Digital Paradise"	2021	The Unknown	Scott Hansen
"My Methods Your Madness"	2021	The Unknown	Unknown
"The Unknown"	2021	The Unknown	Scott Hansen
"False Idols"	2021	The Unknown	Robyn August
"Love, Reign o'er Me"	2021	Non-album single	Unknown
"Believe"	2022	The Unknown	Nigel Dick
"My Methods Your Madness" (Industrial Remix)	2022	The Unknown	Unknown
"Welcome To the Jungle"	2022	Non-album single	Margarita Monet, Christopher Wanzie, and Val Rassi
"The Unknown (Go Higher)"	2022	The Unknown	Scott Hansen
"Bound To the Rhythm"	2022	The Unknown	Unknown
"One Last Time" (Piano Version)	2023	The Unknown	Dresden7
"Hologram"	2023	Hologram	Isaak Morin
"Basilisk"	2023	Hologram	Isaak Morin
"Disarm"	2023	Non-album single	Unknown
"Disarm" (Alternative Version)	2023	Non-album single	Dresden7
"Rogue (Aim For the Kill)"	2024	Prophecy	Margarita Monet and No Face Studios
"Death Note"	2025	Prophecy	Margarita Monet and No Face Studios
"Prophecy Unbound"	2025	Prophecy	Julian Oyanedel Santiesteban and Margarita Monet
"Give It To Me (Mind Assassin)"	2025	Prophecy	Caleb Wiley and Margarita Monet
"Hear Me"	2025	Prophecy	Julian Oyanedel Santiesteban
"The Other Side of Fear"	2025	Prophecy	Julian Oyanedel Santiesteban and Margarita Monet
"Falling Light"	2025	Prophecy	Julian Oyanedel Santiesteban
"Requiem of the Dream (And the Angels of Static)"	2025	Non-album single	Julian Oyanedel Santiesteban and Margarita Monet
