= Margarita Monet =

American singer (born 1990)

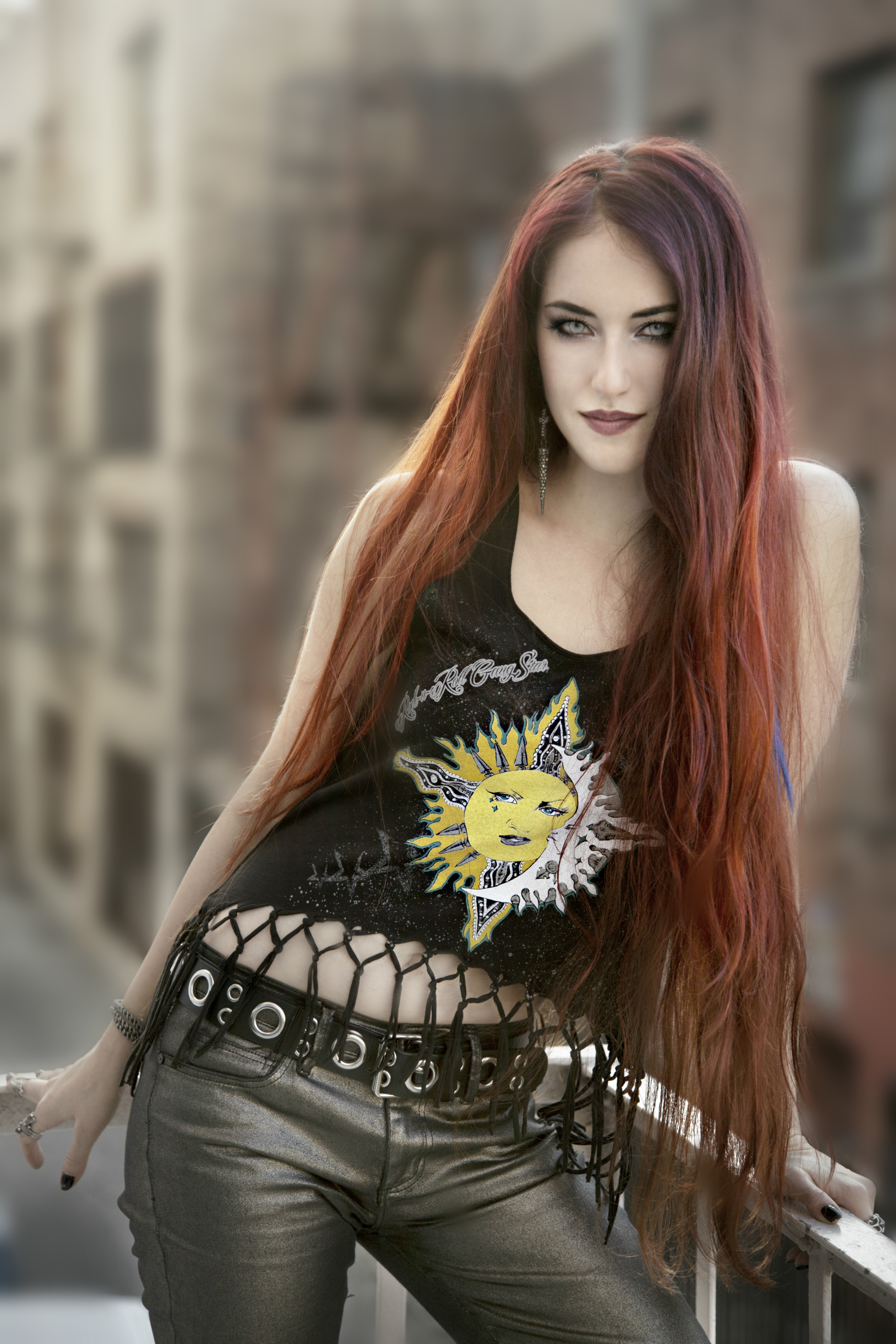

Background information
- Born: Margarita Martirosyan; February 15, 1990 (age 36); Yerevan, Armenia
- Origin: Los Angeles, California, United States
- Occupations: Singer, pianist, composer, actress
- Years active: 2011–present
- Member of: Edge of Paradise

Margarita Monet (born Margarita Martirosyan; February 15, 1990) is an American singer, pianist, composer, and actress. She is the founder and lead vocalist for the American rock band Edge of Paradise. She is known for her powerful voice and incredible range.

== Biography ==
Margarita was born in Yerevan, Armenia and moved to Moscow, Russia at an early age. She started music lessons at the age of four and quickly accelerated into a competitive and performance ready pianist. She has competed and won awards in numerous piano competitions.

At the age of 11 years old, the whole family moved to Houston, she attended High School For The Performing and Visual Arts, for musical theater. After she moved to New York after getting accepted into New York University's Tisch School Of The Arts, where she majored in Theater at the Meisner studio and minored in Music.

Margarita moved to LA in 2010 where she met Dave Bates while working on a project with a local producer. Dave was in search of a singer who had the ability to fill Robin McAuley's shoes. Soon their music partnership created tremendous results and solidified the band that took up the new name, Edge of Paradise.
