= Timbergrove Manor, Houston =

Neighborhood in Houston, Texas

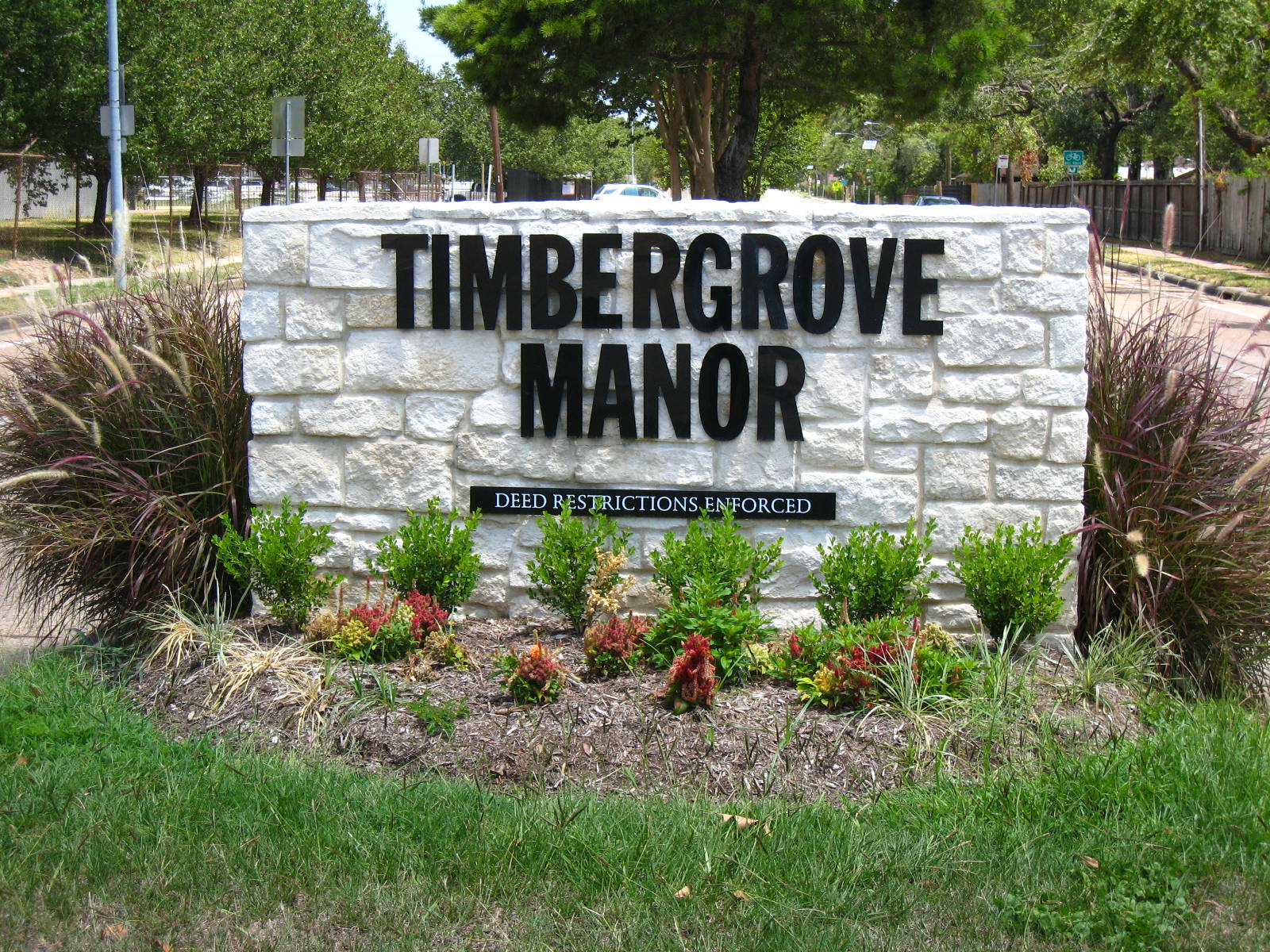
Timbergrove Manor, Houston, Texas entrance sign

Timbergrove Manor is a neighborhood in northwest Houston, Texas. It consists of two sections with two different homeowners associations: Timbergrove Manor Civic Club (TMCC) and Timbergrove Manor Neighborhood Association (TMNA).

Timbergrove Manor derives its name from the pine trees in the community. As of 2009 there are about 1,200 houses there.

== History ==
German American farmers settled the area in the 1800s.

Timbergrove Manor itself was developed beginning in 1950. Chris Lane of the Houston Press interviewed a friend who lived in the area in the 1970s as a child, and the friend stated that he recalled the Timbergrove Manor area "felt safe and seemed like a good neighborhood". Lane contrasted it to the poor reputation of the Houston Heights at the time. After residences in the Houston Heights became more expensive, people wishing to be near the Houston Heights bought houses in Timbergrove Manor. In 2000 Katherine Feser of the Houston Chronicle reported that house prices were rising in Timbergrove Manor. In 2001 it flooded during Tropical Storm Allison.

In 2014 Lane reported that homebuyers wanting to be close to the center of the city continued to buy in the area, and that there were fewer demolitions of older houses compared to Oak Forest.

== Composition ==
The TMCC serves sections 5-14.

The development has ranch-style houses. Lane wrote that lot sizes in Timbergrove Manor were relatively large for houses within the 610 Loop, and since Timbergrove Manor was developed after World War II, its houses appear "much more planned" and "more uniform" compared to ones in the Houston Heights.

== Education ==
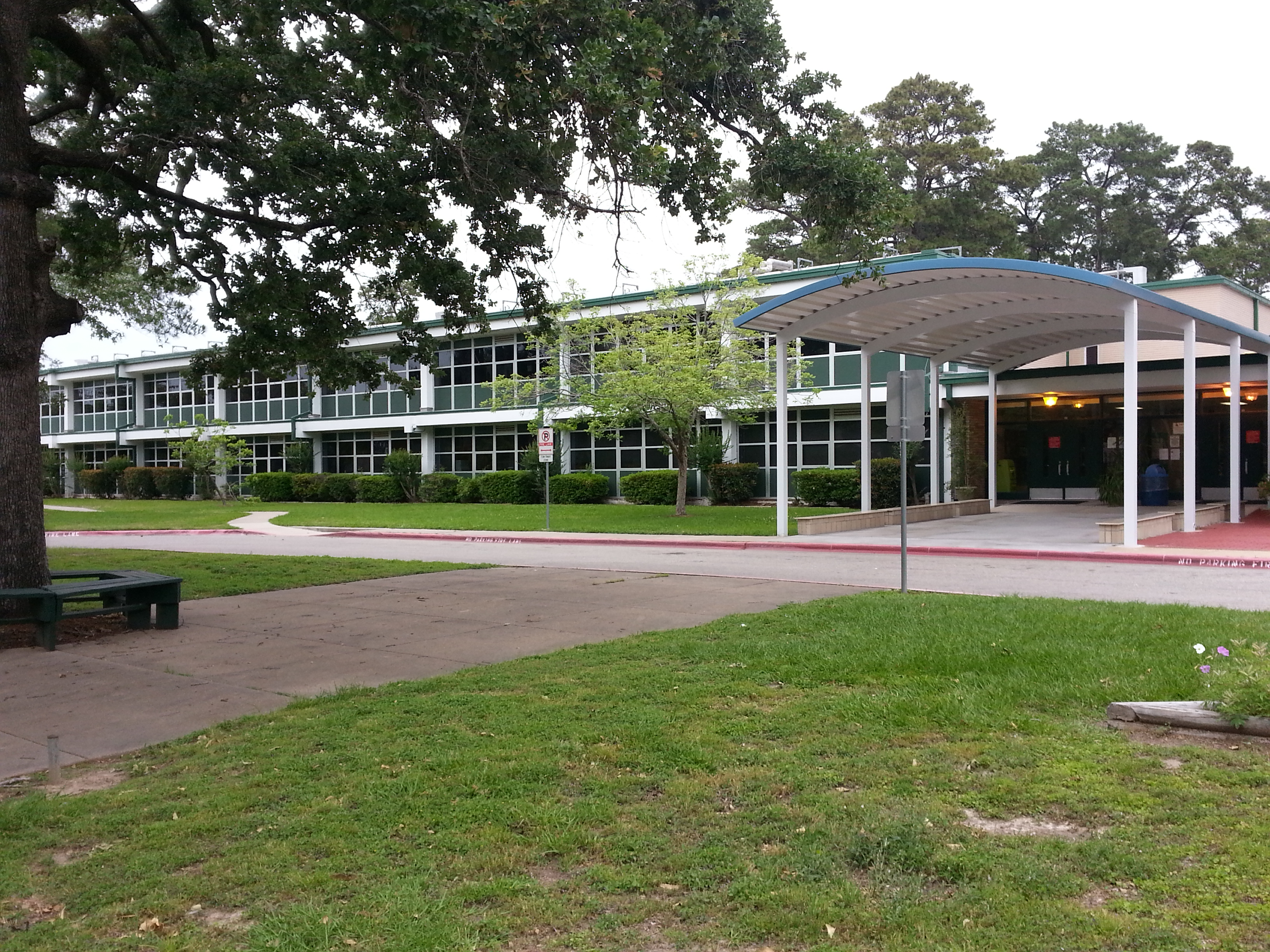
Sinclair Elementary School

Both homeowners associations in Timbergrove Manor are in the Houston Independent School District (HISD).

The TMCC section is assigned to: Sinclair Elementary School, Frank M. Black Middle School, and Waltrip High School. The TMNA section is assigned to: Love Elementary School, Hamilton Middle School, and Waltrip High.

In the late 1970s HISD had plans to move the High School for the Performing and Visual Arts (HSPVA) to a lot in Timbergrove Manor. Parents rallied against the move due to its lack of proximity to Downtown Houston, artist landmarks, and the Houston Museum District, even though the district had already paid $500,000 for planning as of 1979. Instead, it moved to Montrose. The district again considered using the Timbergrove site circa 1998, when the Montrose site became extremely overcrowded and parents requested a new campus, but against parents disapproved the Timbergrove site due to the lack of proximity.

== Parks and recreation ==
Jaycee Park is in TMCC. It underwent a $1 million renovation beginning in 2009; the plans called for adding new athletic facilities and playgrounds, tree planting, and renovating existing ballfields. A former pavilion was demolished as part of the renovations. The Houston Parks and Recreation Department, Houston Parks Board, and Friends of Jaycee Park developed the renovation plan, and the third organization engaged in fundraising campaigns to pay for the park. According to the renovation plans, the park would have a trail, a play area, a baseball field, a basketball court, tennis courts, and a sand volleyball court. It would also have an open area for play and dedicated children's playgrounds. By 2012 the Kinder Foundation paid $100,000 for installing the jogging trail and exercise equipment on the trail site.

West 11th Street Park, in TMCC, is a 20.2-acre (8.2 ha) City of Houston park property; the community already used it as a park by the 1950s. The Timbergrove Sports Association uses the baseball diamond there. The Hogg Foundation, the original owners, gave it to the University of Texas (UT). In the 1950s HISD acquired the property from UT. HISD never developed a school there, and instead sold it to the City of Houston for $9.2 million in 2005 after declaring it "surplus property" the previous year. Under state law HISD had to sell the property once it was declared surplus, and HISD gave priority to the municipal government over any potential private buyers. The City of Houston took out a $3.5 million loan to buy the park, and had been given twelve months to pay it off, or else a part of the park would be repossessed. This prompted residents to set up fundraisers to help pay off the loan.

== Religion ==
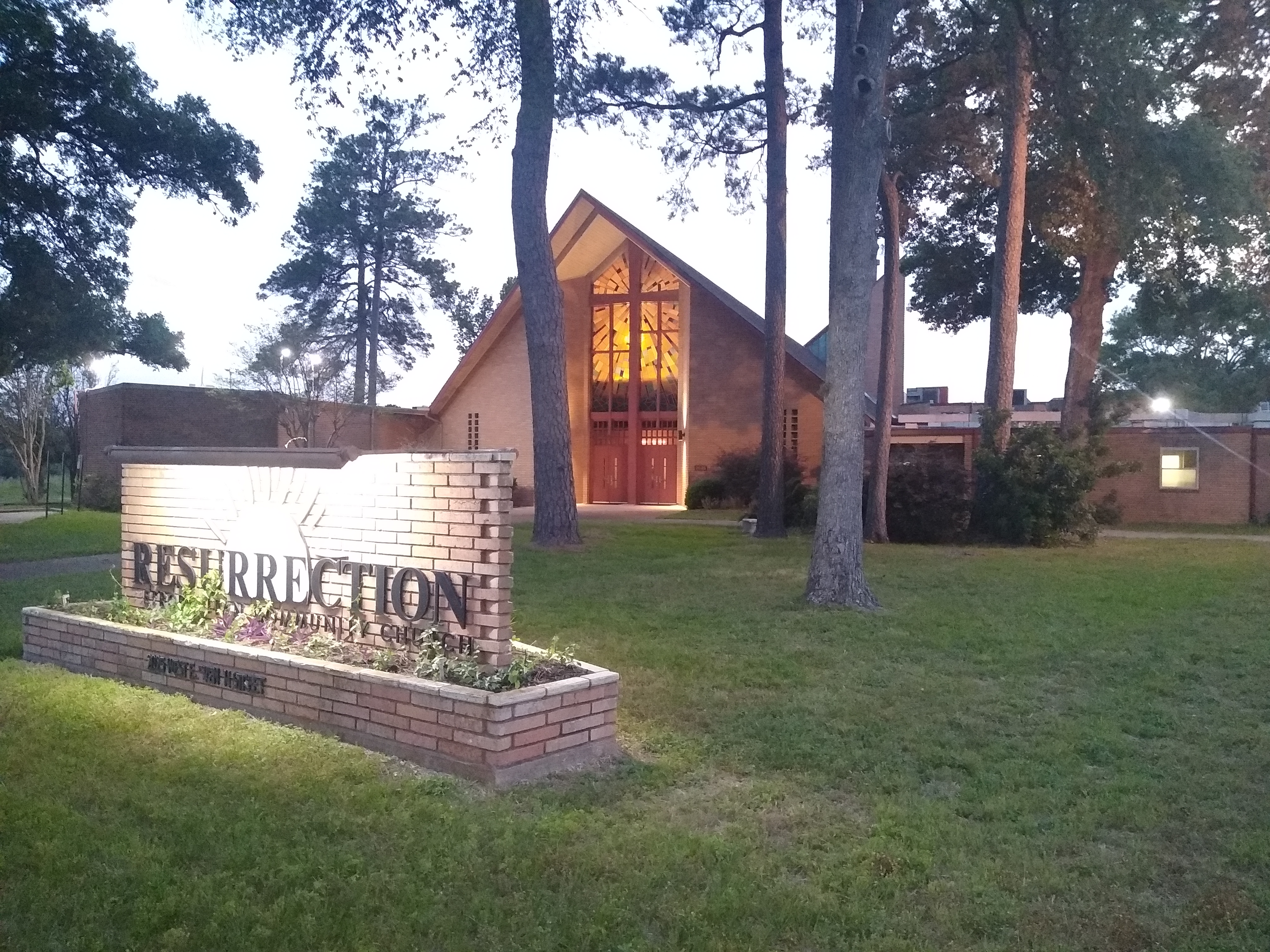
Resurrection Metropolitan Community Church

In 2008 Reverend Dwayne Johnson, the pastor of the Resurrection Metropolitan Community Church, a church in Timbergrove Manor, stated that there were about 15-20 openly gay Christian clergy members in Houston.

Resurrection Metropolitan's main service group is the LGBT community. In 1980 the pastor was gay, and almost all of the congregation was LGBT. In December 2010 Reverend Harry Knox, a pro-LGBT activist, became the leader of the Resurrection Metropolitan. In 2011 Resurrection Metropolitan had 850 members.

== See also ==
- Neighborhoods in Houston
