= Discovery Green =

Park in Houston, Texas

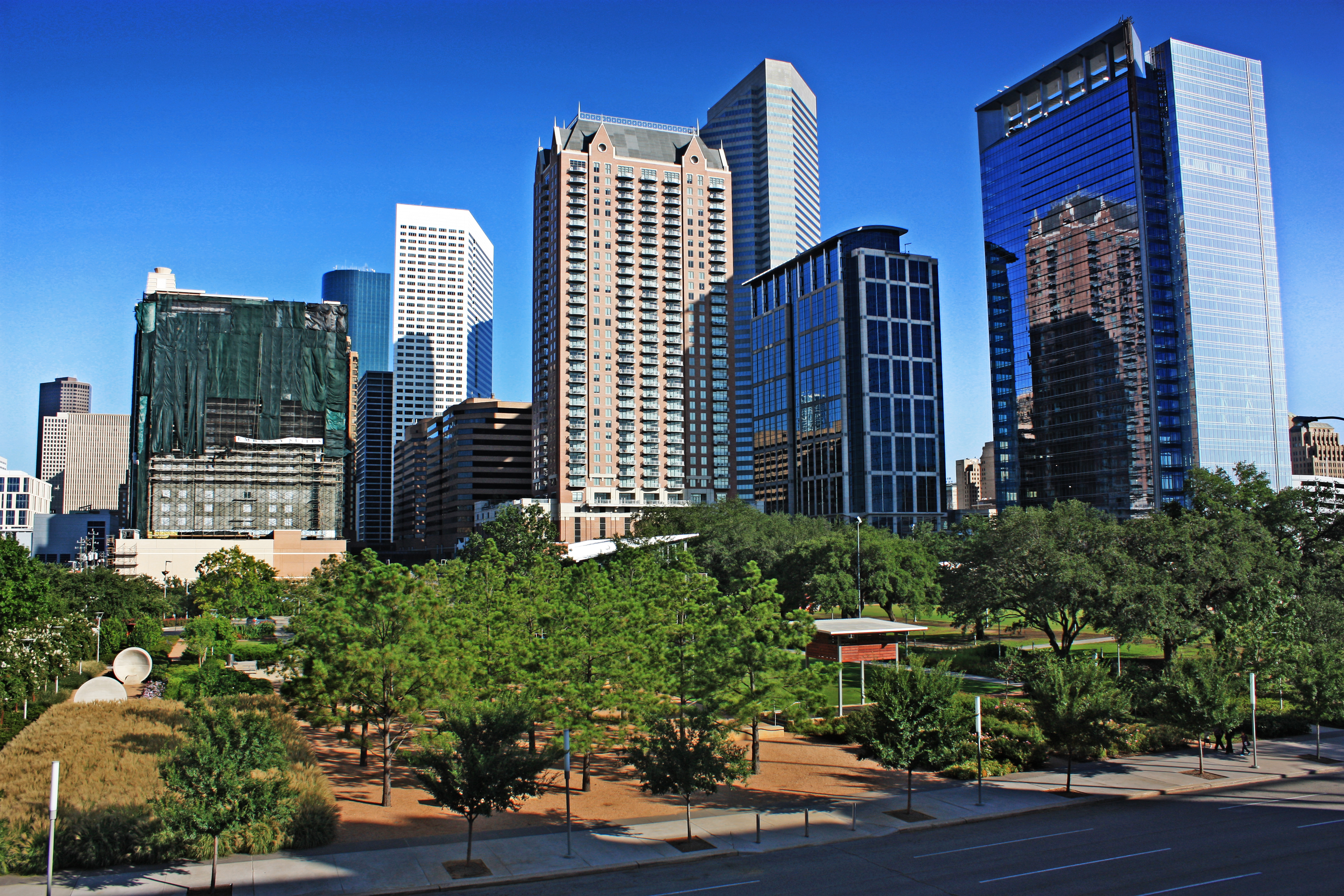
- Discovery Green
- Interactive map of Discovery Green
- Type: Municipal (Houston, Texas)
- Location: Downtown Houston
- Coordinates: 29°45′9″N 95°21′31″W
- Area: 11.78 acres (47,700 m^{2})
- Created: 2008
- Operator: Discovery Green Conservancy
- Status: Open
- Parking: 630-space underground parking garage

Logo of the park

Discovery Green is an 11.78-acre (47,700 m^{2}) public urban park in Downtown Houston, Texas, bounded by La Branch Street to the west, McKinney Street to the north, Avenida de las Americas to the east, and Lamar Street to the south. The park is next to the George R. Brown Convention Center and Avenida Houston entertainment district. Discovery Green has a lake, bandstands and venues for public performances, two dog runs, a playground, and recreational lawns.

In the early 2000s, a public–private partnership between the City of Houston and a group of local philanthropic organizations, including the Kinder Foundation, was formed to build a public green space in Downtown. After this partnership financed the 2004 purchase of surface parking lots on the east side of Downtown, the Discovery Green Conservancy and the City raised $125 million to construct the park. The design of the park, led by landscape architecture firm Hargreaves Associates, began in 2005. Discovery Green opened on April 13, 2008; within two months, an estimated 250,000 people visited the park.

== History ==
The City of Houston acquired a portion of the land in front of the George R. Brown Convention Center in 2002. When the rest of the property went up for sale, a group of philanthropists led by Maconda Brown O’Connor of the Brown Foundation, and Nancy G. Kinder of the Kinder Foundation approached then-Mayor Bill White with their idea of turning the space into an urban park. White agreed and became a strong advocate of a public-private partnership developed for the $125 million project. Several other philanthropic foundations joined the effort, including the Wortham Foundation and the Houston Endowment, Inc. The Kinder Foundation provided $10 million to help fund the $125 million project.

The City of Houston purchased the remainder of the land in 2004 and created the framework for the park’s construction and operations, including the formation of Discovery Green Conservancy.

When the Houston City Council approved the contracts to provide partial funding and support to the park, it also mandated that the “public at large” be engaged in the design and development of the park. With the guidance of Project for Public Spaces, the Conservancy mounted large public meetings and smaller focus groups to solicit public feedback. This feedback became the basis for the park’s programming.

Hargreaves Associates, an internationally renowned landscape architecture firm based in San Francisco, oversaw the design effort. Page [formerly PageSoutherlandPage] designed the park's architecture and Larry Speck was their lead architect. Lauren Griffith Associates provided landscape and horticultural design services. Artists Margo Sawyer and Doug Hollis were members of the design team and produced three works of art for the park. A large team of local and international engineers and specialists supported the core design team. Elmore Public Relations was hired for marketing and public relations.

Snce the park opened in 2008, an estimated $1 billion worth of buildings, offices, hotels, and housing projects have been built nearby.

In 2009, the One Park Place opened, a high-end residential tower that houses 346 units. In 2011, the Hess Tower was built, a 29-story office building. On 2016, the thousand-room Marriott Marquis convention hotel was built north of the park.

The park earned LEED certification in October 2009.

== Design process ==
Hargreaves Associates and their team of architects, engineers, and artists took 13 months to design and finalize the park. Notable challenges would be the dense intersection and the intricate design of implementing the garage with the surface park.

The park is placed in the center of cross axes.

The linear plaza is lined by Mexican Sycamore trees and designed pavement.

The path supports farmers markets, art fairs and parades.

== Park features ==
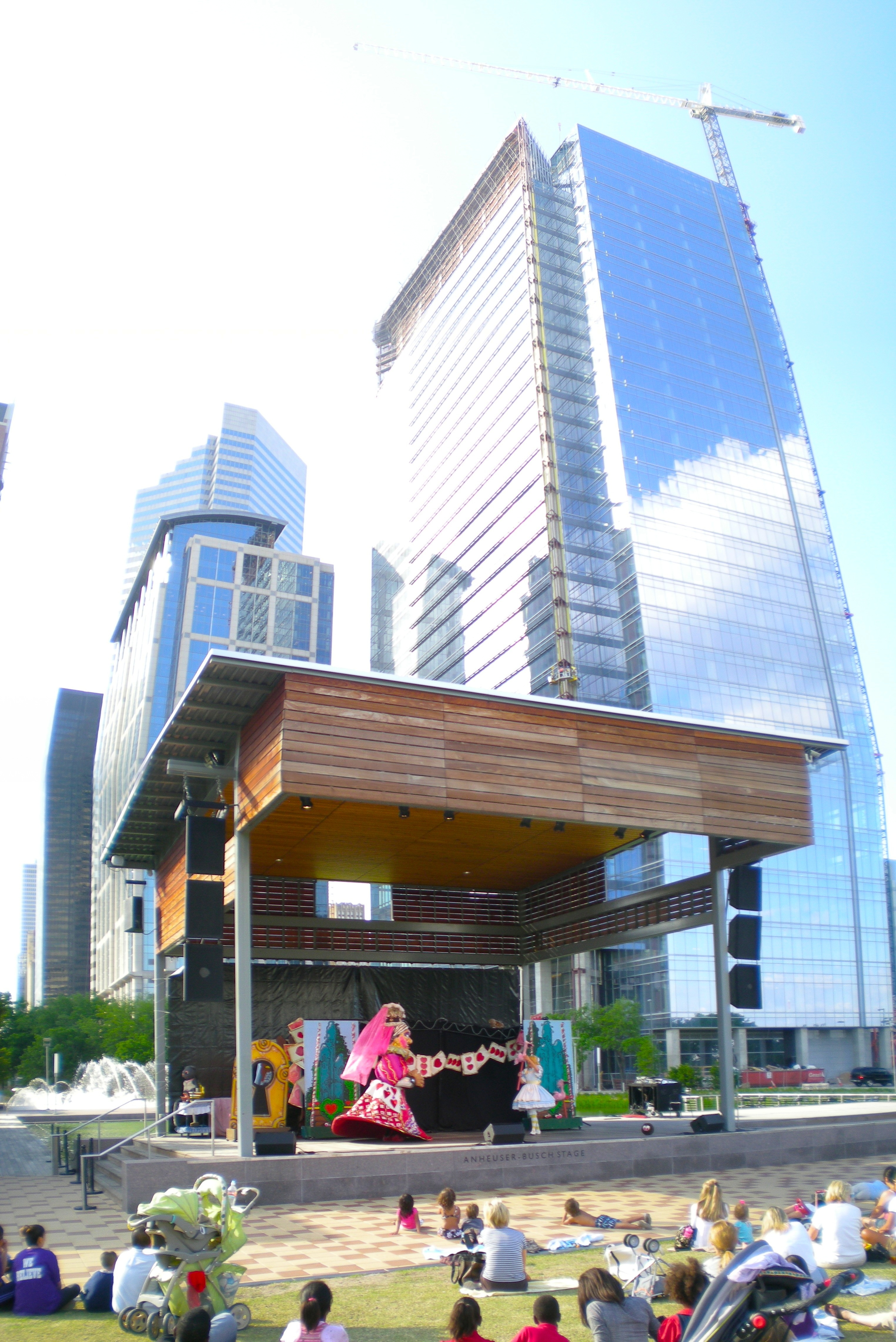
Anheuser-Busch Stage with an overlooking Hess Tower

- Anheuser-Busch Stage - a performance stage
- Jones Lawn - a 2-acre (8,100 m^{2}) grass lawn for lounging, offering views of the skyline
- The Brown Foundation Promenade - a shaded walkway, lined with 100-year-old live oak trees
- Wortham Foundation Gardens - 1-acre (4,000 m^{2}) of flowering trees, plants, fountains and works of art
- Kinder Lake - a 1-acre (4,000 m^{2}) lake lined with native wetland plants
- Gateway Fountain - The fountain offers a view of water activity atop a sloping granite surface to the park
- The Natural Gardens - wetland and upland gardens extending the length of the park
- The Landforms - several sculpted grassy knolls with views of downtown Houston
- McNair Foundation Jogging Trail - tree-shaded promenades on which to stroll to the lake and children’s area
- Maconda's Grove - where persons can play bocce on the Carruth Foundation Bocce Courts
- The John P. McGovern Playground, renovated in 2021
- Hagstette Putting Green
- Two dog runs - one for large dogs and another for smaller dogs with seating areas for their owners
- Approximately 630-car underground parking garage.

The Schiller Del Grande Restaurant Group, best known as the creators of Cafe Annie, operates two restaurants on site. The Grove serves lunch and dinner in a "signature restaurant" setting, while The Lake House offers casual fare.

On occasions Discovery Green has an ice skating rink.

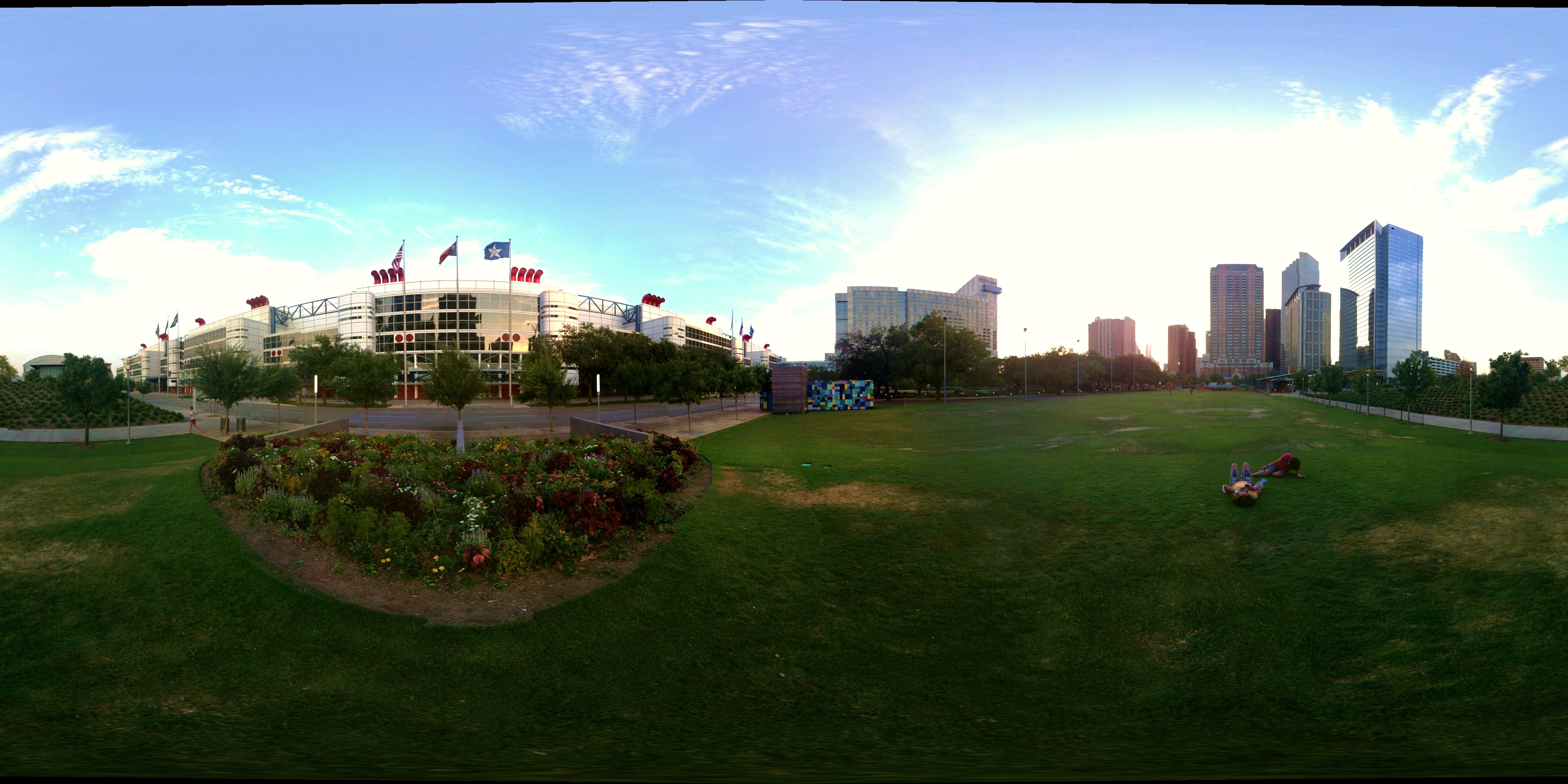
360° View of Discovery Green Park in Downtown Houston

== Public art ==
- Monument au Fantóme - A piece of artwork by Jean Dubuffet donated by Dan Duncan was moved from 1100 Louisiana in downtown Houston in October 2007 after some restoration. The estimated value of this sculpture is $1 million, including restoration. It was created between 1969 and 1971 as part of the Hourloupe series.
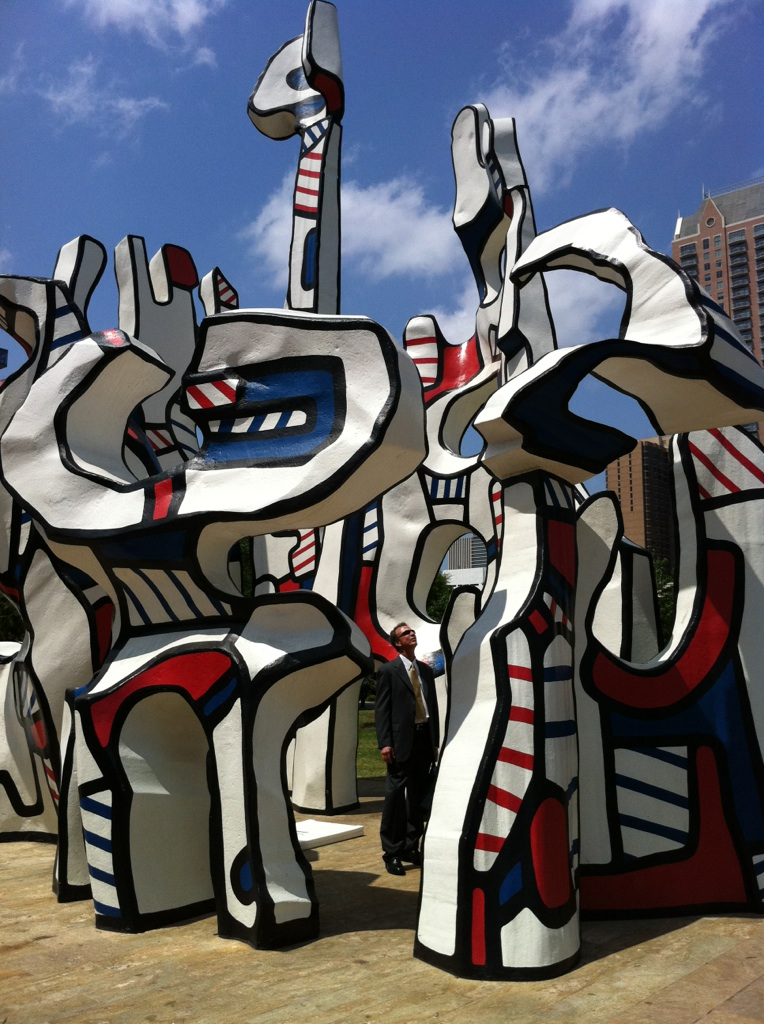
Monument au Fantóme by DuBuffet
- Synchronicity of Color - Artist Margo Sawyer's installation sits at both exits of the underground garage, with accents at The Grove and The Lake House. The 151 panels hold 1,500 aluminum boxes in 65 colors. The paint on these boxes is also used in under water applications for oil rigs and was gifted by International Paint LLC. Some elements are kamelion car paint color and also Dicroic film, a new technology and application.
- Listening Vessels - Sculptor Doug Hollis’ Listening Vessels, a gift from Maconda Brown O’Connor, sits in the midst of the Urban Gardens. The two parabolas, cut from solid limestone and spaced 60 feet (18 m) apart, amplify faraway sounds, like conversation.
- Mist Tree - Hollis also created the Mist Tree, a gift from Fayez Sarofirm, located next to the playground. The Mist Tree is a 15-foot (4.6 m)-high-by-22-foot-wide stainless steel structure intended to attract people to the park.
Mist Tree

== Planned events and uses ==
Discovery Green offers a variety of programming throughout the year. Most events at the park are free and open to the public. Discovery Green presents Houston's performing, literary and visual art in its Art Series. Discovery Green's Entertainment Series offers movies, Extreme Wii competitions, and concerts by musicians that present a variety of Gulf Coast and Central Texas sounds. The Healthy Living in the Park series offers a weekly urban market and exercise classes such as Pilates, Yoga, Parkour and Zumba as well as a Hip2BFit exercise class just for kids. The Families & Children Series offers hands-on workshops and activities suitable for children and their parents.

On weekends, families can visit the park, put their pets in one of two dog runs and watch their kids play on the playground while they discard their newspapers and cans into recycling bins.

The park has hosted major seasonal events, including outdoor exploration, kid-friendly entertainment, and charity donations.

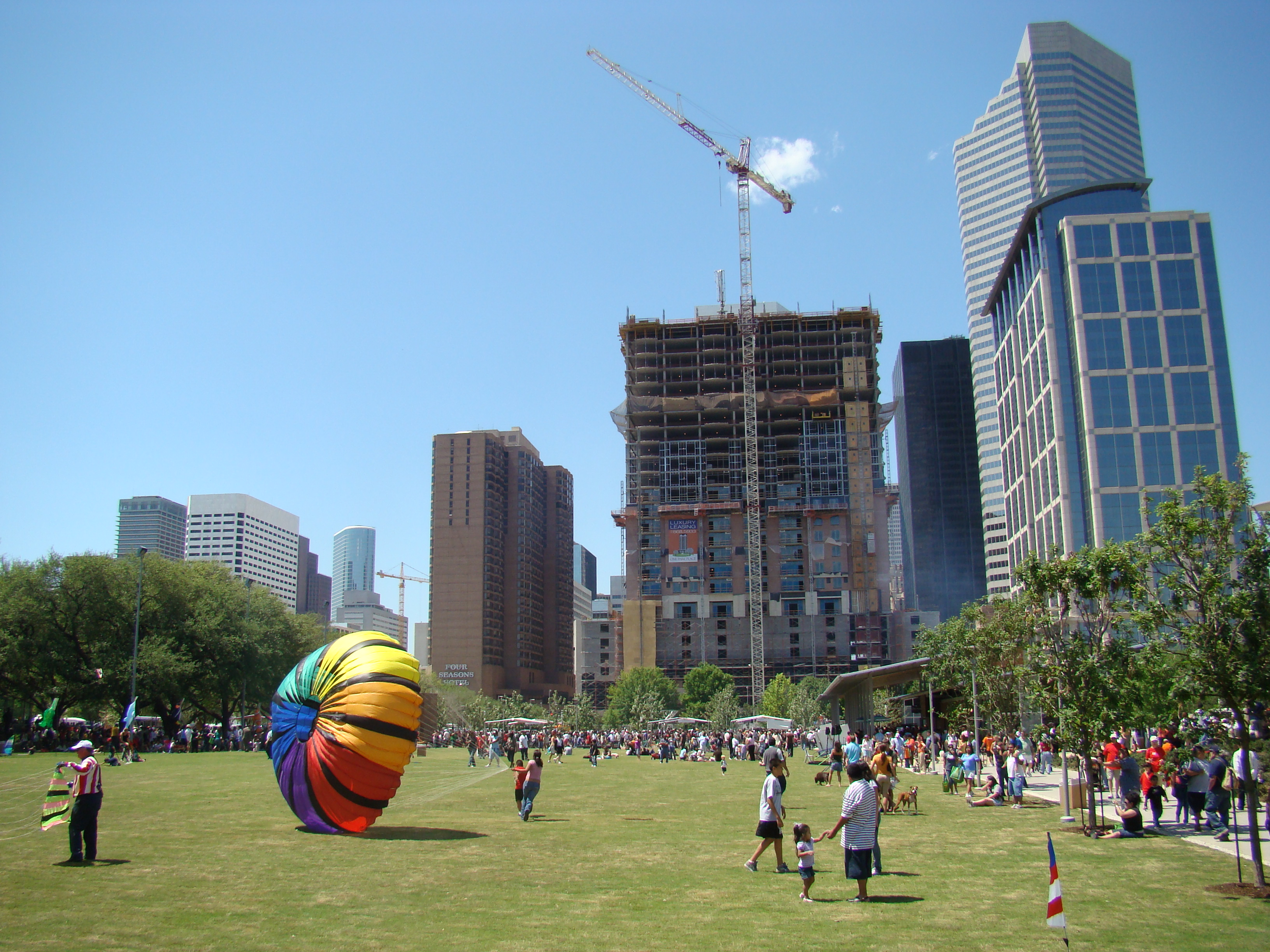
Jones Lawn

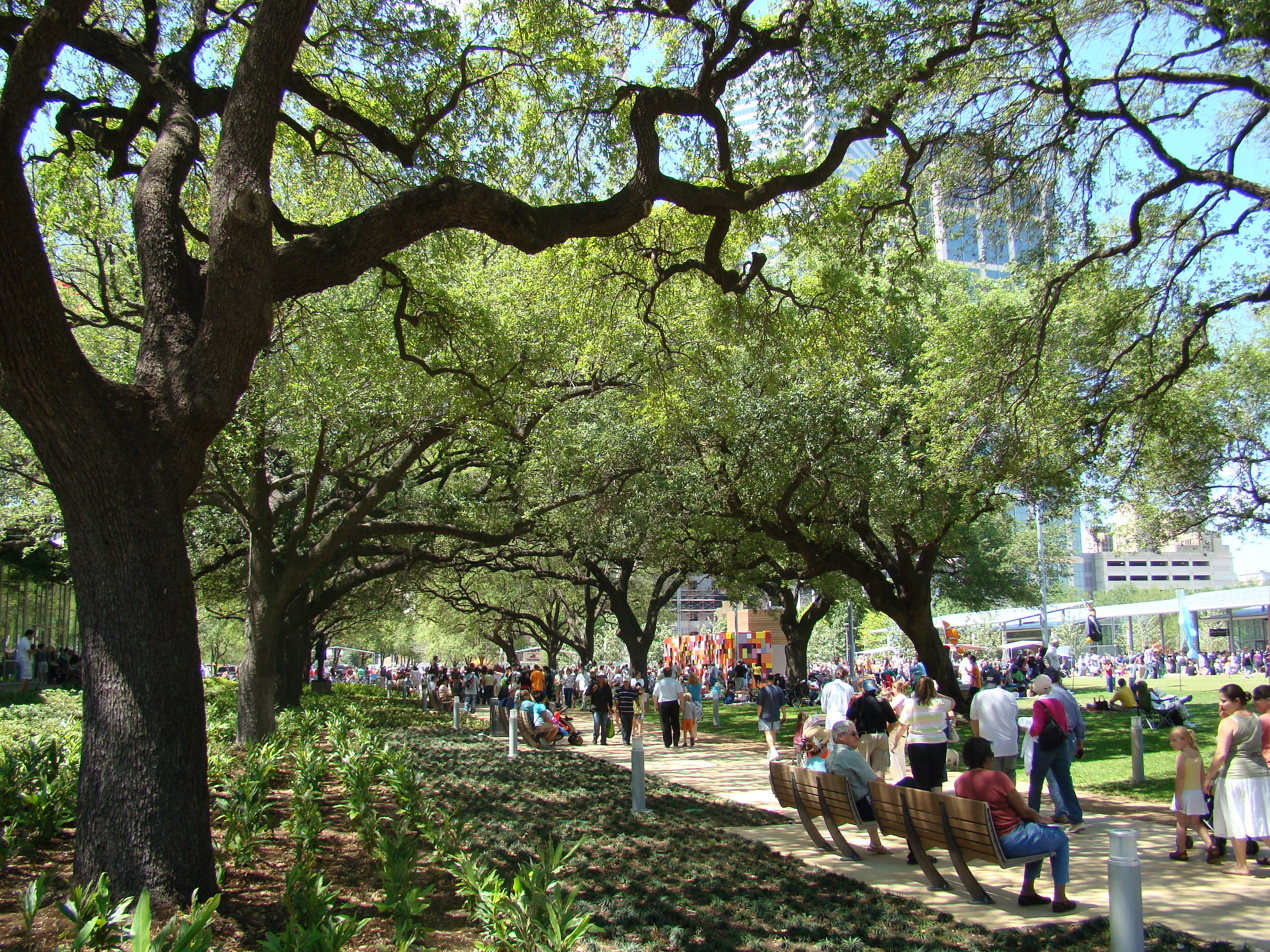
The Brown Foundation Promenade

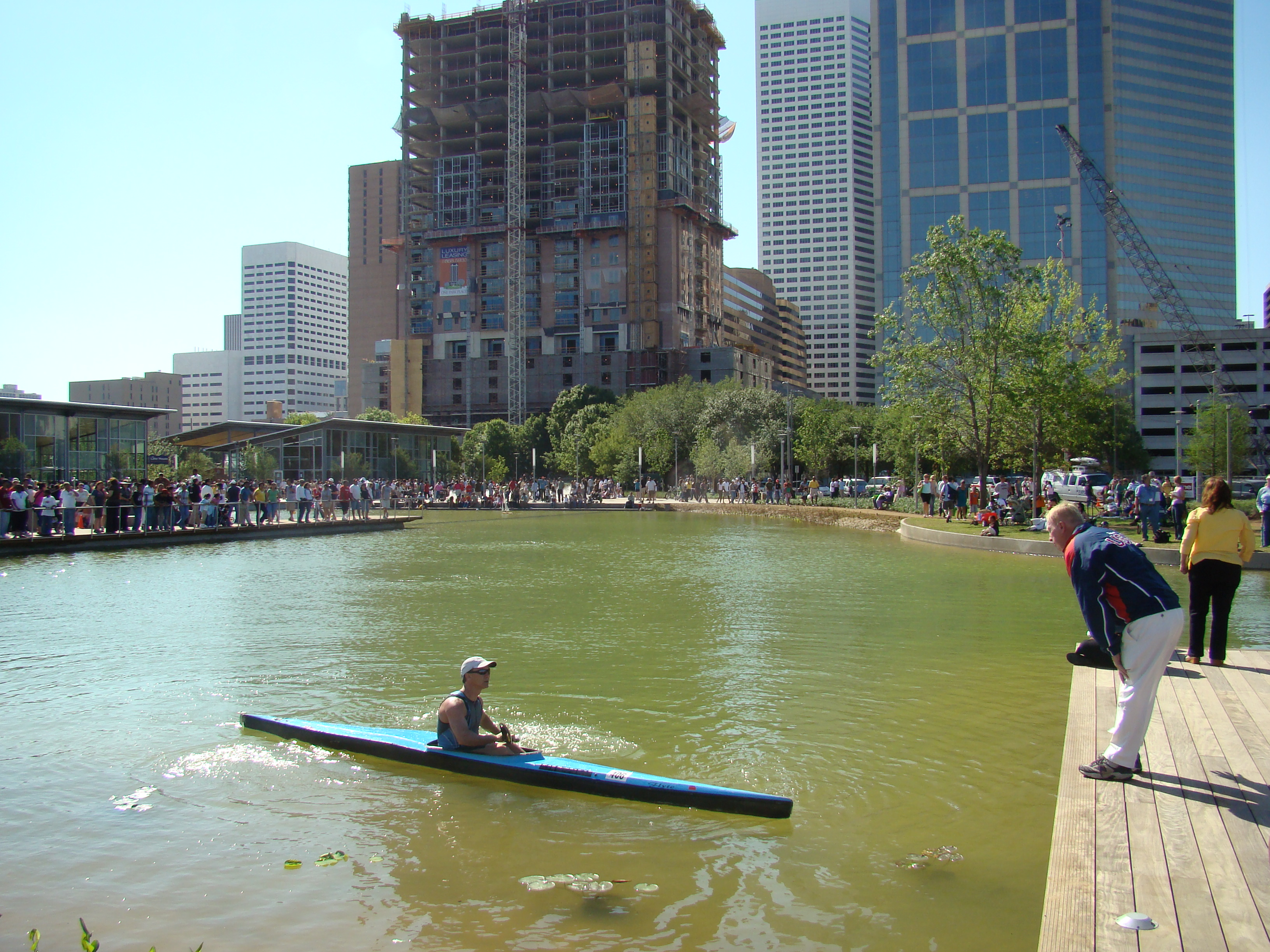
Kinder Lake

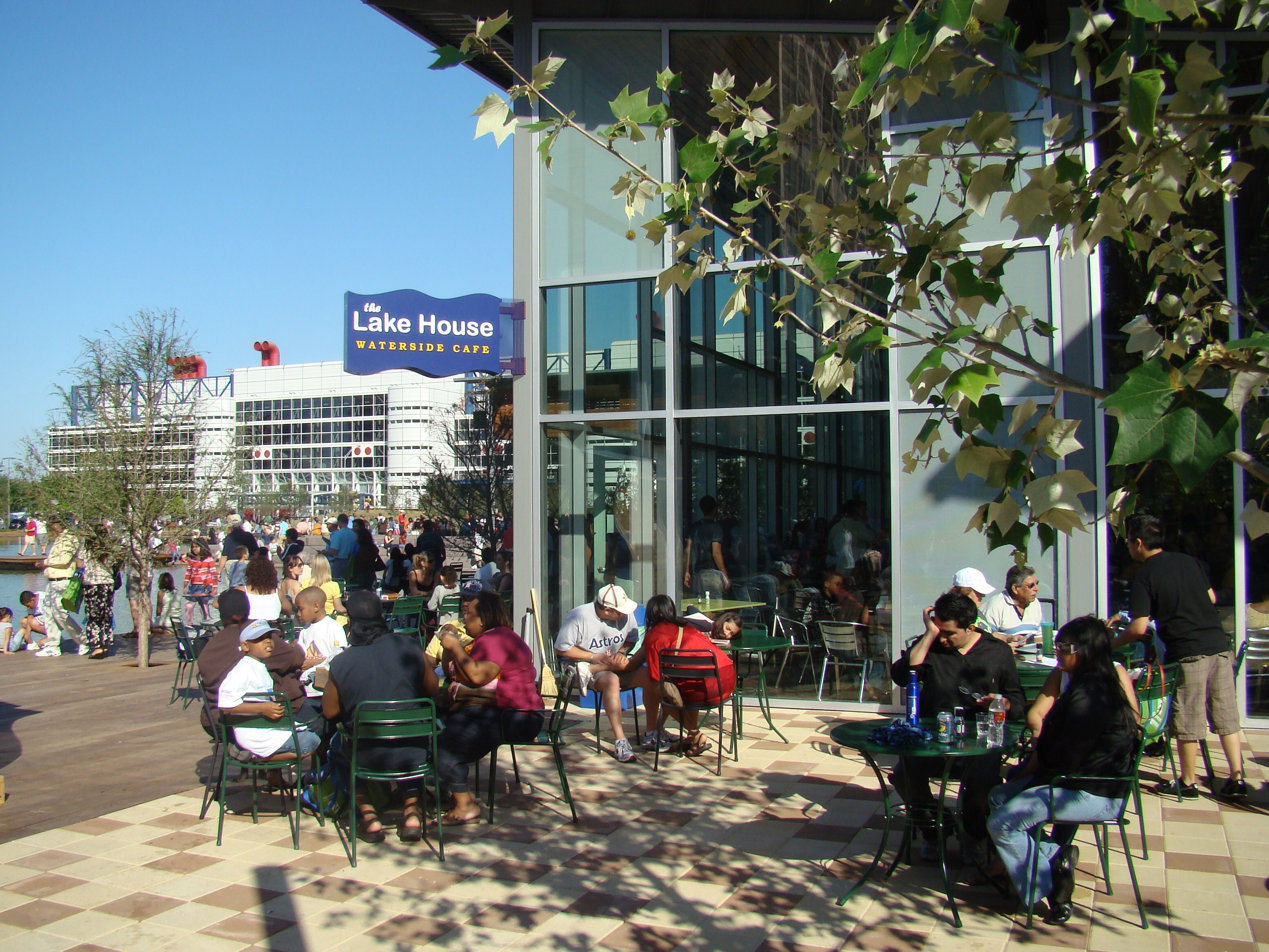
The Lake House Waterside Cafe

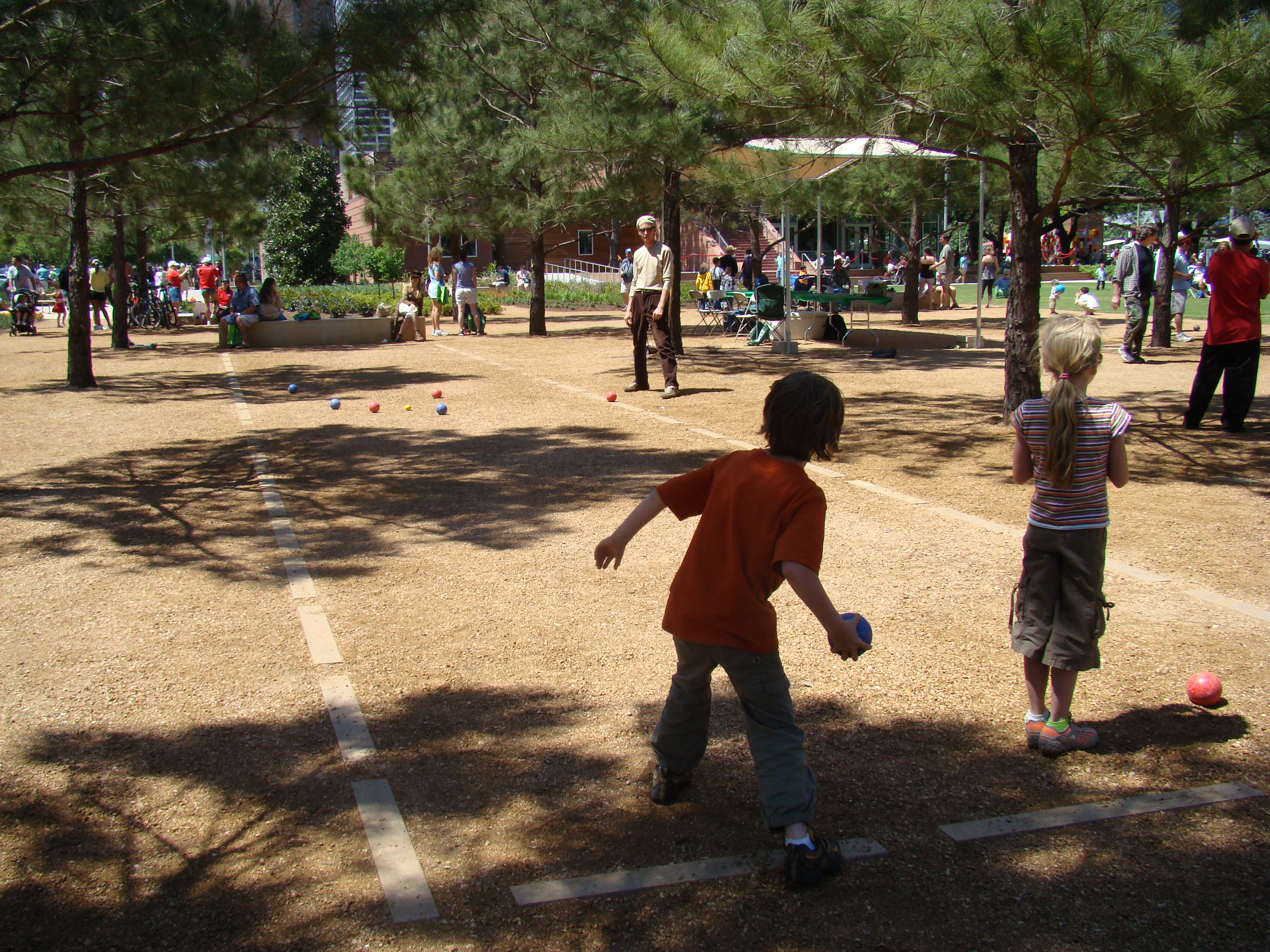
Carruth Foundation Bocce Courts in Maconda's Grove

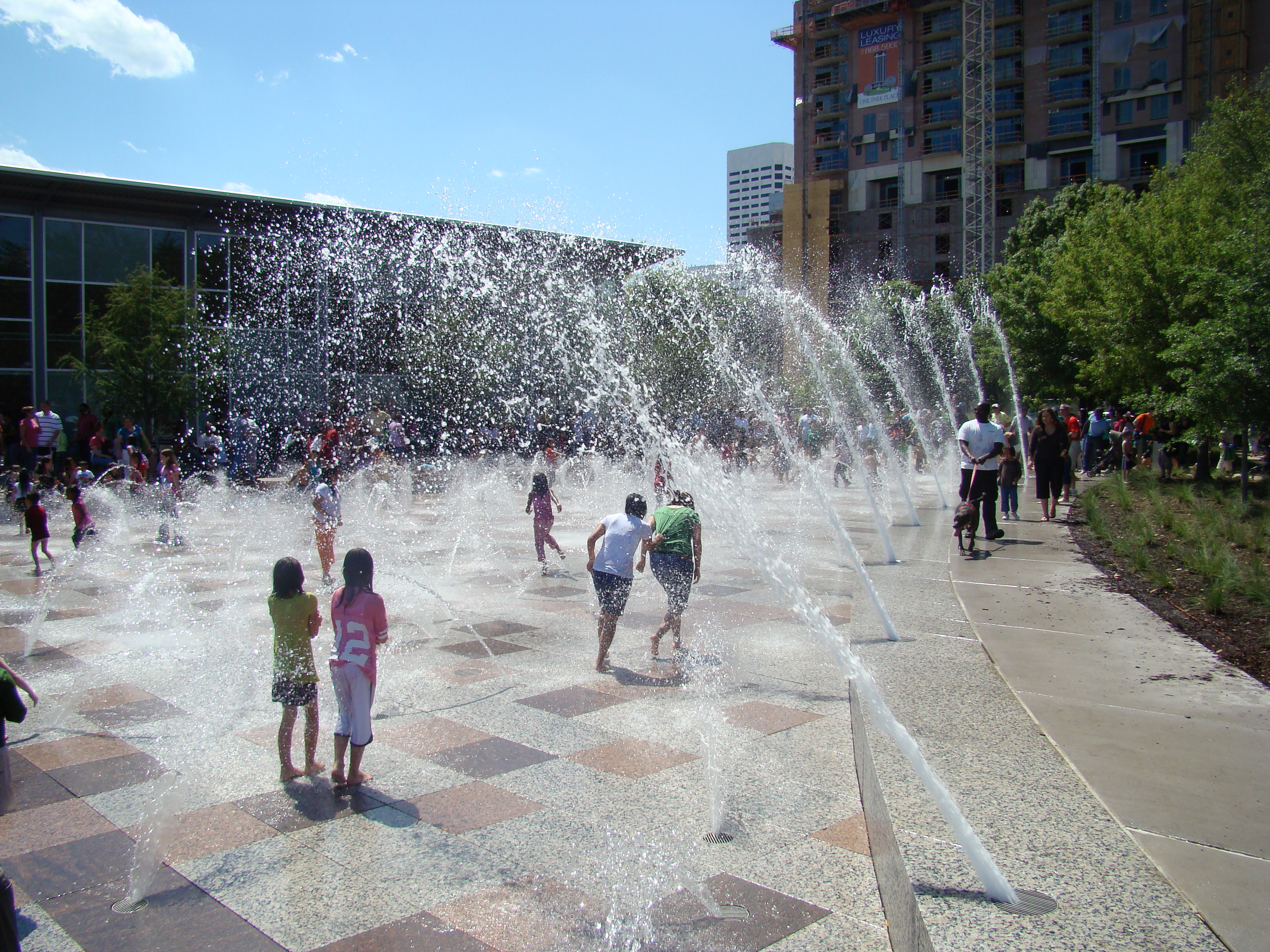
Gateway Fountain

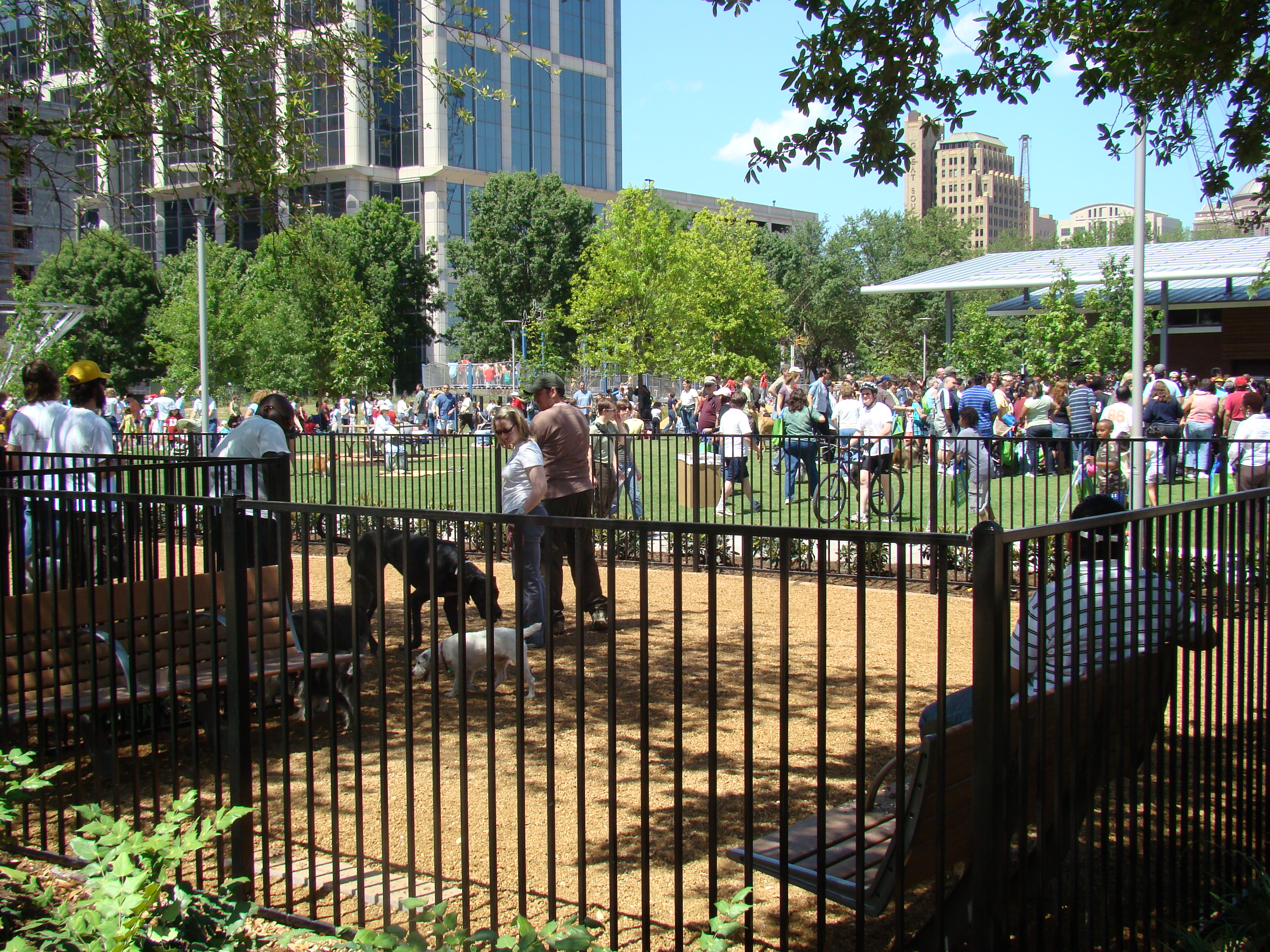
Kinder Large Dog Run

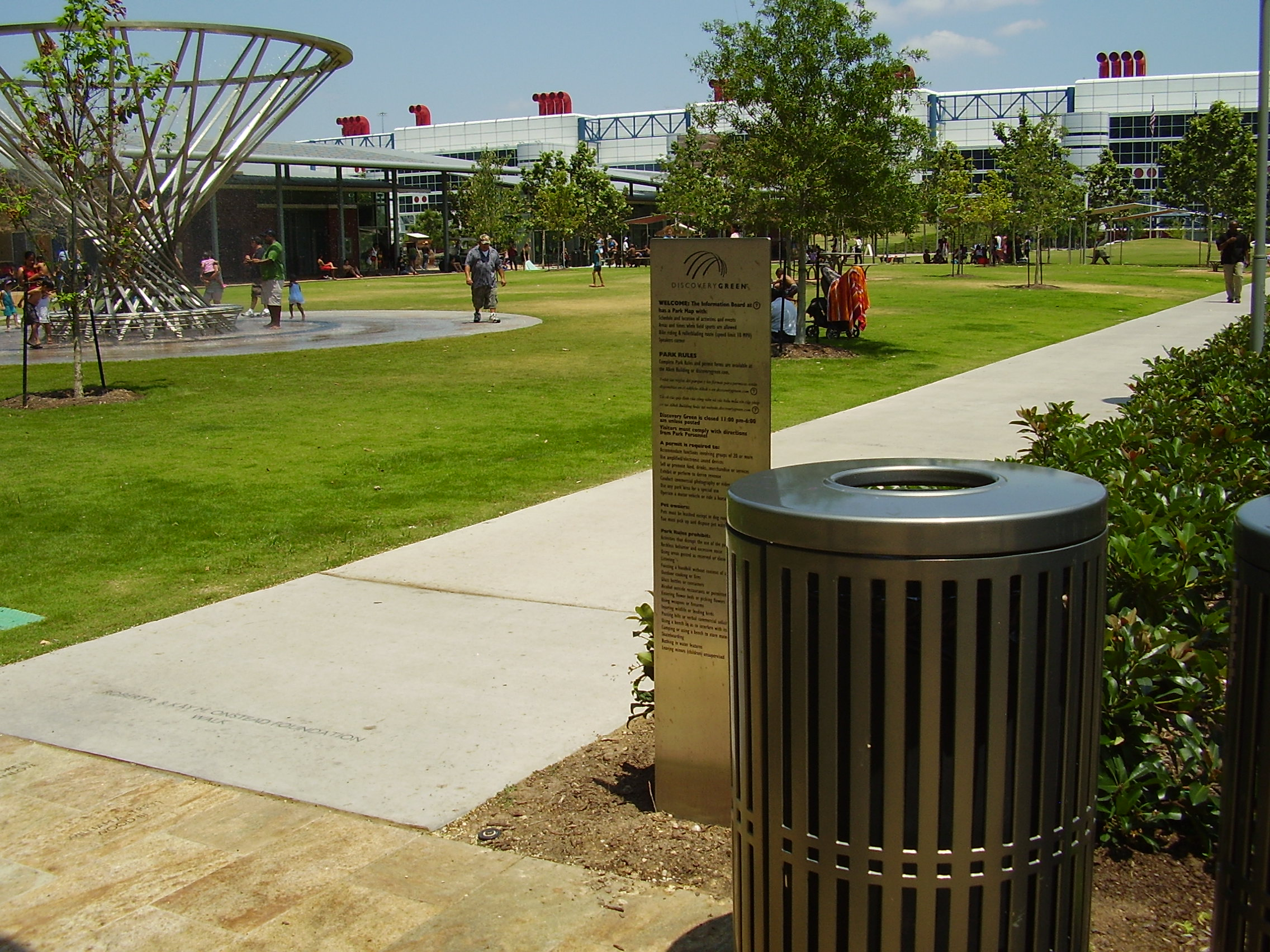
An entrance, with the George R. Brown convention center in the background

== See also ==
- Urban parks
