= Kinder Foundation =

Houston-based nonprofit

- Formation: 1997; 29 years ago
- Type: 501(c)(3) organization
- Headquarters: Houston, TX, United States
- Key people: Kathryn R. Dollins; Gary Dudley; Aarti Garehgrat; Guy Hagstette, FAIA; Christina Johnson; Sabrina Kirwin
- Revenue: $48,564,469 (2016)
- Expenses: $40,867,682 (2016)
- Website: www.kinderfoundation.org

The Kinder Foundation is a Houston-based 501c3 nonprofit organization. It was established in 1997 by Richard Kinder and Nancy Kinder. As of December 2025, the Kinder Foundation has committed more than $900 million in grants and transformation gifts to Houston projects.

== Major projects ==
The Kinder Foundation supports transformational urban park projects in the Houston area, as well as quality of life and education initiatives.

== Green space ==
=== Discovery Green ===
The Discovery Green park project grew from an idea by Maconda Brown O’Connor and Nancy Kinder to create an urban park in downtown Houston. Several philanthropic foundations joined the public-private partnership with the City of Houston in 2004 to create the park which was completed in 2008. As the first board chair for the nonprofit Discovery Green Conservancy, Nancy Kinder led the $54 million private fundraising campaign, contributing $10 million from the Kinder Foundation, for the overall $125 million project. Discovery Green opened in 2008, hosts more than 400 free events a year, and as of 2018, has spurred $1.4 billion in development around the park.

=== Buffalo Bayou Park ===
The Buffalo Bayou Park is a 160-acre, 2.3 mile stretch of Buffalo Bayou's parkland inside Houston. In 2010, the foundation provided a catalyst gift of $30 million to Buffalo Bayou Partnership who, in conjunction with the City of Houston and Harris County Flood Control District, led the efforts to restore the area to a more natural and self-sustaining state, reintroduce native landscapes, and add amenities to enhance safety and convenience for visitors. The project was completed in 2015 and has received numerous accolades, including Urban Land Institute's Global Award for Excellence.

=== Buffalo Bayou East ===
In September 2022, Buffalo Bayou Partnership announced the Buffalo Bayou East Master Plan would become a reality thanks to a historic public-private partnership anchored by a $100 million grant from Kinder Foundation, the largest single donation in Houston parks history. This plan integrates new bayou parks, trails, housing, cultural destinations, and infrastructure improvements into the Greater East End and Fifth Ward neighborhoods.

=== Memorial Park ===
On April 25, 2018, the Kinder Foundation pledged $70 million to the Memorial Park Conservancy to accelerate the Memorial Park Master Plan. Highlights include completion of the park's Eastern Glades, improve connectivity to regional existing trails and create new trails within the park, relocate ball fields, build a running track at the running center, and develop a Memorial Grove.

=== Bayou Greenways 2020 ===
In October 2013, it was announced that the foundation would give $50 million to the Houston Parks Board for the Bayou Greenways 2020 Project, one of the most ambitious park projects in the country. When complete in 2020, the $220 million project which will create 1,500 acres of new parkland within Houston and connect 150 miles of trails along the bayous.

=== MacGregor Park ===
In December 2023, Kinder Foundation gave $27 million to an effort by the Houston Parks Board to renovate MacGregor Park.

== Education ==
=== University of Missouri’s Kinder Institute on Constitutional Democracy ===
In 2014, the Kinder Foundation made possible the Kinder Forum on Constitutional Democracy at the University of Missouri, a new program to support excellence in the teaching and study of American constitutional and democratic traditions. In 2015, the foundation made a new, endowed gift of $25 million to MU to provide permanent support for the renamed Kinder Institute on Constitutional Democracy. In 2019, the foundation granted an additional $10 million to support new degree opportunities for undergraduate and graduate students.In 2022, they gifted $25 million to expand faculty and popular program offerings, and in 2026, another $25 million to strengthen the institute’s work.

== Quality of life ==
=== Rice University’s Kinder Institute for Urban Research ===
Rice University’s Kinder Institute for Urban Research is dedicated to resolving issues that face some of the country's largest urban centers, including Houston. In 2010, the Kinder Foundation provided a $15 million grant to support expanded research in Houston and in major cities around the world, and the institute was renamed in their honor. Kinder Foundation also granted $50 million in 2022 and $55 million in 2026, bringing the foundation’s total support of the institute to over $135 million.

=== Museum of Fine Arts, Houston ===
In January 2015, the Kinder Foundation committed a principal gift of $50 million to the Museum of Fine Arts, Houston for the redevelopment of its 14-acre campus. In recognition of the gift, a new 164,000 square-foot building will be named the Nancy and Rich Kinder Building and will house 54,000 square feet of gallery space for exhibitions and for the Museum's collections of modern and contemporary art.

=== Kinder Children's Cancer Center ===
On May 14, 2025, Texas Children’s Hospital and The University of Texas MD Anderson Cancer Center announced a $150 million gift from Kinder Foundation to support the launch of Kinder Children’s Cancer Center, a transformational collaboration between the two institutions with a single mission: to end childhood cancer. Kinder Children’s Cancer Center will launch in 2026, with plans to build a new TMC facility with inpatient beds, ambulatory care and state-of-the-art research labs. It will be connected by a sky bridge to Texas Children’s Hospital, the largest children’s hospital in the nation.

=== Other projects ===
The Kinder Foundation has provided grants for Cristo Rey Jesuit College Preparatory of Houston; the Museum of Fine Arts, Houston; The Bush Center at Southern Methodist University; The Archdiocese of Galveston-Houston; and The Texas Heart Institute's Center for Coronary Artery Anomalies.

In October 2016 the Kinder Foundation obtained perpetual naming rights to Houston's High School For the Performing and Visual Arts for $7.5 million. The contract was approved by the school board after the Kinder Foundation said it would withdraw the funds if the board did not vote, six days after the public announcement of the deal. In April 2017, in response to a petition asking the Kinders to give the name back, Richard Kinder to wrote to the Superintendent of Houston Independent School District. Citing negative controversy, he offered to release the naming rights but did not request or suggest that the original name be restored. The issue is unresolved. The name change will be effective when the new downtown school building is occupied, expected to be January 2019.

== Founders ==
Richard Kinder is the executive chairman of Kinder Morgan, Inc. He and his wife Nancy Kinder signed the Giving Pledge in 2011, asserting their desire to donate 95 percent of their worth to charity at the time of their deaths. Rich and Nancy were 40th on Forbes’ Top 50 Givers list in 2018 and 33rd on the Chronicle of Philanthropy's "Philanthropy 50", a chronicle of the nation's biggest contributors to charitable organizations, in 2016. The Kinders also placed 28th on the Chronicle of Philanthropy's Philanthropy 50.
