= Islam in Houston =

Religion in the United States

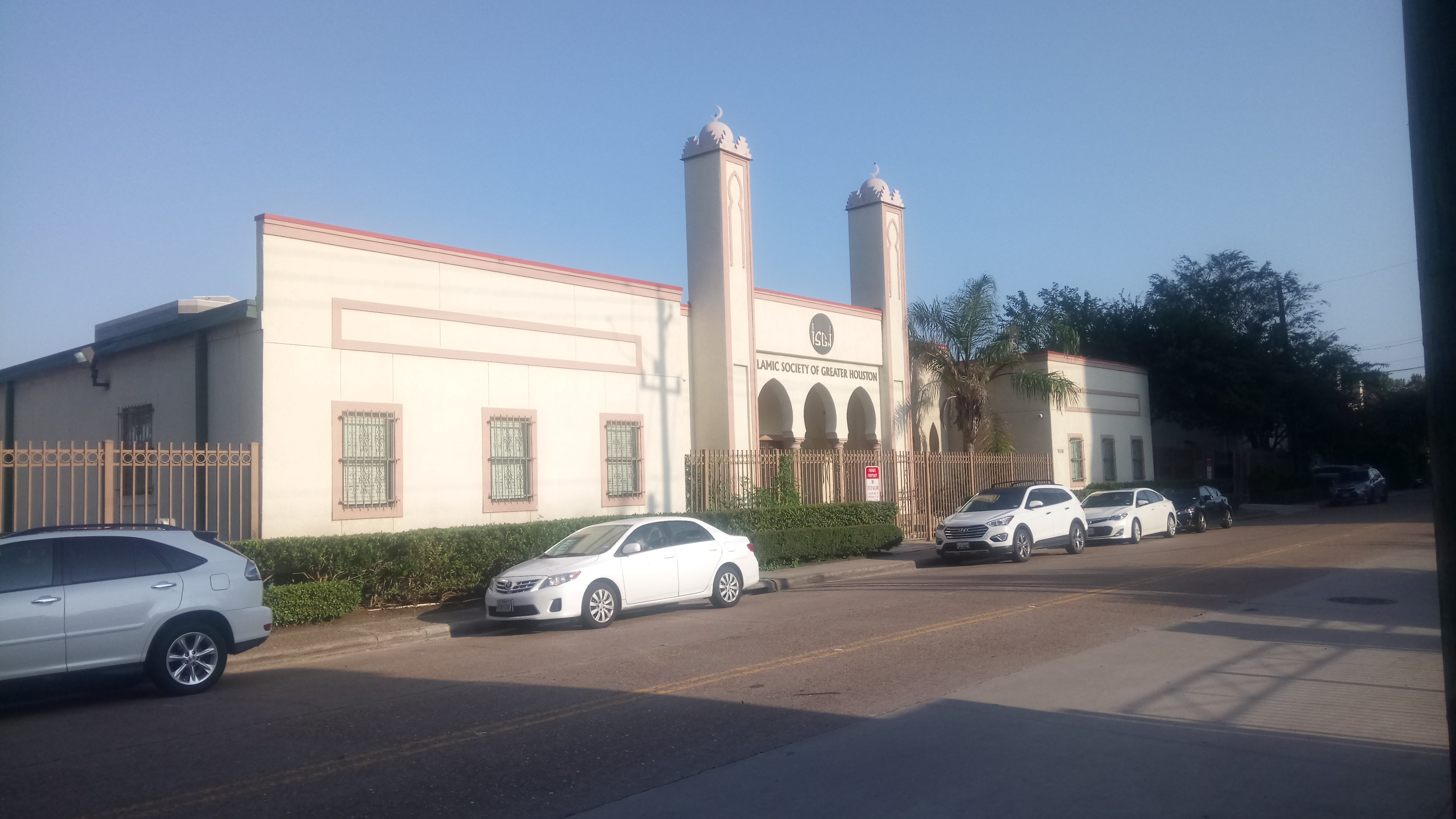
Islamic Society of Greater Houston (ISGH) headquarters (Eastside Main Center)

As of 2012, the city of Houston has the largest Muslim population in Texas and the largest Muslim population in the Southern United States. That year, Kate Shellnut of the Houston Chronicle wrote that "Some estimate that Muslims make up 1.2 percent of the city's population." In 2025, Muslims are now estimated at over 3%. As of 2012 the estimated population of Muslims in Houston was around 63,000. As of today, there are over 209 mosques and storefront religious centers, with the largest being the Al-Noor Mosque (Mosque of Light) of the Islamic Society of Greater Houston (ISGH).

In 2007 Barbara Karkabi of the Houston Chronicle wrote that the Sunni and Shia Muslims "generally enjoy good relations in Houston." The University of Houston has separate student organizations for Sunni Muslims and Shia Muslims, the mostly-Sunni Muslim Students Association and the Shia Association of Muslim Students.

As of 1990 the ISGH served as the main Sunni mosque system in Houston, as in that year it had multiple branches there, and as of 2000, most Sunni mosques in the city are a part of the ISGH. As of 2011 the Al-Noor Society of Greater Houston operates four mosques in Greater Houston.

Culturally, ISGH and the Al-Noor Islamic Society have different views on when to start Ramadan. The former uses the Islamic Society of North America (ISNA) of starting it with the first sighting of the moon in North America while the latter strictly uses the first sighting of the moon in the local Houston area.

== History ==
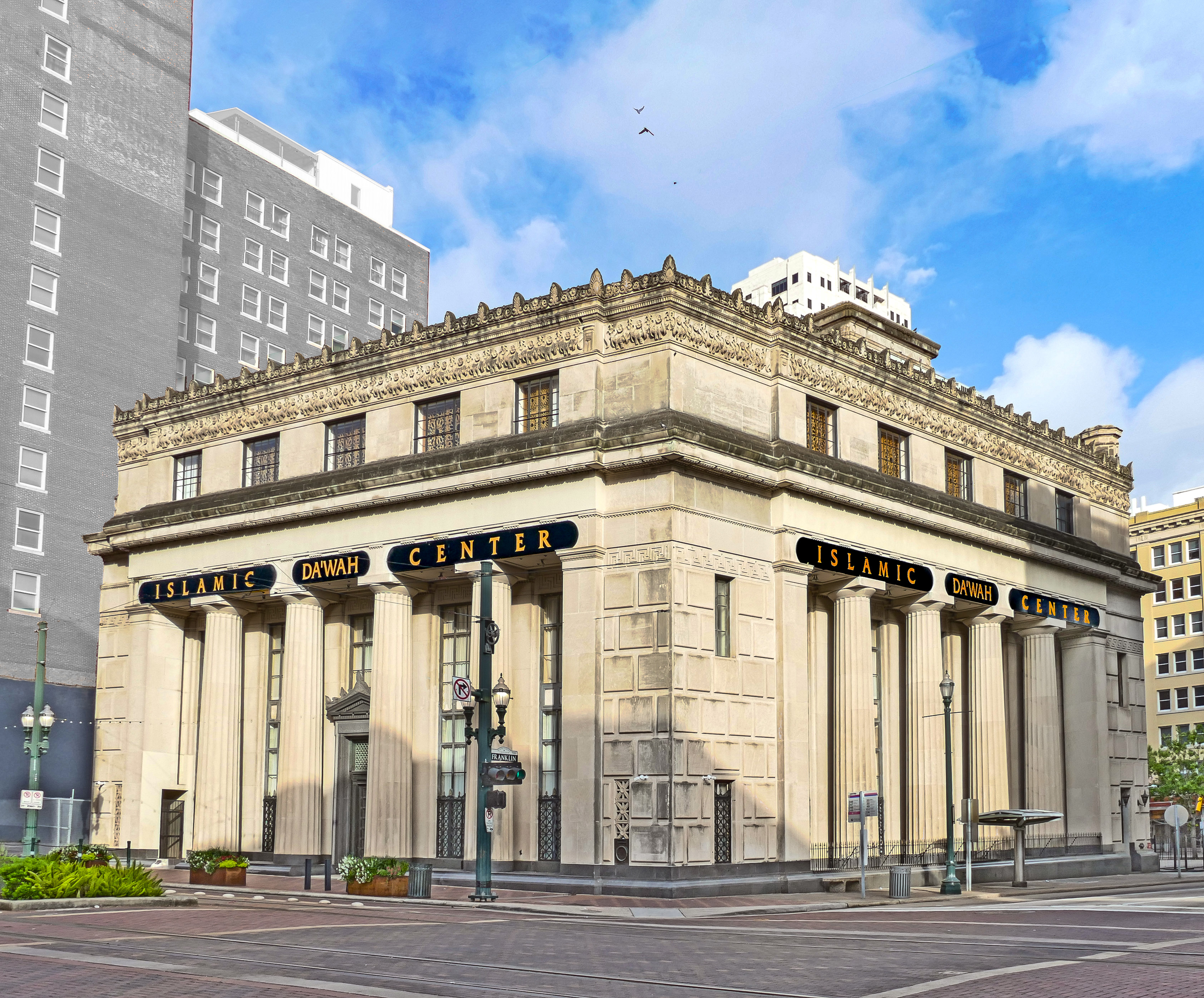
Islamic Da'wah Center in Downtown Houston

In the 1950s a group of Muslims began meeting at a barbershop. This group established Masjid Al-Islam, now the Masjid Warithuddeen Mohammed.

In the 1970s a three-bedroom house in northern Houston was the only mosque in the city, and it served 30 families. Those families pooled funds and purchased a 1.5-acre (0.61 ha) plot of land in late 1980 so a mosque could be built there; the plot was near two major arteries. At first the mosque was in a 1,500-square-foot (140 m^{2}), three bedroom double-wide trailer, purchased for $43,000 ($164098.14 when accounting for inflation). Five families donated money to pay for the down payment, with each family paying $1,500 ($5724.35 when accounting for inflation). Public fundraising dinners and anonymous donations provided the funds for the construction of the permanent Al-Noor mosque.

In 1987 the Al-Noor Society was established.

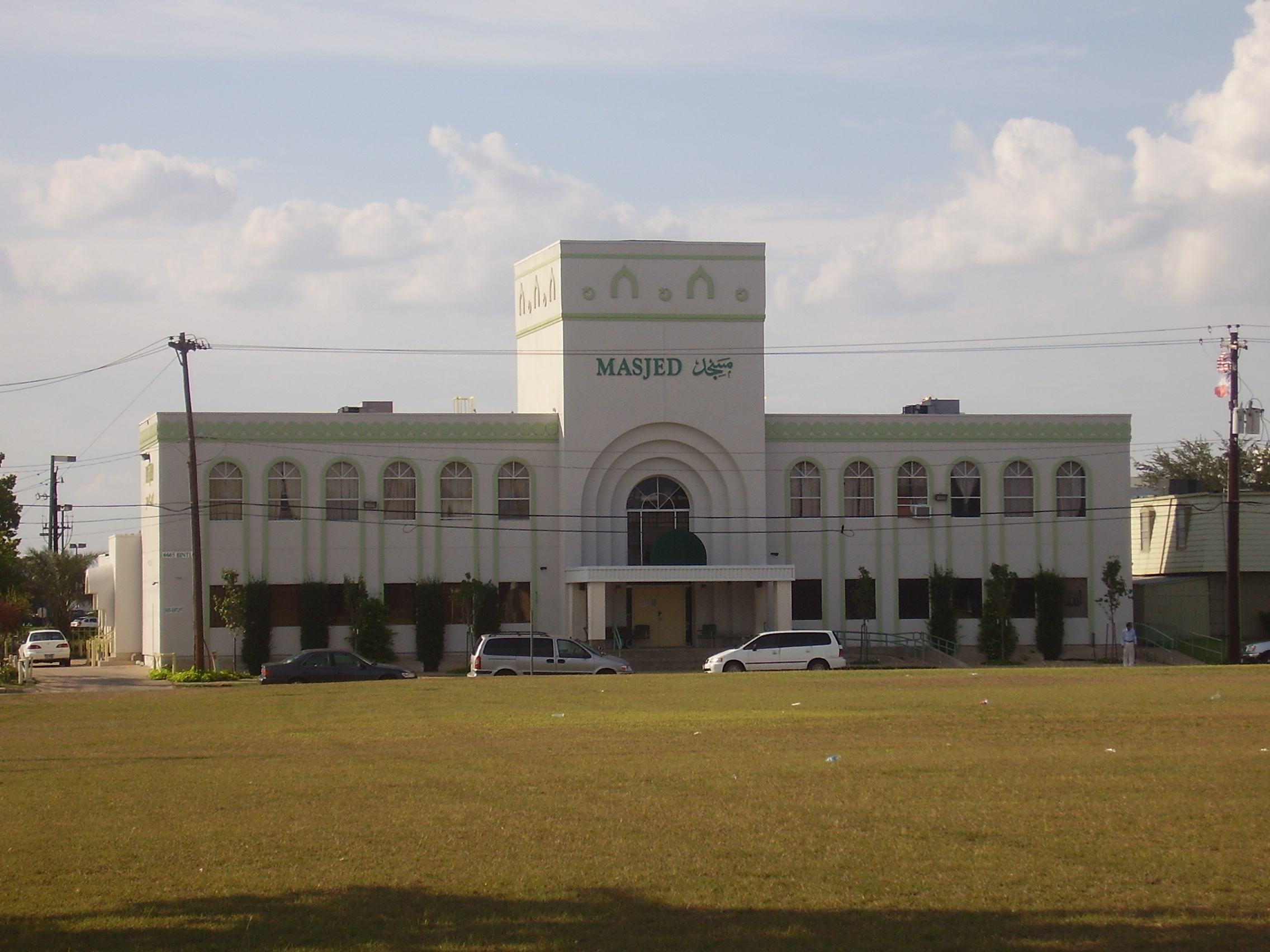
Madrasah Islamiah Masjid Noor in Greater Sharpstown

The Alavi Foundation, a charitable Islamic foundation headquartered in New York City, purchased the property that would become the Islamic Education Center (IEC) for $1.1 million in 1988.

By 2000 some Muslim Iranians who were opposed to fundamentalism in the mosques began attending Zoroastrian events.

In 2009 the Federal Government of the United States attempted to seize over $500 million in assets from the Alavi Foundation, accusing the foundation of being a front for the Government of Iran. The IEC, including Al-Hadi School of Accelerative Learning, was among the assets. Houston-area Shia Muslims criticized the federal government's actions.

In a period of several years before 2012, several new mosques had opened. In the same period, other mosques were expanded.

On Friday February 13, 2015, a fire occurred at the Quba Islamic Institute, located in southeast Houston. Houston Fire Department officials stated that they discovered an accelerant that was used in the fire.

As of 2016, the growth of Islam in the area culminated with a predominantly ethnic background of South Asians, Middle Easterners, Africans, Turks, and Indonesians. As of 2000, over 70% of the Muslims in Houston were of Pakistani origins. As of 2000 most established Muslim immigrants live in north and northwest Houston while most new Muslim immigrants live in Southwest Houston, in particular Alief. As of 1990, the Iranian Shia in Houston primarily used the ISGH mosques for occasional needs including marriages and funerals.

According to Hoda Badr, the author of "Al Noor Mosque: Strength Through Unity," from 1990 to 2000 many Arabs began to create their own mosques and Islamic schools separate from the ISGH due to disagreements over various issues including the language of the Friday sermons, the operations of Sunday schools and full-time schools, and the monetary distribution and collection. In 2000 Badr wrote that Muslims "remain fragmented along ethnic lines" and this is mainly due to increased immigration.

Around 2002 in Houston some Hispanics were converts to Islam. They said that many people mistake them to be of Pakistani or Middle Eastern origin because they are Muslim.

== Varieties of Islam ==
=== Shia Islam ===
There are many Shia mosques in Houston. Some of them are Al-Ghadeer, Al-Murtaza, IPF, IEC, Ahlulbayt, Dar-e-Abbas, and Ali Center. Houston also has one of the largest Juloos in the US organized by Pasban-e-Aza.

==== Ismailism ====
In the 1960s the first large numbers of Ismailis came to Houston to work in the Texas Medical Center. In 2002 there were about 15,000 Ismailis in the Houston area. By 2020 there were about 40,000 Ismailis in the area.

The Ismaili Jamatkhana and Center, which serves as the headquarters of the Ismaili Council for the United States, is located in Sugar Land, along First Colony Boulevard, on a 11.5-acre (4.7 ha) plot of land. The center, built for $10 million and designed by Indian architect Ramesh Khosla, opened in 2002. The Aga Khan, Governor of Texas Rick Perry, Mayor of Sugar Land David Wallace, and other politicians of the State of Texas attended the opening ceremony. The center includes prayer rooms, a cultural center, a conference center, and a gallery of Ismaili art.

In 2006, the Aga Khan Foundation purchased an 11-acre (4.5 ha) plot, including the Robinson Warehouse on Allen Parkway, in order to build an Ismaili Centre. The group planned to demolish the warehouse. The building, designed by Nimmons, Carr & Wright, opened in 1929 as the first Sears store in Houston, but Sears moved out in the 1930s. The Baylor College of Medicine used it temporarily in the 1930s. In the 1950s an individual with a storage business, Arthur Robinson, purchased it for that business. In February 2019, Ismaili Muslims of the Aga Khan Development Network hired architect Farshid Moussavi to construct the Ismaili Center Houston.

The Ismailis annually run the Houston Partnership Walk in order to raise funds for antipoverty initiatives. The Aga Khan Foundation Walk occurs annually as method of creating awareness and funding programs for developing nations around the world, especially in Asia and Africa. It is scheduled to open in 2024.

Some Ismaili Muslims belong to the Dawoodi Bohra sect. Mariya Karimjee, a Bohra Muslim who lived in Houston, wrote that the Houston Bohris were more religious than those in Karachi, her city of origin. Karimjee also stated that "The entire Bohri community in Houston stuck together like glue" since the sect members she was acquainted with "all lived in the same neighborhoods, were concentrated in the same few public schools, and often interacted solely with other Bohris." The Houston Bohri community increased in size during the post-September 11 attacks era.

=== Ahmadiyya ===
Houston has an Ahmadiyya community with a mosque. The mosque is located in northern Harris County.

On Thursday, May 22, 2008, Sheikh Najam Ali ran an advertisement in his newspaper, the Pakistan Times, that stated that the Ahmadiyya were Muslim and that announced an Ahmadiyya celebration. Because of the advertisement, several distribution sites removed his newspapers, several anonymous callers gave him death threats, and several advertisers cancelled their services. In regards to the death threats, Jill Carroll of the Houston Chronicle wrote "Can we just resolve that we will resist death threats to people we don't like, or to people of whom we don't approve, especially in religious matters? Can we just say "no" to death threats or calls for people's death?"

=== Nation of Islam ===
Throughout the area, Greater Houston has at least one Nation of Islam mosque.

== Individual mosques ==
There is one mosque in Downtown Houston, the Islamic Da'wah Center. It is located in a three story building built by Ross S. Sterling. Constructed in 1928, it formerly housed the Houston National Bank. The exterior is made of black granite and limestone. Richard Vara of the Houston Chronicle stated that the building's eight columns are "reminiscent of ancient Greek colonnaded architecture." Gold leaf is used in the high-domed ceiling. Belgian, Portuguese, and Italian-imported marble is used in the interior. Hakeem Olajuwon purchased the building in 1994 so it could be made into a mosque. The treasurer of the facility, Hasan Tulbah, stated that the building initially needed major restoration. California artists did restoration work on the ceiling, which had received rain damage. Both men and women pray on the first floor, with each gender praying in a separate area separated by a screen. The second-floor mezzanine area is used as a prayer area for women. The Islamic library is located in an open bank vault in the basement. The basement also houses a reception hall and kitchen. The building is used as a da'wah center, and Vara wrote that "The building is regarded by the Houston Muslim community as one of the nation's premiere worship centers."

Katy Islamic Center, the largest mosque in Greater Katy, is located in unincorporated Harris County. Operated by the Muslim American Society (MAS), it occupies an 11-acre (4.5 ha) tract with a 20,000-square-foot (1,900 m^{2}) mosque building that is two stories tall. In September 2006 the Katy Islamic Society purchased the tract for $1.1 million ($1715731.26 according to inflation). Around that time some neighbors of the tract reacted negatively. Many cited concerns involving infrastructure such as traffic and drainage. One man threatened to hold pig races, involving animals considered to be forbidden in Islam. Another established a website that had a counter of terrorist attacks that occurred since the September 11 attacks. Construction began in 2008 after MAS acquired the tract, and it opened on June 13, 2015.

The Clear Lake Islamic Center Inc. (CLIC), established in 1996, is the largest mosque in the Clear Lake area.

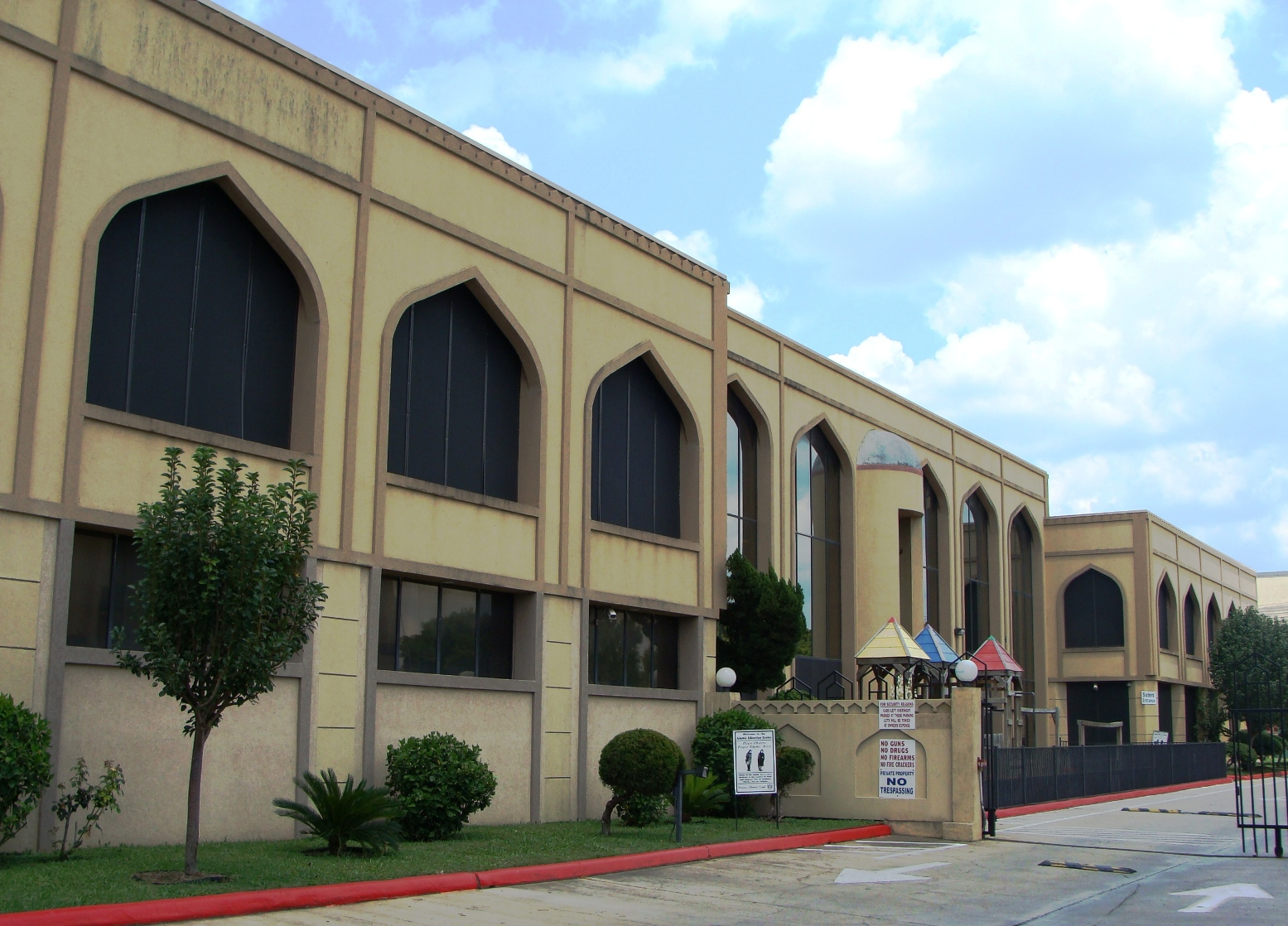
Islamic Education Center in Houston

The Islamic Education Center, in a former Hindu marketplace, is one of the largest Shia mosques in Houston and serves as a majority Shia institution in west Houston. It includes an affiliated in Islamic school, the Al-Hadi School of Accelerative Learning, which opened on January 9, 1996. The Islamic Education Center is owned by the Alvani Foundation. It has been found by the federal government to serve as an illegal funding machine for the Iran regime.

The area's first Spanish-speaking mosque, the Centro Islámico, opened on January 30, 2016. It was the first Spanish-language mosque to open in the United States since the 2005 closure of the storefront mosque of the Alianza Islámica in New York City. The Houston mosque, decorated in a manner similar to that of the Mezquita de Córdoba, is operated by the organization IslamInSpanish.

The Baitus Samee Mosque in Houston's Northside area is also notable.

== Other facilities ==
Of the religious madrassas in the area, as of 2011, the Madrasah Islamia was the first established and the largest.

As of 2000, the sole Muslim funeral home in the State of Texas was located at Al-Noor, and it served Muslims from all of Texas and from several nearby states. As of that year, about 90% of the Houston-area funeral prayers are conducted at Al-Noor due to the location of the funeral home. As of 2000 there were no Muslim cemeteries in Houston, so the Muslims have a special section of a non-Muslim cemetery.

== Economy ==
As of 2014, the Houston area had about 50 halal-certified restaurants. Houston has some restaurants which, during Ramadan, serve iftar meals to families who are too busy to cook.

== Politics ==
M.J. Khan was elected to District F of the Houston City Council, making him the first Muslim to gain a seat on the council. Houston's Muslim community supported his campaign.

In 2021 Pakistani American Yasar Bashir became the first Muslim assistant chief of the Houston Police Department.

== Education ==
The Islamic schools operated by the Islamic Society of Greater Houston are the Darul Arqam Schools. The Islamic Education Center operates the Al-Hadi School of Accelerative Learning. The Iman Academy is an independent Islamic school system.

== LGBTQ affairs ==
In 2022 there were plans to open a mosque which caters to Houston's LGBT communities.

== Notable people ==
- Ghulam Bombaywala - Restaurateur
- Ali Irsan – Convicted and sentenced to death for honor killings
- M.J. Khan – Politician
- Hakeem Olajuwon – Basketball player

== See also ==
- Religion in Houston
- Islam in the United States
- History of Pakistani Americans in Houston
