= Al-Hadi School of Accelerative Learning =

School in Texas, USA

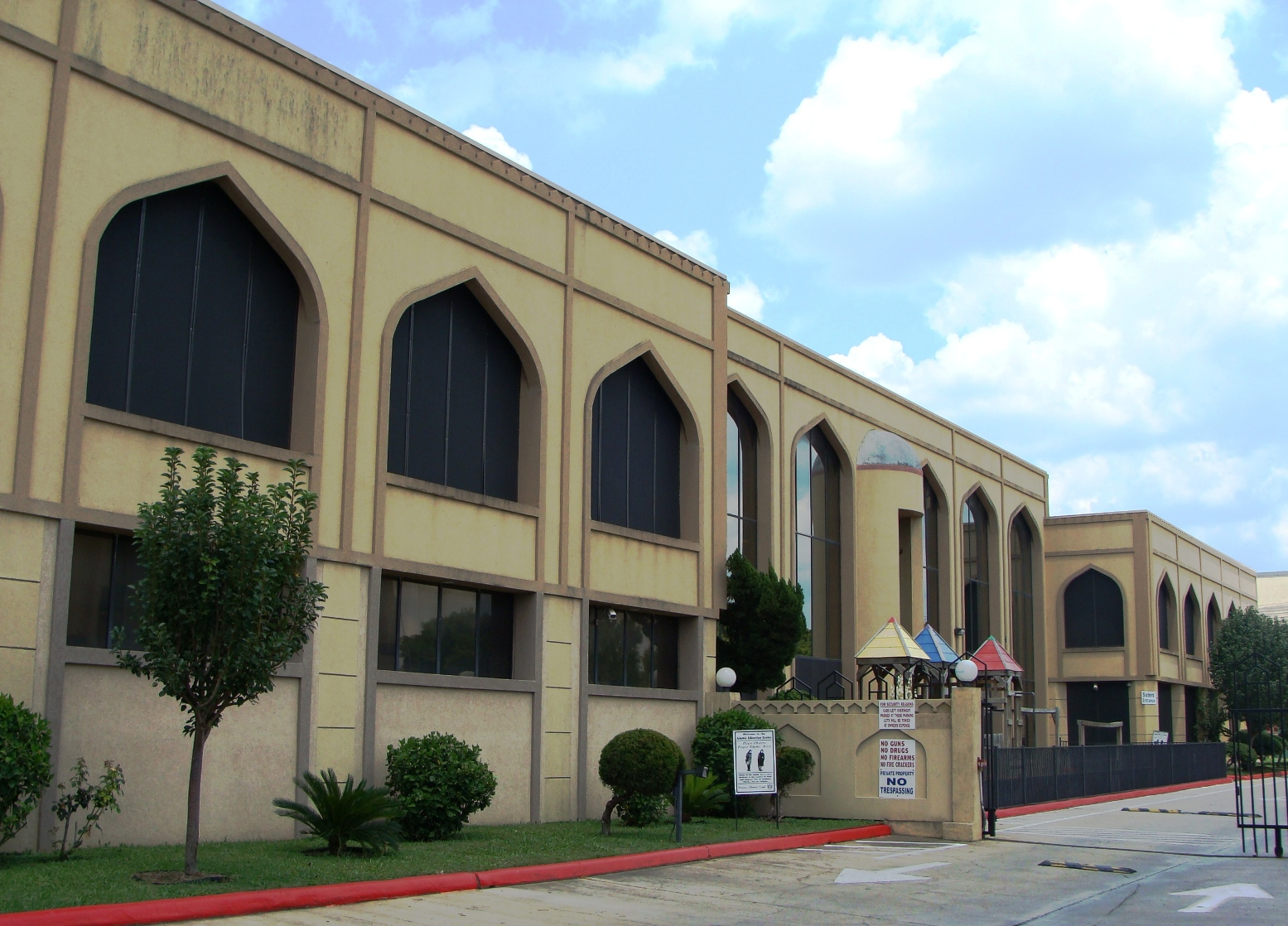
- Islamic Education Center in Houston, which houses Al-Hadi

Location
- 14855 Richmond Avenue; Houston, Texas 77082

Information
- Type: Private School
- Motto: Fighting For a Better Foundation
- Religious affiliation: Islam
- Locale: Urban
- CEEB code: 443542
- NCES School ID: A2371000
- Principal: Seyed Abedi
- Faculty: 20
- Teaching staff: 96.0 (FTE)
- Grades: K-12
- Gender: Coeducational
- Enrollment: 498 (2023-2024)
  - Pre-kindergarten: 84
  - Kindergarten: 35
  - Grade 1: 37
  - Grade 2: 40
  - Grade 3: 40
  - Grade 4: 33
  - Grade 5: 35
  - Grade 6: 38
  - Grade 7: 35
  - Grade 8: 31
  - Grade 9: 38
  - Grade 10: 18
  - Grade 11: 20
  - Grade 12: 14
- Student to teacher ratio: 4.3
- Hours in school day: 7.3
- Colors: Blue and White
- Athletics: Yes
- Accreditation: Southern Association of Colleges and Schools
- Website: www.alhadi.com

The Al-Hadi School of Accelerative Learning (AHS) is an Islamic primary and secondary school in Southwest Houston, Texas. The school is founded by Nasser Biria and is located on the premises of the Islamic Education Center of Greater Houston (IEC) of Houston, which also houses one of the largest mosques in Houston. According to Faheem Kazimi, the chairperson of the IEC, it is a Houston-area school that runs on tuition fees that comes from the students ranging to $5000. The school is near Westheimer Road.

== History ==
The Alavi Foundation, a charitable Islamic foundation headquartered in New York City, purchased the property that would become the IEC for $1.1 million in 1988. In March 1995 a "Full-Time School Committee" formed with the intent of establishing a year-round Islamic primary and secondary school in Greater Houston. The Al-Hadi School opened on January 9, 1996. Between 1997 and 2004 the Alavi Foundation made $285,000 worth of improvements to the IEC property. In 2001 the Southern Association of Colleges and Schools accredited the school. The first class of high school seniors graduated in 2003.

In 2009 the Federal Government of the United States attempted to seize over $500 million in assets from the Alavi Foundation, accusing the foundation of being a front for the Government of Iran. The IEC, including Al-Hadi School, was among the assets. The IEC property had a brief mention in the federal lawsuit. The federal government did not file any allegations of wrongdoing of workers and worshipers at the IEC mosque. Houston-area Shia Muslims criticized the federal government's actions. As the federal lawsuit unfolded, the Islamic school continued to operate.

== Demographics ==
As of 2023, about 400 (future: expected 750) students attend the school. Most of the students are bilingual, with several languages represented in the student body.

In 2007 the school had 310 students. Most of the students were Shia. About 25% of the students were Sunni, and two families sending children to the school were not Muslim.

== See also ==
- Islam in Houston
- Nasser Biria
- Ali
- Mahdi
- Alireza Abedi
