= Kegg's Candies =

Texas confectionary company

- Type: Private Closed Permanently 31 July 2020
- Industry: Confectionery
- Founded: Houston, TX (1946)
- Defunct: 2018
- Headquarters: Houston, Texas
- Products: Chocolate, candies, Pecan, Custards
- Website: keggscandies.com

Kegg's Candies was a confectionery company that specialized in handmade chocolates. It was located in Houston, Texas, and was called "legendary" by the local press. The company was founded in 1946 by Robert Kegg. Upon his retirement in the 1980s, the business stayed in the Kegg's family for 10 years and then was sold to John Toomey, a Houston businessman. Carl Bartuch Jr. bought the business from Toomey in 2004.

In 2009, the company bought a new facility in Southwest Houston that covers 11,000 square feet, five times the size of their previous location. The company makes 30,000 to 40,000 pounds of candy each year, and creates handmade items.

The company shut down its factory and ceased operations in 2018.
