= History of Pakistani Americans in Houston =

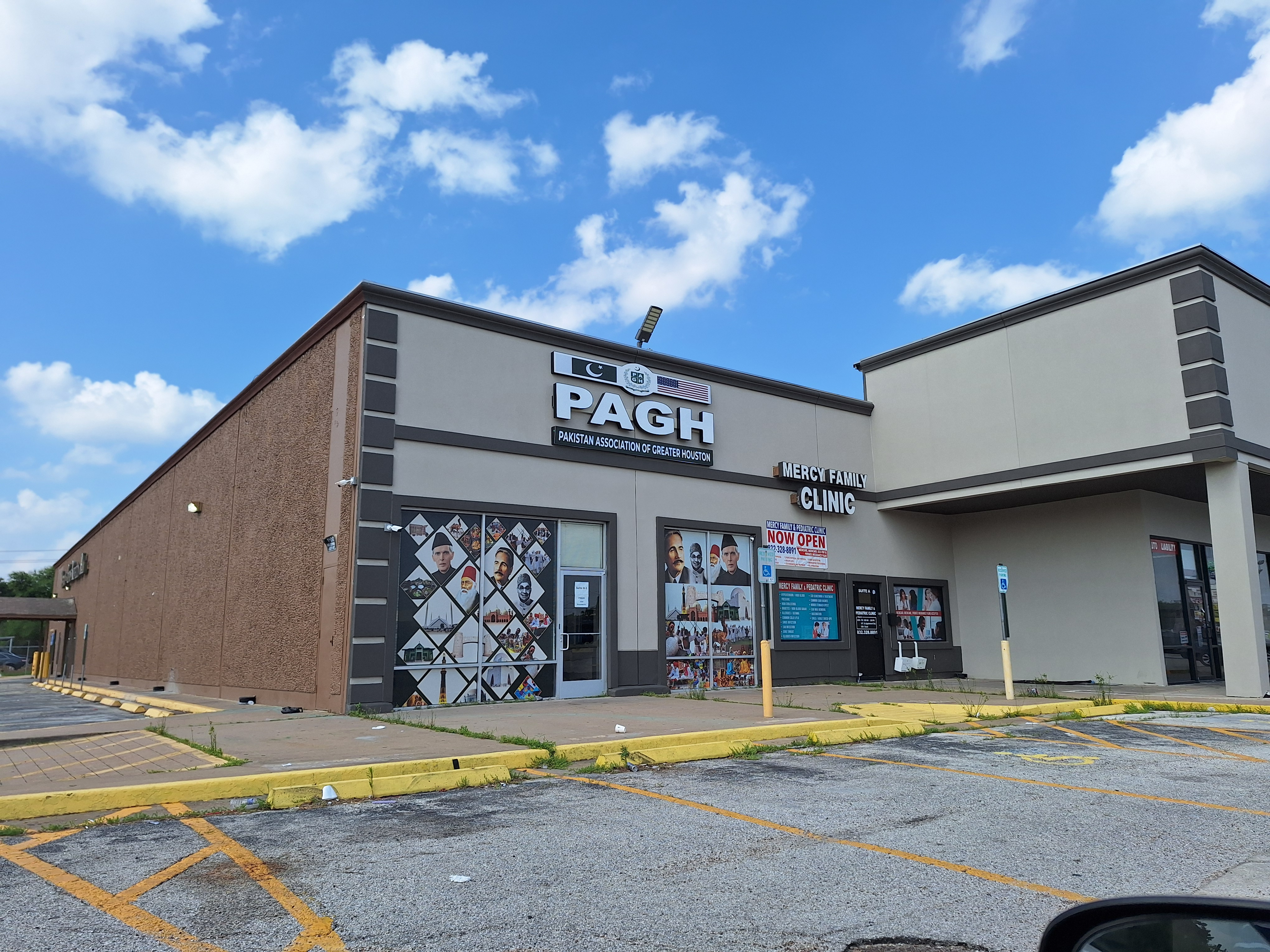
Pakistan Association of Greater Houston offices, which include the Pakistani American Community Center

As of the 2010 U.S. census the number of people in the Houston area of Pakistani origin was counted as 27,856. As of 2000, over 70% of the Muslims in Houston are Pakistani or Indian.

== History ==
In 2001 a woman being questioned by an off-duty sheriff's deputy about a theft at a grocery store in northwest Houston fell ill and died. Afterwards, the Pakistan Association of Greater Houston, the Islamic Society of Greater Houston (ISGH), and the Council of American Islamic Relations (CAIR) were scheduled to form a committee about the incident.

On May 23, 2004 Pakistan International Airlines (PIA) was scheduled to begin flights to Karachi from Houston on a twice weekly basis. The passengers stayed on the aircraft while it took refueling stops in Manchester, England. In April 2005 a Houston attorney named Syed Izfar accused officers of the U.S. Customs and Border Protection (CBP) at George Bush Intercontinental Airport of profiling customers of the PIA flight. PIA regional manager Munsif Ansari argued that CBP officers "are pretty reasonable. In fact, the feedback I've heard from people is that they were being treated very well." In July of that year, Ghulam Bombaywala, the head of the Pakistan Association of Greater Houston, stated that the security presence for the Pakistan flights at Houston was too intimidating and that the security officials at Bush Intercontinental should make it less intimidating.

In the mid-2000s Bombaywala had a conflict with Houston City Council member M.J. Khan. After the 2005 Kashmir earthquake, the two men organized separate relief efforts instead of doing a joint effort. The PAGH, under Bombaywala, collected over $8,000 ($13187.94 according to inflation) by October 10 of that year. In December 2005 Bombaywala stated that the Pakistani community had 60,000 people and that the community donated over $1 million ($1648492.08 according to inflation) to the earthquake relief efforts.

In 2006 Bombaywala filed for Chapter 7 bankruptcy, and Edward Hegstrom of the Houston Chronicle stated that this increased the discord in the Houston Pakistani community.

When Pervez Musharraf, President of Pakistan, established martial law there in 2007, Houstonians of Pakistani origins protested. That year, the Pakistani community expressed sadness after Benazir Bhutto was assassinated. After Musharraf resigned in 2008, Jemimah Noonoo of the Houston Chronicle stated that the reaction from the Pakistani community in Houston "was mixed".

The Pakistani community is described as fairly prosperous, with many doctors, engineers and businesspeople. A large number of gas stations in Houston are owned by Pakistanis.

== Economy ==
Pakistanis in Houston include owners of small and large businesses as well as computer software/hardware engineers and medical professionals. Smaller businesses include convenience stores, gas stations, and restaurants; while larger businesses are related to the fields of information technology, manufacturing, real estate, and textiles.

As of 2001 the city had at least 20 Pakistani restaurants.

== Demographics ==
As of 2001 Southwest Houston and Sugar Land had large numbers of persons of Pakistani origin, while the numbers of the group in Clear Lake City and northern Houston were increasing.

== Institutions ==
=== Pakistani American Community Center ===
The Pakistani American Community Center is in Alief, near Bissonnet and Dairy Ashford. The center includes seven retail spaces, a small library, a 16,000-square-foot (1,500 m^{2}) banquet hall, a clinic for low-income individuals, and prayer halls. The center offers after-school activities. As of January 2007, six of the retail spaces were rented out for an average rent of $1 ($1.55 according to inflation) per month.

In August 2005 the PAGH purchased a former H-E-B for $1.3 million. The PAGH had originally purchased land in Southwest Houston for the purpose of building a center, but after Ghulam Bombaywala became the president, he had the land sold and purchased the H-E-B, using the funds from the land sale. Some Pakistanis disagreed with the idea of using the community center for business purposes and taking out a loan to have the H-E-B revamped. On June 23, 2007, the Pakistani American Community Center opened. Members of the association and invited guests attended the ceremony. The guests included Consul-General of Pakistan in Houston Ghulam Rasul Baluch; Sheila Jackson-Lee; Ronald Green, a Houston City Council member; Nick Lampson; Al Green; and John F. Healey Jr., the Fort Bend County District Attorney. A Congressional Certificate of Recognition stating that the building was "the first Pakistani community center in the nation" was presented by Al Green.

=== Consulate-General of Pakistan ===
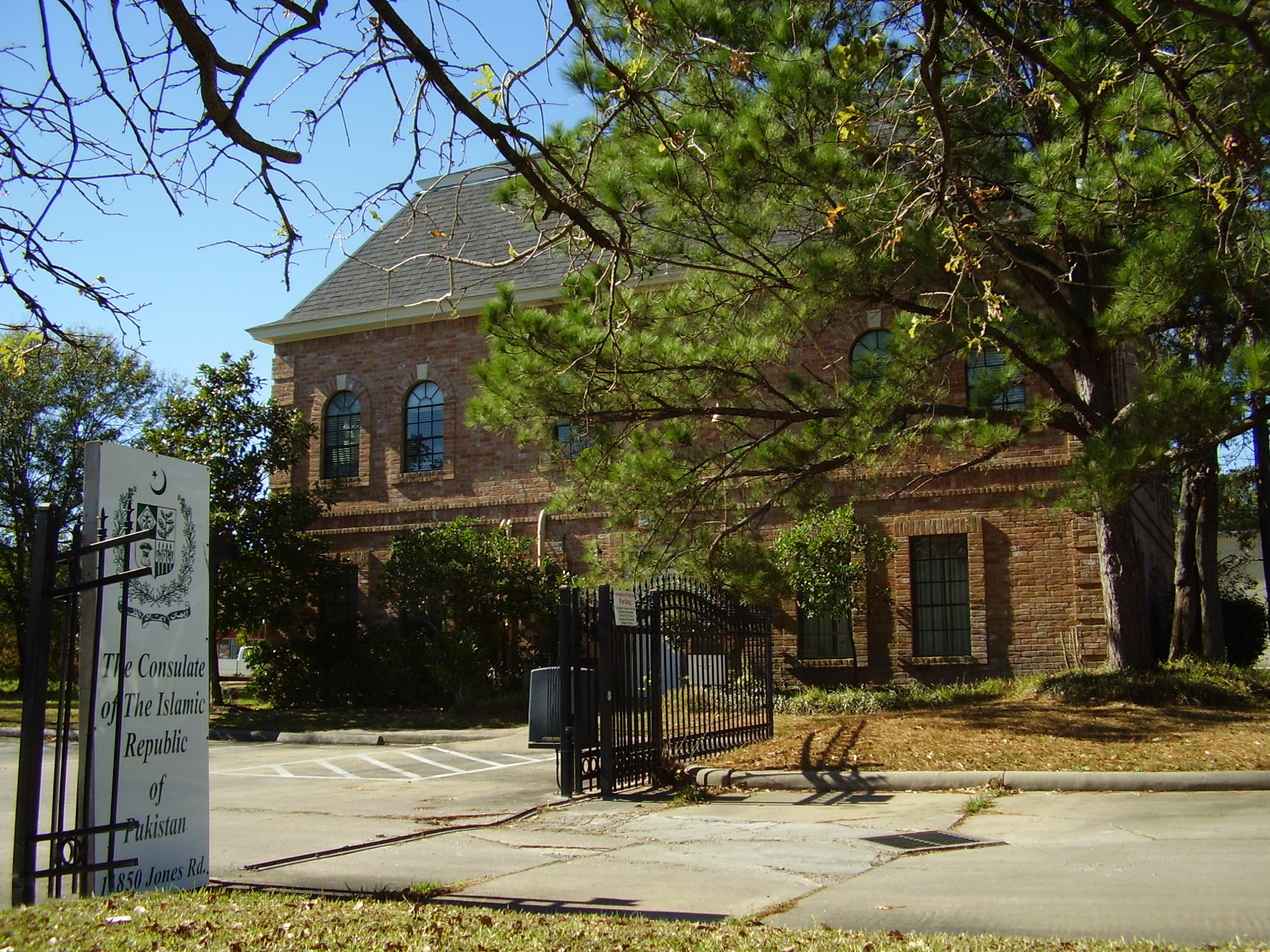
Consulate-General of Pakistan in Houston

The Consulate-General of Pakistan is located in the 11850 Jones Road property in unincorporated Harris County, northwest of Downtown Houston. The consulate serves residents of Texas, Arkansas, Louisiana, New Mexico, Colorado, Mississippi, Alabama, Georgia, Florida, and Oklahoma. The 11850 Jones Road property, near the intersection of Jones Road and Greencreek Drive, is managed by the real estate company Transwestern. The 20,534.00-square-foot (1,907.671 m^{2}), $1,125,500 United States dollar building was built in 1984. The property includes 20,534 square feet (1,907.7 m^{2}) of land and 7,232 square feet (671.9 m^{2}) of office space with twelve private offices, two conference rooms with fireplaces, and a private bath on the third floor. The building received upgrades in 2001. The consulate opened in June 2004. After the Assassination of Benazir Bhutto in 2007 the consulate provided a book for recording condolences for Benazir Bhutto. In 2008 Pakistan's National Accountability Bureau issued a reference against an employee of the consulate, accusing him of issuing forged passports.

== Media ==
Pakistan Post, with U.S. operations headquartered in New York City, has an office in Houston.

As of 2001 the radio channels KGOL-AM and KILE-AM host a program discussing South Asian affairs.

== Sports and recreation ==
In September 2018 a cricket complex in Prairie View was scheduled to open. It was established by Pakistani American Tanweer Ahmed.

== Notable residents ==
- Ghulam Bombaywala (restaurateur)
- M.J. Khan (Houston City Council member)
- Mariyah Moten

== See also ==
- Islam in Houston
- Pakistani community of London
