= James Coney Island =

American restaurant chain

James Coney Island, Inc.

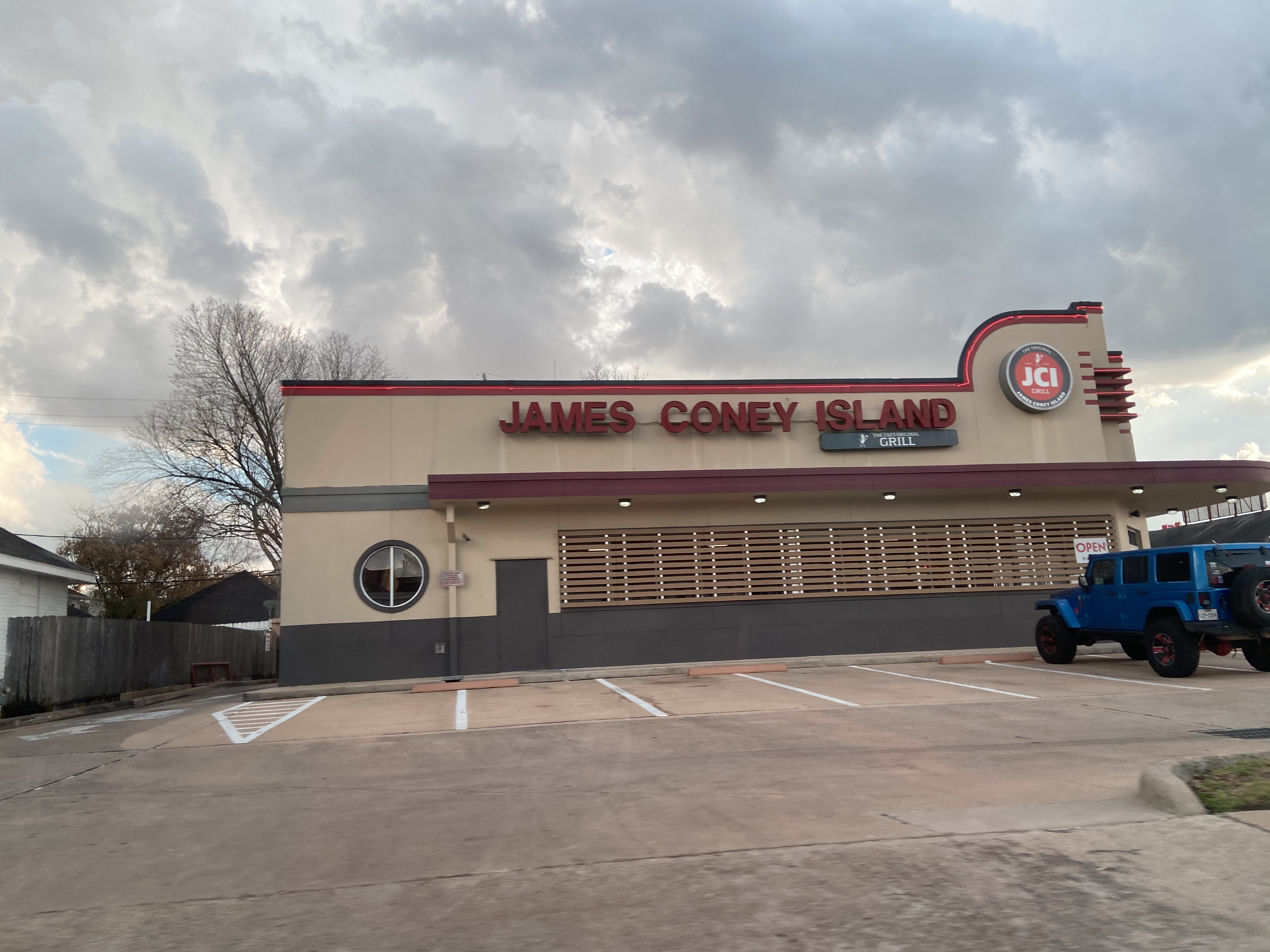
- James Coney Island Shepherd in Houston
- Type: Private
- Industry: Fast food
- Founded: 1923
- Founder: James Papadakis; Tom Papadakis
- Headquarters: Houston, Texas, United States
- Number of locations: 5
- Key people: Darrin Straughan (President)
- Products: Hot dogs (Coney Island hot dogs), Hamburgers, French fries, Milkshakes, Soft drinks
- Website: www.jamesconeyisland.com

James Coney Island, Inc. is a chain of fast food restaurants that specializes in Coney Island hot dogs. It has its headquarters, the James Coney Island Support Center, located in Suite 700 in the 11111 Katy Freeway building in Houston.

== History ==
The company was founded in 1923 by two Greek immigrant brothers, James and Tom Papadakis; the former being the company's namesake. The original James Coney Island restaurant was one of the first major hot dog vendors in Houston.

The business was family-owned and operated from its inception until 1990, when the failure of the family's auto dealerships led to the restaurants being acquired out of bankruptcy court by Ghulam Bombaywala, Irvin Kaplan, Donald Bonham, Edwin Freedman, and Max Levit and Milton Levit.

The location in Downtown Houston opened in 1923. In 2010, the chain announced that the location was closing after a dispute with the landlord of 815 Dallas, the building housing the location. The chain previously had a location in Downtown at 1011 Walker, which served as the number one location of the chain. The 1011 Walker location opened in 1923; previously the restaurant was located in a smaller facility on Rusk Street. The chain's number two location opened in the Town & Country Mall area in 1968, and permanently closed its doors in 2020. In 1993, the 1011 Walker location closed after the restaurant management discovered that the building was being condemned by the city, in favor of building a high rise on the property. As of February 2021, the chain had 17 locations.

In August 2021, the 4320 W Sam Houston Pkwy and Clay location closed after operating since 2008. In March 2022 the location in Meadows Place closed after operating there for over 25 years. In July 2022, the company closed the long standing South Shepherd location.

== See also ==
- Cuisine of Houston
