= M.J. Khan =

Masrur Javed "M.J." Khan (born May 1, 1950) is a Pakistani American and former Houston City Council member.

== Early life ==
Khan, born in Pakistan, arrived in the United States in 1976 to attend the University of Illinois. From there he received a master's degree in engineering. He had lived in New York for a period and had plans to settle in New Jersey. Khan's wife, cardiologist Dr. Attiya Khan, was offered a fellowship in Houston. He arrived in Houston in 1980, and received a Master of Business Administration (MBA) degree from Rice University. Khan became a U.S. citizen in 1985.

== Career ==
Khan became an owner of gas stations and a real estate developer. He sat on the board of the Islamic Society of Greater Houston (ISGH) and once served as president of the Pakistan Association of Greater Houston (PAGH). In 2003 he was elected to the District F post of the Houston City Council, gaining 53.2% of the vote against Terry McConn. This made him the first Muslim on city council. The turnout was higher in this election for District F compared to previous ones.

In the mid-2000s Khan had a conflict with the then-PAGH head Ghulam Bombaywala. After the 2005 Kashmir earthquake, the two men organized separate relief efforts instead of doing a joint effort.

In 2009 there was an election for the City Controller of Houston to succeed Annise Parker. Ronald Green, who was also a member of the city council, defeated Khan in the runoff election.

In December 2014, Khan was elected president of the Islamic Society of Greater Houston (ISGH), defeating Hashim Badat.

Khan announced a campaign for Mayor of Houston in the November, 2023 election to succeed Sylvester Turner.

== Personal life ==
As of 2009 M.J. Khan owns a real estate development company and Attiya works for the Texas Heart Institute as a cardiology fellow. Khan stated that his official residence is a condominium in Southwest Houston, and his wife has a residence in Piney Point Village. Khan and his wife have one son.

== See also ==
- History of the Pakistani-Americans in Houston
- Islam in Houston

Civic offices
Preceded by Mark Ellis	Member of Houston City Council from District F January 2, 2004–January 1, 2010	Succeeded by Al Hoang
