= Al Hoang =

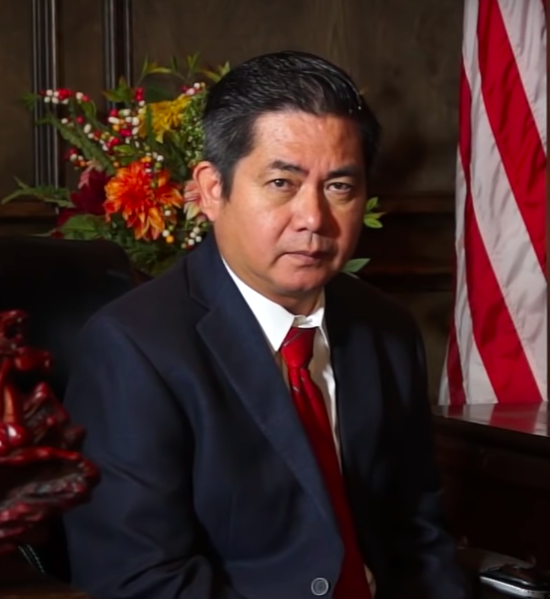
- Born: Hoàng Duy Hùng; May 19, 1962 (age 64); Ninh Thuận, South Vietnam
- Occupation: Lawyer
- Years active: 1992–
- Spouse: Diana Bích-Hằng Nguyễn (m. 1994–2020) Lê Thị Kim Ngân (m. 2022)
- Children: 2 daughters, 1 son
- Website: Trang YouTube chính thức {{URL|example.com|optional display text}}

Al Hoang (born 1962) is a former member of the Houston City Council. Prior to his election to that office, Hoang worked as a criminal defense lawyer. He had previously served as a president of the Vietnamese Community of Houston and Vicinities (VNCH). He was the first Vietnamese American member of the city council.

== Biography ==
Hoang was born in Phan Rang, South Vietnam on May 19, 1962. He was one of ten brothers and sisters, and his parents had originated from Nghệ An, North Vietnam but moved to South Vietnam in 1954. He came to the United States after the 1975 Fall of Saigon.

His family initially settled in Reading, Pennsylvania through Catholic church sponsorship. He lived in Carthage, Missouri before ultimately moving to Houston. He attended the University of Houston beginning in 1983 and studied Philosophy, graduating in 1989. In 1996 he received a Juris Doctor degree from the Thurgood Marshall School of Law at Texas Southern University and began his law practices one year later. He became the president of Vietnamese Community of Houston & Vicinities in 2007.

== Career ==
Hoang won the District F position after a November 3, 2009, election and a runoff election against Mike Laster on December 12 of the same year. His scheduled swearing in date was January 4, 2010.

In 2011, he had an election against Hoc Thai Nguyen.

In 2013, Richard Nguyen defeated Hoang in the election for the District F seat. Mike Tolson of the Houston Chronicle stated that animosity towards Hoang had built up among Vietnamese partly because he had made a trip to Vietnam, now under Communist rule, in 2010; older Vietnamese who fled after the Fall of Saigon still had negative feelings towards the Communists. Tolson also stated that perceptions that Hoang acted in a condescending manner towards the Vietnamese community and unproven accusations had also damaged his standing. The Houston Chronicle editorial department had recommended Hoang's reelection for the 2013 City Council election.

== Personal life ==
He is married to Hang Nguyen from 2009 to 2020. He resides in Pearland.

In 2022, Al was reported by Vietnamese press that he bought an apartment in Ho Chi Minh City after he heard an advice from retired diplomat and former Vice-Minister of Foreign Affairs Nguyễn Thanh Sơn.

Civic offices
Preceded by M.J. Khan	Member of Houston City Council from District F January 1, 2010 – January 1, 2016	Succeeded by Steve Le
