= Islamic Education Institute of Texas =

American schools network

Islamic Education Institute of Texas / Darul Arqam Schools

Location
- Houston, Texas United States

District information
- Type: Private school
- Motto: Preparing our students to excel as Muslim role models and exemplary citizens in today's diverse society.
- Grades: PreK–12
- Established: 1992
- Superintendent: Afaq Durrani
- Schools: 6 (2018)

Students and staff
- Students: 1,190
- Staff: 145

Other information
- Website: ieitschools.org

The Islamic Education Institute of Texas (IEIT) is a network of Islamic schools in Greater Houston, Texas, United States. The organization is a subsidiary of the Islamic Society of Greater Houston (ISGH). IEIT is headquartered in Southwest Management District (formerly Greater Sharpstown) in Houston.

IEIT, as Darul Arqam, began as a full-time PreK-3 school located in two mobile homes in 1992, with 33 students and 8 faculty members. In 2004 it had over 300 students total. It is a PreK-12 school system.

== Campuses ==
Campuses in Houston

Each of the six campuses is located at a particular ISGH mosque:

- Darul Arqam School North (unincorporated Harris County) - Located at Masjid Bilal (Adel Road Islamic Center), it opened in 1992 and serves grades PreK-12. In 2004 it had 175 students, with 19 in senior high school. As of 2019 it has more than 300 students.
- Darl Arqam School Southeast Campus (Houston) - Located at Masjid Abu-Bakr (Highway 3 Islamic Center), it opened in 1992 and serves early childhood to grade 3.
- Everest Academy (a.k.a. Darul Arqam School South) (Stafford) Located at Masjid Al-Sabireen (Brand Lane Islamic Center), it opened in 2005 and serves grades PreK-8.
- Darul Arqam Southwest (Alief, Houston, near Sugar Land) - Located at Masjid At-Taqwa (Synott Islamic Center), it opened in 1993 and serves early childhood through grade 8. The school closed in 2021.
- ILM Academy (Houston) - Located at the Spring Branch Islamic Center, it opened in 2006 and serves early childhood through grade 8.
- Houston Peace Academy (HPA) (unincorporated Harris County) - Located at Masjid Al-Salam (Champions Islamic Center), which has a Spring mailing address, it opened in 2010 and serves early childhood to 5th grade.

== Athletics ==
As of 2004 middle school grades participate in the Private School Interscholastic Association's events, while there is no athletic association for high school grades.

In 2004 Darul Arqam submitted an application to join the Texas Association of Private and Parochial Schools (TAPPS), a private school athletic association which includes several Christian private schools. Khaled Katbi, who represented the school, had a meeting with TAPPS on November 4, 2004, and did not report any unusual questions. However the school subsequently received a letter which included a questionnaire with "Why do you wish to join an organization whose membership is basically in total disagreement with your religious beliefs?" and "Why do you think that the current member schools of TAPPS will not be biased against your school, based on the fundamental difference in your religion and Christianity, since about 90% of TAPPS schools embrace Christianity?" In response the American Civil Liberties Union of Texas stated that TAPPS should be investigated.

== See also ==
- Islam in Houston
