= Government National College, Karachi =

College in Karachi, Pakistan

- گورنمنٹ نیشنل کالج ، کراچی
- Type: Public
- Affiliations: University of Karachi
- Principal: Mr.Gulzar Ali Memon
- Location: Karachi, Sindh, Pakistan
- Website: archived

Government National College, Karachi is a college in Karachi, Pakistan.

Government National College (Urdu: گورنمنٹ نیشنل کالج ، کراچی) is a college of Karachi being run under one roof, with all the three faculties of science, arts and commerce up to degree level being affiliated with the University of Karachi.

Government of Sindh, with the concept that information technology education should come within the reach of common people, introduced a three-year Bachelor in Computer Science program in ten public sector colleges of the province in 2001. Government National College, Karachi was also selected for this program.

== History ==
The National Educational Society established the school as the National College, with Hasan Adil, M.M. Malik, Hasnain Kazmi, Shamsul Haq and the efforts of Kardar who especially helped to get the land for education purpose from the government. The school was established from the home of Hasan Adil in Karachi. He had managed to obtain the services of scholar, Shamsul Haq, who, along with the other founding members, waived their salaries in the interest of establishing the school for the benefit of the local community. Hasan Adil served as the first head from March 1956 to March 1973. Originally the school had co-educational system and a "double shift". On 1 September 1972, the Pakistani government nationalised the school. After nationalization, Syed Imtiaz Hussain, head of Chemistry Department of this college took the charge of Principal. Under his principalship, the College was playing a vital role in the education of people from Karachi.

== Campus ==
The campus is between Alamgir Road and Shaheed-e-Millat Road, in the Karachi Memon Co-operative Housing Society, Gulshan-e-Iqbal Town, Union Council UC-02 in District East.

== Auditorium ==
There is a large, centrally located auditorium named after Sir Syed Ahmad Khan, a renowned educationist and the founder of Aligarh Muslim University, Aligarh.

== Library ==
The campus library is a two-story building, the upper story of which serves as a place for researchers. The lower story serves as a reading hall for students.

== Notable alumni ==
- Imran Ismail, former Governor of Sindh, Pakistan
- Ghulam Bombaywala, (business entrepreneur in Houston, Texas)
- Bilal Maqsood, Pakistani singer, songwriter and guitarist.
- Faisal Kapadia, Pakistani singer
