= Irvin Kaplan =

American businessman (1927 – 1994)

Irvin Deutser Kaplan (November 18, 1927 – January 18, 1994) was an American businessman who was the majority owner of the Houston Rockets of the National Basketball Association and the Houston Aeros of the World Hockey Association.

Kaplan was president of United Foods, a Houston-based frozen food processor and grain warehousing company, from 1960 to 1968. In 1973, Kaplan purchased controlling interest in the Houston Rockets for $1.1 million. He also owned 32% of the Houston Aeros and exercised an option to obtain controlling interest in the team shortly after buying the Rockets. He sold the Aeros to an investor group led by George Bolin in 1975.

On June 10, 1975, Kaplan filed for Chapter 11 bankruptcy protection. He listed about $14.1 million in liabilities to 46 different creditors. Three months later he sold the Rockets to a group of minority stockholders headed by Wayne Duddlesten and Ray Patterson. On September 5, 1975, Kaplan was indicted for fraud in connection with the purchase of $3 million in corporate and state bonds. He pleaded no contest and received an eight-year prison sentence that was suspended on the condition he pay back the brokerage houses. On January 11, 1977, Kaplan settled his debts with four securities firms (Weeden & Co., Lehman Brothers, Kidder, Peabody & Company, and Cowen & Co.) after the creditors agreed to take ownership of a Houston-based automobile, truck, and equipment leasing firm.

In 1989, Kaplan, Ghulam Bombaywala, and Doris Katz opened Gugenheim's, a Jewish deli located in Houston. In 1990, Kaplan, Bombaywala, Donald Bonham, Edwin Freedman, and Max Levit and Milton Levit acquired James Coney Island out of bankruptcy court. Kaplan died on January 18, 1994.
