= The Fresh Market =

American chain of supermarkets

The Fresh Market, Inc.

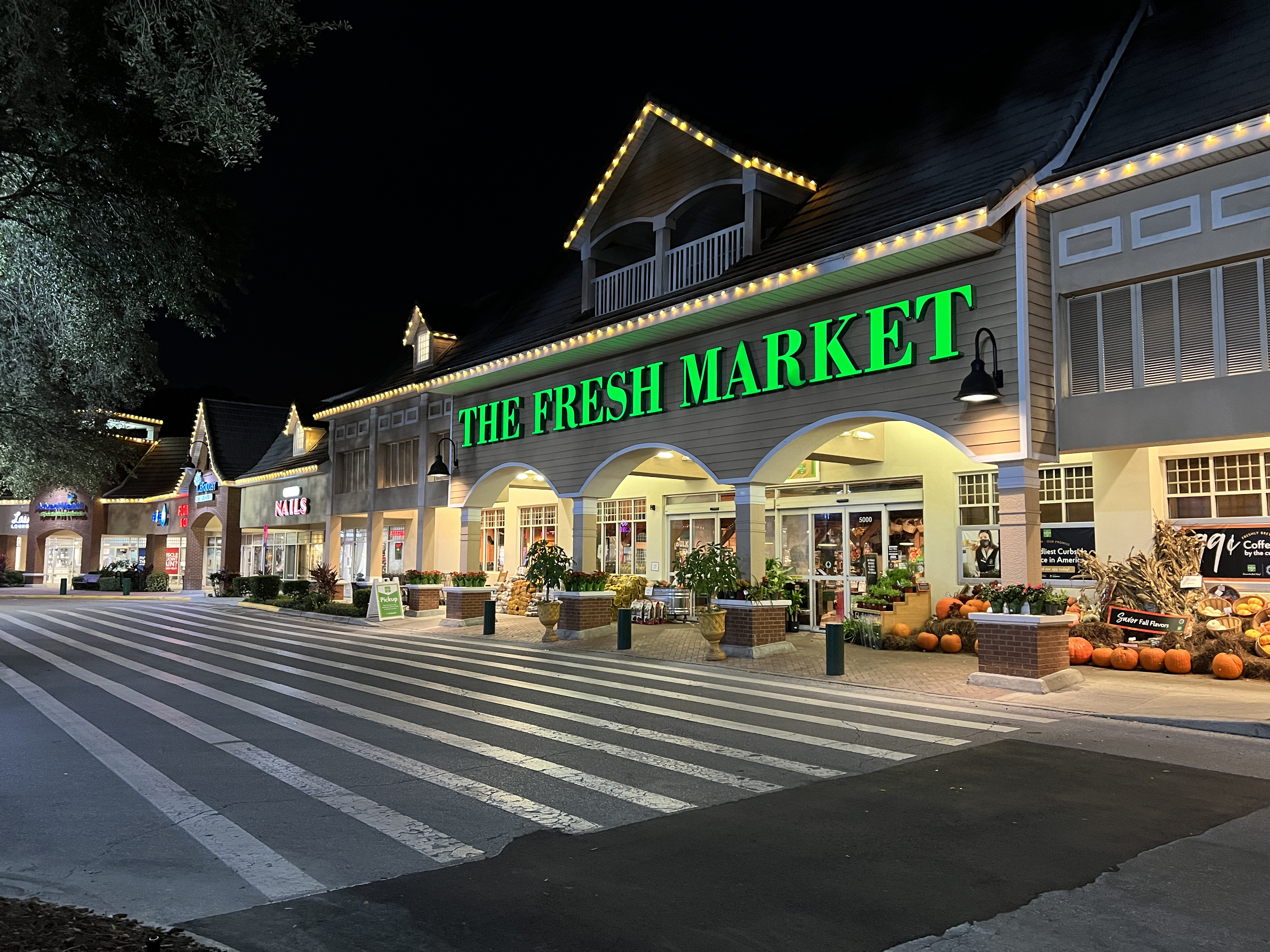
- Storefront in Dr. Phillips, Florida
- Company type: Private
- Traded as: Nasdaq: TFM
- Industry: Retail
- Founded: March 5, 1982; 44 years ago
- Founders: Ray Berry; Beverly Berry
- Headquarters: Greensboro, North Carolina, U.S.
- Number of locations: 160 (all in US)
- Area served: Southeastern U.S. Mid Atlantic U.S. Midwest
- Key people: Brian Johnson (CEO)
- Products: Food
- Services: Online shopping and home delivery
- Revenue: US$1.9 billion (2024)
- Owner: Cencosud
- Number of employees: 13,000
- Website: www.thefreshmarket.com

The Fresh Market, Inc. is an American chain of supermarkets based in Greensboro, North Carolina.

== History ==
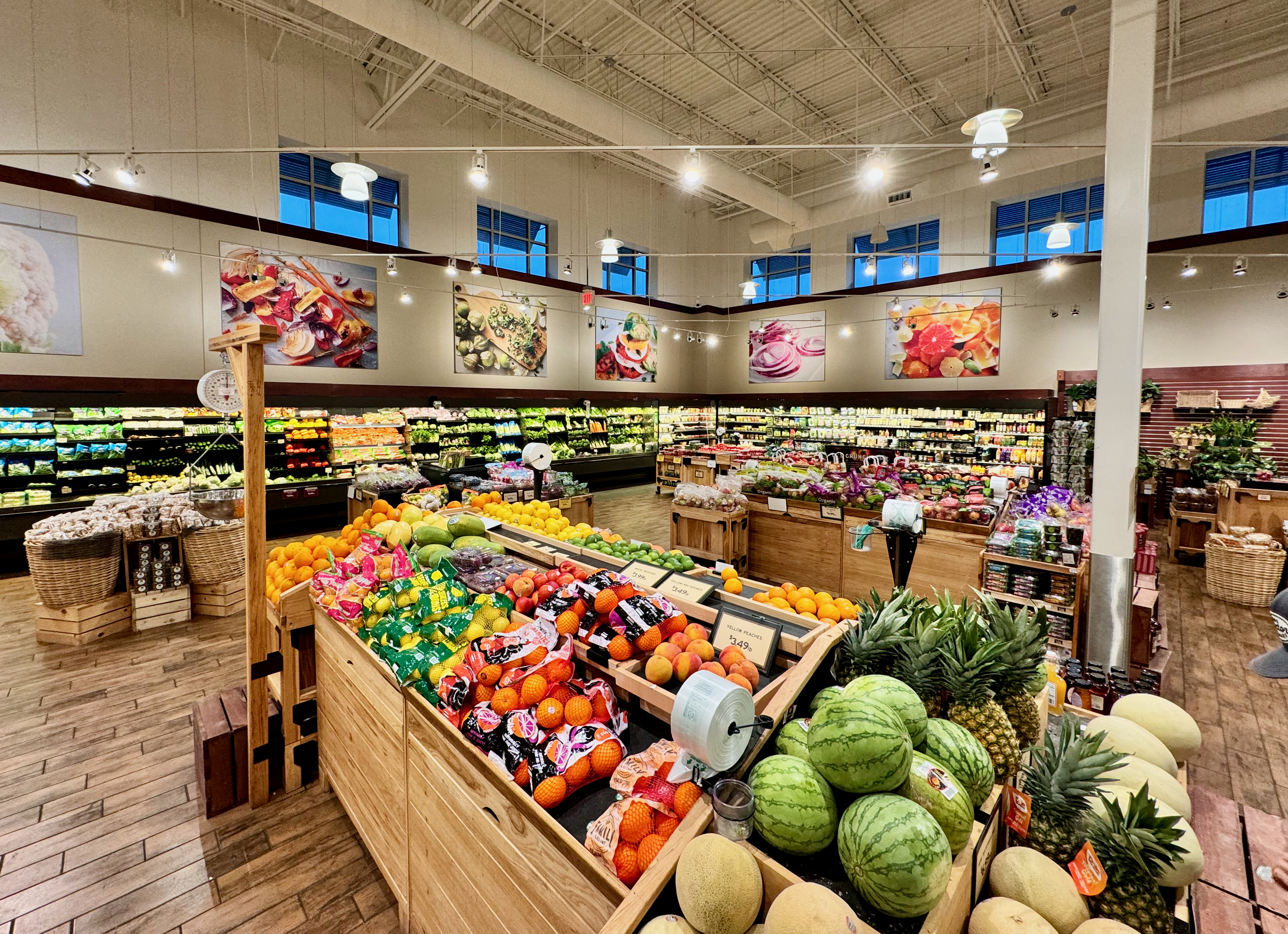
The interior of a Fresh Market store

The Fresh Market was founded by Ray and Beverly Berry on March 5, 1982, in Greensboro, North Carolina. The first store was opened in the former Bi-Rite store at the corner of Lawndale Dr. and Pisgah Church Rd. The Berrys' idea was to develop a better grocery store that brought back the feeling of open European-style markets. Their first store in the West opened in October 2012 in Roseville, California. However, in March 2014, the company announced that it was closing all three of its Sacramento area stores including its Roseville store.

In 2012, Fresh Market acquired and remodeled four locations of longtime family-owned Houston grocer Rice Epicurean Markets. These locations were subsequently closed in May 2016 when Fresh Market shuttered its 13 locations in Texas, Iowa, Missouri, and Kansas.

After increasing the price of its initial public offering from $18–20 to $22, Fresh Market raised $290 million, and on November 5, 2010, began trading on Nasdaq using the symbol TFM.

Apollo Global Management acquired the stock of The Fresh Market on April 27, 2016. The Fresh Market then became a privately held company and its stock was delisted on NASDAQ.

In March 2022, Fresh Market filed an updated prospectus for a new initial public offering, signaling the companies intent to return to becoming a public company.

In May 2022, the Chilean retail company Cencosud acquired a 67% stake in Fresh Market. On August 30, 2025, Cencosud announced that it had acquired the remaining 33% stake from Apollo, becoming the sole owner of the company.

== Trademark disputes ==
The Fresh Market has been in numerous trademark disputes relating to its commonplace name. In 2005, the company lost a trademark dispute with "Marsh Supermarkets" relating to the 'Fresh Market' trademark. The U.S. federal court in South Bend, Indiana stated “The Fresh Market trademark is descriptive and therefore weak and not entitled to broad sweeping protection." The Fresh Market was also in trademark disputes with “Fresh Market at Roth's" and in 2010 with a Utah-based company named "A Fresh Market". In the latter case, it was argued that the term "Fresh Market" was too generic to be trademarked.

In 2017 the company's name “The Fresh Market” was trademarked by the U.S. Patent and Trademark Office.

== Awards ==
From 2021 to 2023, the company was named the "Best Grocery Store in America" for three consecutive years by USA Today.
