= Islamic Society of Greater Houston =

System of mosques in Greater Houston

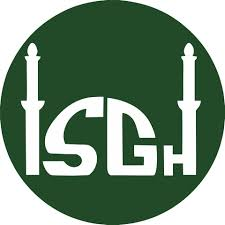
- Islamic Society of Greater Houston logo
- Abbreviation: ISGH
- Formation: 1969
- Type: non-profit 501(c)(3) religious organization
- Location: 21
- Region served: Houston, Texas
- President: Emran Gazi
- Website: isgh.org

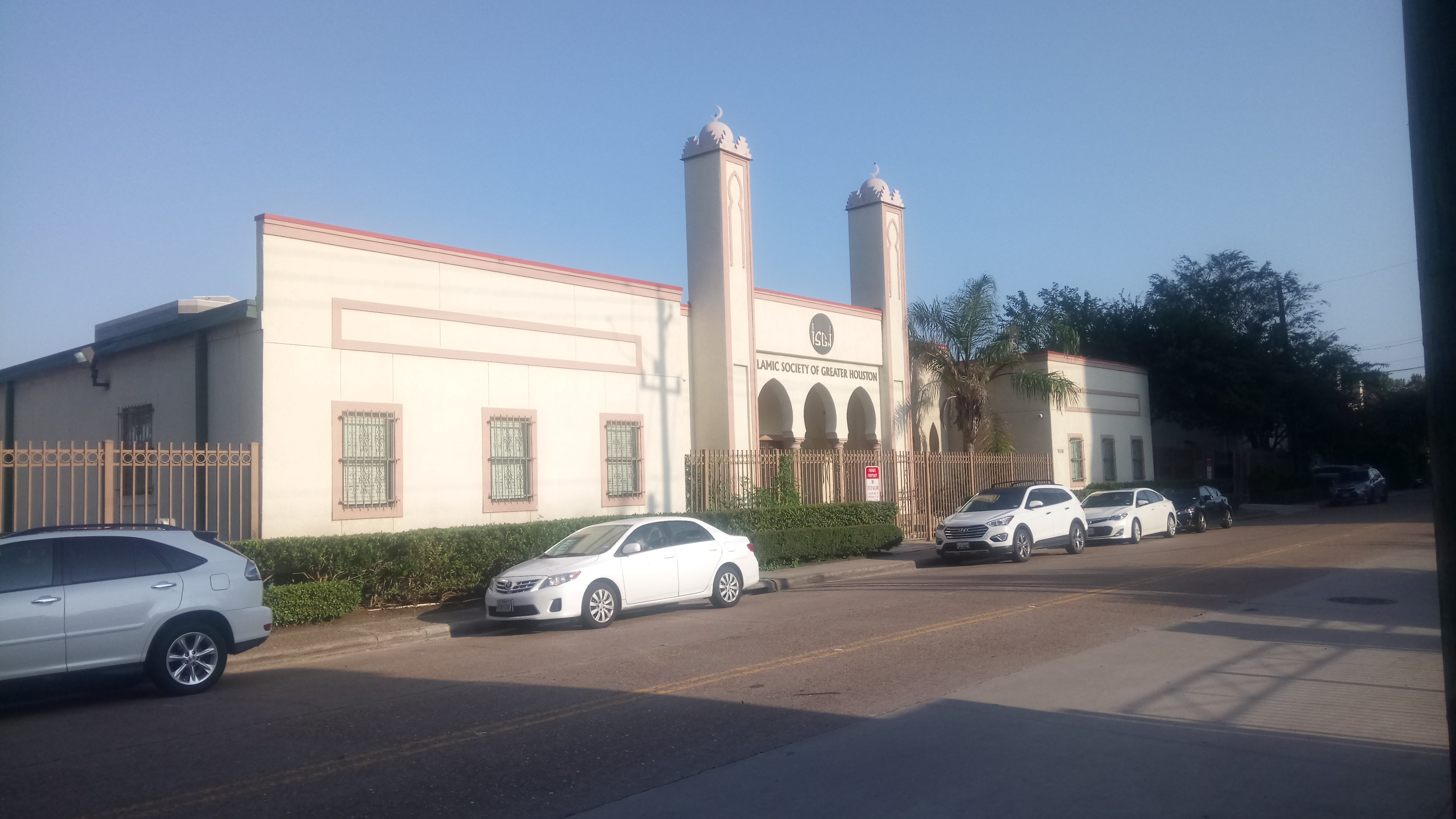
ISGH headquarters (Eastside Main Center)

The Islamic Society of Greater Houston (ISGH) is a system of mosques in Greater Houston. It is headquartered at the Eastside Main Center in Upper Kirby in Houston.

As of 1990 the ISGH served as the main Sunni mosque system in Houston, As of 2000, most Sunni mosques are a part of the ISGH. As of 2007 the ISGH included 17 mosques and had both Sunni and Shia members. As of that year, its president was Rodwan Saleh, a Sunni. In 2007 Saleh stated that he estimated that 15% of the members were Shia. As 1990, the Iranian Shia in Houston primarily used the ISGH mosques for occasional needs including marriages and funerals. As of that year, the ISGH had multiple branches in Houston. As of 2012, it is the largest Islamic community organization in Greater Houston. The current president of ISGH is Emran Gazi and the vice president is Javed Malik.

== History ==
In 1969 several families who used a house in the Texas Medical Center as their place of worship started the ISGH. Among those who helped found the organization was Mazhar Qazi, father of Islamic theologian Yasir Qadhi.

In the 1970s a three bedroom house in northern Houston was the only mosque in the city, and it served 30 families. Those families pooled funds and purchased a 1.5-acre (0.61 ha) plot of land in late 1980 so a mosque could be built there; the plot was near two major arteries. At first the mosque was in a 1,500-square-foot (140 m^{2}), three bedroom double-wide trailer, purchased for $43,000 ($168023.02 when accounting for inflation). Five families donated money to pay for the down payment, with each family paying $1,500 ($5861.27 when accounting for inflation). Public fundraising dinners and anonymous donations provided the funds for the construction of the permanent Al-Noor mosque.

Before the mid-1980s the religious leaders of mosques and the ISGH administration had separate roles: the leaders of mosques administered the teaching of Islam, the leading of prayers, and other religious matters while the board of directors of the ISGH focused on administrative affairs such as the construction of new mosques and financing; this resulted in parallel power structures. As new mosques came in, the ISGH believed that having huffaz with divergent points of view disrupted the unity in the community, and the organization saw new huffaz as threats to their own power. A hafiz could influence his members to vote and affect policies in the entire ISGH system. In the mid-1980s the ISGH leadership created the Ulama community to unify the leadership and consolidate its power.

The 1950s marked the first known organized Muslim community in Houston. That community met in the barber shop of Charlie Boyd. In 1978 they established the Houston Masjid of Al-Islam. This historic mosque was made possible by heavyweight champion Muhammad Ali, who donated the funds needed to purchase the Christian Scientist Church to convert as Houston's first mosque. Thirty-three years later, the mosque was rebuilt due to damage from Hurricane Ike. In 2011 the historic Houston mosque was renamed Masjid Warithudeen Mohammed in honor of one of America's pioneering Muslim leaders. This community has always focused on local activism and interfaith outreach, addressing issues of social justice and the uplifting of disfranchised people that continues to this day.

In 1969 a small group of immigrant Muslims, mostly students, some engineers and doctors established regular prayers and salat ul jummah (Friday congregational service) at a small house near the Medical Center. This led to the founding of ISGH, one of the most unusual Islamic organizations in America. Always growing, ISGH currently operates nineteen community centers, six full-time private schools, four community health clinics, three full-service funeral homes and burial ground, along with weekend Islamic schools, recreational facilities, and a hifz program, with over 150 students who have memorized the Qu'ran.

ISGH quickly gained success as a platform for all Houston Muslims because of its structure and bylaws. Although most of ISGH's constituents are Sunnis, its commitment to all the Muslims in Houston dates back to the first elected President, Dr. Ebrahim Yazdi, a Shi'a Muslim.

As Houston grows, so does its Muslim community. The first generation of ISGH leadership recognized the size of the greater Houston area and planned accordingly. ISGH operates through five primary "zones" across the area. These zones divide the distances among sections of town as follows: North, Northwest, South, Southeast and Southwest. Each zone, like the organization as a whole, has elected leadership who work to coordinate the activities and needs of the community in their areas.

In total the greater Houston area is home to about 100 Muslim and Islamic organizations, including many independent mosques and community-service focused nonprofits.

== Organizations and administration ==
As of 2000, ISGH has separate zones for each area of Houston, and mosques are all over Houston so that each Muslim in the city has a mosque nearby. Each zone has one main mosque, and some zones have more than one mosque. For instance the north zone had Al-Noor as its main mosque and it also had other mosques. As of 2000, lay people volunteering as imams serve smaller ISGH mosques, while huffaz serve larger ISGH mosques. In 2000 Badr wrote that "The role of the clergy in the organizational structure of the ISGH has been an area of contention in the Muslim community." Some members believe the priority of the clergy is to keep the Muslim community together, while others believe that each director of an ISGH zone should focus on the issues at his particular mosque. Badr wrote that Houston huffaz often have views in opposition to those in the main leadership, and she added that they originate from various countries "and rarely agree on any issue—big or small—facing the Muslim community."

The ISGH typically tries to build new mosques in community before other organizations do, so individual ethnic groups and factions do not build their own mosques.

== Ethnic relations ==
As of 2000, according to Badr, about 10% of ISGH consisted of Arabs. According to Badr, from 1990 to 2000 many Arabs began to create their own mosques and Islamic schools separate from the ISGH due to disagreements over various issues including the language of the Friday sermons, the operations of Sunday schools and full-time schools, and the monetary distribution and collection. In 2000 Badr wrote that Muslims "remain fragmented along ethnic lines" and this is mainly due to increased immigration.

There are women from south Asian backgrounds who do not believe in wearing the hijab, and the cultural differences result in different mosque attendance. As of 2000, on Friday evening sessions, 90% of the women attending the Main center are Arab, and 90% of the women attending the Friday night sessions at Al-Noor are Pakistani. The Northern zonal council has tried to remedy this by obtaining a group of members of various ethnic backgrounds.

== Religious doctrine ==
When determining when Ramadan begins, the ISGH uses the time when a crescent moon is first seen in North America as the start date of Ramadan. This originates from the Islamic Society of North America (ISNA).

== Mosques ==
=== Masjid Bilal ===
This mosque is also known as the Adel Road Mosque. The Al-Noor mosque is a red brick building. Hoda Badr, author of "Al Noor Mosque: Strength Through Unity, wrote that "there is nothing to indicate that it is a mosque" except for the windows that "bear a slight Arabic [sic] influence". The main prayer hall can house up to 1000 people; this area is reserved for men. As of 2000, every Friday about 1000 people attend the jumu'ah (juma) prayer. The second floor prayer hall, reserved for women, houses about 200–300 people. A balcony from the second floor extends over the first floor. The main mosque building also houses an auxiliary prayer area that may hold up to 200 people and a wudu area. The mosque property includes a community hall, located in a wooden frame house; and a recreation area which includes a pavilion used as a basketball court and an outdoor hall. Badr stated that of those who go to Al-Noor, most of them stated that it is the closest mosque to their house, so they attend on a regular basis, although they sometimes go to other mosques because they are closer to their employment centers, or to hear guest speakers, or to attend Jumu'ah.

As of 2000, about 60% of the worshipers at Masjid Bilal are Pakistani and Indian. The largest minorities are Bangladeshis, Arabs, and African-Americans. As of 2000, according to Badr, about 20% of Masjid Bilal consists of Arabs. Others include Anglos, Southeast Asians, Pacific Islanders, South Americans, and Europeans.

As of 2000, the sole Muslim funeral home in the State of Texas is located at Masjid Bilal, and it serves Muslims from all of Texas and from several nearby states. As of that year, about 90% of the Houston-area funeral prayers are conducted at Al-Noor due to the location of the funeral home.

The mosque includes a full-time private Islamic school. It also has educational classes for adults and children on Sundays and other days of the week. The Masjid Bilal offers a Sunday school that, as of 2000, has an enrollment of 238 children. As of that year it is the largest ISGH Sunday school in Houston. As of 2000, the enrollment was increasing and the student body was becoming more heavily South Asian and less ethnically diverse.

As part of its zakat services, the ISGH has special food stamps which can be used to pay bills and rent, bus fare, and items from Muslim grocery stores. Badr wrote that the services effectively help new immigrants but some women are hesitant to use the services because there are no women on the zakat committee and some women do not want to tell a man about their family problems.

In the 1999 Eid al-Fitr 2,200 people attended Eid at Masjid Bilal because the Muslims were unable to reserve a convention center for their Eid celebration, and therefore they had to celebrate their holiday at their neighborhood mosques.

As of 2000, 90% of the women attending the Friday night sessions at Masjid Bilal are Pakistani.

=== Other ===
Masjid al-Ansaar (Woodlands Islamic Center) was created in 2009, and in 2019 it had 300 parishioners. It is in an unincorporated area outside of The Woodlands census-designated place (CDP).

The 5,900-square-foot (550 m^{2}) Pearland Islamic Center, about 1 mile (1.6 km) north of Farm to Market Road 518, in Pearland, began construction December 2010 with an anticipated completion time of May 2011. It opened circa 2012. By 2016 the leadership was considering expanding the mosque, with June 2016 being the scheduled month of the start of construction. The mosque is on a 12-acre (4.9 ha) site.

Masjid Al-Mustafa, also known as The Bear Creek Islamic Center, opened in Houston to serve the Bear Creek, Copperfield, and greater Cypress communities of Houston in 1970.

== Schools ==
The Darul Arqam Islamic School District (DAISD), also known as Darul Arqam Schools, is the system of Islamic day schools operated by the ISGH. The Islamic Education Institute of Texas (IEIT) oversees the operations of the Islamic schools.

== Members ==
- M.J. Khan, who once served in the Houston City Council, was a member of the ISGH board

== See also ==
- List of mosques in the Americas
- Lists of mosques
- List of mosques in the United States
- Islam in Houston
- History of the Pakistani-Americans in Houston
