= Rice Epicurean Markets =

Grocery store chain based in Houston, Texas

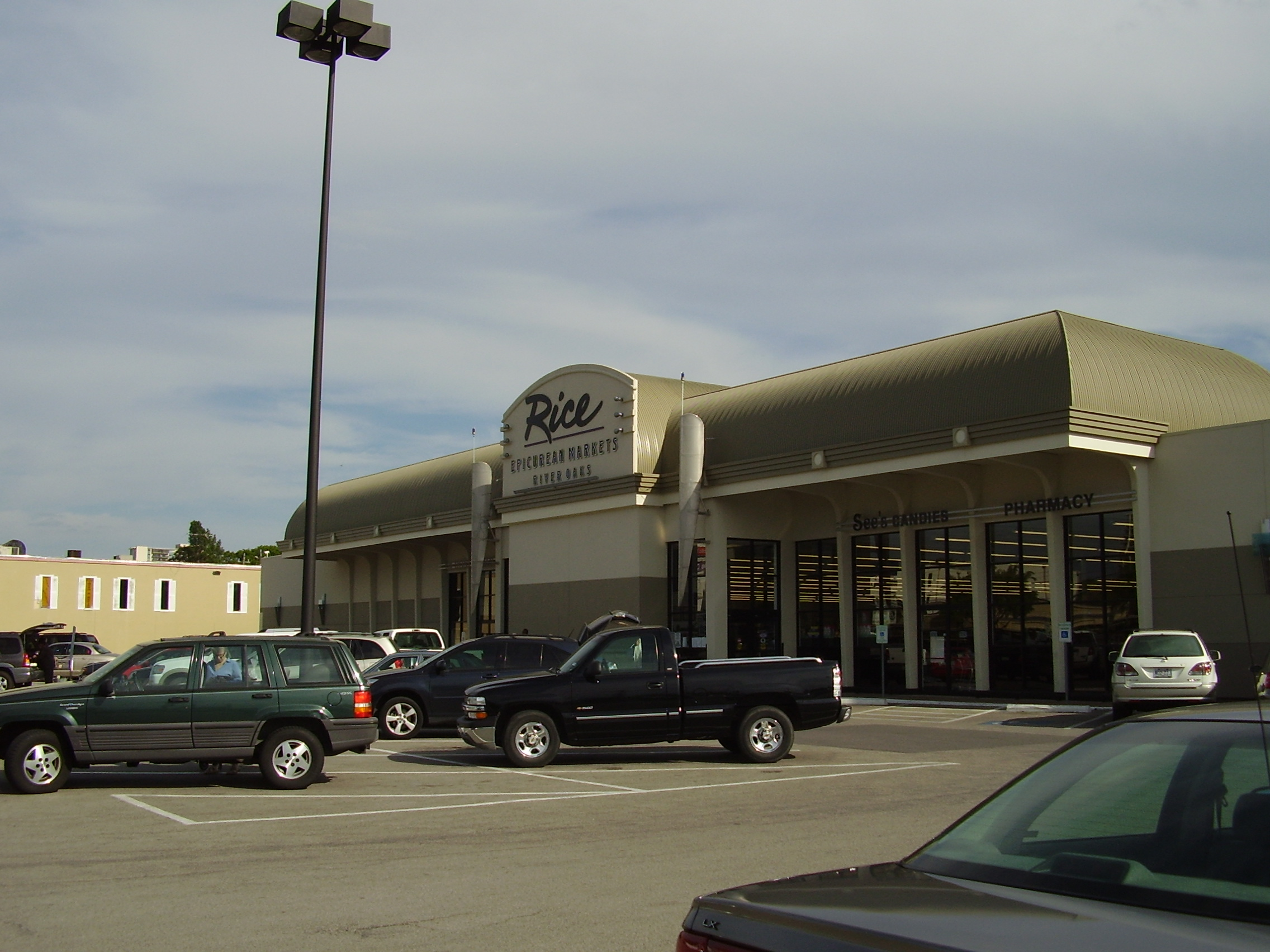
Rice Epicurean Markets Weslayan - 206, west of River Oaks (closed, currently a Walgreens)

Rice Epicurean Markets was an American niche grocery store chain based in Southwest Houston, Houston, Texas. As of July 2022, all locations are closed. Prior to 2012 the company operated five Rice Epicurean Markets, which ranged in size from 25,000 to 42,000 square feet (3,900 m^{2}). At its height, it operated 35 stores. The last Rice Epicurean Market was wholly owned by founding family members.

== History ==
=== Rice Boulevard Food Market ===
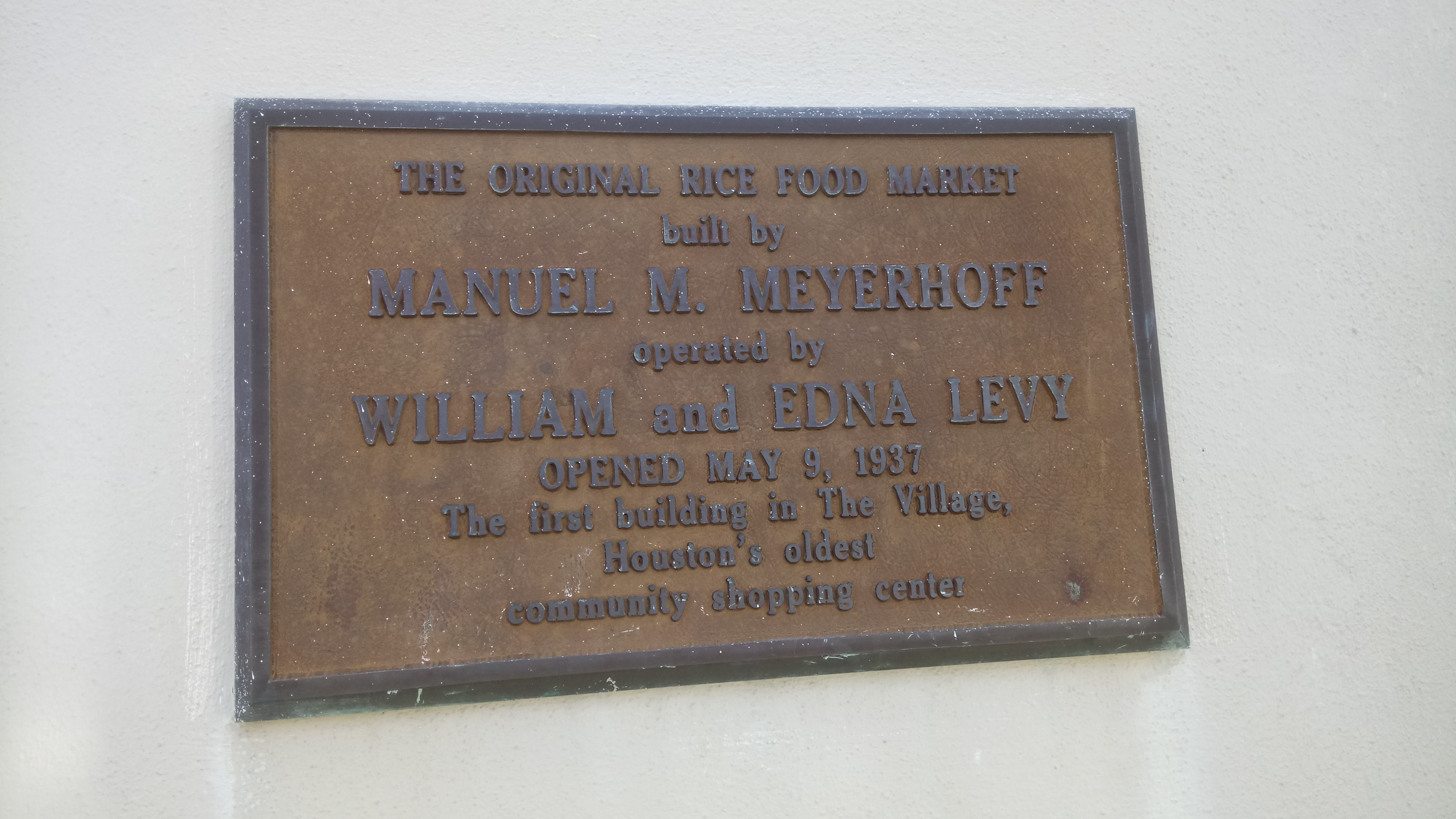
Plaque at Rice Village marking the site of the first Rice Food Market

Founded on May 5, 1937, by William H. Levy, grandfather of the current owners, the first Rice Food Market store, a 2,400-square-foot (220 m^{2}) building located on Rice Boulevard in Houston, was named Rice Boulevard Food Market. The store was located in Rice Village.

In 1937, The Village shopping center west of Rice Institute (now Rice University) was an undeveloped, wooded area. Rice Boulevard was an unpaved dirt road and West University Place was in its developmental stages. In those early days, there were only two buildings in the shopping center, an ice house at the corner of Rice Boulevard and Kirby, and William H. Levy's Rice Boulevard Food Market.

The first store was only 40 feet (12 m) by 60 feet (18 m), and included William Levy's wife Edna among the personnel, which numbered only five. That successful first store was eventually enlarged on five occasions until there was no longer space on the site for expansion.

In 1955, William Levy's son-in-law, Alfred L. Friedlander, now co-chairman emeritus, joined the business. Two years later, his son, Joel M. Levy, now also co-chairman emeritus, came into the family business.

Gary Friedlander, Alfred's son, is now the president and COO of the company.

=== Rice Food Markets ===
In April 1957 the family opened its second location in Tanglewood. The store served area farmers who had previously traveled to the Rice Village location. The Tanglewood store necessitated a change in the firm's name from Rice Boulevard Food Market to Rice Food Markets.

When the Tanglewood store opened, it was surrounded by farmland. The store virtually stood alone and was the only major structure in what was to become the Uptown District of Houston.

In 1960, Rice Epicurean moved its headquarters to a plot of land in Southwest Houston. During the same year, the three existing Rice Food Markets merged with another family grocery, Jack's, also with three locations. The grocer also moved its first store on Rice Boulevard to a new location across the street. The 17,000-square-foot (1,600 m^{2}) store was eventually closed in 2003.

The company opened more Rice stores and acquired independents, amassing more than 35 stores.

The company went public in 1968. In 1975 Rice became a privately owned company again. Friedlander said this was because "the public market for small companies dried up." In the mid-1970s Rice had up to 45 stores. In a ten-year period between 1973 and 1983 the chain closed and sold several older stores and did not expand. Judith Crown of the Houston Chronicle said "wasn't seen as an aggressive competitor at a time when other supermarkets capitalized on Houston's growth and added new stores during the boom years of the 1970s and early 1980s." Friedlander said, as paraphrased by Crown, "conceded that Rice was in a prolonged period of retrenchment." A grocery store competitor quoted in Crown's 1985 article said "They just sat there for years. Employees can't stay motivated when you do nothing."

The owners of Rice, from time to time, had considered selling the company. They had seriously considered accepting an offer to sell the company made several years before 1985. The family decided to not sell the company. Instead the owners intended to pass the business to the next generation of family members and to reinvest in the company.

In 1980 Rice had six percent of the Houston area grocery marketshare. In the 1980s, Rice converted some its of conventional Rice Food Markets to discount grocery stores, including Pricebuster and Grocery World. At its peak, Rice would operate 55 stores.

In 1984 two partners in the Rice company had sold their stakes. During that year, Rice took possession of five Weingarten's stores, causing the chain to again begin expansion. In 1985 the owners of Rice Food Markets were Friedlander, Joel Levy, and Ralph Cohen. Cohen was a member of a family that had, on a previous occasion, merged its business into Rice Food Markets. In 1985 Rice purchased 22 Eagle supermarkets; they were formerly owned by Lucky Stores, the parent company of Eagle; Lucky had sold or closed the 22 Eagle stores the month before Rice acquired them. Each Eagle store was about 30,000-square-foot (2,800 m^{2}), similar to Rice's existing stores. Friedlander said this made the Eagle stores attractive to Rice.

In 1994 Rice acquired three locations from AppleTree Markets.

In 2005 Rice opened its newest headquarters facility in the Southwest Houston plot.

On November 14, 2012, Rice announced the planned closure of four of its five remaining stores. The stores reopened in 2013 as Fresh Market.

=== Rice Epicurean Markets ===
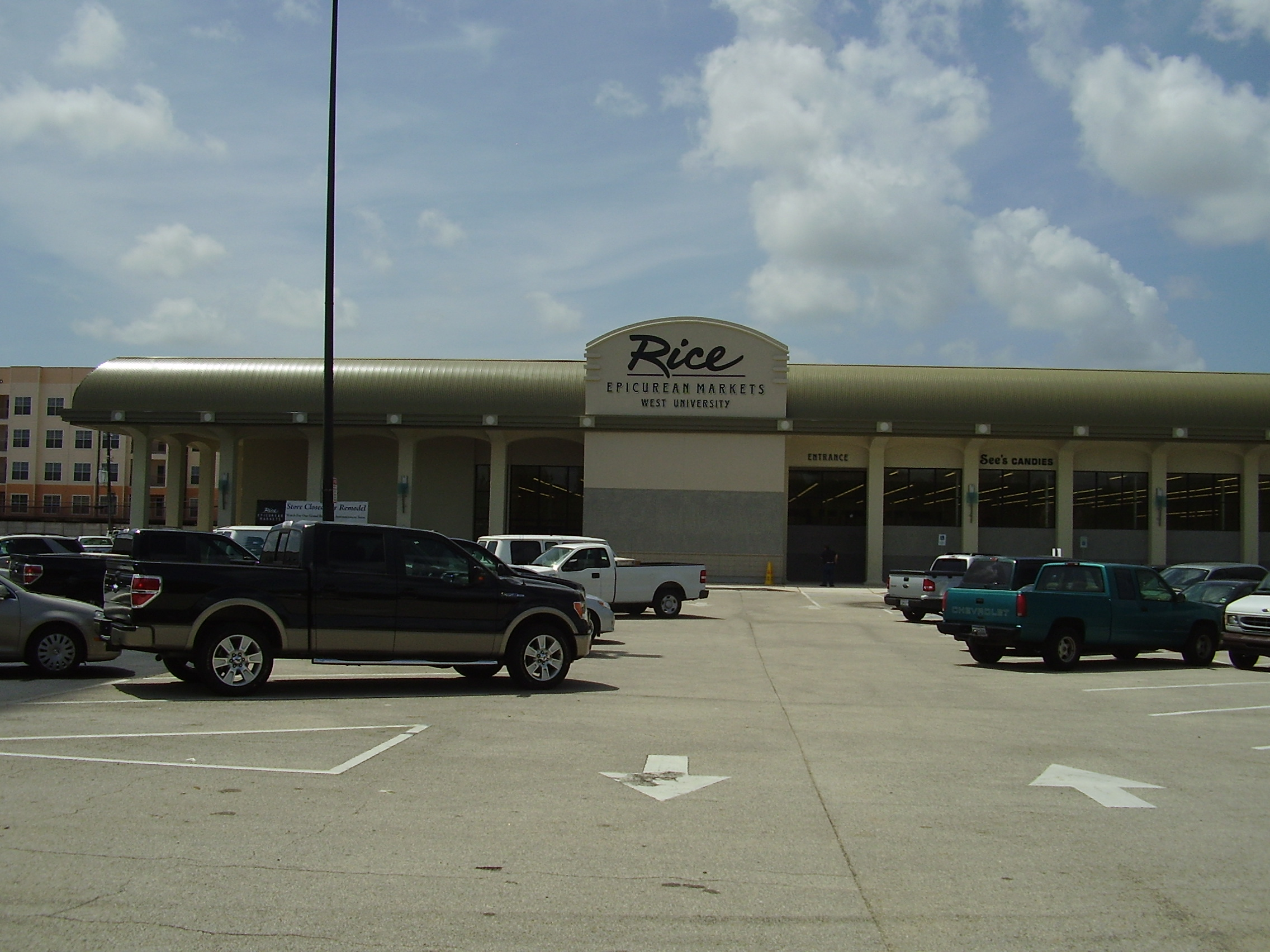
Rice Epicurean Markets West University, in Houston, near West University Place (now closed)

The Tanglewood store was remodeled in 1988 and became the first to assume the name Rice Epicurean Market. At that time Rice Epicurean was a division of Rice Food Markets. But the company would soon assume the Rice Epicurean Markets name. In 1999, Rice Food Markets changed its name to its current moniker after it sold or closed four Grocery World, six Pricebuster and three Rice Food Markets stores after deciding to focus on its upscale niche instead of market size. After the divestiture, eight stores remain, with a ninth under construction.

The Rice Epicurean concept paid close attention to the regular stock of grocery store items, but special requests, gourmet products and customer service figured prominently in the overall operation. The perishable departments received special attention, featuring the finest meat, produce, chef prepared salads and entrees, upscale floral departments and European bakery departments.

The charge card system with monthly billing, was introduced in 1964. In 2002, Rice Epicurean became the only Houston grocer to offer online shopping.

Most Rice shoppers were wealthier and older, and preferred home grocery delivery service. Katharine Shilcutt of the Houston Press said "A long-running joke with many Houstonians is that no one quite knew how [the company] stayed in business because" even though the stores had a long history in Houston, they "were almost always quiet, with few cars in the parking lot or shoppers in the aisles." She added that "all kinds of wild rumors flew about how Rice Epicurean stores stayed open despite a lack of traffic" had circulated.

In November 2012 Rice announced that it would close all locations except the Fountain View one, and rent out the closed locations to The Fresh Market. The Rice stores would close in early 2013 and The Fresh Market locations would open in the northern hemisphere summer or fall of 2013. Shilcutt said that the former business model "sustained Rice Epicurean for many years" but "it appears that this model wasn't quite enough to keep its stores in business." The first The Fresh Market opened in the former West University location in the city of Houston on July 17, 2013. Additional stores scheduled to open are the Memorial Drive store on July 24, the Westheimer Road store on August 7, and the store on San Felipe on August 21.

== Headquarters ==
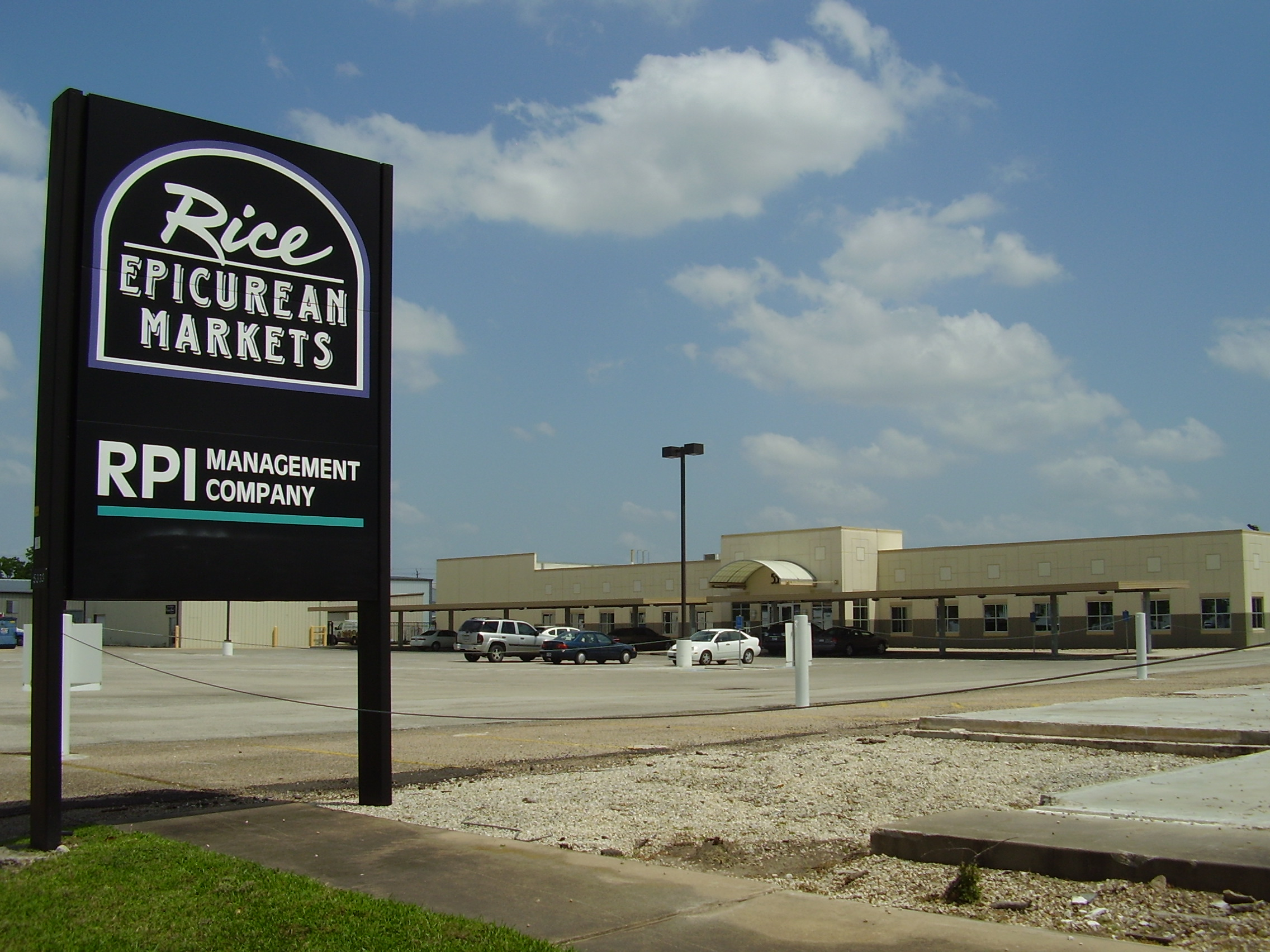
Headquarters of Rice Epicurean Markets in Southwest Houston

The corporate office for Rice Epicurean Markets was located on a lot in Southwest Houston. Rice established its headquarters there in 1960, and the 16,000-square-foot (1,500 m^{2}) headquarters facilities opened on that land in 2005.

== Store characteristics ==
In 1985 Rice stores had sizes ranging from 12,000 square feet (1,100 m^{2}) to 30,000 square feet (2,800 m^{2}). They tended to be older and smaller than newer grocery stores, which ranged around 50,000 square feet (4,600 m^{2}) to 60,000 square feet (5,600 m^{2}). In 1985 industry executives said that Rice customers usually made more frequent and smaller purchases.

Each Rice store carried a set of merchandise that varied depending on the ethnic background of the neighborhood that it resided in. A grocer quoted in a 1985 Houston Chronicle article said that Rice shoppers tended to be older than shoppers at other chains, and Rice shoppers tended to be very loyal to the chain. In 1985 Judith Crown of the Houston Chronicle said that Rice "probably" has "more specialty goods than other chains."

In 1985 Alfred L. Friedlander, president of Rice Food Markets, said that because the stores were older and difficult to maintain, and because stores in lower income neighborhoods had frequent traffic, making it more difficult to keep the stores well stocked and clean, the stores received criticism for a lack of cleanliness.

Crown said in 1985 that "The average supermarket size has been growing based on the belief that larger stores are more efficient. This way, operators can spread their overhead costs over greater volumes. Many grocers assume that smaller volumes require higher prices." In 1985 Friedlander said that because it takes less time to shop at a smaller store, smaller stores may be more convenient for customers than larger stores. He also said that smaller stores are less expensive to operate than larger stores, when measuring in total dollars spent, and that a store does not have to have high volume to be profitable.

== Notable achievements ==
In 1996, Rice Epicurean Markets was awarded the Nationally Acclaimed Award of Excellence honor by Supermarket Business. For many years, Rice Epicurean has also been recognized by the Houston Business Journal as a Top 50 Owned Family Owned Business in Houston.

In 1976, an alternative form of the “this little piggy” song was created by Anne Williamson to include Rice as the second little piggy. This version was popularized throughout the Alief area.
