= Ghulam Bombaywala =

Pakistani-American restaurateur

Ghulam Mohammed "Bombay" Bombaywala is a Pakistani-American restaurateur in Houston. In 1999, Magaret L. Briggs of the Houston Press wrote that Bombaywala was "well-known" and "perhaps most famous for sharing his rags-to-riches tale with Oprah's audience". In 2006 Edward Hegstrom of the Houston Chronicle wrote "Bombaywala's rise to success is practically legend in Houston."

== Early life ==
Bombaywala was born and raised in Karachi. He is a Halai Memon, and his family migrated to Pakistan from India during the Partition of 1947. His mother's name is Zeenat after whom he later named the Zeenat Foundation.

He attended primary and secondary school in Karachi, first going to the Unique English School, then Church Mission School (CMS), then the Government National College, where he got an intermediate school diploma or an "Inter".

== Career ==
=== 1970s and 1980s ===
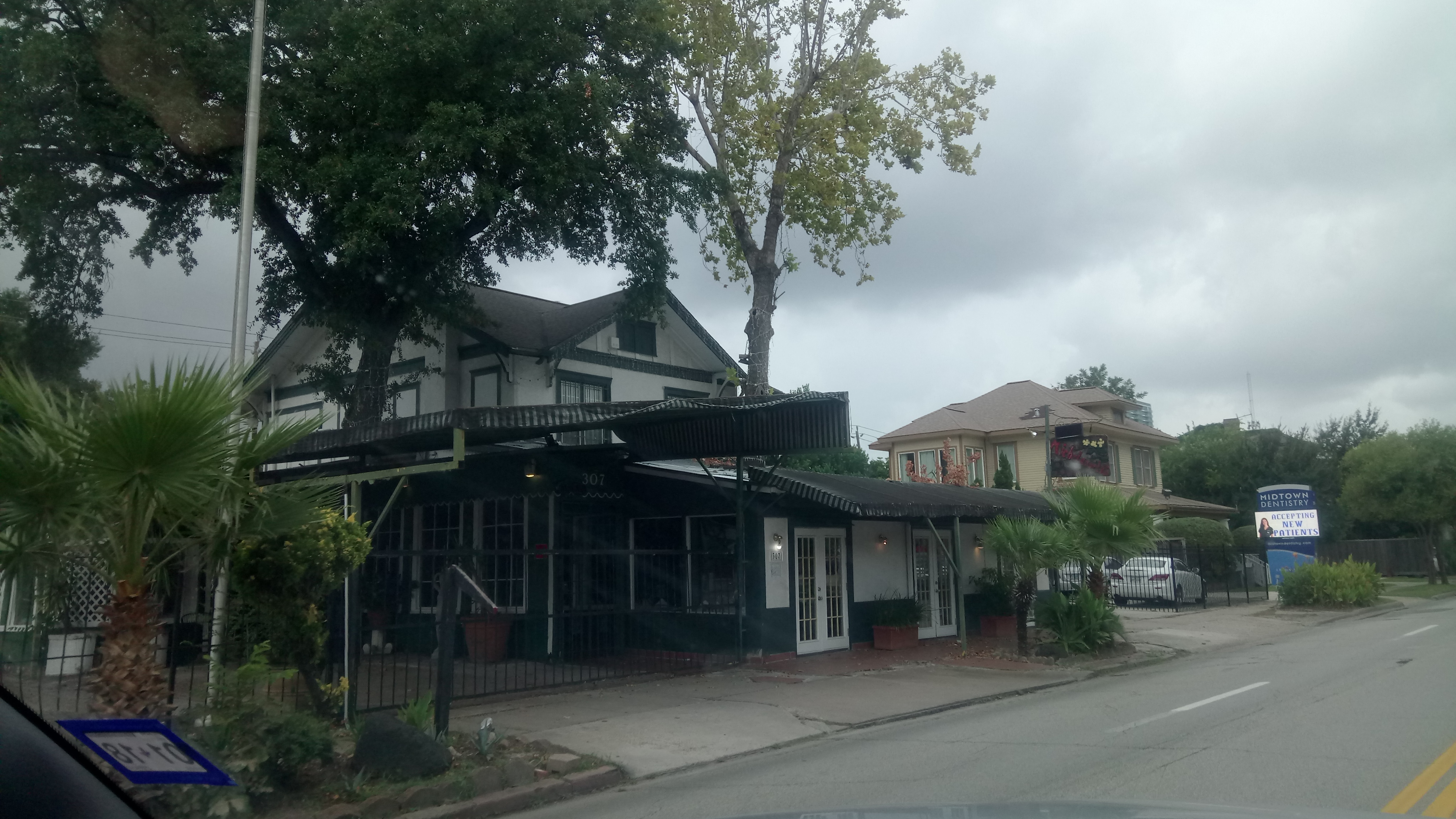
Michelangelo's, which Bombaywala acquired

At age 17, in 1973 he arrived in Houston on a student visa. On arrival, he had fewer than $50 ($362.63 according to inflation) in cash. That year he began studying at South Texas Junior College. After arriving, he began working as a busboy. At first he had started a chain of convenience stores after saving enough funds to do so. He ultimately earned an associate degree from the University of Houston–Downtown College. Bombaywala was part-owner of ten convenience stores and four liquor stores in 1982.

With his saved funds, he bought an Italian restaurant in Montrose, Michelangelo's. At one time Michelangelo's had refused to employ Bombaywala for a busboy position due to his low English fluency. He had also established a restaurant chain, Marco's.

In the late 1980s, Bombaywala traveled to New York City for five days to do research on delicatessens. Each day, he ate at three different delicatessens. After he returned to Houston, he took recipes from one of the partners who agreed to work with him, Doris Katz. In 1989 he, Katz, and Irvin Kaplan, opened Guggenheim's Delicatessen, a New York-style deli located at the intersection of San Felipe and Post Oak Boulevard.

=== 1990s ===
In 1990, Bombaywala, Kaplan, Donald Bonham, Edwin Freedman, and Max Levit and Milton Levit acquired James Coney Island out of bankruptcy court.

Ernst and Young called Bombaywala the retail entrepreneur of Houston of the year in 1991.

He acquired Two Pesos Inc., which was making annual losses of $2.7 million, and became the company's chairperson and president. In 1993 he sold Two Pesos, by then profitable, for $30 million to Taco Cabana. Two Pesos had 27 locations as of 1999. Because of this and other turn-arounds of restaurants, Bombaywala became known as the "restaurant doctor".

In 1992, he acquired one million shares, or 5%, of the convenience store chain National Convenience Stores, which is the parent of Stop N Go.

In 1994, Bombaywala expressed his intention to open Marco's Mexican Restaurant locations across the United States.

In July 1994 Bombaywala merged Marco's Mexican Restaurants and Billy Blues Food Co., a San Antonio, Texas, chain. This meant he received the vice chairperson position and a 54% ownership of the combined company. At the time of the merger, the Billy Blues restaurants were making losses and had a large debt. In September the board of the merged company elected Bombaywala as the chairperson. At the time there were 12 Billy Blues restaurants, including one in Houston. Billy Blues also owned 20 Marcos Mexican Restaurants in Houston and those were acquired too. Bombaywala planned to move the Billy Blues headquarters from San Antonio to Houston.

By 1998 he had established a holding company for some of his restaurants, Watermarc Food Management Co., and he served as its chairperson. It was the holding company of Billy Blues Barbecue Bar & Grill, Marco's Mexican Restaurant, and The Original Pasta Co. In regards to Billy Blues, Bombaywala was unable to turn around that restaurant nor was he able to placate the company's creditors. In January 1999 Watermarc filed for Chapter 11 bankruptcy. By September 1999 five Billy Blue's restaurants closed.

By 1999, Bombaywala appeared on the Oprah Winfrey show, and the episode discussed the rise of his business empire.

On Monday August 30, 1999 a U.S. bankruptcy court approved of the bankruptcy settlement. According to the settlement, the assets, including 29 restaurants, were to be sold to Five Points Investments Inc., a company owned by Haroon Sheikh, for $13 million. The restaurants were to continue to be operated under their current names. Watermarc was scheduled to be dissolved. Shaikh became the sole owner and CEO of Five Points, while Bombaywala became the overseer of daily management at Five Points. At the time the restaurants had a combined total of 1,200 employees.

=== 2000s ===
In December 2000, Bombaywala closed Guggenheim's. The remaining Billy Blues Bar & Grill location on Richmond Avenue in Houston closed in January 2001.

At its peak, Five Points, later named Five Star Restaurants, Inc., and headquartered in Sugar Land, Texas, had over 40 restaurants.

In September 2003 Five Points, now named Five Star, filed for Chapter 11 bankruptcy. On the day of the bankruptcy filing, Bombaywala resigned as the president of the company. By January 2004, the remaining restaurants of Five Star were scheduled to be auctioned off, and the company, which had 300 employees at the time, was scheduled to close.

In 2006 Bombaywala himself filed for Chapter 7 bankruptcy. By 2006 Bombaywala's son officially owned Michelangelo's.

== Foundation work ==
After the September 11, 2001, attacks, Bombaywala became the head of the Pakistani-American Association of Greater Houston (PAGH). He began advocating for more humane treatment of people of Pakistani descent.

In the mid-2000s Bombaywala had a conflict with Houston City Council member M.J. Khan. After the 2005 Kashmir earthquake, the two men organized separate relief efforts instead of doing a joint effort.

Bombaywala had served on the boards of the Asia Society of Texas, the United Way Gulf Coast Chapter, the Houston Food Bank, and the Sam Houston Area Boy Scouts of America.

== Personal life ==
Bombaywala married twice. In 1978, he married a half-Spanish, half-Irish woman. He was married to her for six years and had three children with her. In 1987 he remarried, and as of 2007 he remains married to his second wife.

As of 2004 Bombaywala was a Republican. He planned to vote for George W. Bush as president of the United States in the 2004 presidential election.

== See also ==
- History of the Pakistani-Americans in Houston
- Ninfa Laurenzo
- Percy Creuzot
