= Southwest Houston =

Area of Houston, Texas, United States

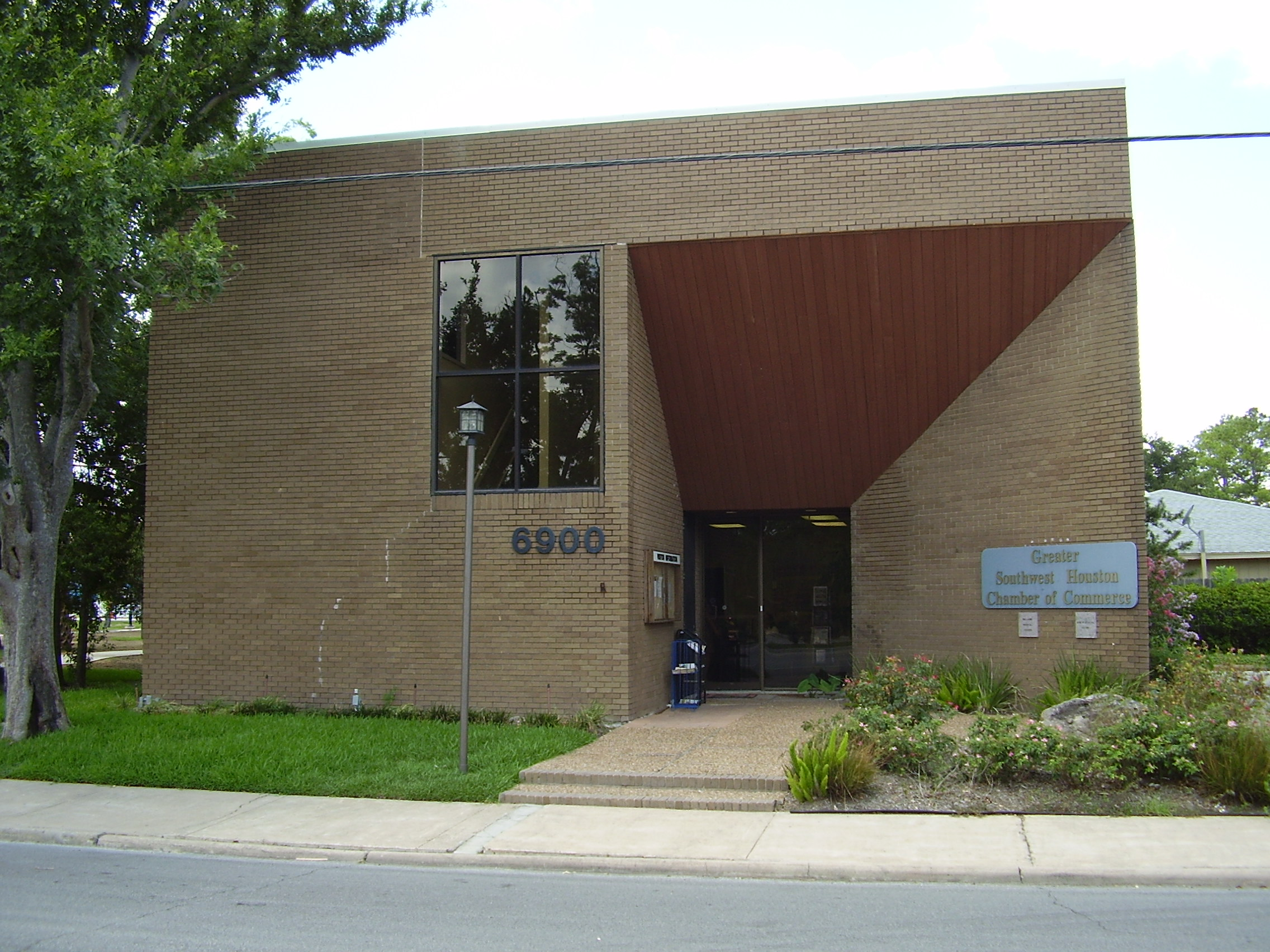
The Greater Southwest Houston Chamber of Commerce building in the City of Bellaire (the office has since moved)

Southwest Houston is a region in Houston, Texas, United States. The area is considered to be from Texas State Highway 6, south of Westpark Tollway to north of U.S. Route 90.

Many Section 8 (housing) complexes are located in Southwest Houston. Hurricane Katrina refugees came to the area in 2005.

The Houston Metropolitan Chamber, formerly the Greater Southwest Houston Chamber of Commerce, serves several neighborhoods often identified as "Southwest Houston."

== History ==
From the 1980 U.S. Census to the 1990 Census, many African-Americans left traditional African-American neighborhoods and entered parts of Southwest Houston; areas of Southwest Houston received from more than 1,000 African-Americans per square mile to more than 3,500 African-Americans per square mile. Many African Americans in the U.S are also moving to Southwest Houston in the New Great Migration. Many Asian-Americans moved into Southwest Houston during the same period. They were mostly Chinese American, Indian American, and Pakistani American; some pockets of Cambodian Americans, Filipino Americans, Korean Americans, and Vietnamese Americans appeared during that period. Southwest Houston area contains one of the most diverse neighborhoods in the Southern United States.

On May 31, 2013, the Houston Fire Department suffered its largest casualty in a single event, the Southwest Inn fire, with four firefighters killed and 13 others were injured while fighting a 5-alarm fire at Southwest Inn, located in the Greater Sharpstown district of Southwest Houston.

== Neighborhoods and communities considered to be in Southwest Houston ==
Neighborhoods and communities in Houston defined as Southwest Houston by the Greater Southwest Houston Chamber of Commerce:

- Braeswood/Stella Link
- Central Southwest
- Fondren Southwest
- Greenway Plaza
- Gulfton
- Meyerland/South Post Oak
- Reliant Park/South Loop
- Rice Village/Texas Medical Center
- Sharpstown
- Uptown

Cities defined by the Greater Southwest Houston Chamber of Commerce as in "Southwest Houston":

- Bellaire
- Southside Place
- West University Place

Other neighborhoods and communities in Houston considered to be in Southwest Houston:

- Alief
- Westheimer, Houston
- South Main, Houston
- Energy Corridor

Other neighborhoods and communities outside of Houston considered to be in Southwest Houston

- Brazoria County:
  - Lakes of Savannah : The website refers to the community as in "Southwest Houston"

== Economy ==
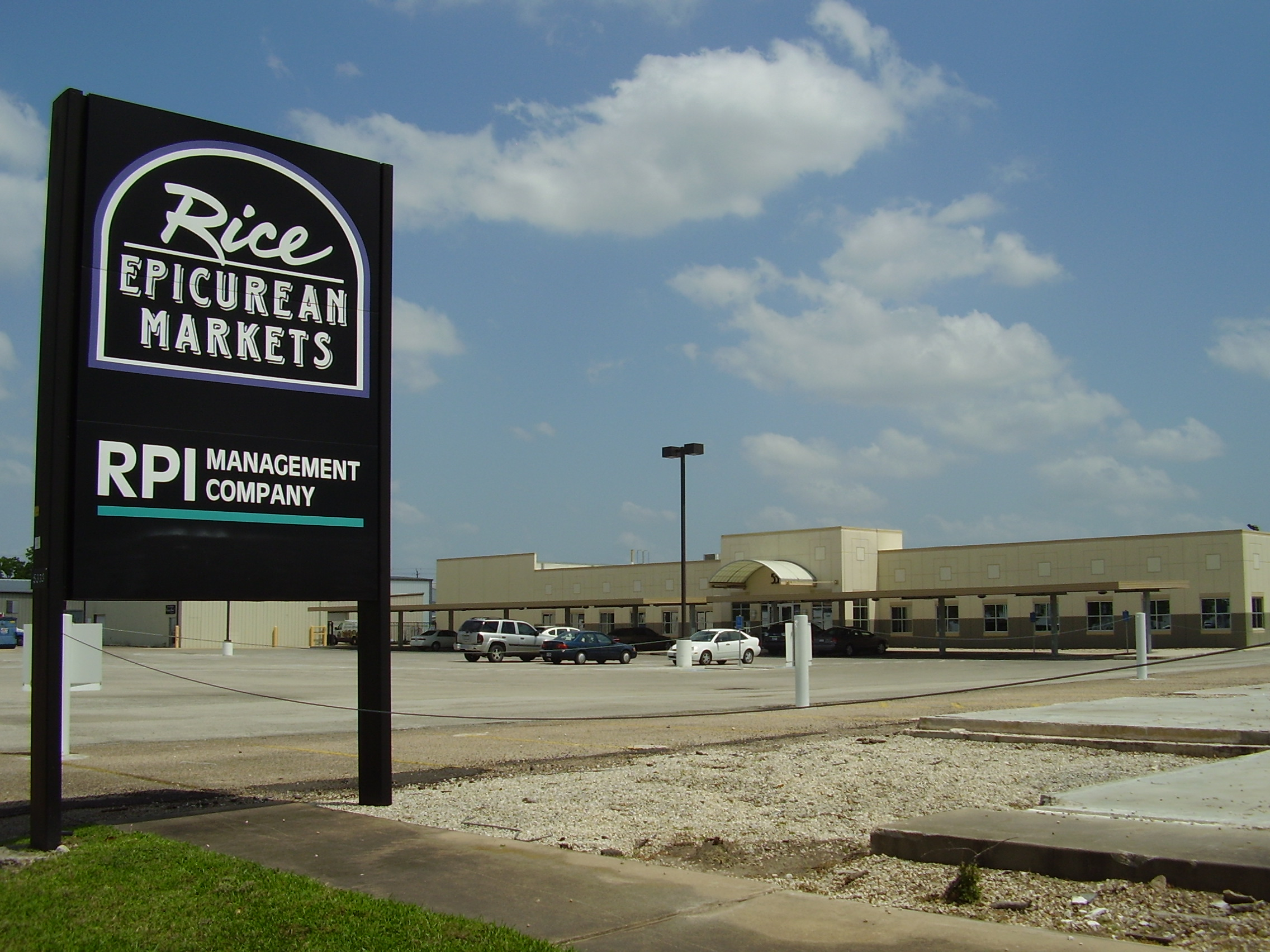
Headquarters of Rice Epicurean Markets

The corporate office for Rice Epicurean Markets is located on a lot in Southwest Houston. Rice established its headquarters there in 1960, and the current 16,000 square feet (1,500 m^{2}) headquarters facilities opened on that land in 2005. Walmart and other smaller grocery stores were observed including gas stations. Many Non industrial business ventures were observed with few industrial and factory businesses. The small business owners consist of average size employees. Most people work in the community.

== Education ==
Some areas in Southwest Houston are within the Houston Independent School District. Some areas are in the Alief Independent School District. The Imani School is in Southwest Houston.

== Notable residents ==
- M.J. Khan (former Houston City Council member)
- Maxo Kream (American hip hop artist)
